= Staind discography =

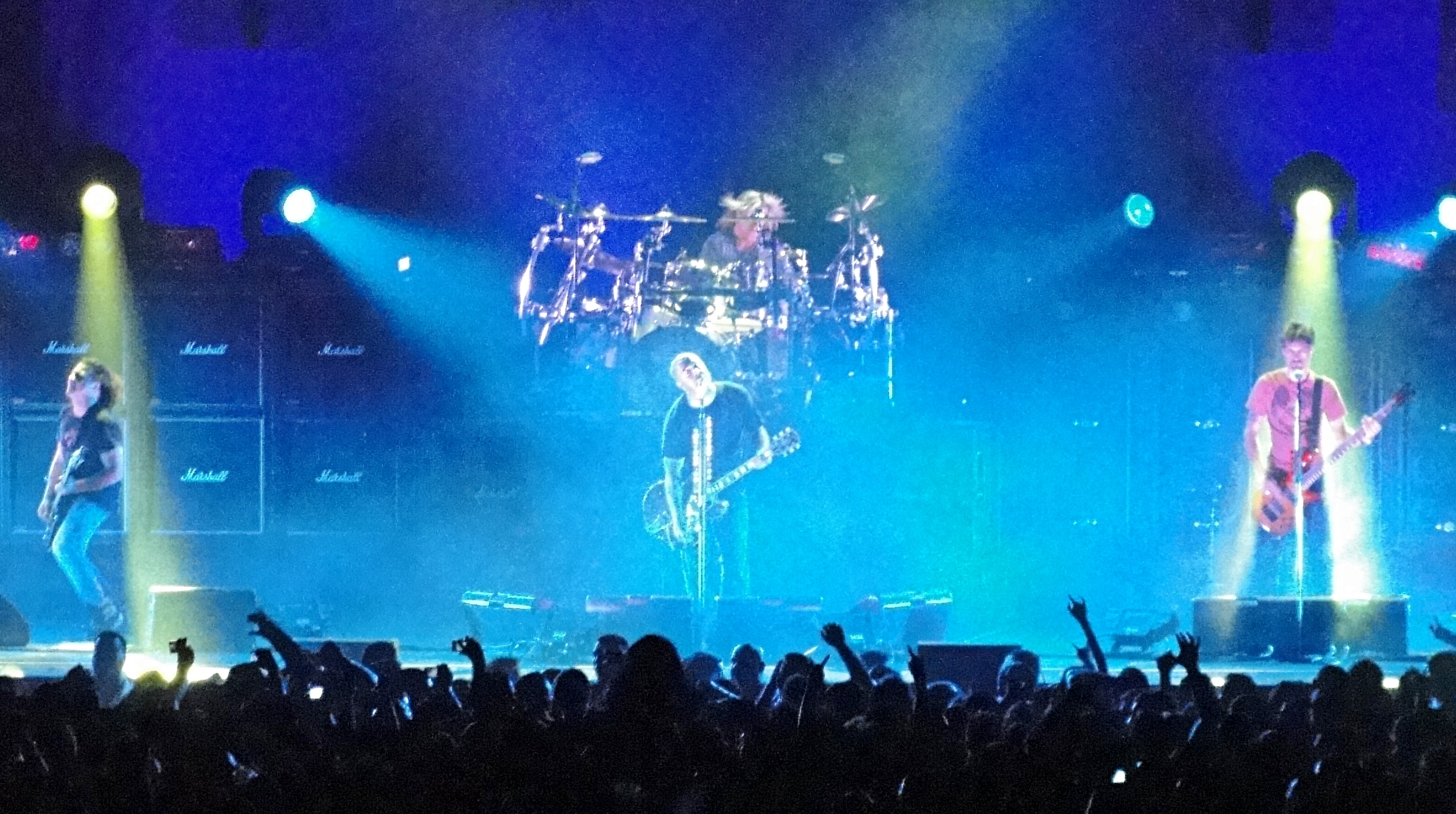
- Staind performing in 2009
- Studio albums: 8
- Live albums: 3
- Compilation albums: 1
- Singles: 26
- Video albums: 2
- Music videos: 18

American rock band Staind has released eight studio albums, three live albums, one compilation album, two video albums, 26 singles, and 18 music videos. Their best-selling album is Break the Cycle, released in May 2001, which sold around 6.4 million copies worldwide.

== Albums ==
=== Studio albums ===
List of studio albums, with selected chart positions and certifications
Title	Album details	Peak chart positions										Certifications
Title	Album details	US	AUS	AUT	GER	JPN	NLD	NZ	SWE	SWI	UK	Certifications
Tormented	Released: November 29, 1996; Label: Self-released; Formats: CD, CS	—	—	—	—	—	—	—	—	—	—	
Dysfunction	Released: April 13, 1999; Label: Elektra; Formats: CD, CS, digital download	74	—	—	—	—	—	—	—	—	—	RIAA: 2× Platinum
Break the Cycle	Released: May 8, 2001; Label: Elektra; Formats: CD, CS, digital download	1	18	6	5	60	36	1	9	18	1	RIAA: 7× Platinum; ARIA: Gold; BPI: Platinum; BVMI: Gold; MC: 2× Platinum; RMNZ: 2× Platinum
14 Shades of Grey	Released: May 20, 2003; Label: Elektra; Formats: CD, CS, digital download, DVD-A	1	35	32	17	122	78	26	30	16	16	RIAA: Platinum; MC: Gold
Chapter V	Released: August 9, 2005; Label: Atlantic; Formats: CD, CS, digital download	1	79	43	37	97	—	14	51	24	112	RIAA: Platinum
The Illusion of Progress	Released: August 19, 2008; Label: Atlantic; Formats: CD, LP, digital download	3	100	67	41	186	90	22	—	40	73	
Staind	Released: September 13, 2011; Label: Atlantic; Formats: CD, LP, digital download	5	100	47	25	—	—	—	—	32	85	
Confessions of the Fallen	Released: September 22, 2023; Label: Alchemy, BMG; Format: CD, LP, digital download	64	—	73	18	—	—	—	—	16	—	
The Space Between the Darkness and the Light	Scheduled: March 5, 2027; Label: Alchemy, BMG; Format: CD, LP, digital download	—	—	—	—	—	—	—	—	—	—	
"—" denotes a recording that did not chart in that territory.

=== Live albums ===
List of live albums, with selected chart positions
Title	Album details	Peak chart positions
Title	Album details	US
Live at the Hiro Ballroom	Released: January 9, 2007; Label: Eagle Rock; Formats: DVD, CD	—
Live from Mohegan Sun	Released: July 10, 2012; Label: Eagle Rock; Formats: CD, streaming, digital download	127
Live: It's Been Awhile	Released: May 7, 2021; Label: Alchemy, BMG; Formats: CD, LP, streaming, digital download	— (Note: Live: It's Been Awhile did not enter the US Billboard 200, but peaked at number 70 on the Top Album Sales chart.)
Break the Cycle (25th Anniversary Live)	Released: August 21, 2026; Label: Alchemy, BMG; Formats: CD, LP, streaming, digital download	— (Note: Break the Cycle (25th Anniversary Live) did not enter the US Billboard 200, but peaked at number 28 on the Top Album Sales chart.)

=== Compilation albums ===
List of compilation albums, with selected chart positions
Title	Album details	Peak chart positions	
Title	Album details	US	NZ
The Singles: 1996–2006	Released: November 14, 2006; Label: Atlantic; Formats: CD, CS	41	14
iTunes Originals	Released: December 16, 2008; Label: Atlantic; Formats: Digital download	—	—

=== Video albums ===
List of video albums, with certifications
Title	Album details	Certifications
MTV Unplugged	Released: November 20, 2001; Label: Elektra; Formats: DVD	RIAA: Gold
The Videos	Released: November 14, 2006; Label: Elektra; Formats: DVD	
Live from Mohegan Sun	Released: August 14, 2012; Label: Eagle Vision; Formats: DVD, Blu-ray	
It's Been Awhile: Live from Foxwoods 2019	Released: August 6, 2021; Label: Alchemy; Formats: DVD	

== Singles ==
List of singles, with selected chart positions and certifications, showing year released and album name
Title	Year	Peak chart positions											Certifications	Album
Title	Year	US	US Adult	US Alt.	US Hard Rock	US Main. Rock	AUS	GER	IRL	NLD	SWE	UK	Certifications	Album
"Just Go" (Note: "Suffocate" and "Just Go" were released together as a double A-side single in the United States.)	1998	—	—	—	—	24	—	—	—	—	—	—		Dysfunction
"Mudshovel"	1999	—	—	14	—	10	—	—	—	—	—	—		Dysfunction
"Home"	1999	—	—	17	—	11	—	—	—	—	—	—		Dysfunction
"It's Been Awhile"	2001	5	6	1	2	1	24	43	18	19	23	15	RIAA: 8× Platinum; ARIA: Gold; BPI: Gold; RMNZ: 3× Platinum	Break the Cycle
"Outside"	2001	— (Note: "Outside" did not enter the Billboard Hot 100, but peaked at number 11 on the Bubbling Under Hot 100 chart.)	—	16	10	11	88	73	33	71	52	33	BPI: Silver; RMNZ: Platinum	Break the Cycle
"Fade"	2001	62	—	4	—	3	86	—	—	—	—	—		Break the Cycle
"For You"	2001	63	—	3	—	3	—	—	—	—	—	53		Break the Cycle
"Epiphany"	2002	—	—	28	—	22	—	—	—	—	—	—		Break the Cycle
"Price to Play"	2003	66	—	6	—	2	66	—	41	—	—	36		14 Shades of Grey
"So Far Away"	2003	24	16	1	10	1	—	—	—	—	—	—	RMNZ: Gold	14 Shades of Grey
"How About You"	2004	— (Note: "How About You" did not enter the Billboard Hot 100, but peaked at number 19 on the Bubbling Under Hot 100 chart.)	—	10	—	10	—	—	—	—	—	—		14 Shades of Grey
"Right Here"	2005	55	7	3	—	1	—	—	—	—	—	—	RIAA: Gold	Chapter V
"Falling"	2005	—	—	19	—	7	—	—	—	—	—	—		Chapter V
"Everything Changes"	2006	—	33	32	—	22	—	—	—	—	—	—		Chapter V
"King of All Excuses"	2006	—	—	—	—	27	—	—	—	—	—	—		Chapter V
"Believe"	2008	83	28	1	—	4	—	—	—	—	—	—		The Illusion of Progress
"All I Want"	2008	—	—	21	—	20	—	—	—	—	—	—		The Illusion of Progress
"This Is It"	2009	—	—	38	—	27	—	—	—	—	—	—		The Illusion of Progress
"Not Again"	2011	— (Note: "Not Again" did not enter the Billboard Hot 100, but peaked at number 22 on the Bubbling Under Hot 100 chart.)	—	14	6	1	—	—	—	—	—	—		Staind
"Eyes Wide Open"	2011	—	—	34	—	5	—	—	—	—	—	—		Staind
"Now"	2012	—	—	—	—	10	—	—	—	—	—	—		Staind
"Something to Remind You"	2012	— (Note: "Something to Remind You" did not enter the Billboard Hot 100, but peaked at number 19 on the Bubbling Under Hot 100 chart.)	—	—	2	34	—	—	—	—	—	—		Staind
"Lowest in Me"	2023	—	—	40	3	1	—	—	—	—	—	—		Confessions of the Fallen
"Here and Now"	2023	—	—	—	9	2	—	—	—	—	—	—		Confessions of the Fallen
"Better Days" (original or featuring Dorothy)	2024	—	—	—	—	7	—	—	—	—	—	—		Confessions of the Fallen
"Ghosts"	2026	— (Note: "Ghosts" did not enter the Hot 100, but peaked at number 7 on the US Digital Songs chart.)	—	—	—	4	—	—	—	—	—	—		The Space Between the Darkness and the Light
"Watch Me Break"	2026	—	—	—	—	—	—	—	—	—	—	—		The Space Between the Darkness and the Light
"—" denotes a recording that did not chart in that territory.

== Promotional singles ==
List of singles as lead artist, showing year released and album name
Year	Title	Peak chart positions	Album
Year	Title	US Hard Rock Digi.	Album
1998	"Suffocate"	—	Dysfunction
2003	"Layne"	—	14 Shades of Grey
2004	"Zoe Jane"	—	14 Shades of Grey
2005	"Schizophrenic Conversations"	—	Chapter V
2009	"The Way I Am"	—	The Illusion of Progress
2009	"Pardon Me"	—	The Illusion of Progress
2009	"Lost Along the Way"	—	The Illusion of Progress
2011	"Wannabe" (solo or featuring Snoop Dogg)	—	Staind
2011	"Throw It All Away"	—	Staind
2011	"The Bottom"	—	Staind
2023	"Cycle of Hurting"	16	Confessions of the Fallen
2023	"In This Condition"	—	Confessions of the Fallen

== Other appearances ==
Year	Album	Song(s)	Label	Ref(s)
1999	Wonderdrug: Up the Dosage	"Spleen" (demo)	Wonderdrug Records	
2000	Scream 3: The Album	"Crawl"	Wind-up Records	
2000	The Family Values Tour 1999	"Mudshovel"	Interscope Records	
2000	MTV The Return of the Rock	"Just Go"	Roadrunner Records	
2000	Take a Bite Outta Rhyme: A Rock Tribute to Rap	"Bring the Noise" (featuring Fred Durst)	UMVD Labels	
2002	Live & Unreleased From Farmclub.Com	"Mudshovel"	Interscope Records	
2002	WWF Tough Enough 2	"Take It"	Universal Records	
2002	The Family Values Tour 2001	"Fade", "It's Been Awhile"	Elektra Records/WEA	
2002	NASCAR on Fox: Crank It Up	"See Through" (2002 version)	MCA Records	
2002	Big Shiny Tunes 7	"It's Been Awhile"	Universal Records	
2005	WCCC Live at Planet of Sound	"Layne" (acoustic)	WCCC/Planet of Sound	
2006	WCCC Live at Planet of Sound, Vol. 2	"So Far Away" (acoustic)	WCCC/Planet of Sound	
2009	Transformers: Revenge of the Fallen – The Album	"This Is It"	Reprise Records	
2011	Download to Donate: Tsunami Relief	"Right Here" (live)	Machine Shop Records/Warner Bros. Records	
2011	Transformers: Dark of the Moon – The Album	"The Bottom"	Warner Bros. Records	
2012	NASCAR The Game: Inside Line	"Now"		

== Music videos ==
List of music videos, showing year released and director
Title	Year	Director(s)	Album
"Just Go"	1998	Fred Durst	Dysfunction
"Mudshovel"	1999	Gregory Dark	Dysfunction
"Home"	1999	Fred Durst	Dysfunction
"It's Been Awhile"	2001	Fred Durst	Break The Cycle
"Fade"	2001	Marcus Raboy	Break The Cycle
"Outside"	2001	Nigel Dick	Break The Cycle
"For You"	2001	Nigel Dick	Break The Cycle
"Epiphany"	2002	Fred Durst	Break The Cycle
"Price to Play"	2003	The Brothers Strause	14 Shades Of Grey
"So Far Away"	2003	Nigel Dick	14 Shades Of Grey
"Right Here"	2005	Nathan Cox	Chapter V
"Falling"	2005	Mike Sloat	Chapter V
"Everything Changes"	2006	Mike Sloat	Chapter V
"Believe"	2008	Christopher Sims	The Illusion Of Progress
"All I Want"	2008	Christopher Sims	The Illusion Of Progress
"The Way I Am"	2008	Christopher Sims	The Illusion Of Progress
"Not Again"	2011	P. R. Brown	Staind
"Eyes Wide Open"	2012	From live footage broadcast	Staind
"Lowest In Me"	2023	DJay Brawner	Confessions of the Fallen
"Here and Now"	2023	Brad Golowin	Confessions of the Fallen
"Ghosts"	2026	Unknown	The Space Between The Darkness And The Light
