= Staind: The Videos =

2006 DVD by Staind

Video by Staind
- Released: November 14, 2006
- Genres: Alternative metal, nu metal, post-grunge
- Label: Atlantic

Staind: The Videos is a DVD by American rock band Staind. It was released by Atlantic Records on November 14, 2006. A companion singles collection, called The Singles: 1996–2006, was released on the same date. Notable is the absence of the video to the studio version of "Outside".

== Track listing ==
1. "Just Go"
2. "Mudshovel"
3. "Home"
4. "Outside" (Family Values live version, featuring Fred Durst)
5. "It's Been Awhile"
6. "Fade"
7. "For You"
8. "Epiphany"
9. "Price to Play"
10. "How About You"
11. "So Far Away"
12. "Right Here"
13. "Falling"
14. "Everything Changes"

=== Bonus tracks ===
1. "Sober" (Tool cover) (live acoustic)
2. "Everything Changes" (live acoustic)
