= The Singles: 1996–2006 =

Compilation album by Staind
- Released: November 14, 2006
- Recorded: 1996–2006
- Genres: Alternative metal; alternative rock; post-grunge; nu metal
- Length: 72:44
- Labels: Flip; Atlantic
- Producers: Staind; Fred Durst

Staind chronology
| Chapter V (2005) | The Singles: 1996–2006 (2006) | The Illusion of Progress (2008) |

Professional ratings
Review scores
| Source | Rating |
|---|---|
| AllMusic | 3/5 stars |
| Metal Hammer | 8/10 stars |
| PopMatters | 8/10 stars |

The Singles: 1996–2006 is a compilation album by the American rock band Staind, which was released through their current record label Atlantic Records in the UK on November 13, 2006, and in the US on November 14, 2006. A companion DVD, called Staind: The Videos, was released on the same date.

== Track listing ==
The Singles: 1996→2006 track listing
| No. | Title | Length |
|---|---|---|
| 1. | "Come Again" (Tormented) | 3:47 |
| 2. | "Mudshovel" (Dysfunction) | 4:41 |
| 3. | "Home" (Dysfunction) | 4:04 |
| 4. | "Outside" (Family Values Version featuring Fred Durst; The Family Values Tour 1999) | 5:40 |
| 5. | "It's Been Awhile" (Break the Cycle) | 4:25 |
| 6. | "For You" (Break the Cycle) | 3:26 |
| 7. | "Epiphany" (Break the Cycle) | 4:16 |
| 8. | "So Far Away" (14 Shades of Grey) | 4:03 |
| 9. | "Price to Play" (14 Shades of Grey) | 3:36 |
| 10. | "Zoe Jane" (14 Shades of Grey) | 4:36 |
| 11. | "Right Here" (Chapter V) | 4:13 |
| 12. | "Falling" (Chapter V) | 4:20 |
| 13. | "Everything Changes" (live at the Hiro Ballroom) | 4:23 |
| 14. | "Nutshell" (Alice in Chains cover; live at the Hiro Ballroom) | 4:38 |
| 15. | "Sober" (Tool cover; live at the Hiro Ballroom) | 6:18 |
| 16. | "Comfortably Numb" (Pink Floyd cover; live at the Hiro Ballroom) | 6:03 |
| 17. | "Outside" (live at the Hiro Ballroom) | 5:21 |
| 18. | "It's Been Awhile" (live at the Hiro Ballroom) | 4:55 |
| Total length: | | 72:44 |

Bonus tracks
| No. | Title | Length |
|---|---|---|
| 17. | "Schizophrenic Conversations" (live at the Hiro Ballroom; Best Buy version only) | 4:51 |
| 18. | "Reply" (live at the Hiro Ballroom; Best Buy and Japan versions) | 4:10 |
| 19. | "Devil" (live at the Hiro Ballroom; Rhapsody/Napster edition only) | 5:55 |
| 20. | "Falling" (live at the Hiro Ballroom; pre-order bonus download) | 6:52 |
| 21. | "Right Here" (live at the Hiro Ballroom; fan club LP edition) | 4:27 |

=== Notes ===
- Despite being singles, "Suffocate", "Just Go", "Fade", "How About You" and "King of All Excuses" did not make the tracklist.
- "Sober" (live at the Hiro Ballroom) has slightly different lyrics than Tool in the chorus.

== Charts ==
Chart performance for The Singles: 1996→2006
| Chart (2006) | Peak position |
|---|---|
| New Zealand Albums (RMNZ) | 14 |
| UK Rock & Metal Albums (Official Charts) | 40 |
| US Billboard 200 | 41 |
| US Top Rock Albums (Billboard) | 11 |
