= Believe (Staind song) =

2008 single by Staind

- The single cover for "Believe"

Single by Staind

from the album The Illusion of Progress
- Released: June 24, 2008
- Recorded: 2008
- Genre: Alternative rock
- Length: 4:17
- Label: Flip; Atlantic; Roadrunner
- Songwriters: Aaron Lewis; Mike Mushok; Johnny April; Jon Wysocki
- Producer: Johnny K

Staind singles chronology
"King of All Excuses" (2006)	"Believe" (2008)	"All I Want" (2008)

Music video
- "Believe" on YouTube

"Believe" is a song by the American rock band Staind. It was released through Flip Records, Atlantic Records, and Roadrunner Records on June 24, 2008, as the first single from the band's sixth studio album, The Illusion of Progress (2008). It was written by all four members of Staind: Aaron Lewis, Mike Mushok, Johnny April, and Jon Wysocki. An alternative rock song, it is a ballad which discusses overcoming adversity. Reviewers generally considered the song to be more optimistic than previous songs by the band. Johnny K helmed production and engineering, while Ryan Williams handled mixing duties.

"Believe" peaked at number 83 on the Billboard Hot 100 and appeared on several rock and pop radio charts in North America. These include Hot Modern Rock Tracks, where it spent three weeks at number one; and Hot Mainstream Rock Tracks, where it entered the top five. The song drew mixed reviews from music critics; some praised it for its positivity, while others considered it overly reminiscent of the band's past material.

Christopher Sims directed the song's music video, which chronicles a man who embarks on a road trip across the United States after fleeing a failing relationship.

== Background and release ==
Staind released their fifth studio album, Chapter V, in 2005. The album was a commercial success, helped by its lead single, "Right Here". When the band began working on a follow-up, its four members—vocalist and rhythm guitarist Aaron Lewis, lead guitarist Mike Mushok, bassist Johnny April, and drummer Jon Wysocki—intended the resulting album to be their most metallic yet. They instead diversified their influences by drawing from softer sources of inspiration. Lewis cited Pink Floyd and blues music as examples of influences, and told MTV News that pedal steel guitar and a gospel choir would appear on the album. At the same time, the band felt industry pressure to release a ballad in the vein of earlier singles such as "It's Been Awhile" and "Outside".

On June 19, 2008, the band announced an August 19 release date for their sixth studio album, The Illusion of Progress. Five days later, Flip Records and Atlantic Records released "Believe" as the album's lead single in the United States; Roadrunner Records handled its release in the United Kingdom.

== Composition and recording ==
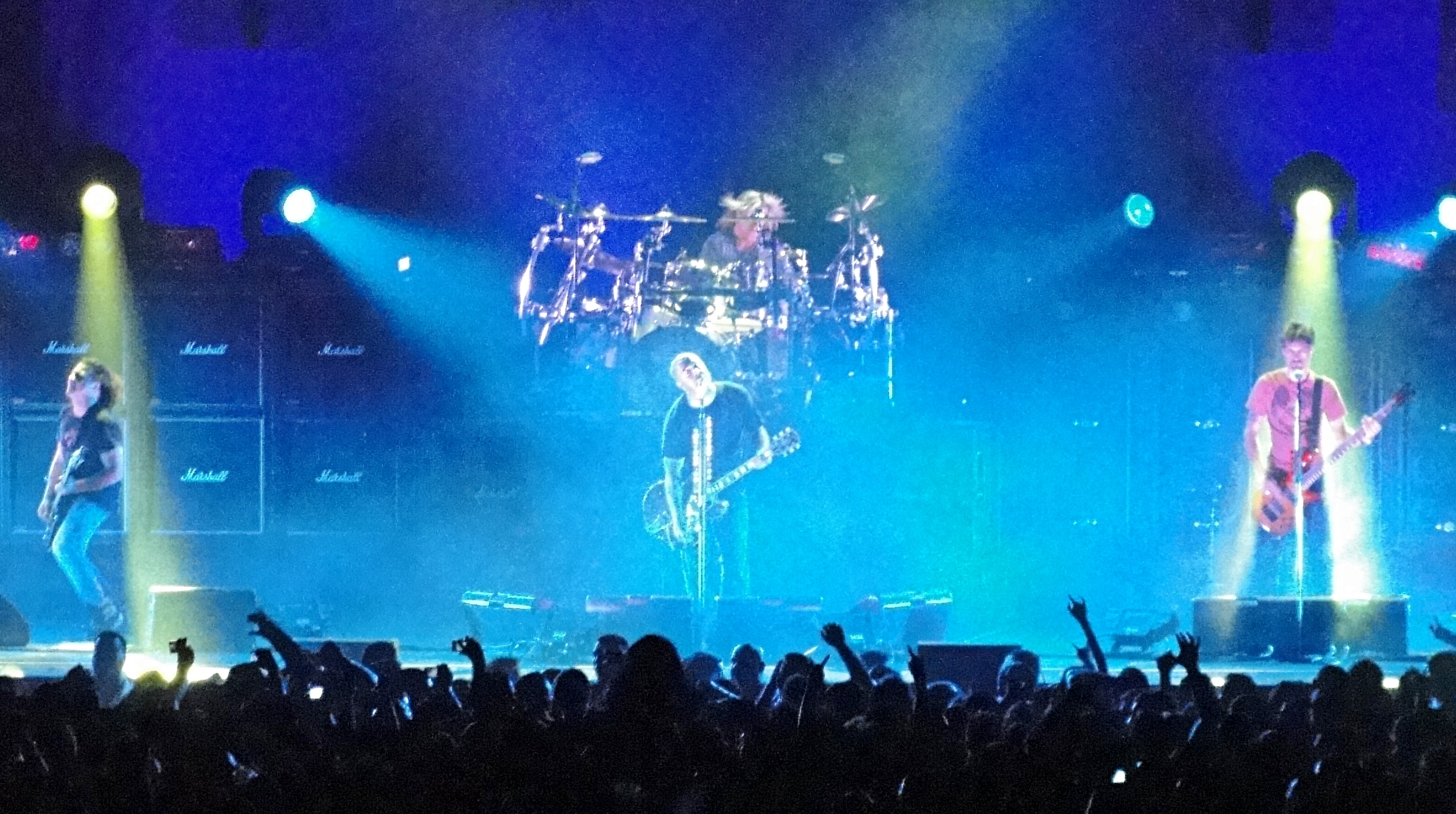
Staind performing in 2009

Lewis, Mushok, April, and Wysocki wrote "Believe". The song is an alternative rock ballad with influences from pop rock. Johnny K produced and engineered the song at Lewis's home studio, while Ryan Williams mixed it. Most commenters considered the song's lyrical message to be more optimistic than the band's earlier material. Its lyrics address overcoming adversity and mention being "made for chasing dreams". Cillea Houghton of American Songwriter remarked that the lyrics employ dark symbolism such as "the devil, fake smiles, and crying oneself to sleep". She called the song "quintessential Staind" and opined that strife was still at its emotional core. In an interview with The Aquarian Weekly, Mushok described "Believe" as the song on The Illusion of Progress that sounded most typical of the band's previous material.

Guitar tablature published at Musicnotes.com by Warner Chappell Music sets "Believe" in common time at a tempo of 120 beats per minute and in the key of D major. The intro and verses follow a chord progression of G–F#–G–A–B, switching to G–B–F#–A for the chorus. Lewis's vocals span a range from the low note of D_{4} to the high note of G_{5}.

== Commercial performance ==
"Believe" appeared on multiple rock and pop charts in North America. It debuted at number 27 on Billboard's Hot Modern Rock Tracks (later renamed Alternative Airplay) and number 25 on Hot Mainstream Rock Tracks (later renamed Mainstream Rock Airplay). The song reached number one on the former chart in September, becoming the band's third to do so after "It's Been Awhile" in 2001 and "So Far Away" in 2003, and remained at the summit for three weeks. On the latter chart, "Believe" peaked at number four, also in September. It ultimately spent a total of 21 weeks on each chart. Billboard ranked it at numbers 14 and 15 on its year-end tallies for Hot Modern Rock Tracks and Hot Mainstream Rock Tracks, respectively. In addition, "Believe" peaked at number seven on Billboard's Canada Rock chart in October.

The song peaked at number 83 on the Billboard Hot 100 in September during a non-consecutive three-week run; it is the band's most recent appearance there as of October 2026. On Billboard's Adult Top 40 chart (later renamed Adult Pop Airplay), the song debuted at number 40 in August and peaked at number 28 in November, spending a total of 16 weeks on the survey. It also peaked at number 78 on the Pop 100.

== Critical reception ==
"Believe" drew a mixed response from music critics. Steve Morse of The Boston Globe deemed the song "essential" and the best on The Illusion of Progress, and commended its uplifting message. Billboard's Gary Graff also praised the song for its positivity, as well as its catchiness. In November 2022, American Songwriter ranked "Believe" as Staind's eighth-best song, acclaiming it as emotionally resonant. Conversely, Consequence of Sound twice lambasted the song: When reviewing the album upon release, writer Alex Young panned "Believe" for its perceived similarity to "Right Here". In July 2017, the magazine ranked it 349th out of the 354 songs which had topped Alternative Airplay (then named Alternative Songs), characterizing the song as a rehash of past successes. In his album review for the Los Angeles Times, Steve Appleford expressed that "Believe" was too familiar compared to other, more experimental songs on the album, and dismissed it as "mushy sameness".

== Music video ==
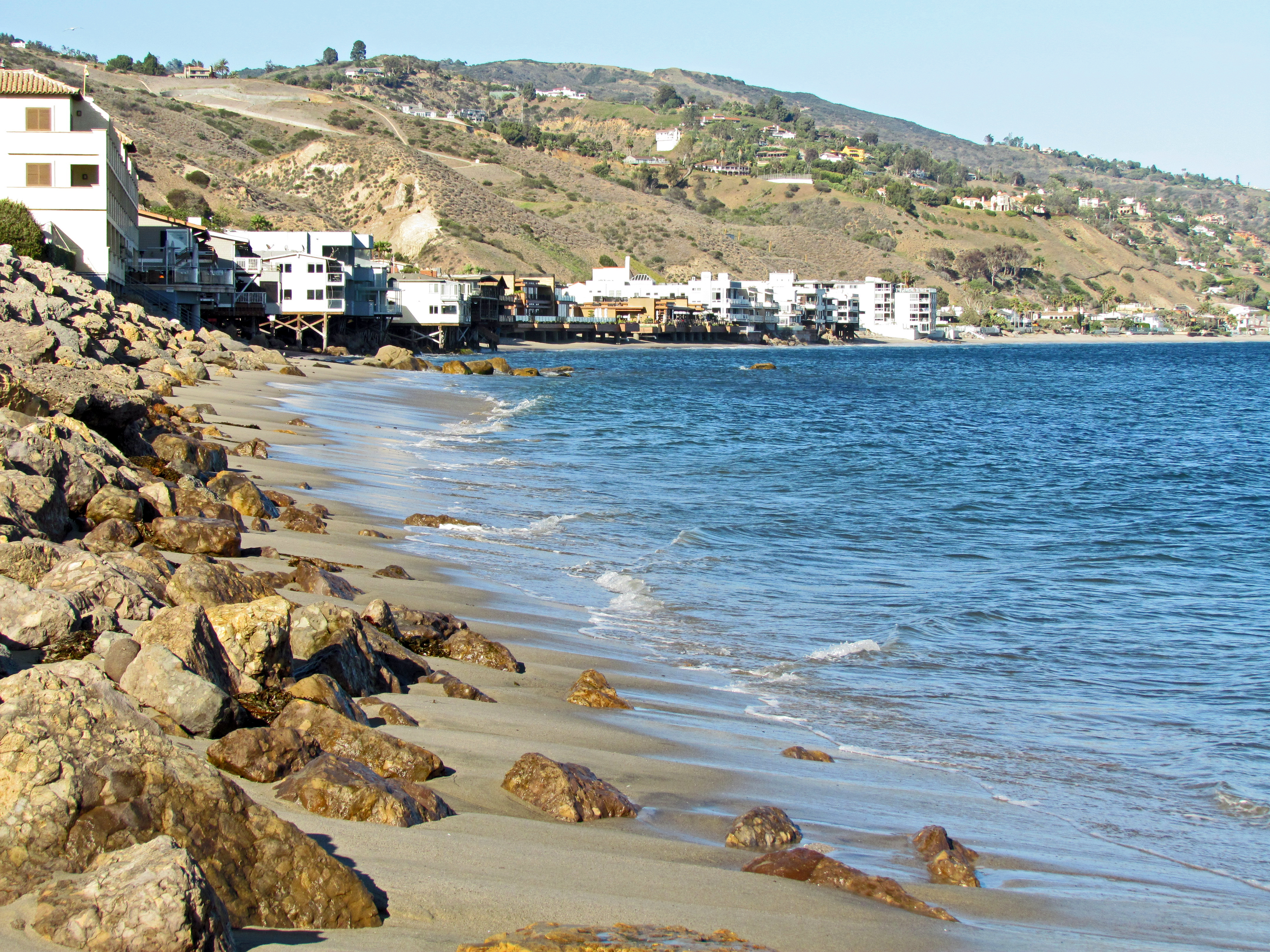
The music video for "Believe" concludes on a rocky California beach, stated by Aaron Lewis to be somewhere in Malibu (pictured in 2014).

Christopher Sims directed the music video for "Believe", which premiered on July 28, 2008. The protagonist of the video is a man named Rob who leaves home with some belongings, including a guitar, and places a goodbye letter for his girlfriend, Elise. Rob proceeds to embark on a solo road trip across the United States, passing landmarks such as the Washington Monument and Reflecting Pool; the Gateway Arch; the Great Plains; and the Rocky Mountains. He is about midway through the trip when the video cuts to Elise walking in the door and reading the goodbye letter, much to her distress. Shots of Rob's progress towards the West Coast are intertwined with shots of Elise sitting alone on a couch, before she eventually gets up and leaves to find Rob. While he is traversing the Great Plains, his car breaks down, forcing him to hitchhike the rest of the way. The video ends with Rob sitting on a large rock on a beach, happily playing guitar. Scenes of Lewis singing while walking down the same beach are interspersed throughout the video; he also briefly appears in the back of Rob's car.

When interviewed by MTV, Lewis indicated that the music video was originally going to feature the band embarking on the road trip. He told MTV that the trip would conclude on a beach in Malibu, California. The music video for follow-up single "All I Want", also directed by Sims, continues the story from the "Believe" music video, and features Elise traveling across the country to see Rob.

== Personnel ==
Credits are adapted from Bandcamp and the packaging of The Illusion of Progress.

Staind

- Aaron Lewis – lead vocals, rhythm guitar
- Mike Mushok – lead guitar
- Johnny April – bass guitar
- Jon Wysocki – percussion

Technical

- Johnny K – production, engineering
- Ryan Williams – mixing

== Charts ==
=== Weekly charts ===
Weekly chart performance for "Believe"
Chart (2008)	Peak position
Canada Rock (Billboard)	7
US Billboard Hot 100	83
US Adult Pop Airplay (Billboard)	28
US Alternative Airplay (Billboard)	1
US Mainstream Rock Airplay (Billboard)	4
US Pop 100 (Billboard)	78

=== Year-end charts ===
Year-end chart performance for "Believe"
Chart (2008)	Position
US Alternative Airplay (Billboard)	14
US Mainstream Rock (Billboard)	15
