= 2008 in rock music =

This article summarizes the events related to rock music for the year of 2008.

== Notable events ==
=== January ===
- Radiohead releases their seventh studio album, In Rainbows. It tops the US all-format Billboard 200 albums chart, selling 122,000 copies. This is less than half of the debut of their prior album, 2003's Hail to the Thief, though multiple factors make comparisons difficult. In Rainbows had sold over 9,000 copies the week prior due to so many retailers breaking the street date, enough for it to chart at number 157. Additionally, the entire album had previously been released in October 2007, where purchasers were allowed to pay whatever price they wanted to in order to buy it from the band's website, and sales figures from this experiment were not included.
- The soundtrack for the film Juno, which contains contributions from rock bands such as The Kinks and The Velvet Underground, spends most of the month in the top 10 of the Billboard 200 album's chart, eventually topping it for a single week.
- The Mars Volta releases their fourth studio album, The Bedlam in Goliath. The album debuts at number 3 on the Billboard 200 chart, selling 54,000 copies. It is their highest debuting chart position on the chart, though sales numbers are less than their prior two albums.
- Bullet for my Valentine releases their second studio album, Scream Aim Fire. It debuts at number 4 on the Billboard 200 chart, selling 53,000 copies in its debut week.
- Finger Eleven's single "Paralyzer" peaks at number 6 on the US all-format Billboard Hot 100 chart. Its their highest and second of two songs to chart on the chart.
- Linkin Park's single "Shadow of the Day" peaks at number 15 on the Billboard Hot 100 chart.
- Paramore's single "Misery Business" peaks at number 26 on the Billboard Hot 100 chart.

=== February ===
- Lenny Kravitz releases his eighth studio album, It Is Time for a Love Revolution. It debuts at number 4 on the Billboard 200, selling 73,000 copies in its first week. It is his first album release in 4 years, and a marked improvements, selling over 20,000 copies more than 2004's Baptism.
- The Juno soundtrack places in the top 10 of the Billboard 200 moving into a second month.

=== March ===
- Panic! at the Disco releases their second studio album, Pretty. Odd.. It debuts at number 2 on the Billboard 200, selling 139,000 copies in its opening week. The album was the last to feature guitarist Ryan Ross and bassist Jon Walker, who left the band due to creative differences the following year.
- The Charlatans self-release their tenth studio album, You Cross My Path, as a free download in collaboration with Xfm. The NME reported that it had been downloaded over 60,000 times, which would have reached the number two position on the UK album chart had it been eligible. It was subsequently released physically through Cooking Vinyl; this version peaked at number 39 on the UK albums chart.
- Enter Shikari self-releases their debut studio album, Take to the Skies, through their own label, Ambush Reality. It peaked at number 4 on the UK albums chart and was certified gold.
- Counting Crows release their fifth studio album, Saturday Nights & Sunday Mornings. Despite difficult sessions spurred by frontman Adam Duritz personal issues at the time, the album is a success, debuting at number 3 on the Billboard 200, selling 106,000 copies in its opening week, their highest debut in 12 years.
- Flogging Molly releases their fourth studio album, Float. It is their highest charting debut of their career, debuting at number 4 on the Billboard 200, selling 48,000 copies.
- The Black Crowes release their seventh studio album, Warpaint. It debuts at number 5 on the Billboard 200, selling, 53,000 copies, making it their highest debut since 1992's The Southern Harmony and Musical Companion.
- The Raconteurs surprise-release their second studio album Consolers of the Lonely. It debuts at number 7 on the Billboard 200, selling 42,000 copies.
- Now That's What I Call Music 27 debuts at number 2 on the Billboard 200, selling 169,000 copies. The multi-genre compilation contains multiple rock songs, including Finger Eleven's "Paralyzer", Paramore's "Crushcrushcrush", Boys Like Girls "Hero/Heroine", and Santana's and Chad Kroeger's "Into the Night".

=== April ===
- R.E.M. releases their fourteenth studio album, Accelerate. It debuted at number 2 on the Billboard 200, selling 115,000 copies in its first week, their best debut in over a decade. It hangs on to fifth place in its second week, selling another 46,000 copies.
- The Courteeners release their debut studio album, St. Jude. It originally peaked at number four UK albums chart, and would later top the chart upon its 2023 reissue.
- Nine Inch Nails releases its sixth studio album, Ghosts I–IV. Despite being a 36 track of untitled instrumental recordings released for free the month prior, it still manages to debut at number 14 on the Billboard 200 chart, selling 26,000 copies.
- Ashes Divide, the solo-project of A Perfect Circle guitarist Billy Howerdel, releases their only studio album, Keep Telling Myself Its Alright. It sells a modest 16,000 copies in its opening week.
- P.O.D.'s releases its seventh studio album, When Angels & Serpents Dance. It debuts at number 9 on the Billboard 200 chart, selling 34,000 copies.
- New Zealand comedy rock duo Flight of the Conchords (Bret McKenzie and Jemaine Clement) release their debut studio album, Flight of the Conchords, consisting of songs from their television of the same name. The album debuts as number 3 on the Billboard 200, selling 52,000 copies in its opening week. In New Zealand, it debuts at number 2 on their national, all-format albums chart, and eventually goes double platinum.
- James releases its tenth studio album, Hey Ma. It was their first in seven years, after breaking up in 2001, and reforming in 2007. The album charted at number 10 in the UK.
- Tom Petty reforms Mudcrutch a band he had fronted but never released an album with in the 1970s prior to finding fame with the Heart Breakers, and finally records and releases their debut album, Mudcrutch. It debuts at number 8 on the Billboard 200 chart, selling 38,000 copies in its opening week.
- Daughtry has two singles peak in the top 30 of the Billboard Hot 100; "What About Now" and "Feels Like Tonight", at number 18 and 24 respectively.
- Disaster strikes a gothic rock concert and celebration in Quito when a fire engulfs the venue. 19 people are killed and at least 24 more injured.

=== May ===
- Death Cab for Cutie releases their sixth studio album, Narrow Stairs. It tops the Billboard 200 chart, selling 144,000 copies in its opening week. To date, it is the band's highest opening sales and only album to top the chart. It stays in the top 10 in its second week as well, holding on to the fifth spot.
- Filter releases oft-delayed fourth studio album, Anthems for the Damned. Initially started back in 2003, the album was put on hold for many years while frontman Richard Patrick entered rehab for drugs and alcohol, and then started up a new band, Army of Anyone, with members of Stone Temple Pilots. While Patrick reformed the band with new members in early 2008, the album failed to make a commercial impact, debuting and peaking at number 42 on the Billboard 200 chart.
- 3 Doors Down releases their fourth studio album, 3 Doors Down. It tops the Billboard 200 chart, selling 154,000 copies in its first week.
- Disturbed releases their fourth studio album, Indestructible. It tops the Billboard 200 chart, selling 252,000 copies in its opening week. It is their third straight album to top the chart, a feat then shared by only 6 other rock bands.
- Weezer releases their sixth studio album, Weezer (Red Album). It debuts at number 3 on the Billboard 200, selling 126,000 copies.
- Journey releases their thirteenth studio album, Revelation. The album is their first to be recorded by Arnel Pineda. It opens at number 5 on the Billboard 200, selling 105,000 copies. Its their highest sales debut since 1996, and a 1400% increase from their prior studio album.

=== June ===
- Coldplay releases their fourth studio album, Viva la Vida or Death and All His Friends. It tops the Billboard 200 chart in its opening week, selling 721,000 copies. It remains atop of the chart for a second week as well, selling another 249,000 copies in its second week. It slips to number 2 in its third week, selling another 113,000 - selling over a million cumulative copies in just 3 weeks of sale in the US.
- Coldplay's single "Viva la Vida" concurrently tops the Billboard Hot 100 single chart on the same week of its respective album's debut.
- Disturbed's Indestructible remains in the top ten of the Billboard 200 for multiple weeks in June.
- Shinedown releases their third studio album, The Sound of Madness. It debuts at number 8 on the Billboard 200, selling 50,000 copies. Despite the modest start, and troubled recording sessions, through successful singles and extensive touring, the album eventually goes double platinum, selling over 2 million copies.
- Flyleaf's single "All Around Me" peaks at number 40 on the Billboard Hot 100. It is the band's only song to ever appear on the chart.

=== July ===
- Nine Inch Nails's seventh studio album, The Slip, debuts at number 13 on the Billboard 200, selling 29,000 copies in its first week. The sales figure is particularly impressive considering the circumstance; the album had been purposefully released two months prior for free on the internet, and had been downloaded 1.4 million times prior to its official physical release. It was also the band's second free album of the year, after Ghosts I–IV.
- Coldplay's Viva la Vida or Death and All His Friends album continues to chart in the top 10 of the Billboard 200.

=== August ===
- Slipknot releases their fourth studio album, All Hope Is Gone. It tops the Billboard 200 chart, selling 239,516 copies in its first week. It is the band's first album to top the chart at the time of release. It holds on to the fifth place position in its second week, selling another 75,000 copies.
- Underoath releases their sixth studio album, Lost in the Sound of Separation. It debuts at number 8 on the Billboard 200, selling 56,000 copies in its opening week.
- Staind releases its sixth studio album, The Illusion of Progress. It debuts at number 3 on the Billboard 200, selling 92,000 copies. The release, more mellow than prior albums, was a marked decrease from their prior three albums, which all topped the chart, particularly 2001's Break the Cycle, which debuted with over 700,000 copies sold in its opening week.
- Paramore's single "That's What You Get" peaks at number 66 on the Billboard Hot 100.

=== September ===
- Metallica releases their first new album in five years, their ninth studio album, Death Magnetic. It tops the Billboard 200 chart, selling 490,000 copies in just 3 days of tracking, due to an adjusted release date for international sales. At the time of release, it is their fifth album to top the chart. It stays atop of the chart for three consecutive weeks total. The album performs well internationally as well; in its open week it tops over 20 other national album charts as well.
- Kings of Leon release their fourth studio album, Only by the Night. It debuts modestly at number 5 on the Billboard 200, but goes on to sell over 2 million copies in the US. Additionally, it tops the UK albums chart, and is certified the number one selling album of any type in Australia for the year of 2008.
- Staind's song "Believe" peaks at number 83 on the Billboard Hot 100. It is the band's last song to appear on the chart to date.

=== October ===
- Rise Against releases their fifth studio album, Appeal to Reason. It debuts at number 3 on the Billboard 200, selling 65,000 copies. At the time, it is their highest charting debut of their career.
- AC/DC releases their fifteenth studio album, and first in eight years, Black Ice. It tops the Billboard 200 chart, selling 784,000 copies in its opening week. This is the second-highest debut of 2008 at the time of its release. It stays atop of the chart for a second week as well, selling another 270,000 copies, moving a million units in just two weeks.
- Snow Patrol releases their fifth studio album, A Hundred Million Suns. It debuts at number 9 on the Billboard 200, selling 48,000 copies. It is also the second best selling album of the week in the UK upon release.
- McFly releases their fourth studio album, Radio:Active. It peaks at number 8 on the UK albums chart, and was certified gold.
- You Me at Six release their debut studio album, Take Off Your Colours. It peaks at number 25 on the UK albums chart and was certified gold.

=== November ===
- The Twilight soundtrack tops the Billboard 200 chart. It features contributions from rock bands including Muse, Paramore, Linkin Park, and Mutemath. Paramore's song "Decode" is selected as the lead single; it is a crossover success, charting in over 10 national all-format singles charts, and hitting number 33 in the US on the Hot 100 chart.
- Saving Abel's single "Addicted" peaks at number 20 on the Billboard Hot 100 chart. It is their only song to appear on the song to date.

=== December ===
- Fall Out Boy release their fourth studio album Folie a Deux. It debuts at number 8 on the Billboard 200 chart, moving just short of 150,000 copies.

=== Year end ===
- Kings of Leon's Only by the Night is the best selling album of the year in Australia.

== Deaths ==
- Bo Diddley - influential African-American rock guitarist, dies of heart failure.
- Richard Wright - of Pink Floyd, dies of cancer.

== Band breakups ==
- The Format
- Velvet Revolver (hiatus)
