= Not Again =

2011 single by Staind

Single by Staind

from the album Staind
- Released: July 19, 2011
- Genre: Alternative metal; nu metal
- Length: 4:34
- Label: Atlantic; Roadrunner
- Songwriters: Aaron Lewis; Mike Mushok; Johnny April; Jon Wysocki
- Producer: Johnny K

Staind singles chronology
"This Is It" (2009)	"Not Again" (2011)	"Eyes Wide Open" (2011)

Music video
- "Not Again" on YouTube

"Not Again" is a song by the American rock band Staind. It served as the lead single from the band's self-titled seventh studio album. The song was released on July 19, 2011. The song reached number 1 on the Mainstream Rock Tracks chart for seven non-consecutive weeks. A music video was released for the song.

== Background ==
According to singer Aaron Lewis, "Not Again" is about the recording process for the entire album, but is also open to the listener's interpretation: "It all manifested itself through the song–the duress and struggle that it was to make this record. I’ve always felt like if you tell people what the songs are about, as the writer...it kind of ruins the experience for the listener. It’s one of the great things about music, that from the listener’s point of view, they can see it for what they want to see it for. They can apply it to their life and how the words fit them, and not only see it through the face value of what it was written about."

== Track listing ==
Digital single
No.	Title	Length
1.	"Not Again"	4:34

== Charts ==
=== Weekly charts ===
Chart (2011)	Peak position
Canada Rock (Billboard)	18
US Bubbling Under Hot 100 (Billboard)	22
US Hot Rock & Alternative Songs (Billboard)	4

=== Year-end charts ===
Chart (2011)	Position
US Hot Rock & Alternative Songs (Billboard)	26
Chart (2012)	Position
US Hot Rock & Alternative Songs (Billboard)	79
