= Something to Remind You =

Something to Remind You may refer to:

- "Something to Remind You", a jazz fusion song by the Pat Metheny Group on the 1995 album We Live Here
- "Something to Remind You", a nu metal song by Staind on the 2011 self-titled album Staind
