= Transformers: Revenge of the Fallen – The Album =

2009 soundtrack album by Linkin Park and various artists

Transformers: Revenge of the Fallen - The Album

Soundtrack album by Various artists
- Released: June 12, 2009 (UK); June 23, 2009 (US)
- Recorded: 2007–2009
- Genres: Alternative rock; post-grunge; hard rock
- Length: 51:46
- Label: Reprise
- Producers: Mike Shinoda; Butch Vig; David Kahne; Aaron Johnson; Mike Flynn, Nickelback; Robert "Mutt" Lange; Matt Squire; Howard Benson; Eric Valentine; Johnny K; Avenged Sevenfold; Julian Raymond; Diarmuid Quinn

Singles from Transformers: Revenge of the Fallen - The Album
- 1. "New Divide" Released: May 18, 2009

Professional ratings
Review scores
Source	Rating
Allmusic	2/5 stars
Empire	3/5 stars
Rock on Request	(favorable)

Transformers: Revenge of the Fallen – The Album is a compilation album of various artists' music from the 2009 Transformers: Revenge of the Fallen. The official single is "New Divide" by Linkin Park. It was rumored that Dead by Sunrise would be releasing a track called "Crawl Back In" for the soundtrack. However, Chester Bennington said he decided not to include it. Similarly, Tyrese Gibson, who plays Sgt. Epps in the movie, said that he would be in a duet track with Jewel (produced by Babyface), titled "Make It Last", which he had hoped would appear in the film's soundtrack, but ultimately did not. The album charted at #7 on the US Billboard 200 album chart.

== Track listing ==
#	Title	Performer(s)	Notes
1	"New Divide"	Linkin Park	Ending Theme (leads into end credits); part of the instrumentals used in the track "NEST" from the film score. Additionally, part of this song is played approximately half way through the movie, as the characters search for help in deciphering the symbols.
2	"21 Guns"	Green Day	2nd song in the end credits; also played during Sam and Mikaela's phone conversation at the beginning of the film and while Mikaela waits for Sam for their online chat and while Sam moves into his dorm.
3	"Let It Go"	Cavo	5th song in the end credits.
4	"Capital M-E"	Taking Back Sunday	4th song on the end credits.
5	"Never Say Never"	The Fray	Played as Sam and Mikaela kissed goodbye before Sam left for college.
6	"Burn It to the Ground"	Nickelback	Second song played at the frat party in Sam's college, where Alice first attempts to seduce him.
7	"Burning Down the House"	The Used	First song played at the frat party in Sam's college.
8	"Not Meant to Be"	Theory of a Deadman	Not used in film.
9	"Real World"	The All-American Rejects	Not used in film.
10	"I Don't Think I Love You"	Hoobastank	Not used in film.
11	"This Is It"	Staind	3rd song in the end credits.
12	"Almost Easy"	Avenged Sevenfold	Originally planned to be released for the first movie, but was not completed in time. Not used in film.
13	"Transformers: The Fallen Remix"	Cheap Trick	Not used in film.

=== Not included in the soundtrack ===
#	Title	Performer(s)	Notes
1	"I'm So Excited"	The Pointer Sisters	Played on Bumblebee's radio when Sam tells him he is going to college.
2	"Your Cheatin' Heart"	Hank Williams	Played on Bumblebee's radio while Sam is having a conversation with Alice.
3	"Main Title (Theme from 'Jaws')"	John Williams	Played on Bumblebee's radio as Sam slams it after hearing the previous song.
4	"Super Freak"	Rick James	Played on Bumblebee's radio as Sam slams it while driving and talking to Alice.
5	"Brick House"	Commodores	Played on Bumblebee's radio while he sprays antifreeze on Alice.

== Charts ==
=== Weekly charts ===
Weekly chart performance for Transformers: Revenge of the Fallen – The Album
Chart (2009)	Peak position
Australian Albums (ARIA)	14
Austrian Albums (Ö3 Austria)	20
Belgian Albums (Ultratop Flanders)	99
French Albums (SNEP)	143
German Albums (Offizielle Top 100)	57
New Zealand Albums (RMNZ)	9
Swiss Albums (Schweizer Hitparade)	41
US Billboard 200	7
US Top Rock Albums (Billboard)	3
US Soundtrack Albums (Billboard)	1

=== Year-end charts ===
Year-end chart performance for Transformers: Revenge of the Fallen – The Album
Chart (2009)	Position
US Billboard 200	174
US Top Rock Albums (Billboard)	43
US Soundtrack Albums (Billboard)	11

== Release history ==
Release dates for Transformers: Revenge of the Fallen – The Album
Region	Release date
Australia	June 12, 2009
Worldwide	June 23, 2009
