= The Space Between the Darkness and the Light =

Studio album by Staind
- Released: March 5, 2027
- Genres: Alternative metal; post-grunge; nu metal
- Length: 34:25
- Labels: Alchemy; BMG
- Producer: Erik Ron

Staind chronology
Confessions of the Fallen (2023)	The Space Between the Darkness and the Light (2027)

Singles from The Space Between the Darkness and the Light
- 1. "Ghosts" Released: October 14, 2026; 2. "Watch Me Break" Released: November 11, 2026

The Space Between the Darkness and the Light is the upcoming ninth studio album by American rock band Staind, set to be released on March 5, 2027, via Alchemy Recordings and BMG. It comes four years after 2023's Confessions of the Fallen.

== Background and release ==
The lead single, "Ghosts", was released on October 12, 2026. That same day, Aaron Lewis revealed the album's title, saying "The struggle in the middle of dark and light is so fucking present throughout the entire album. It almost named itself. The title fit this collection because the songs are stuck in the conflict between opposite ends of the spectrum. There are a couple of songs where I'm straight up talking to God." The album was officially announced on November 11, with the second single "Watch Me Break" coinciding with it. Lewis said of that track "It was the last song I did because I knew I was going to be pretty angry throughout the whole thing. It's definitely pointed at this insane machine the music industry puts human beings in and expects them to come out normal."

== Track listing ==
All tracks are written by Aaron Lewis, Mike Mushok, Johnny April, Matt McGinn, and Erik Ron.

The Space Between the Darkness and the Light track listing
No.	Title	Length
1.	"Watch Me Break"	3:31
2.	"100 Mile Stare"	3:19
3.	"Broken"	3:17
4.	"All Along"	4:05
5.	"Ghosts"	3:12
6.	"Pull Me Down"	3:50
7.	"Digging My Own Grave"	3:54
8.	"Why"	2:58
9.	"Free"	2:54
10.	"Get Away"	3:25
Total length:		34:25

== Personnel ==
Staind

- Aaron Lewis – lead vocals
- Mike Mushok – lead guitar
- Johnny April – bass
- Sal Giancarelli – drums, percussion

Production

- Erik Ron – producer, mixing, engineer
- Ted Jensen – mastering
- Anthony Reeder – engineer
