= Fade (Staind song) =

2001 single by Staind

Single by Staind

from the album Break the Cycle
- Released: July 24, 2001
- Genre: Hard rock
- Length: 4:03
- Label: Flip; Elektra
- Songwriter: Aaron Lewis
- Producer: Josh Abraham

Staind singles chronology
"Outside" (2001)	"Fade" (2001)	"For You" (2001)

Music video
- "Fade" on YouTube

"Fade" is a song by American rock band Staind. It was the third single from their third studio album, Break the Cycle. The song was a success for the band, peaking at numbers three and four on the US Billboard Mainstream Rock Tracks and Modern Rock Tracks charts, respectively, as well as number 62 on the all-format Billboard Hot 100 chart.

== Background ==
The origins of the song trace back the recording sessions in the late 1990s, prior to the band releasing their second studio album, their first major record label album Dysfunction in 1999. The song's guitar riff was initially written for a six minute long "epic" sounding track, according to band guitarist Mike Mushok. The song was dropped from consideration for Dysfunction, and not worked on for three or four years, but Mushok, impressed with the melodies added by frontman Aaron Lewis, continued to keep it in the back of his mind for inclusion for future album's consideration. He eventually rewrote and re-arranged the track during the band's Break the Cycle sessions, where it made the cut for the album. In 2002, Mushok reflected that he believed the song to be his best personal performance of any songs he had ever recorded.

The song's first official release was on May 8, 2001, on the band's third studio album, Break the Cycle, a release that would eventually be certified five times platinum by the RIAA, indicated 5 million units shipped. After the release of "It's Been Awhile" and "Outside", "Fade" would later be released as the album's third single on September 4, 2001. The song performed well at rock radio, peaking at number 3 and 4 respectively on the US Billboard Mainstream Rock and Modern Rock song charts respectively, and even crossed over to the all-format radio stations, peaking at 62 on the Billboard Hot 100 chart. A live version of the song was released on the compilation album The Family Values Tour 2001, while an acoustic version of the song later appeared on the release Staind - MTV Unplugged in November 2002. The song also received its own music video, which alternates between the band performing in a crumbling watch tower and footage of a man in an office space.

== Composition and themes ==
The hard rock song maintains a standard verse-chorus song structure, with a bridge prior to the final chorus. The verses contains strummed, clean electric guitar notes being played, before expanding into loud, harmonized, distorted guitar parts. Rolling Stone described the song as having the heavy, minor key guitar riffs of nu metal, but that Lewis's dramatic vocal delivery made the music more comparable to the work of (alternative metal) band Alice in Chains than (nu metal) band Korn.

Lyrically, Lewis describes the song as being about parental neglect, namely his belief that "parents, on the whole, have forgotten how to be parents". He explains the lyrics of, "I just needed someone to talk to/You were just too busy with yourself," were about him feeling as if he had no one to turn to while growing up as a child.

== Reception ==
Spin, in its dedicated song review, praised the track for being "another moody, well-crafted ballad" by the band.

== Music video ==
The music video for the song was directed by Marcus Raboy. The video features clips of a child witnessing his parents devolve into violent confrontations while the band performs in front of a large pendulum inside of a clock tower.

== Personnel ==
- Aaron Lewis – lead vocals, rhythm guitar
- Mike Mushok – lead guitar
- Johnny April – bass, backing vocals
- Jon Wysocki – drums

== Charts ==
=== Weekly charts ===
Chart (2001)	Peak position
Australia (ARIA)	86
Canada (BDS)	45
Quebec Airplay (ADISQ)	17
US Billboard Hot 100	62
US Alternative Airplay (Billboard)	4
US Mainstream Rock (Billboard)	3

=== Year-end charts ===
Chart (2001)	Position
US Mainstream Rock Tracks (Billboard)	28
US Modern Rock Tracks (Billboard)	34

Chart (2002)	Position
US Modern Rock Tracks (Billboard)	49

== Release history ==
Region	Date	Format(s)	Label(s)	Ref.
United States	July 24, 2001	Alternative radio	Flip; Elektra	
United States	August 28, 2001	Mainstream rock; active rock radio	Flip; Elektra	
Australia	October 29, 2001	CD	Flip; Elektra	
