= Staind (album) =

Studio album by Staind
- Released: September 13, 2011
- Recorded: 2010–2011
- Genres: Alternative metal; nu metal
- Length: 42:08
- Labels: Atlantic; Roadrunner; Flip
- Producers: Johnny K; Staind

Staind chronology
The Illusion of Progress (2008)	Staind (2011)	Confessions of the Fallen (2023)

Singles from Staind
- 1. "Not Again" Released: July 18, 2011; 2. "Eyes Wide Open" Released: December 7, 2011; 3. "Now" Released: April 23, 2012; 4. "Something to Remind You" Released: October 9, 2012

Staind is the seventh studio album by American rock band Staind, released on September 13, 2011. It was released as a download, a standard CD and a limited deluxe digipak edition, which contains a DVD documenting the recording process of the album, plus two live bonus tracks (live in Houston) for the European digipak release.

The album marks a return to the band's heavier, more aggressive sound that was predominant on their first two albums. The album also brings back the guitar solos of Staind's first album Tormented. Rapper Snoop Dogg appears on the remix of the song "Wannabe", which appears as a Japanese bonus track. It is the band's last studio album to feature the full original lineup, as drummer Jon Wysocki left the band three days before the album was announced. It was also the band's last album for 12 years until the release of Confessions of the Fallen in 2023.

== Background and recording ==
The making of Staind was a stressful experience for the group. As lead singer Aaron Lewis stated, "By the end of the first month we weren't even recording in the same places anymore."

A number of factors created some tension within the group during recording. Despite the deadline on the album's completion approaching, with the album less than half finished, Lewis continued to do solo gigs to promote his solo album Town Line much to the other band members' discontent. In addition Lewis' working relationship with drummer Jon Wysocki broke down completely. Wysocki's departure from the group was announced on their website in May 2011.

Many songs were released before the album's official release date. The lead single, "Not Again", was made available as a streaming video on the band's official website on July 12, 2011. It was released to radio stations on July 19, 2011. "The Bottom" was released on the Transformers: Dark of the Moon soundtrack. Additionally, "Eyes Wide Open" was released on June 30, and the song "Paper Wings" was released on August 8.

The official music video for "Not Again" premiered August 30, 2011. The single topped the Mainstream Rock Songs chart for seven non-consecutive weeks, and peaked at No. 4 on the Rock Songs chart and No. 14 on the Alternative Songs chart. The second single was confirmed as "Eyes Wide Open". "Something to Remind You", despite not being a single, peaked at No. 19 on the Bubbling Under Hot 100, due to digital downloads. It would be released as the fourth single later on.

On September 15 Staind played a benefit concert for the September 11 victims and presented the new album. Eight of the ten total songs were performed, excluding "Take a Breath" and "Now".

"Now" was featured in the video game NASCAR The Game: Inside Line as part of the soundtrack.

== Music ==
The band views the album as a return to the more aggressive sound heard on earlier albums such as Dysfunction and Tormented. Mike Mushok said "It's like Dysfunction 2011. The music goes back to where we started, but there's still melody. We were ready to make an album that was heavy from beginning to end. It was time." Bassist Johnny April said "There's a deeper anger to the vocals and music. Some of the riffs Mike came up with were challenging and incredibly different. We've grown so much, and at the same time managed to find our way back to our roots."

== Critical reception ==
Professional ratings
Aggregate scores
Source	Rating
Metacritic	55/100
Review scores
Source	Rating
[&].com	4.5/5 stars
About.com	3/5 stars
AllMusic	3.5/5 stars
Artist Direct	5/5 stars
Consequence of Sound	2.5/5 stars
PopMatters	3/10 stars
Rolling Stone	2/5 stars
Spin	4/10
Ultimate-Guitar	7.7/10

The album debuted at number 5 on the Billboard 200, with first sales week of 47,000 copies, making the fifth consecutive top-five album for the band. However, the album has spent the least weeks of any Staind studio record on the chart, falling off after eight weeks. As of November 19, it has sold over 100,000 copies.

The album received a score of 55 out of 100 from Metacritic based on "mixed or average reviews", (according to seven critic scores) with some critics, including IGN (which gave it a score of 7.5 out of 10), calling it Staind's most mature and balanced release to date and praising the band for returning to their heavier, metal roots.

== Track listing ==
All lyrics are written by Aaron Lewis; all music is composed by Staind.

No.	Title	Length
1.	"Eyes Wide Open"	3:30
2.	"Not Again"	4:34
3.	"Failing"	5:26
4.	"Wannabe"	3:49
5.	"Throw It All Away"	4:24
6.	"Take a Breath"	3:56
7.	"The Bottom"	4:15
8.	"Now"	3:44
9.	"Paper Wings"	4:23
10.	"Something to Remind You"	4:07
Total length:		42:08

iTunes deluxe edition
No.	Title	Length
11.	"Spleen" (live in Houston)	4:50
12.	"Not Again" (featuring Kevin Curry*)	4:37
13.	"Not Again" (music video)	4:37
14.	"For You" (live in Houston) (iTunes pre-order exclusive)	3:32

Deluxe edition plus bonus DVD documentary
No.	Title	Length
1.	"Documentary"	1:01:40

European deluxe edition
No.	Title	Length
11.	"Spleen" (live in Houston)	4:50
12.	"For You" (live in Houston)	3:32

Japanese edition plus bonus track
No.	Title	Length
13.	"Wannabe" (remix) (featuring Snoop Dogg)	3:54
Total length:		46:00

Notes

- Kevin Curry is the guitar solo contest winner.

== Personnel ==
Staind

- Aaron Lewis – vocals, rhythm guitar
- Mike Mushok – lead guitar
- Johnny April – bass
- Jon Wysocki – drums

Production

- Johnny K – producer, engineer
- Matt Dougherty – digital editor
- Chris Lord-Alge – mixing
- Ted Jensen – mastering
- Keith Armstrong – assistant engineer
- Nik Carpen – assistant engineer
- Brad Townsend – additional mix engineer
- Andrew Schubert – additional mix engineer

== Charts ==
=== Weekly charts ===
Chart (2011)	Peak position
Australian Albums (ARIA)	100
Austrian Albums (Ö3 Austria)	47
German Albums (Offizielle Top 100)	25
Swiss Albums (Schweizer Hitparade)	32
UK Albums (Official Charts)	85
US Billboard 200	5
US Top Rock Albums (Billboard)	1

=== Year-end charts ===
Chart (2011)	Position
US Top Rock Albums (Billboard)	62

== Singles charts ==
=== Weekly charts ===
"Eyes Wide Open"
Chart (2011–2012)	Peak position
US Mainstream Rock (Billboard)	23

"Now"
Chart (2012)	Peak position
US Mainstream Rock (Billboard)	27

=== Year-end charts ===
"Eyes Wide Open"
Chart (2012)	Position
US Hot Rock & Alternative Songs (Billboard)	70

"Now"
Chart (2012)	Position
US Hot Rock & Alternative Songs (Billboard)	89
