= Confessions of the Fallen =

Studio album by Staind
- Released: September 22, 2023
- Recorded: 2019–2022
- Studios: Loud (Nashville); Grey Area (Burbank) (Note: Also mixing); Rehearsal (Ludlow); Sterling Sound (Nashville) (Note: Mastering)
- Genres: Alternative metal; post-grunge; nu metal
- Length: 35:22 (standard edition); 45:15 (deluxe edition)
- Labels: Alchemy; BMG
- Producer: Erik Ron

Staind chronology
Staind (2011)	Confessions of the Fallen (2023)	The Space Between the Darkness and the Light (2027)

Singles from Confessions of the Fallen
- 1. "Lowest in Me" Released: April 19, 2023; 2. "Here and Now" Released: September 12, 2023; 3. "Better Days" Released: April 19, 2024

Confessions of the Fallen is the eighth studio album by American rock band Staind. This is the band's first album in twelve years, marking the longest gap between studio albums to date. It was released on September 22, 2023. It is also the first album to feature new drummer Sal Giancarelli, who replaced original drummer Jon Wysocki following the latter's departure in 2011. It is the band's first album to be released from BMG.

== Production ==
Mike Mushok said that Aaron Lewis wanted to experiment with synthesizers and had worked with a programmer to develop these sounds, so the first single "Lowest in Me" has a few synthesizers.

== Promotion ==
On March 27, 2023, Staind and Godsmack announced a 25-city co-headlining U.S. tour to support Confessions of the Fallen and Lighting Up the Sky respectively, starting on July 18 at St. Louis' Hollywood Casino Amphitheatre and finishing on August 31 at Austin's Germania Insurance Amphitheater. On October 23, the band announced an eight-date 2024 radio tour, beginning on April 18 at the St. Augustine Amphitheatre and ending on May 4 at St. Paul's Xcel Energy Center. On November 14, Staind announced an 11-date spring 2024 run titled the "Tailgate Tour", with Seether, Saint Asonia and Tim Montana joining the tour, starting on April 22 at the Brandon Amphitheater and finishing on May 15 at Pelham's Oak Mountain Amphitheatre.

== Critical reception ==
Professional ratings
Review scores
Source	Rating
AllMusic	3/5 stars
Blabbermouth	8.5/10
Wall of Sound	7/10

AllMusic's review said that "Bolstered by the potent singles 'Lowest in Me' and 'Cycle of Hurting', Confessions of the Fallen stays true to the Staind formula (dark, heavy, introspective, and anthemic), with some tasteful electronic flourishes giving the foundation a fresh coat of paint".

== Track listing ==
All tracks are written by Aaron Lewis, Mike Mushok, Johnny April, Matt McGinn, and Erik Ron.

Confessions of the Fallen track listing
No.	Title	Length
1.	"Lowest in Me"	3:07
2.	"Was Any of It Real?"	2:51
3.	"In This Condition"	3:29
4.	"Here and Now"	3:57
5.	"Out of Time"	3:15
6.	"Cycle of Hurting"	3:49
7.	"The Fray"	4:03
8.	"Better Days"	3:45
9.	"Hate Me Too"	3:16
10.	"Confessions of the Fallen"	3:50
Total length:		35:22

Deluxe edition bonus tracks
No.	Title	Length
11.	"Take"	3:12
12.	"Full of Emptiness"	2:55
13.	"Better Days" (featuring Dorothy)	3:46
Total length:		45:15

== Personnel ==
Credits adapted from AllMusic.

Staind

- Aaron Lewis – lead vocals
- Mike Mushok – lead guitar
- Johnny April – bass
- Sal Giancarelli – drums, percussion

Additional personnel

- Erik Ron – producer, mixing, engineer
- Ted Jensen – mastering
- Justin Shturtz – mastering
- Anthony Reeder – engineer
- Ben Kitterman – management
- Keith Koening – design, layout

== Charts ==
Chart (2023)	Peak position
Austrian Albums (Ö3 Austria)	73
German Albums (Offizielle Top 100)	18
Scottish Albums (Official Charts)	39
Swiss Albums (Schweizer Hitparade)	16
UK Album Downloads (Official Charts)	8
UK Independent Albums (Official Charts)	10
UK Rock & Metal Albums (Official Charts)	2
US Billboard 200	64
US Top Alternative Albums (Billboard)	8
US Top Hard Rock Albums (Billboard)	2
US Top Rock Albums (Billboard)	11
