= The Illusion of Progress =

Studio album by Staind
- Released: August 19, 2008
- Recorded: 2007–2008
- Studios: Home Studio of frontman Aaron Lewis at The Barn, Massachusetts; Mardi Gras Studios, Massachusetts; Groovemaster Studios, Illinois
- Genres: Post-grunge; alternative rock
- Length: 56:54
- Labels: Flip; Atlantic; Roadrunner
- Producers: Johnny K; Staind

Staind chronology
The Singles: 1996–2006 (2006)	The Illusion of Progress (2008)	Staind (2011)

Singles from The Illusion of Progress
- 1. "Believe" Released: June 16, 2008; 2. "All I Want" Released: November 8, 2008; 3. "The Way I Am" Released: January 10, 2009; 4. "This Is It" Released: May 4, 2009

Professional ratings
Aggregate scores
Source	Rating
Metacritic	53/100
Review scores
Source	Rating
AllMusic	3/5 stars
Billboard	(positive)
The Boston Globe	(favorable)
Los Angeles Times	2/4 stars
Q	2/5 stars
Rolling Stone	2.5/5 stars

The Illusion of Progress is the sixth studio album by American rock band Staind. It was released on August 19, 2008. The Illusion of Progress was produced by Johnny K and recorded in lead singer Aaron Lewis's home studio. It debuted at No. 3 in the Billboard 200 with 91,800 units sold.

The lead single "Believe" topped the Alternative Songs chart on September 13, 2008. It accumulated three weeks at number one. The second single was "All I Want", and was released on November 24. The video continued the story of the first single video and was available on Staind's Myspace on December 12. In Europe the second single was "The Way I Am", and its video was available on the official Staind website as of December 24. "This Is It" was later released as the last single off the album. The album has sold over 318,000 units in the United States alone.

Lewis recorded a country version of the album’s ninth track "Tangled Up in You" on his 2011 solo EP Town Line.

== Sound ==
Lewis commented, "We went into the studio with the mindset of making our heaviest record yet, but the record that came out has flavors of Pink Floyd and straight-up blues. We didn't use the same rigs that we use onstage; we used all vintage guitars and amps, and I'm pretty psyched about it. The songs are pretty timeless in their texture." The band calls the new project the "most musical CD" they've recorded to date.

== Promotion ==
To promote the album, Staind treated their fans to a series of intimate, behind-the-scenes "webisodes" posted on staind.com, documenting their recording process. Staind also premiered the song "Believe" worldwide on U.S. station KYSR in Los Angeles. Staind also released the song, "This Is It", on iTunes early as a single. "This Is It" was released as a downloadable track for the video game Rock Band on July 29 for the Xbox 360 and July 31 for PlayStation 3. "This Is It" was also featured on the soundtrack for the 2009 film Transformers: Revenge of the Fallen.

== Reception ==
Initial critical response ranged from mixed to average. At Metacritic, which assigns a normalized rating out of 100 to reviews from mainstream critics, the album has received an average score of 53, based on 8 reviews.

== Track listing ==
All lyrics are written by Aaron Lewis, except "Raining Again", written by Lewis and Johnny K; all music is composed by Staind, except "Lost Along the Way" and "Tangled Up in You", composed by Lewis.

No.	Title	Length
1.	"This Is It"	3:43
2.	"The Way I Am"	4:18
3.	"Believe"	4:17
4.	"Save Me"	4:52
5.	"All I Want"	3:30
6.	"Pardon Me"	5:02
7.	"Lost Along the Way"	4:20
8.	"Break Away"	4:10
9.	"Tangled Up in You"	4:35
10.	"Raining Again"	3:53
11.	"Rainy Day Parade"	4:17
12.	"The Corner"	5:17
13.	"Nothing Left to Say"	4:40
Total length:		56:54

Limited Fan Club Edition
No.	Title	Length
14.	"It's Been Awhile" (live at the Hiro Ballroom)	4:49
15.	"Devil" (live at the Hiro Ballroom)	5:18
16.	"Schizophrenic Conversations" (live at the Hiro Ballroom)	4:46

- Note: All other editions with bonus tracks only contain "It's Been A While (Acoustic At The Hiro Ballroom)" and "Schizophrenic Conversations (Acoustic At The Hiro Ballroom)".

Japan Edition
No.	Title	Length
14.	"Something Like Me"	4:52
15.	"The Truth"	4:42

- Note: The Japanese edition of The Illusion of Progress lists the two bonus tracks "Something Like Me" and "The Truth" as both recorded live at the Hiro Ballroom. This is incorrect. They are actually the studio versions recorded during the Chapter V album sessions.

Apple Music Deluxe Edition
No.	Title	Length
14.	"The Truth"	4:42
15.	"Believe" (Music Video)	4:15

- Note: "Something Like Me" offered as an iTunes exclusive pre-order.

== Personnel ==
Credits taken from album's liner notes.

=== Staind ===
- Aaron Lewis – lead vocals, rhythm guitar
- Mike Mushok – lead guitar
- Johnny April – bass, backing vocals
- Jon Wysocki – drums

=== Additional musicians ===
- John Pirruccello – pedal steel guitar (tracks 9 and 12)
- Johnny K – piano (track 4), Hammond organ (tracks 9 and 12)
- Rick Barnes – slide guitar (track 9)
- Stevie Blacke – orchestration (track 9)
- Vernard Burton, Emoni Wilkins, Sharlisa Brooks, Zita Smith, Lajuanese Robertson, and Carya Holmes-Brown – additional vocals (track 12)

=== Production ===
- Johnny K – producer and engineer
- Tony "Tadpole" Mysliwiec – digital editing
- Justin Wilk – additional editing
- Jeff Gilmer – assistant engineer
- Ryan Williams – mixing
- Ted Jensen – mastering

== Charts ==
=== Weekly charts ===
Weekly chart performance for The Illusion of Progress
Chart (2008)	Peak position
Australian Albums (ARIA)	100
Austrian Albums (Ö3 Austria)	67
Canadian Albums (Billboard)	15
Dutch Albums (Album Top 100)	90
French Albums (SNEP)	180
German Albums (Offizielle Top 100)	41
New Zealand Albums (RMNZ)	22
Scottish Albums (Official Charts)	91
UK Albums (Official Charts)	73
US Billboard 200	3
US Top Rock Albums (Billboard)	2

=== Year-end charts ===
Year-end chart performance for The Illusion of Progress
Chart (2008)	Position
US Billboard 200	159
US Top Hard Rock Albums (Billboard)	20
