= This Is It (Staind song) =

Single by Staind

from the album The Illusion of Progress
- Released: May 4, 2009
- Genre: Alternative metal
- Length: 3:43
- Label: Flip; Atlantic; Roadrunner
- Songwriters: Aaron Lewis; Mike Mushok; Johnny April; Jon Wysocki
- Producer: Johnny K

Staind singles chronology
"The Way I Am" (2009)	"This Is It" (2009)	"Not Again" (2011)

"This Is It" is a song by the American rock band Staind. It served as the fourth and final single from the band's sixth studio album The Illusion of Progress. The song was released on May 4, 2009. It is featured on the soundtrack for the 2009 film Transformers: Revenge of the Fallen.

== Track listing ==
Digital single
No.	Title	Length
1.	"This Is It"	3:43

== Charts ==
Chart (2009)	Peak position
US Alternative Airplay (Billboard)	38
US Mainstream Rock (Billboard)	27
