= King of All Excuses =

Single by Staind

from the album Chapter V
- Released: June 20, 2006
- Recorded: 2005
- Genre: Alternative metal
- Length: 4:05
- Label: Elektra
- Songwriters: Aaron Lewis; Mike Mushok; Johnny April; Jon Wysocki
- Producer: Staind

Staind singles chronology
"Everything Changes" (2006)	"King of All Excuses" (2006)	"Believe" (2008)

"King of All Excuses" is the fourth and final single to be released from American rock band Staind's fifth studio album Chapter V.

== Chart performance ==
Chart (2006)	Peak position
US Mainstream Rock (Billboard)	27
