= How About You (Staind song) =

2003 single by Staind

Single by Staind

from the album 14 Shades of Grey
- Released: November 3, 2003
- Length: 3:57
- Label: Elektra; Flip
- Songwriters: Aaron Lewis; Mike Mushok; Johnny April; Jon Wysocki
- Producer: Josh Abraham

Staind singles chronology
"So Far Away" (2003)	"How About You" (2003)	"Zoe Jane" (2003)

Music video
- "How About You" on YouTube

"How About You" is a song by American rock band Staind. It was released on November 3, 2003, as the third single from the band's fourth studio album, 14 Shades of Grey (2003). The song reached No. 10 on both the US Billboard Modern Rock Tracks and Mainstream Rock Tracks charts.

== Charts ==
=== Weekly charts ===
Weekly chart performance for "How About You"
Chart (2004)	Peak position
US Bubbling Under Hot 100 (Billboard)	19
US Alternative Airplay (Billboard)	10
US Mainstream Rock (Billboard)	10

=== Year-end charts ===
Year-end chart performance for "How About You"
Chart (2004)	Position
US Mainstream Rock Tracks (Billboard)	37
US Modern Rock Tracks (Billboard)	51
