= Everything Changes (Staind song) =

Single by Staind

from the album Chapter V
- Released: March 7, 2006
- Genre: Alternative rock; post-grunge
- Length: 4:00
- Songwriters: Aaron Lewis; Mike Mushok; Johnny April; Jon Wysocki
- Producer: David Bottrill

Staind singles chronology
"Falling" (2005)	"Everything Changes" (2006)	"King of All Excuses" (2006)

Music video
- "Everything Changes" on YouTube

"Everything Changes" is a song by the American rock band Staind, which was the third single off of their album Chapter V.

== Composition ==
Staind's lead singer Aaron Lewis told MTV that "Everything Changes" was created after brainstorming some ideas and was one of the last songs recorded for Chapter V.

== Reception ==
"Everything Changes" received both positive and negative reviews. The Washington Post complimented Staind for creating a "concert-ready soft serve tune", and likened "Everything Changes" to Creed's song style. On the other hand, Billboard Magazine criticized Staind for making a song that did not expand on the band's ability to become "fierce rockers and sensitive balladers".

== Music video ==
In an outline by director Mike Sloat, Sloat detailed that the planned music video for "Everything Changes" would use clips from the 1993 film Dazed and Confused and Almost Famous. When the music video was released in June 2006, guitarist Mike Mushok explained that the video for "Everything Changes" was about finishing high school and the changes that would come after graduation.

=== Criticism ===
In a follow-up MTV interview, Aaron Lewis highlighted that he rarely saw the music video for "Everything Changes" aired on TV. Due to the lack of airplay for the music video, Lewis told MTV "I think nobody cares [about Staind] anymore. No one wants to see videos from us anymore. We're not the hip flavor of the moment".

== Charts ==
Chart (2006)	Peak position
US Adult Pop Airplay (Billboard)	33
US Alternative Airplay (Billboard)	32
US Mainstream Rock (Billboard)	22

== Release history ==
Release dates and formats for "Everything Changes"
Region	Date	Format	Label(s)	Ref.
United States	14 August 2006	Mainstream airplay	Atlantic	
