= Chapter V (Staind album) =

Studio album by Staind
- Released: August 9, 2005
- Recorded: June 2004 – March 2005
- Studios: Allaire Studios (Shokan, New York); Mardi Gras Studio (Springfield, Massachusetts)
- Genres: Post-grunge; nu metal; alternative metal
- Length: 50:35
- Labels: Flip; Atlantic
- Producers: David Bottrill; Staind

Staind chronology
14 Shades of Grey (2003)	Chapter V (2005)	The Singles: 1996–2006 (2006)

Singles from Chapter V
- 1. "Right Here" Released: June 4, 2005; 2. "Schizophrenic Conversations" Released: July 10, 2005; 3. "Falling" Released: October 18, 2005; 4. "Everything Changes" Released: March 7, 2006; 5. "King of All Excuses" Released: June 20, 2006

Chapter V is the fifth studio album by American rock band Staind. It was released on August 9, 2005, and debuted at number one on the US Billboard 200 with first week sales of 185,000 copies, and spawned a hit single along with three moderately successful singles on rock radio. Its first single "Right Here" was the most successful at both rock and pop stations and it was used in a video package by World Wrestling Entertainment commemorating the professional wrestler known as Edge after he won his first WWE Championship. "Falling" and "Everything Changes" have also been released with accompanying videos.

Lead singer Aaron Lewis has stated that he thinks "Chapter V is the best record the band has released to date", and the album continues the evolution from the messages on 14 Shades of Grey to messages of hope and uncertainty. It also showcases a heavier side to the band on selected tracks (reminiscent of some content on Dysfunction), and emphasizes a balance between both styles of the band's sound. The album includes a track called "Paper Jesus" targeted at record company executives who idolize money instead of music and "Reply", an open letter replying to fan mail that Aaron Lewis and the rest of the band have received over the years (the original version can be found on the Special Edition).

Since its release, it has sold 1,200,000 copies in the United States and 1,500,000 worldwide. However, it marked Staind's lowest debut so far in the UK, at number 112. All the same, it was regarded as one of the most anticipated albums of the year in the U.S. before its release. A special edition, with five bonus tracks, an extra booklet, and a DVD was released several months later. Even after a full year, it remained fairly consistent on the Billboard 200. Aaron Lewis has said in relation to this in the booklet of the Special Edition of the album: "Having three straight number one albums was a nice big screw you to a lot of people who have slagged us. Nobody can ever take away that fact."

Staind have promoted the album by allowing selected fans to preview it on their tour bus, and touring after its release for a whole year, including mini tours to Australia and solo tours across Europe, as well as the famous Fall Brawl Tour with Flyleaf, Taproot and P.O.D. The band have also toured with 3 Doors Down, Hurt, Three Days Grace, Breaking Benjamin, and Seether (later cancelled) across the United States to promote the album.

== Critical reception ==
Professional ratings
Aggregate scores
Source	Rating
Metacritic	48/100
Review scores
Source	Rating
AllMusic	3/5 stars
Billboard	(mixed)
Blender	3/5 stars
Entertainment Weekly	B
The Guardian	2/5 stars
musicOMH	2/5 stars
NME	3/10
Rolling Stone	2/5 stars
USA Today	1/4 stars

At Metacritic, the album received an average score of 48, based on 10 reviews, indicating "mixed or average reviews".

== Track listing ==
All lyrics are written by Aaron Lewis; all music is composed by Staind, except "Everything Changes" and "Reply", composed by Lewis.

No.	Title	Length
1.	"Run Away"	3:39
2.	"Right Here"	4:13
3.	"Paper Jesus"	4:14
4.	"Schizophrenic Conversations"	4:32
5.	"Falling"	4:20
6.	"Cross to Bear"	3:40
7.	"Devil"	5:00
8.	"Please"	4:24
9.	"Everything Changes"	3:58
10.	"Take This"	4:42
11.	"King of All Excuses"	3:39
12.	"Reply"	4:14
Total length:		50:35

Japanese edition
No.	Title	Length
13.	"Open Wide"	4:03

Limited edition bonus tracks
No.	Title	Length
13.	"Let It Out"	4:55
14.	"Novocaine"	3:15
15.	"Reply" (original version)	5:02
16.	"It's Been Awhile" (acoustic)	4:30
17.	"This Is Beetle" a.k.a. "The Beetlejuice Song"	3:15

B-sides
No.	Title	Length
14.	"Something Like Me"	4:52
15.	"The Truth"	4:42

== Personnel ==
- Aaron Lewis – lead vocals, rhythm guitar
- Mike Mushok – lead guitar, acoustic guitar on "Right Here"
- Johnny April – bass, backing vocals
- Jon Wysocki – drums

Production

- David Bottrill – producer, mixing
- Brian Sperber – audio engineering
- Bob Ludwig – mastering
- Jordan Schur – executive producer

== Charts ==
=== Weekly charts ===
Weekly chart performance for Chapter V
Chart (2005)	Peak position
Australian Albums (ARIA)	79
Austrian Albums (Ö3 Austria)	43
German Albums (Offizielle Top 100)	37
Italian Albums (FIMI)	59
New Zealand Albums (RMNZ)	14
Swedish Albums (Sverigetopplistan)	51
Swiss Albums (Schweizer Hitparade)	24
UK Albums (OCC)	112
US Billboard 200	1

=== Year-end charts ===
2005 year-end chart performance for Chapter V
Chart (2005)	Position
US Billboard 200	122

2006 year-end chart performance for Chapter V
Chart (2006)	Position
US Billboard 200	180

== Certifications ==
Certifications for Chapter V
Region	Certification	Certified units/sales
United States (RIAA)	Platinum	1,000,000^{^}
^{^} Shipments figures based on certification alone.
