= For You (Staind song) =

2001 single by Staind

Single by Staind

from the album Break the Cycle
- B-side: "Suffer" (live)
- Released: December 19, 2001
- Length: 3:26
- Label: Flip; Elektra
- Songwriters: Aaron Lewis; Mike Mushok; Johnny April; Jon Wysocki
- Producer: Josh Abraham

Staind singles chronology
"Fade" (2001)	"For You" (2001)	"Epiphany" (2002)

Music video
- "For You" on YouTube

"For You" is a song by American rock band Staind from their third studio album, Break the Cycle (2001), released as the album's fourth single in December 2001. The song is also included on Staind's greatest hits-type compilation album The Singles: 1996–2006. It became the third single from Break the Cycle to chart on the US Billboard Hot 100, peaking at number 63. It also charted on the Modern Rock Tracks and Mainstream Rock Tracks charts, reaching number three on both rankings.

== Music video ==
The video for the song was directed by Nigel Dick, it features an angry teenager looking to vent his frustration at his family while they drive towards a restaurant. The video is cut with shots of the band performing in a vacant building as the teen gradually begins screaming at his family.

== Track listing ==
UK CD single
No.	Title	Length
1.	"For You" (radio version)	3:25
2.	"For You" (album version)	3:25
3.	"Suffer" (live)	4:01
4.	"For You" (video)

== Charts ==
=== Weekly charts ===
Chart (2002)	Peak position
Scottish Singles Sales (Official Charts)	61
UK Singles (Official Charts)	55
UK Rock & Metal (Official Charts)	5
US Billboard Hot 100	63
US Alternative Airplay (Billboard)	3
US Mainstream Rock (Billboard)	3

=== Year-end charts ===
Chart (2002)	Position
US Mainstream Rock Tracks (Billboard)	3
US Modern Rock Tracks (Billboard)	6

== Release history ==
Region	Date	Format(s)	Label(s)	Ref.
United States	December 17, 2001	Modern rock radio	Flip; Elektra	
United Kingdom	February 11, 2001	CD; cassette	Flip; Elektra	
