= 14 Shades of Grey =

Studio album by Staind
- Released: May 20, 2003
- Recorded: September 2002 – March 2003
- Studio: Westlake Recording Studios (Los Angeles)
- Genres: Post-grunge; nu metal
- Length: 62:13
- Labels: Flip; Elektra
- Producer: Josh Abraham

Staind chronology
Break the Cycle (2001)	14 Shades of Grey (2003)	Chapter V (2005)

Singles from 14 Shades of Grey
- 1. "Price to Play" Released: April 7, 2003; 2. "So Far Away" Released: May 17, 2003; 3. "How About You" Released: November 3, 2003; 4. "Zoe Jane" Released: April 5, 2004

Professional ratings
Aggregate scores
Source	Rating
Metacritic	41/100
Review scores
Source	Rating
AllMusic	3/5 stars
Alternative Press	1/5 stars
Blender	3/5 stars
Dotmusic	2/10
E!	B
Entertainment Weekly	C
NOW	2/5 stars
Q	1.5/5 stars
Rolling Stone	2/5 stars
Uncut	2/10

14 Shades of Grey is the fourth studio album by American rock band Staind, released on May 20, 2003. The album continues the post-grunge sound as seen on the band's previous album Break the Cycle, but the songs on 14 Shades of Grey have fewer pop hooks, focusing more on frontman Aaron Lewis's emotions. It is the band's last album to be released from Elektra Records.

The album featured four singles and debuted at No. 1 on the Billboard 200, with first week sales of 220,000 copies. By July 2003, 14 Shades of Grey had been certified Gold then later Platinum.

== Background ==
After finishing their tour schedule, Staind allowed time for Lewis and his wife to conceive their first child and adjust to being parents for a few months. The band then took about five weeks to write new songs before they began recording in Los Angeles, including a week developing the songs at producer Josh Abraham's house. Guitarist Mike Mushok noted it as the first time Staind has actually written in the studio.

In January 2003, Staind planned on a May 6 release date for their untitled fourth album. This date persisted into March during which an album title was announced. However, this would have to be delayed a few weeks.

Aaron Lewis elaborated on the lighter direction of 14 Shades of Grey:

It's kind of a logical progression where we're getting older now. . . [Guitarist] Mike [Mushok] is married, and I'm married now with a kid and we're that much deeper into figuring out as far as lyrically goes and figuring out our trades as far as writing songs go.

Guitarist Mike Mushok described the album title, which refers to the number of tracks on the standard edition, in a 2003 interview:

I think it's kind of referring to how in life there's black and white and then there's this grey area. . . I think the older you get you start to realize that more things are grey and not so much black and white.

The song "Layne" is a tribute to then-recently deceased Alice in Chains frontman Layne Staley, while "Zoe Jane" honors Aaron Lewis' firstborn daughter. Some shots of Zoe Jane are featured in the video for "So Far Away".

== Release ==
First editions of the album included a limited edition bonus DVD featuring home videos and footage of the band from their early years to the present, along with album lyrics and new band photos. For a time, fans could use the CD to download a bonus acoustic song "Let it Out" from the Staind website, but the page was later removed. The song was later included on the deluxe edition of the band's next album, Chapter V.

A DVD-Audio edition of the album was also released, featuring a 5.1 surround sound version of the album, at high resolution (96 kHz/24-bit).

== Touring and promotion ==
The single "Price to Play" was released in early anticipation of the album's debut. Three more singles were released over the next several months with accompanying music videos.

Staind supported 14 Shades of Grey with a series of in-store appearances followed by free club performances. They also performed with Label mates Cold during the summer of 2003. Concert setlists incorporated songs from the band's previous two albums.

== Reception ==
The album received mainly mixed reviews from critics. At Metacritic, which assigns a normalized rating out of 100 to reviews from mainstream critics, the album has received an average score of 41, based on 10 reviews.

== Track listing ==
All lyrics are written by Aaron Lewis; all music is composed by Staind.

No.	Title	Length
1.	"Price to Play"	3:35
2.	"How About You"	3:57
3.	"So Far Away"	4:04
4.	"Yesterday"	3:46
5.	"Fray"	5:04
6.	"Zoe Jane"	4:36
7.	"Fill Me Up"	4:24
8.	"Layne"	4:25
9.	"Falling Down"	3:55
10.	"Reality"	4:37
11.	"Tonight"	4:24
12.	"Could It Be"	4:43
13.	"Blow Away"	6:14
14.	"Intro"	4:28
Total length:		62:13

Japanese edition bonus track
No.	Title	Length
15.	"Let It Out"	4:55
Total length:		66:06

B-sides
No.	Title	Length
16.	"Novocaine" (previously unreleased)	3:15

== Personnel ==
Staind

- Aaron Lewis – lead vocals, rhythm guitar, acoustic guitar
- Mike Mushok – lead guitar
- Johnny April – bass, backing vocals
- Jon Wysocki – drums

Additional musicians

- Josh Abraham – keyboards (tracks 4, 14), programming (track 4), string arrangements
- David Khane – string arrangements
- Tony Reyes – keyboards (tracks 6, 7, 14)
- Anthony Valcic – keyboards and programming (track 4)

Production

- Executive producer: Jordan Schur
- Produced by Josh Abraham
- Engineered by Ryan Williams; assisted by Brandon Belsky, Jones G., Scott Gutierrez, Joey Paradise, Jeff Phillips, Mark Valentine and Darren Venditti
- Additional recording by Anthony Valcic; third engineer: Jon Berkowitz
- Mixed by Andy Wallace; assisted by Steve Sisco
- Digital editing by Josh Wilbur

Design

- Artist coordination: Cailan McCarthy
- Art direction/design: Gregory Gigendad Burke
- Photography by Anthony Mandlet

== Charts ==
=== Weekly charts ===
Weekly chart performance for 14 Shades of Grey
Chart (2003)	Peak position
Australian Albums (ARIA)	35
Austrian Albums (Ö3 Austria)	32
Canadian Albums (Billboard)	8
Dutch Albums (Album Top 100)	78
French Albums (SNEP)	57
German Albums (Offizielle Top 100)	17
Irish Albums (IRMA)	24
Italian Albums (FIMI)	27
New Zealand Albums (RMNZ)	26
Scottish Albums (Official Charts)	11
Swedish Albums (Sverigetopplistan)	30
Swiss Albums (Schweizer Hitparade)	16
UK Albums (Official Charts)	16
US Billboard 200	1

=== Year-end charts ===
Year-end chart performance for 14 Shades of Grey
Chart (2003)	Position
US Billboard 200	64

== Certifications ==
Certifications for 14 Shades of Grey
Region	Certification	Certified units/sales
Canada (Music Canada)	Gold	50,000^{^}
United States (RIAA)	Platinum	1,000,000^{^}
^{^} Shipments figures based on certification alone.
