= Price to Play =

2003 single by Staind

Single by Staind

from the album 14 Shades of Grey
- B-side: 1. "Let It Out"; 2. "Can't Believe" (live)
- Released: April 7, 2003
- Length: 3:35
- Label: Elektra; Flip
- Songwriters: Aaron Lewis; Mike Mushok; Johnny April; Jon Wysocki
- Producer: Josh Abraham

Staind singles chronology
"Epiphany" (2002)	"Price to Play" (2003)	"So Far Away" (2003)

Music video
- "Price to Play" on YouTube

"Price to Play" is a song by American rock band Staind. It was released as the lead single from their fourth album, 14 Shades of Grey, on April 7, 2003. "Price to Play" was released in advance of the album and became a hit on US rock radio, charting at number two on the Billboard Mainstream Rock Tracks chart and number six on the Billboard Modern Rock Tracks chart. It served as the official theme song of WWE's Vengeance 2003 event.

== Themes and composition ==
Frontman Aaron Lewis explained that the song was the last song written and recorded for the 14 Shades of Grey album, and the lyrics initially were influenced from his frustrations that the band was so close to done with finishing the album. He explained:

Lyrically, what started the song was my frustrations with having to be back in the studio writing more songs and feeling like we were underneath somebody's thumb, but it turned into a song that just applies to life in general. And it's kind of tongue-in-cheek because life isn't a game, but it's the price we pay to play this game that we call life.

Similarly, Lewis stated the song was about the physical and mental toll of working in the music industry. While 14 Shades of Grey was less heavy than previous Staind albums at that time, "Price to Play" retained Staind's heavier and more aggressive sound, with heavy guitars in the verses, soaring vocal harmonies, and melody/harmony guitars to complement the vocals.

== Track listing ==
1. "Price to Play"
2. "Let It Out"
3. "Can't Believe" (live version from MTV Unplugged)

== Charts ==
=== Weekly charts ===
Weekly chart performance for "Price to Play"
Chart (2003)	Peak position
Australia (ARIA)	66
Ireland (IRMA)	41
Scotland Singles (Official Charts)	32
UK Singles (Official Charts)	36
UK Rock & Metal (Official Charts)	4
US Billboard Hot 100	66
US Alternative Airplay (Billboard)	6
US Mainstream Rock (Billboard)	2

=== Year-end charts ===
Year-end chart performance for "Price to Play"
Chart (2003)	Position
US Mainstream Rock Tracks (Billboard)	28
US Modern Rock Tracks (Billboard)	35

== Release history ==
Release dates and formats for "Price to Play"
Region	Date	Format(s)	Label(s)	Ref.
United States	April 7, 2003	Mainstream rock; active rock; alternative radio	Elektra; Flip	
United Kingdom	May 12, 2003	7-inch vinyl; CD	Elektra; Flip	
Australia	May 19, 2003	CD	Elektra; Flip	
