= Right Here (Staind song) =

Single by Staind

from the album Chapter V
- Released: June 7, 2005
- Recorded: 2005
- Genre: Alternative rock
- Length: 4:13
- Label: Flip
- Songwriters: Aaron Lewis; Mike Mushok; Johnny April; Jon Wysocki
- Producers: David Bottrill; Staind

Staind singles chronology
"Zoe Jane" (2004)	"Right Here" (2005)	"Falling" (2005)

Music video
- "Right Here" on YouTube

"Right Here is a song by the American rock band Staind. It was released through Flip Records on June 7, 2005, as the lead single from the band's fifth studio album, Chapter V (2005). The song peaked at number 55 on the Billboard Hot 100 and received significant rotation on rock radio in the United States. It topped Billboard's Hot Mainstream Rock Tracks chart for two weeks and peaked at number three on the same magazine's Hot Modern Rock Tracks chart. It also crossed over to pop radio, reaching the top 10 on both Adult Top 40 and Mainstream Top 40.

== Music video ==
The music video features all four members in one house in four separate rooms. Cameras capture all the members except Aaron Lewis in the same room playing their instruments, while Lewis is featured in multiple rooms.

== Track listing ==
1. "Right Here"
2. "Open Wide" (non-album track)
3. "Come Again" (demo)

== Charts ==
=== Weekly charts ===
Weekly chart performance for "Right Here"
Chart (2005–2006)	Peak position
Canada CHR/Pop Top 30 (Radio & Records)	27
Canada Rock Top 30 (Radio & Records)	6
US Billboard Hot 100	55
US Adult Contemporary (Billboard)	40
US Adult Pop Airplay (Billboard)	7
US Alternative Airplay (Billboard)	3
US Mainstream Rock (Billboard)	1
US Pop Airplay (Billboard)	9
US Pop 100 (Billboard)	19

=== Year-end charts ===
2005 year-end chart performance for "Right Here"
Chart (2005)	Position
US Mainstream Rock Tracks (Billboard)	6
US Modern Rock Tracks (Billboard)	8

2006 year-end chart performance for "Right Here"
Chart (2006)	Position
US Adult Top 40 (Billboard)	15

== Certifications ==
Certifications for "Right Here"
Region	Certification	Certified units/sales
United States (RIAA)	Gold	500,000^{^}
^{^} Shipments figures based on certification alone.
