= So Far Away (Staind song) =

2003 single by Staind

Single by Staind

from the album 14 Shades of Grey
- Released: June 23, 2003
- Genre: Post-grunge
- Length: 4:03
- Label: Elektra; Flip
- Songwriters: Aaron Lewis; Mike Mushok; Johnny April; Jon Wysocki
- Producer: Josh Abraham

Staind singles chronology
"Price to Play" (2003)	"So Far Away" (2003)	"How About You" (2003)

Music video
- "So Far Away" on YouTube

"So Far Away" is a song by the American rock band Staind, released to rock radio on June 23, 2003, as the second single from their fourth album, 14 Shades of Grey. The song found success on both rock and mainstream radio, reaching number one on the US Billboard Mainstream Rock Tracks chart for 14 consecutive weeks (one of the longest runs in the chart's history) and on the Billboard Modern Rock Tracks for seven non-consecutive weeks. It also became the band's second top-40 hit on the Billboard Hot 100, peaking at number 24.

In May 2021, for the 40th anniversary of Mainstream Rock Tracks chart, Billboard ranked "So Far Away" at number 20 on its list of the 100 most successful songs in the chart's history; in September 2023, the magazine ranked the song at number 89 on a similar retrospective list for the 35th anniversary of the Modern Rock Tracks chart (which by then had been renamed to Alternative Airplay).

== Reception ==
Bram Teitelman of Billboard reviewed the song favorably, predicting a rock radio smash due to "the lyrics' sunny disposition and a return to the sonic qualities that radio previously embraced." Teitelman called it a "midtempo song anchored by frontman Aaron Lewis' expressive vocals." Katherine Turman described the song as "an honest and grateful musing on success"; fans however feel that the song represents Aaron Lewis moving on in life and speaking of hope and uncertainty, along with the running theme of 14 Shades of Grey. The song was featured in the ninth episode of the third season of the series Smallville, and was used for a TV spot for the 2004 Marvel superhero film The Punisher. The song was also featured on twelfth episode of the fourth season of the TV series SEAL Team.

== Music video ==
The music video for the song was directed by Nigel Dick, and is a collage of clips of the band's live performances, some shots of Aaron Lewis' oldest daughter Zoe Jane (who was 1 at the time of filming), and other tour footage. It was filmed during a live performance at Freedom Hall in Louisville, Kentucky.

== Track listings ==
Australian release

1. "So Far Away" (radio edit)
2. "Novocaine"
3. "Zoe Jane" (live at KROQ)

UK release

1. "So Far Away" (radio edit)
2. "Mudshovel" (live)
3. "Home-Grown Promo Footage" (multimedia)

== Charts ==
=== Weekly charts ===
Weekly chart performance for "So Far Away"
Chart (2003–2004)	Peak position
US Billboard Hot 100	24
US Adult Pop Airplay (Billboard)	16
US Alternative Airplay (Billboard)	1
US Mainstream Rock (Billboard)	1
US Pop Airplay (Billboard)	17

=== Year-end charts ===
2003 year-end chart performance for "So Far Away"
Chart (2003)	Position
US Adult Top 40 (Billboard)	61
US Mainstream Rock Tracks (Billboard)	6
US Modern Rock Tracks (Billboard)	11

2004 year-end chart performance for "So Far Away"
Chart (2004)	Position
US Adult Top 40 (Billboard)	51
US Mainstream Rock Tracks (Billboard)	25
US Mainstream Top 40 (Billboard)	78
US Modern Rock Tracks (Billboard)	74

=== Decade-end charts ===
Decade-end chart performance for "So Far Away"
Chart (2000–2009)	Position
US Hot Alternative Songs (Billboard)	14
US Hot Rock Songs (Billboard)	12

== Certifications ==
Certifications for "So Far Away"
Region	Certification	Certified units/sales
New Zealand (RMNZ)	Platinum	30,000^{‡}
^{‡} Sales+streaming figures based on certification alone.

== Release history ==
Release dates and formats for "So Far Away"
Region	Date	Format(s)	Label(s)	Ref(s).
United States	June 23, 2003	Mainstream rock; active rock; alternative radio	Elektra; Flip	
United States	July 28, 2003	Contemporary hit; hot adult contemporary radio	Elektra; Flip	
Australia	August 25, 2003	CD	Elektra; Flip	
United Kingdom	September 15, 2003	7-inch vinyl; CD; DVD	Elektra; Flip	
