= Outside (Staind song) =

2001 single by Staind

Promotional single by Aaron Lewis with Fred Durst
- Released: 2000
- Length: 5:44 (original version); 3:45 (radio edit)
- Label: Flawless; Geffen
- Songwriter: Aaron Lewis

Audio
- "Outside" on YouTube

"Outside"

Single by Staind

from the album Break the Cycle
- Released: 2001
- Genre: Nu metal
- Length: 4:51
- Label: Flip; Elektra
- Songwriter: Aaron Lewis
- Producer: Josh Abraham

Staind singles chronology
"It's Been Awhile" (2001)	"Outside" (2001)	"Fade" (2001)

Music video
- "Outside" on YouTube

"Outside" is a song by the American rock band Staind. The power ballad was originally recorded live during the 1999 Family Values Tour by lead vocalist Aaron Lewis with Limp Bizkit lead vocalist Fred Durst, becoming a hit on US rock radio in early 2001. A studio version was then released in May 2001 as the second single from Staind's third studio album, Break the Cycle, and charted internationally.

== Background ==
"Outside" was originally performed live during the 1999 Family Values Tour in Biloxi, Mississippi, with Aaron Lewis (vocals and guitar) on the stage by himself and Limp Bizkit's Fred Durst providing backing vocals. Lewis was asked to perform a song solo and he decided at the last moment to play a song he had been working on and practicing with an acoustic side project known as J-CAT since the early days of Staind. He finished the lyrics to "Outside" on the spot while singing the song live.

"It's really an accidental phenomenon," Lewis explains. "I've been playing it for quite some time. In the early days of the band, any money we made went back into the band, so two or three times a week I played acoustically to make money to live off. 'Outside' was one of the songs I played, but it wasn't really finished, so I made up different words every time. We almost put it on Dysfunction. Then, one night on the Family Values Tour, ten minutes before going onstage, we decided to do it. There was never any thought of releasing it this way."

The live acoustic version from the album The Family Values Tour 1999 was picked up by radio stations across the country and became a hit peaking number one on the US Mainstream Rock Tracks chart, number two on the Modern Rock Tracks chart, and number 56 on the Billboard Hot 100. In many ways, the buzz generated by the live version of "Outside" provided the perfect bridge between Staind's major label debut Dysfunction and their breakthrough follow up, Break the Cycle, introducing new fans to the band just a few months before Break the Cycle was released. "Outside" also showed a much softer side of Lewis and Staind that would be explored further in Break the Cycle.

The studio version managed to have moderate success due to the popularity of both the acoustic live performance and their breakthrough hit, "It's Been Awhile". The studio recorded version peaked number 11 on the US Mainstream Rock Tracks and number 16 on the Modern Rock Tracks charts but it failed to be a pop hit like the live acoustic version or "It's Been Awhile". The studio recorded version hit number 11 on the Bubbling Under Hot 100 Singles chart.

== Music video ==
There are two music videos for "Outside". A music video was released for the original live performance of the song which, on its release, had frequent play on MTV2.

The studio-recorded electric version of the song had a music video as well. It was directed by Nigel Dick and was filmed at the Paramount Hotel (then known as the Hippodrome) in October 2001. This video also features Mike Smith, who played guitar in the band Limp Bizkit from 2002 to 2004, and now plays guitar and sings in the band Shedding Light (previously known as Evolver). The music video features Staind performing the song to an audience that sings along to the lyrics; all the while, a young man outside of a wall sees the performance through a hole and attempts different ways to enter (e.g., digging a hole). After the young man makes a pile out of rocks and climbs over the wall, he finds himself still on the outside; defeated, he slumps on the ground and lip-syncs to the final lyrics of the song as it ends.

== Charts ==
=== Aaron Lewis with Fred Durst version ===
==== Weekly charts ====
Chart (2001)	Peak position
Europe (Eurochart Hot 100)	99
US Billboard Hot 100	56
US Adult Pop Airplay (Billboard)	31
US Alternative Airplay (Billboard)	2
US Mainstream Rock (Billboard)	1

==== Year-end charts ====
Chart (2001)	Position
US Adult Top 40 (Billboard)	89
US Mainstream Rock Tracks (Billboard)	13
US Modern Rock Tracks (Billboard)	15

=== Staind studio version ===
==== Weekly charts ====
Chart (2001–2002)	Peak position
Australia (ARIA)	88
Austria (Ö3 Austria Top 40)	69
Belgium (Ultratip Bubbling Under Flanders)	4
Germany (GfK)	73
Netherlands (Single Top 100)	71
Scottish Singles Sales (Official Charts)	24
Sweden (Sverigetopplistan)	52
Switzerland (Schweizer Hitparade)	53
UK Singles (Official Charts)	33
UK Rock & Metal (Official Charts)	2
US Bubbling Under Hot 100 (Billboard)	11
US Mainstream Rock (Billboard)	11
US Alternative Airplay (Billboard)	16

==== Year-end charts ====
Chart (2001)	Position
US Mainstream Rock Tracks (Billboard)	26
US Modern Rock Tracks (Billboard)	37

== Certifications ==
Region	Certification	Certified units/sales
New Zealand (RMNZ)	Gold	15,000^{‡}
United Kingdom (BPI)	Silver	200,000^{‡}
^{‡} Sales+streaming figures based on certification alone.

== Release history ==
Region	Version	Date	Format(s)	Label(s)	Ref.
United States	Aaron Lewis with Fred Durst	2000	Rock radio	Flawless; Geffen	
United States	Staind	2001	Rock radio	Flip; Elektra	
United Kingdom	Staind	November 19, 2001	CD; cassette	Flip; Elektra	
Australia	Staind	February 25, 2002	CD	Flip; Elektra	
