= It's Been Awhile =

2001 single by Staind

Single by Staind

from the album Break the Cycle
- Released: March 27, 2001
- Genre: Post-grunge; nu metal
- Length: 4:25
- Label: Flip; Elektra
- Songwriters: Aaron Lewis; Mike Mushok; Johnny April; Jon Wysocki
- Producer: Josh Abraham

Staind singles chronology
"Home" (2000)	"It's Been Awhile" (2001)	"Outside" (2001)

Music video
- "It's Been Awhile" on YouTube

"It's Been Awhile" is a song by American rock band Staind, released on March 27, 2001, as the lead single from their third studio album, Break the Cycle (2001). The song is Staind's most successful, becoming a number-five hit on the US Billboard Hot 100 chart in October 2001. It spent a second-best 20 weeks at number one on the Billboard Mainstream Rock Tracks chart (behind "Loser" by 3 Doors Down) and a then-record 16 weeks at number one on the Billboard Modern Rock Tracks chart. It was certified eight-times platinum in their home country by the Recording Industry Association of America (RIAA). Worldwide, the single became a number-one airplay hit in Canada and entered the top 20 in Ireland, the Netherlands, New Zealand, and the United Kingdom.

== Background and composition ==
Aaron Lewis originally wrote this song around 1996 along with "Outside" slightly prior to the release of Dysfunction and performed it with a short-lived acoustic side project called J-CAT, before abruptly shelving it until 2000 during the recording sessions of Break the Cycle. Since its release, "It's Been Awhile" has been described as a post-grunge and nu metal song.

== Reception and legacy ==
"It's Been Awhile" is one of Staind's most well-known tracks, and has been cited as one of the best rock songs of the twenty-first century. Eric Aiese of Billboard reviewed the song favorably, saying that the group handles the ballad well and packs "a lot of punch into the cut." Aiese said that the song "may be the group's greatest splash yet."

== Music video ==
The music video was directed by Limp Bizkit frontman Fred Durst. It had its world premiere on MTV's Total Request Live program on April 13, 2001. The music video begins with Aaron Lewis going through some old photographs, one of which is a picture of his wife. The video switches between him writing a letter to his wife and the band performing in a room full of candles. There are brief shots of Lewis alone in the streets and looking at himself in the mirror while having second thoughts. Throughout the video, Lewis is seen smoking cigarettes. At the end of the video, one of those cigarettes falls onto the floor and burns down his apartment.

== Track listings ==
UK CD1

1. "It's Been Awhile" (clean edit) – 3:51
2. "Suffocate" – 3:17
3. "It's Been Awhile" (album version) – 4:25
4. "It's Been Awhile" (enhanced video)

UK CD2

1. "It's Been Awhile" (live version) – 4:40
2. "Spleen" – 4:40
3. "It's Been Awhile" (acoustic version) – 4:31

European CD single

1. "It's Been Awhile" (edit) – 3:56
2. "It's Been Awhile" (acoustic version) – 4:31

Australian maxi-CD single

1. "It's Been Awhile" (edit) – 3:56
2. "It's Been Awhile" (acoustic version) – 4:31
3. "Suffocate" – 3:17

== Charts ==
=== Weekly charts ===
Weekly chart performance for "It's Been Awhile"
Chart (2001–2002)	Peak position
Australia (ARIA)	24
Austria (Ö3 Austria Top 40)	54
Belgium (Ultratop 50 Flanders)	46
Canada Radio (Nielsen BDS)	1
Canada CHR (Nielsen BDS)	4
Europe (Eurochart Hot 100)	39
Germany (GfK)	43
Ireland (IRMA)	18
Netherlands (Dutch Top 40)	7
Netherlands (Single Top 100)	19
New Zealand (Recorded Music NZ)	13
Quebec Airplay (ADISQ)	1
Scottish Singles Sales (Official Charts)	12
Sweden (Sverigetopplistan)	23
Switzerland (Schweizer Hitparade)	79
UK Singles (Official Charts)	15
UK Rock & Metal (Official Charts)	1
US Billboard Hot 100	5
US Adult Alternative Airplay (Billboard)	9
US Adult Pop Airplay (Billboard)	6
US Alternative Airplay (Billboard)	1
US Mainstream Rock Airplay (Billboard)	1
US Pop Airplay (Billboard)	3
US Top 40 Tracks (Billboard)	4

=== Year-end charts ===
2001 year-end chart performance for "It's Been Awhile"
Chart (2001)	Position
Canada Radio (Nielsen BDS)	6
New Zealand (RIANZ)	50
US Billboard Hot 100	14
US Adult Top 40 (Billboard)	22
US Mainstream Rock Tracks (Billboard)	1
US Mainstream Top 40 (Billboard)	13
US Modern Rock Tracks (Billboard)	2
US Top 40 Tracks (Billboard)	23

2002 year-end chart performance for "It's Been Awhile"
Chart (2002)	Position
Canada Radio (Nielsen BDS)	80
US Adult Top 40 (Billboard)	28

=== Decade-end charts ===
Decade-end chart performance for "It's Been Awhile"
Chart (2000–2009)	Position
US Hot Rock Songs (Billboard)	6

== Certifications ==
Certifications and sales for "It's Been Awhile"
Region	Certification	Certified units/sales
Australia (ARIA)	Gold	35,000^{^}
New Zealand (RMNZ)	3× Platinum	90,000^{‡}
United Kingdom (BPI)	Gold	400,000^{‡}
United States (RIAA)	8× Platinum	8,000,000^{‡}
^{^} Shipments figures based on certification alone.^{‡} Sales+streaming figures based on certification alone.

== Release history ==
Release dates and formats for "It's Been Awhile"
Region	Date	Format(s)	Label(s)	Ref.
United States	March 27, 2001	Active rock; alternative radio	Flip; Elektra	
United States	May 22, 2001	Contemporary hit radio	Flip; Elektra	
Australia	June 18, 2001	CD	Flip; Elektra	
United Kingdom	September 3, 2001	CD; cassette	Flip; Elektra	
