= Staind =

American rock band

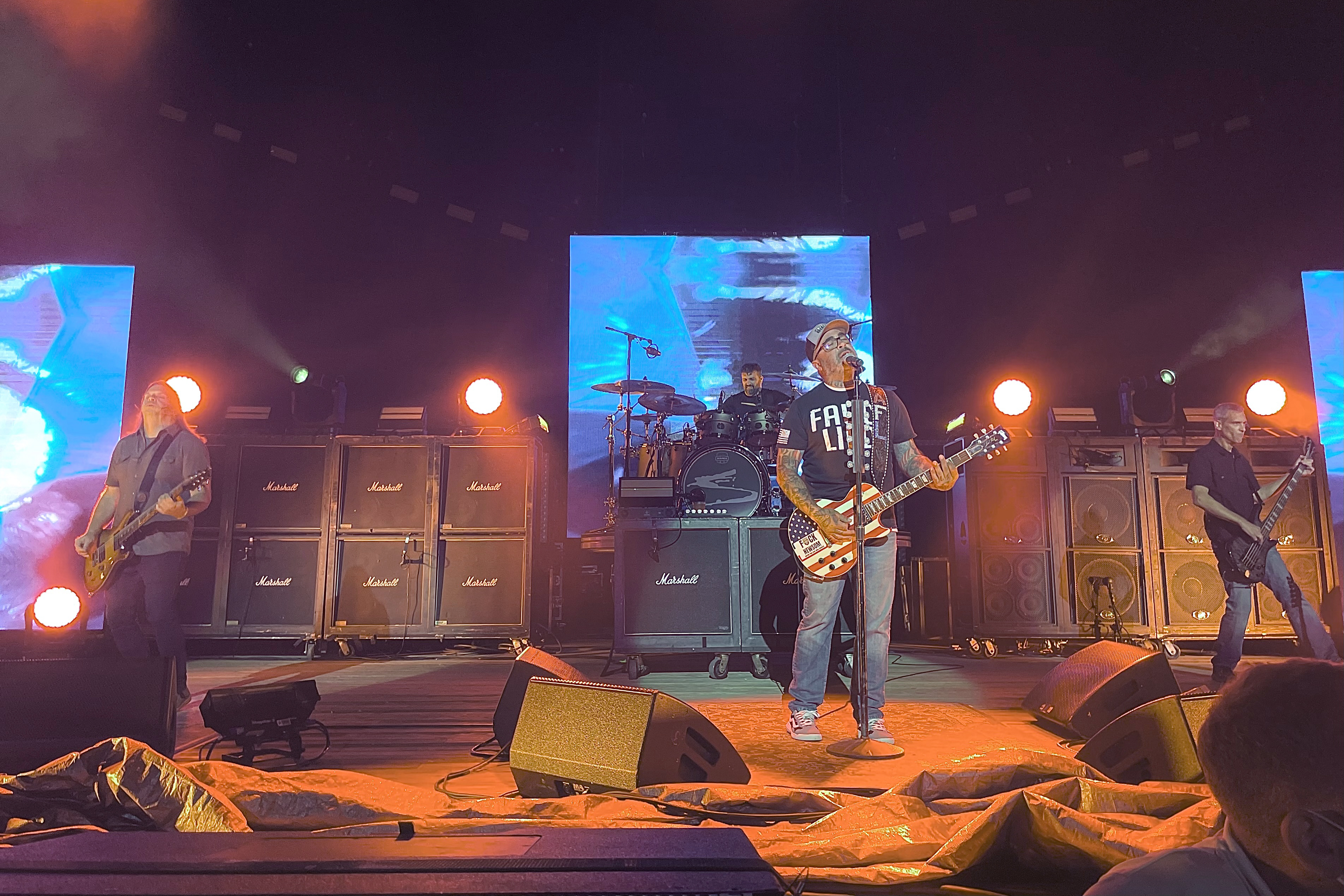
- Staind live at Jones Beach Theater in Wantagh, New York, in 2021

Background information
- Origin: Springfield, Massachusetts, U.S.
- Genres: Alternative metal; post-grunge; nu metal; hard rock
- Years active: 1995–2012; 2014; 2017; 2019–present
- Labels: Flip; Elektra; Atlantic; Roadrunner; BMG
- Members: Aaron Lewis; Mike Mushok; Johnny April; Sal Giancarelli
- Past members: Pete McEwan; Jon Wysocki
- Website: staindofficial.com

Staind (/steɪnd/ STAYND) is an American rock band from Springfield, Massachusetts, formed in 1995. The original lineup consisted of lead vocalist and rhythm guitarist Aaron Lewis, lead guitarist Mike Mushok, bassist and backing vocalist Johnny April, and drummer Jon Wysocki. The lineup has been stable outside of the 2011 departure of Wysocki, who was replaced by Sal Giancarelli. Staind has recorded and released eight studio albums: Tormented (1996), Dysfunction (1999), Break the Cycle (2001), 14 Shades of Grey (2003), Chapter V (2005), The Illusion of Progress (2008), Staind (2011) and Confessions of the Fallen (2023).

The band was most successful in the early 2000s, with Break the Cycle going five times platinum in the United States and producing a top-five Billboard Hot 100 hit with its lead single "It's Been Awhile". Break the Cycle, along with the band's following two full-length albums, also topped the Billboard 200, and the two after peaked within the top five. Several of their other singles also became rock and crossover hits, including "Fade", "For You", "Price to Play", "So Far Away", "Right Here", and "Believe". The band's activity became more sporadic into the 2010s, with Lewis pursuing a solo country music career and Mushok subsequently joining the band Saint Asonia.

Anne Erickson of WMMR called Staind "one of the defining bands of the post-grunge movement."

== History ==
=== Early years and Tormented (1995–1998) ===
In 1993, vocalist Aaron Lewis and guitarist Mike Mushok met at a Christmas party in Springfield, Massachusetts. Mushok introduced drummer Jon Wysocki while Lewis brought in bassist Johnny April to form the band in 1995. Their first public performance was in February 1995, playing a heavy, dark, and introspective style of metal. Extensive touring in the Northeast helped Staind acquire a regional following over the next few years.

The band started covering Korn, Rage Against the Machine, Pearl Jam, Tool, and Alice in Chains, among others, and played at local clubs (most commonly playing at Infinity, a live music venue located in Springfield) for a year and a half. Staind self-released their debut album, Tormented, in November 1996, citing Tool, Faith No More, and Pantera as their influences. In October 1997, Staind acquired a concert slot through Aaron's cousin Justin Cantor with Limp Bizkit. Just prior to the performance, Limp Bizkit frontman Fred Durst was appalled by Staind's grotesque album cover and unsuccessfully attempted to remove them from the bill. Durst thought that Staind were Theistic Satanists. After being persuaded to let them perform, however, Durst was so impressed that he signed them to Flip Records by February 1998.

The band participated in eight dates of the Vans Warped Tour in the summer of 1998, along with Bad Religion, Rancid, NOFX and Deftones.

=== Dysfunction (1999–2000) ===
On April 13, 1999, Staind released their major label debut Dysfunction on Flip Records. The album, which was co-produced by Fred Durst and Terry Date (who also produced acts like Soundgarden, Deftones, and Pantera), received comparisons to alternative metal giants Tool and Korn. In particular, Aaron Lewis was lauded for his vocals, which were likened to those of Pearl Jam's Eddie Vedder.

The album achieved slow success, reaching the No. 1 spot on Billboard's Heatseeker Charts almost six months after its debut. In the same week, the record jumped to No. 74 on Billboard's Top 200 Album Charts. The nine-track LP (with one hidden track, "Excess Baggage") produced three singles, "Just Go", "Mudshovel", and "Home". "Mudshovel" and "Home" both received radio play, cracking the Top 20 of Billboard's Modern Rock and Mainstream Rock charts. In promotion of Dysfunction, Staind went on several tours, including the Family Values Tour with acts like Limp Bizkit and The Crystal Method, as well as opening for Sevendust's headlining tour.

=== Break the Cycle (2001–2002) ===
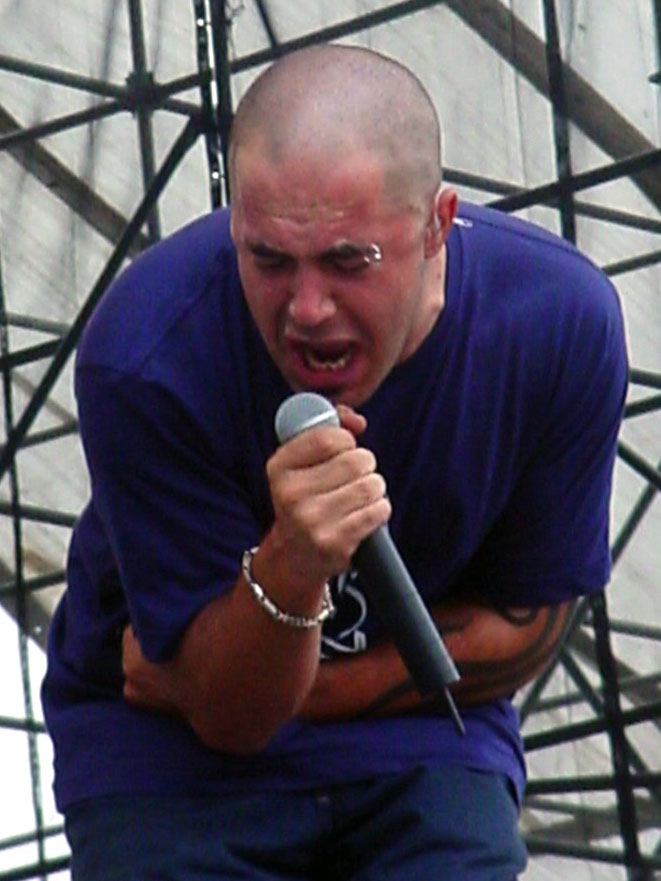
Aaron Lewis performing at the Rolling Rock Town Fair in August 2001

Staind toured with Limp Bizkit for the Family Values Tour during the fall of 1999, where Aaron Lewis performed an early version of "Outside" with Fred Durst at the Mississippi Coast Coliseum. Staind released their third studio album, Break the Cycle, on May 8, 2001. Propelled by the success of the first single, "It's Been Awhile", the album debuted at No. 1 on Billboard's Top 200 Album charts, selling 716,000 copies in its first week. The record's first-week sales were the second highest of any album that year, behind Creed's Weathered.

Break the Cycle saw the band retaining the nu metal sound from their previous album. Despite this, the album saw the band going further into a post-grunge sound which is evident in the smash hit song "It's Been Awhile", and the song led critics to compare the band to several other post-grunge bands at the time. The record spawned the singles "It's Been Awhile" (which hit the Billboard Top 10), "Fade", "Outside", "For You", and the acoustic ballad "Epiphany". "It's Been Awhile" spent a total of 16 and 14 weeks on top of the modern and mainstream rock charts respectively, making it one of the highest joint numbers of all time. In 2001, Break the Cycle sold four million copies worldwide, making it one of the best selling albums that year. Break the Cycle would go on to sell seven million copies worldwide, making this Staind's bestselling album.

=== 14 Shades of Grey (2003–2004) ===
In early 2003, Staind embarked on a worldwide tour to promote the release of the follow-up to Break the Cycle, 14 Shades of Grey, which sold two million copies and debuted at number 1 on the Billboard 200. The album saw a departure from their previous nu metal sound as it mostly contained a lighter and more melodic post-grunge sound. 14 Shades of Grey produced two mainstream hits, "Price to Play" and "So Far Away", which spent 14 weeks on top of the rock chart. In addition, two other singles were released: "How About You" and "Zoe Jane". The band's appearance at the Reading Festival during their 2003 tour had another impromptu acoustic set, this time due to equipment failure. The singles "So Far Away" and "Price to Play" came with two unreleased tracks, "Novocaine" and "Let It Out", which were released for the special edition of the group's subsequent album Chapter V, which came out in late 2005. In 2003, Staind unsuccessfully sued their logo designer Jon Stainbrook in New York Federal Court for attempting to re-use the logo he had sold to the band. They re-opened the case in mid-2005.

=== Chapter V and The Singles (2005–2007) ===
Staind's fifth album, titled Chapter V, was released on August 9, 2005, and became their third consecutive album to top the Billboard 200. The album opened to sales of 185,000 and has since been certified platinum in the U.S. The first single, "Right Here", was the biggest success from the album, garnering much mainstream radio play and peaking at number 1 on the mainstream rock chart. "Falling" was released as the second single, followed by "Everything Changes" and "King of All Excuses". Staind went on the road when the album came out, doing live shows and promoting it for a full year, including participating in the Fall Brawl tour with P.O.D., Taproot, and Flyleaf; they also had a solo tour across Europe and a mini-promotional tour in Australia for the first time. Other live shows included a cover of Pantera's "This Love", a tribute to Dimebag Darrell. Staind appeared on The Howard Stern Show on August 10, 2005 to promote Chapter V. They performed acoustic renditions of the single "Right Here" and Beetlejuice's song "This is Beetle". In early November 2005, Staind released the limited edition 2-CD/DVD set of Chapter V. On September 6, 2006, they performed an acoustic show in the Hiro Ballroom, New York City, that was recorded for their singles collection. The band played sixteen songs, including three covers: Tool's "Sober", Pink Floyd's "Comfortably Numb", and Alice in Chains's "Nutshell".

The collection The Singles: 1996–2006 was released on November 14, 2006. It included all the band's singles, the three covers performed at the New York show, and a remastered version of "Come Again" from Staind's first independent release Tormented.

=== The Illusion of Progress (2008–2009) ===
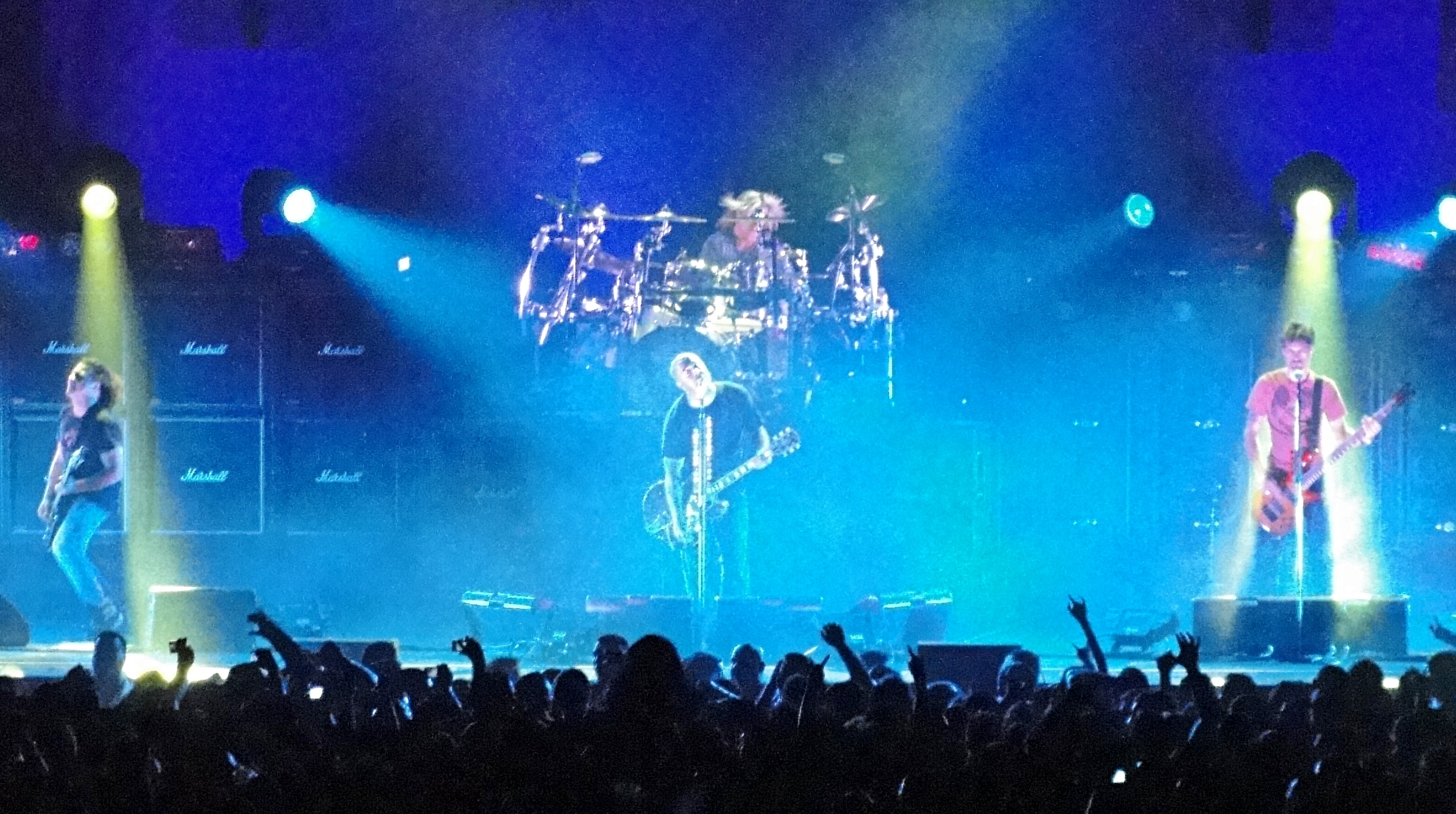
Staind performing in 2009

On August 19, 2008, Staind released their sixth album, The Illusion of Progress. Prior to the album's release, the track "This Is It" was available for download on the iTunes Store, as well as for Rock Band. The album debuted at No. 3 on the U.S. Billboard 200, No. 1 on the Top Modern Rock/Alternative Albums Chart, No. 1 on the Top Digital Albums Chart, and also No. 1 on the Top Internet Albums Chart, with first-week sales of 91,800 units. The first single on the album, "Believe", topped Billboard's Top 10 Modern Rock Tracks on September 5, 2008. The band also supported Nickelback on their 2008 European tour. The second single was "All I Want", and came out on November 24. The single also became Staind's 13th top 20 hit on the rock charts. In Europe, the second single was "The Way I Am", released on January 26, 2009. The final single released from the album, "This Is It", was sent to radio stations across the country on May 4, 2009. The track was also included on the successful Transformers: Revenge of the Fallen – The Album released in late June 2009. The same year, Staind embarked on a fall tour with the newly reunited Creed.

=== Staind and departure of Jon Wysocki (2010–2012) ===
In March 2010, Aaron Lewis stated the band would start working on their seventh studio album by the end of the year. Lewis had finished recording his country music solo EP and had started a nonprofit organization to reopen his daughter's elementary school in Worthington, Massachusetts. Guitarist Mike Mushok stated in a Q&A session with fans that the band was looking to make a heavy record, but still "explore some of the things we did on the last record and take them somewhere new for us". In a webisode posted on the band's website, Lewis stated that eight songs were written and that "every one of them is as heavy or heavier than the heaviest song on the last record". The band originally planned on recording with Nick Raskulinecz, but ended up working with The Illusion of Progress producer Johnny K, much to Wysocki's dismay.

In December 2010, Staind posted three webisodes from the studio, which featured the band members discussing the writing and recording process of their new album. They announced that as of April 20, they had completed the recording of their seventh and would release it later that year. Wysocki said that the album's production was rushed as the band had waited until the last minute—before they would be in breach of their record contract—to record the album. He later said that whilst "some [of the album's] songs came out pretty good", it was not as well-rounded as the band's previous efforts. Due to his frustration with the album's production and "distractions" afflicting the band, Wysocki decided to quit Staind. "I was very frustrated with it all, so I said to the guys, 'As much as I love this band and I love you guys, I gotta go. This is not the Staind we started out being.'" Staind announced Wysocki's departure on May 20, 2011. Following his departure, Wysocki joined Soil.

Drummer Will Hunt filled in for a few dates, while Wysocki's drum tech Sal Giancarelli filled in for the rest of the tour. On May 23, 2011, it was reported that Staind's new album would be a self-titled release. It was released on September 13, 2011. The first single, "Not Again", was released to active radio stations on July 18. The song "The Bottom" appeared on the Transformers: Dark of the Moon soundtrack. On June 30, Staind released a song called "Eyes Wide Open" from their new record. "Eyes Wide Open" would later be released on November 29 as the album's second single.

In November 2011, the band announced through their YouTube page that Sal Giancarelli was now an official member. The band continued to perform into 2012, embarking on an April and May tour with Godsmack and Halestorm, and they played the Uproar Festival in August and September with Shinedown and a number of other artists.

It was announced in July 2012 that the band was to be taking a hiatus. In an interview with Billboard, Aaron Lewis stated that "We're not breaking up. We're not gonna stop making music. We're just going to take a little hiatus that really hasn't ever been taken in our career. We put out seven records in 14 years. We've been pretty busy." Lewis also had plans to release his first solo album The Road. During this time, Mike Mushok auditioned, and was selected, to play guitar for former Metallica bassist Jason Newsted's new band Newsted. He featured on their debut album Heavy Metal Music.

=== Hiatus, Confessions of the Fallen and death of Jon Wysocki (2013–2025) ===
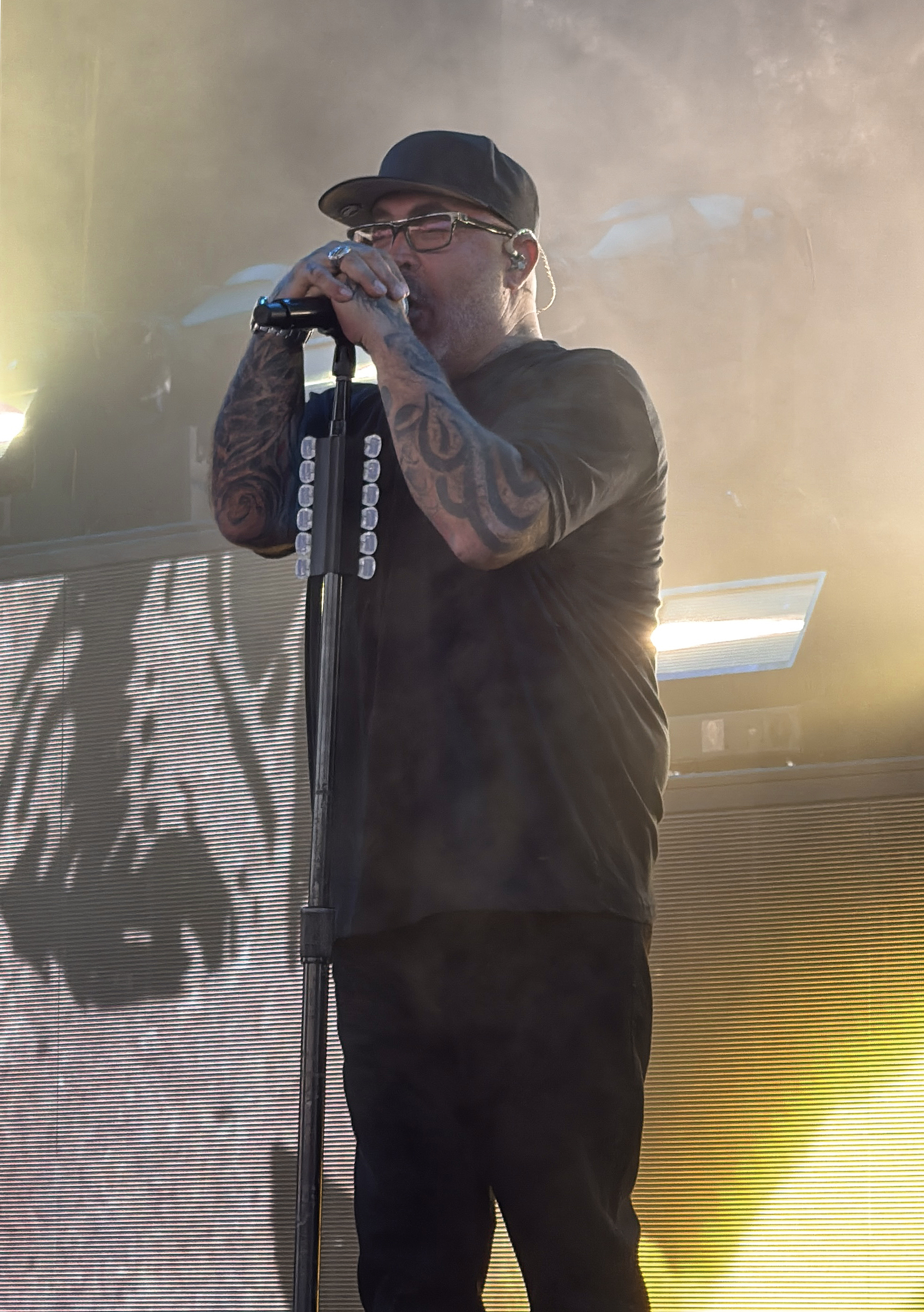
Aaron Lewis with Staind in 2025

Staind played their first show in two years at the Welcome to Rockville festival on April 27, 2014. They also played the Carolina Rebellion and Rock on the Range festivals in May 2014.

In late 2014, the band went on a hiatus. Aaron Lewis continued to play solo shows and work on his next solo album. He also confirmed that the hiatus would last "for a while". Mike Mushok teamed up with former Three Days Grace singer Adam Gontier, former Finger Eleven drummer Rich Beddoe, and Eye Empire bassist Corey Lowery to form Saint Asonia.

On August 4, 2017, the band performed for the first time since November 2014 for an acoustic performance at Aaron Lewis' 6th annual charity golf tournament and concert when bassist Johnny April and drummer Sal Giancarelli joined Aaron Lewis and Mike Mushok to perform "Outside", "Something to Remind You", and "It's Been Awhile". Three days later, Lewis announced that Staind would never tour extensively again, with Lewis explaining:

The touring machine, as you call it, of Staind will never be again. Not like that, no. Never. I could never go back to playing six shows [a week] eight weeks in a row. I can't do that. I have grown in my age and become very accustomed to playing Thursday, Friday and Saturday and being able to go home for a few days and unwind and try to kind of have a life aside from doing this.

In April 2019, the band announced they would reform in September 2019 for some live performances. The band was scheduled to play at Epicenter Festival on May 3, 2020 at Charlotte Motor Speedway, but the COVID-19 pandemic led to the festival being cancelled. Amid the pandemic, the band released a live album titled Live: It's Been Awhile on May 7, 2021. The recorded performance took place at the Foxwoods Resort Casino in Mashantucket, Connecticut.

In April 2022, the band announced a September tour, dubbed the Evening with Staind tour. In September, Mushok confirmed that a new Staind album would be released in 2023.

Staind toured in 2023. Confessions of the Fallen was released in September of that year. The album's lead single was "Lowest in Me".

Original Staind drummer Jon Wysocki died on May 18, 2024, at the age of 53, due to "issues with his liver that required him to be under the care of medical professionals".

=== Break the Cycle 25th anniversary and The Space Between the Darkness and the Light (2026–present) ===
In February 2026, Staind announced a North American Break the Cycle 25th Anniversary tour, with support from Seether, Hoobastank, and Hinder. The tour kicked off that September, and is set to go until April 2027. Prior to that, the band appeared at Welcome to Rockville in Daytona Beach, Florida in May 2026. Prior to the tour, on August 21, 2026, the band released the live album Break the Cycle (25th Anniversary Live), which was taken from a full-album performance at the Open Square mixed-use complex in Holyoke, Massachusetts in 2021.

The single "Ghosts" was released on October 14, 2026. That same day , Staind's ninth studio album was revealed to be called The Space Between the Darkness and the Light. The album's artwork, tracklist, and release date were revealed on November 11, 2026, with the album set to drop on March 5, 2027; that same day, the second single, "Watch Me Break," dropped.

== Musical style and influences ==
The topics of Staind's lyrics cover issues of depression, relationships, death, addiction, finding one's self, betrayal, and Lewis's thoughts about becoming a father in the song "Zoe Jane" from 14 Shades of Grey, as well as reflecting on his upbringing in the song "The Corner" from The Illusion of Progress. Also from 14 Shades of Grey, the track titled "Layne" was written about Alice in Chains frontman Layne Staley in response to his death in 2002. The song is also about Staley's legacy and the effect his music had on the members of Staind, especially Aaron Lewis. Staind has been categorized as alternative metal, nu metal, post-grunge, and hard rock. The band's recorded catalogue also contains ballads, which Anne Erickson of WMMR has referred to as "heartfelt".

In 2001, Rolling Stone outlined the band's relationship to the nu metal label:

Staind got their first break in 1998 when [Fred] Durst signed the band to his Flip Records. That association has linked the group with "new metal," though Break the Cycle's sound is neither particularly new nor metal. The band doesn't rap, and though Mushok has adopted new-metal's minor-key guitar riffs, Lewis' dramatic voice and the anthemic quality of such songs as "Open Your Eyes" and "Fade" are more akin to Alice in Chains than to Korn. Aggressive yet reflective, Break the Cycle doesn't require a poisonous abundance of testosterone to be appreciated and is better suited to solitary listening than to the mosh pit.

Staind's influences include Pantera, the Doors, Suicidal Tendencies, Kiss, Van Halen, Slayer, Led Zeppelin, Sepultura, Whitesnake, the Beatles, Alice in Chains, Faith No More, Deftones, Black Sabbath, Pearl Jam, Tool, Rage Against the Machine, Nirvana, Stone Temple Pilots, James Taylor, Korn and Crosby, Stills & Nash.

== Awards and nominations ==
Award	Year	Nominee(s)	Category	Result	Ref.
ASCAP Pop Music Awards	2002	"It's Been Awhile"	Most Performed Song	Won	
American Music Awards	2002	Themselves	Favorite Alternative Artist	Nominated	
Billboard Music Awards	2001	Themselves	Top Duo/Group	Nominated	
Billboard Music Awards	2001	Themselves	Top Mainstream Rock Artist	Nominated	
Billboard Music Awards	2001	Themselves	Top Modern Rock Artist	Nominated	
Billboard Music Awards	2001	"It's Been Awhile"	Top Modern Rock Track	Nominated	
Billboard Music Awards	2001	"It's Been Awhile"	Top Mainstream Rock Track	Nominated	
Billboard Music Awards	2002	"For You"	Top Mainstream Rock Track	Nominated	
Billboard Music Awards	2002	Themselves	Top Mainstream Rock Artist	Nominated	
MTV Video Music Awards	2001	"It's Been Awhile"	Best Rock Video	Nominated	
My VH1 Music Awards	2001	"It's Been Awhile"	Your Song Kicked Ass but Was Played Too Damn Much	Won	
Teen Choice Awards	2001	"It's Been Awhile"	Choice Rock Track	Nominated	
Teen Choice Awards	2003	"Price to Play"	Choice Rock Track	Nominated	

== Band members ==
Current line-up

- Aaron Lewis – lead vocals, rhythm guitar (1995–2012, 2014, 2017, 2019–present)
- Mike Mushok – lead guitar (1995–2012, 2014, 2017, 2019–present)
- Johnny April – bass, backing vocals (1995–2012, 2014, 2017, 2019–present)
- Sal Giancarelli – drums (2011–2012, 2014, 2017, 2019–present)

Former members

- Pete McEwan – bass, backing vocals (1995; died 2022)
- Jon Wysocki – drums (1995–2011; died 2024)

== Discography ==
Studio albums

- Tormented (1996)
- Dysfunction (1999)
- Break the Cycle (2001)
- 14 Shades of Grey (2003)
- Chapter V (2005)
- The Illusion of Progress (2008)
- Staind (2011)
- Confessions of the Fallen (2023)
- The Space Between the Darkness and the Light (2027)
