= Mike Mushok =

American guitarist

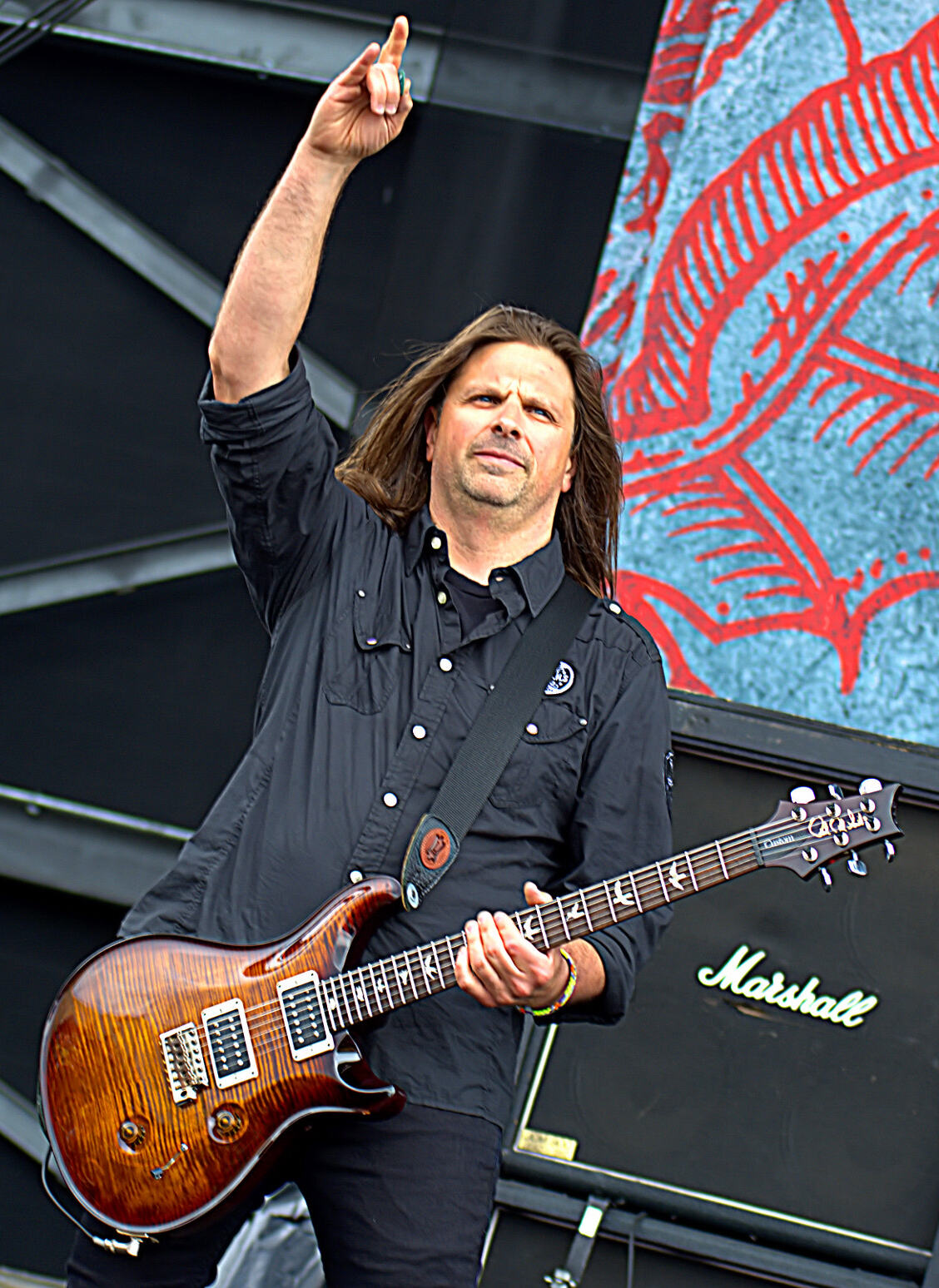
- Mushok with Saint Asonia in 2015

Background information
- Born: Michael Mushok; April 10, 1970 (age 56); Ludlow, Massachusetts, U.S.
- Genres: Alternative metal; post-grunge; nu metal; hard rock; heavy metal
- Occupation: Musician
- Instrument: Guitar
- Years active: 1995–present
- Member of: Staind; Saint Asonia
- Formerly of: Newsted

Michael Mushok (born April 10, 1970) is an American musician best known as the lead guitarist for the nu metal band Staind. He is also a member of supergroup Saint Asonia and played in the band Newsted.

Some journalists consider him to be among the best nu metal guitarists of all time. Mushok is particularly well known in musician circles for being a prominent user of baritone guitars. Ultimate Guitar explained his choice of tunings as "basically a drop G# but with top two strings one semitone higher than normal tunings, giving all fourths on top 5 strings.

== Life and career ==
Mushok was born in Ludlow, Massachusetts on April 10, 1970. He formed Staind in Springfield, Massachusetts in 1995 with Aaron Lewis, Pete McEwan and Jon Wysocki. In 1997, before Staind was set to perform an opening concert set, headlining band Limp Bizkit's frontman Fred Durst confronted them regarding seemingly Satanic cover artwork on their debut album Tormented. The band convinced Durst that the image did not convey devil worship and their performance that evening impressed him enough that he signed them to Flip Records.

Staind released the albums Dysfunction in 1999, Break the Cycle in 2001, 14 Shades of Grey in 2003, Chapter V in 2005, The Singles: 1996–2006 in 2006, The Illusion of Progress in 2008, and their self-titled album in 2011 before going on hiatus in 2012. In 2014, Staind began to tour again briefly before going on a second hiatus. They reunited for a one-off set in August 2017 and again on an ongoing basis in September 2019. In 2023, Staind released their eighth studio album, Confessions of the Fallen, their first in 12 years.

Mike Mushok with Staind in 2026

In 2013, Mushok joined heavy metal band Newsted, fronted by former Metallica bassist Jason Newsted. After Newsted disbanded in 2014, and while Lewis pursued a solo career, Mushok joined Saint Asonia in 2015.

== Personal life ==
Mushok has been married to his wife Dawn since 2002, and they have twin children.

== Discography ==
=== With Staind ===
Studio albums

- Tormented (1996)
- Dysfunction (1999)
- Break the Cycle (2001)
- 14 Shades of Grey (2003)
- Chapter V (2005)
- The Illusion of Progress (2008)
- Staind (2011)
- Confessions of the Fallen (2023)

=== With Newsted ===
Studio album

- Heavy Metal Music (2013)

=== With Saint Asonia ===
Studio albums

- Saint Asonia (2015)
- Flawed Design (2019)
- Introvert/Extrovert (2022)
