= List of HFStival performers =

Acts performing at the HFStival, a Washington, DC/Baltimore outdoor alternative rock festival, 1990–2006. It was resurrected in 2010.

Bold text indicates a headlining artist.

== 0–9 ==
- 2 Cents (2006)
- 2 Skinnee J's (1999)
- 311 (1998, 1999)
- 3 Doors Down (2001)

== A ==
- Abandoned Pools (2002)
- Adelyn (2005)
- Afghan Whigs (1994, 1996)
- AFI (2003, 2006)
- Agents of Good Roots (1998)
- Agents of the Sun (2006)
- Alien Ant Farm (2001, 2002)
- All Time Low (2006)
- American Hi-Fi (2001)
- Anti-Flag (2006)
- Aphile (2004)
- Archers of Loaf (1995)
- Army of Me (2004)
- Ash (2002)
- Atmosphere (2006)
- Audioslave (2003)
- Augustana (2006)

== B ==
- The B-52's (1998) see also Fred Schneider
- Ballyhoo (2001, 2004)
- Barcelona (2001)
- Barenaked Ladies (1998)
- Niki Barr (2003, 2006)
- The Beans (2001)
- Beck (1997)
- Belly (1993)
- Ben Folds Five (1997)
- Tony Bennett (1995)
- Better Than Ezra (1995)
- Bicycle Thieves (2003)
- The Big Hurt (2006)
- Bis (1999)
- The Black List Club (2006)
- Black Rebel Motorcycle Club (2002)
- Blonde Hair Blue Eyes (2006)
- Blink-182 (1999)
- Blondie (1997)
- Bloodhound Gang (2000)
- Blue Man Group (2000)
- Boysetsfire (2006)
- The Bravery (2005)
- Brickfoot (2000)
- Buckcherry (1999)
- Bush (1995, 1999)
- Buster (2005)

== C ==
- Cactus Patch (2001, 2002)
- Candy Machine (1995)
- Can't Hang (2005)
- The Cardigans (1997)
- Catherine Wheel (1992)
- The Charlatans (1992)
- The Chemical Brothers (1999)
- Cherry Poppin' Daddies (1998)
- Chevelle (2003)
- Citizen Cope (2002, 2005)
- Citizen King (1999)
- Coheed and Cambria (2006)
- Cold (2001)
- Coldplay (2001, 2005)
- Sandra Collins (2000, 2002, 2003, 2005)
- Colouring Lesson (1999, 2005)
- combinationLOCK (2001, 2002)
- Concrete Blonde (1990)
- Counting Crows (1994, 2006)
- Cracker (1994, 1996)
- Crash! Boom! Bang! (2005)
- The Crystal Method (1998)
- The Cult (2001)
- The Cure (2004)
- Custom Blend (2003)
- Cute Is What We Aim For (2006)
- Cut La Roc (2000)
- Cypress Hill (2000, 2004, 2006)

== D ==
- Damone (2006)
- Dashboard Confessional (2002, 2006)
- DB (2003)
- Deep Dish (2002)
- DeepSky (2002)
- Deftones (2000)
- De Rigueur (2002, 2003)
- Dieselboy (1999, 2000)
- Dishwalla (1996)
- The Dismemberment Plan (1997)
- DJ Feelgood (2000)
- DJ Rap (1999, 2005)
- DJ Swamp (2004)
- DJ Touche (1999)
- The Donnas (2003)
- Downtown Singapore (2006)
- Dropping Daylight (2006)
- Dust for Life (2001)

== E ==
- East is East (2006)
- Ebo (2001)
- Echo & the Bunnymen (1997, 2005)
- Edsel (1994)
- emmet swimming (1998, 1999)
- Eminem (2002)
- Eve 6 (2000)
- Evenout (2004)
- Everclear (1996, 1998, 1999, 2010)
- Evil Nine (2005)

== F ==
- Fall Out Boy (2004)
- FallTown (2006)
- Fastball (1998)
- Fatboy Slim (2001)
- Charles Feelgood (1999, 2001, 2004)
- Fidel (2001, 2002)
- Finch (2003)
- The Fixx (2006)
- Flyleaf (2006)
- Fools and Horses (2006)
- Foo Fighters (1996, 1998, 2005)
- Forty Acres (2006)
- Fountains of Wayne (1999)
- Freestylers (1999)
- Fuel (1998, 1999, 2001)

== G ==
- Garbage (1996, 2005)
- General Public (1995)
- Getaway Car (2003)
- Gigolo Aunts (1994)
- Gin Blossoms (1996)
- Girl Friday (2005)
- Girls Against Boys (1996)
- Gob (2002)
- God Lives Underwater (1998)
- Godsmack (2000, 2003)
- Gold Mind Squad (2005) see also Havok in Hollywood
- Goldfinger (1996, 2002)
- Goo Goo Dolls (1999)
- Good Charlotte (1999, 2000, 2001, 2002, 2003, 2005)
- Graeme's World Boy Band
- Max Graham (2001)
- Grant Lee Buffalo (1998)
- Gravity Kills (1996)
- Grayarea (2005)
- Great Mutant Skywheel (2001)
- Green Day (1998, 2001)
- Greenmachine (2002)
- The Greenberry Woods (1994) see also Splitsville
- Greenwheel (2002)
- Guided by Voices (1996)
- Guttermouth (2001)

== H ==
- Harvey Danger (1998)
- PJ Harvey (1995)
- Juliana Hatfield (1995)
- Havok in Hollywood (2006) see also Gold Mind Squad
- Hed PE (2003)
- Hearsay (1990)
- High School Hellcats (2003)
- Scott Henry
- HIM (2006)
- Peter Himmelman (1991)
- Robyn Hitchcock (1991)
- Hive (1999)
- Hoobastank (2002)
- Hot Hot Heat (2003)
- Howlin' Maggie (1996)
- Hum (1995)
- Hybrid (2004)

== I ==
- Idlewild (2001)
- Billy Idol (2005, 2010)
- Imbue (2002)
- Incubus (2001)
- Interpol (2003, 2005)
- In These Dreams (2010)
- INXS (1993)

== J ==
- Jact (1999)
- Jah Works (2002, 2004, 2006)
- James (1994)
- Jamiroquai (1997)
- Jane's Addiction (2003)
- Jar Flys (2006)
- Jawbox (1996)
- Bradley Jay (2001)
- Jay Bone and the Hackensack Misfits of Soul (1990)
- Jay-Z (2004)
- Wyclef Jean (1998)
- Jepetto (2000, 2001, 2002)
- Joan Jett (2006)
- Jewel (1996)
- Jimmie's Chicken Shack (1996, 1997, 1999, 2004, 2005, 2006)
- Jack Johnson (2003)
- JuJu (2004)
- Juniper Lane (2001, 2003)

== K ==
- Keoki (2001)
- Kill Hannah (2006)
- King Missile (1991)
- The Kottonmouth Kings (2000)
- K's Choice (1997)
- Kula Shaker (1997)

== L ==
- The La's (1991)
- Lake Trout (band) (2000)
- Laughing Colors (1999, 2000)
- Lennex (2001, 2002)
- Lifehouse (2001)
- Linkin Park (2001)
- Limp Bizkit (1999)
- liquidtodd (1998)
- Lit (1999, 2004)
- Little Kingz (2001, 2002)
- Live (1999, 2001)
- Live Alien Broadcast (1999, 2001)
- The Living End (1999, 2004)
- The Lloyd Dobler Effect (2002, 2003)
- Local H (1997)
- Loco Dice (2004)
- Long Beach Dub Allstars (1999)
- The Long Goodbye (2001)
- Lori Carson (1990)
- Lostprophets (2004)
- Lotion (1994)
- Loudermilk (2002)
- Louis XIV (2005)
- Love Arcade (2006)
- Courtney Love (1995, 1997)
- Love Nut (1998)
- Lovegroove (1999)
- Luscious Jackson (1997)
- Lush (1996)

== M ==
- Madder Rose (1994)
- Malvado (2003)
- Marcy Playground (1998)
- Margret Heater (2001, 2002)
- Mary Prankster (1999, 2000)
- Matchbook Romance (2006)
- Matisyahu (2006)
- Meat Puppets (1994)
- Micro (2001, 2002)
- The Mighty Mighty Bosstones (1997)
- Mike D & Mix Master Mike (2001)
- The Misfits (2006)
- MJ Cole (2001)
- Moby (1999)
- Modern Yesterday (1999)
- Modest Mouse (2004)
- Moodroom (2002)
- Morel (2002)
- Mother May I (1995)

== N ==
- N.E.R.D. (2002)
- Neal Coty (1990)
- Ned's Atomic Dustbin (1993)
- New Found Glory (2001, 2002, 2004)
- New York Dolls (2005)
- Nine Days (2000)
- No Doubt (1996)
- Northern State (2003)
- Nothingface (2001)

== O ==
- O.A.R. (2004)
- Paul Oakenfold (2002)
- The Ocean Blue (1991, 1992)
- Octane (2006)
- The Offspring (1999, 2004)
- OK Go (2006)
- Orgy (1999)
- Beth Orton (1999)
- Our Lady Peace (2002)
- Ozomatli (1999)

== P ==
- P.O.D. (2002, 2004)
- Panic! at the Disco (2006)
- Papa Roach (2002, 2004)
- J Paris (2006)
- Graham Parker (1992)
- Pavement (1994)
- People in Planes (2006)
- Pepper (2005)
- Phantom Planet (2002)
- Phaser (2000, 2002)
- Photek w/ MC Sharpness (2005)
- The Pietasters (2005)
- Plunge (2005, 2006)
- Iggy Pop (1993)
- The Posies (1993)
- Powderfinger (2001)
- Powerman 5000 (1999)
- The Presidents of the United States of America (1996)
- Primus (1995)
- The Prodigy (1997)
- Propellerheads (1998)
- The Pursuit of Happiness (1990. 1991)

== Q ==
- Quarashi (2002)

== R ==
- Rage Against the Machine (2000)
- Dave Ralph (2000, 2002)
- Ramones (1995)
- Rebel Amish Radio (2000, 2001)
- Red Hot Chili Peppers (1999)
- Reel Big Fish (1997)
- Reid Speed (2004)
- Reid Speed w/ MC Armanni (2005)
- Rezin (2002, 2006)
- Rise Against (2006)
- The Riverboat Gamblers (2006)
- Rock Kills Kid (2006)
- Rollins Band (1994)
- The Roots (2003)
- Rotoglow (2002)
- Run-D.M.C. (1999)

== S ==
- Sage (2003)
- Saliva (2001)
- Samiam (1998)
- Save Ferris (1998)
- Scarce (1995)
- Fred Schneider (1996) see also The B-52's
- Doug Segree (2006)
- Semisonic (1998)
- Sev (1999, 2000, 2002)
- Sevendust (2001)
- Shudder to Think (1995)
- The Sikes (2006)
- Silverchair (1999)
- Smartbomb (2000)
- Smile Empty Soul (2003)
- Social Distortion (2005)
- Solution A.D. (1996)
- Soul Asylum (1995)
- Soul Coughing (1997, 1998)
- The Soup Dragons (1992)
- Splitsville (1999) see also The Greenberry Woods
- Squirrel Nut Zippers (1997)
- SR-71 (2000, 2001)
- Stabbing Westward (2001)
- Staind (1999, 2000, 2001)
- Stars Hide Fire (2004)
- Stereo MCs (1993)
- Stereophonics (2005)
- Stone Temple Pilots (2000) see also Scott Weiland
- Stress (1991)
- The Strokes (2002, 2006)
- Subculture (2004)
- Suddenly, Tammy! (1995)
- Sugar Ray (1999)
- Sum 41 (2001, 2002, 2005)
- Supine (2001)
- Matthew Sweet (1993)
- Swift Holly (2002)
- Switchfoot (2003)

== T ==
- John Tab (1999, 2000, 2001, 2002, 2003, 2004, 2005)
- Taking Back Sunday (2004)
- Tantric (2001)
- Tenacious D (2001)
- Todd Terry (1999)
- They Might Be Giants (1992, 2005)
- Thievery Corporation (1999)
- Third Eye Blind (1997, 2000, 2010)
- Third Kind (2005)
- Throttlerod (2006)
- Thunderball (1999, 2001)
- Timo Maas Starecase Sound System (2002)
- Toad the Wet Sprocket (1994)
- Too Late The Hero (2006)
- Too Much Joy (1991, 1992)
- The Tragically Hip (1990)
- Trik Turner (2002)
- Tripping Daisy (1995)
- Tugboat Annie (2000)
- Tuscadero (1994, 1998)

== U ==
- Uncle Ho (1999)
- Underfoot (1999)
- underscore (2004)
- Unwritten Law (2002, 2005)
- Urban Style (2003)
- The Used (2003)
- UXB (2001, 2002)

== V ==
- Val Yumm (2002)
- Nico Vega (2006)
- Velocity Girl (1993)
- Vendetta Red (2003)
- Vertical Horizon (2000)
- The Verve Pipe (1997)
- Victory Twin (2005)
- The Vines (2002)
- Violent Femmes (1991, 1994, 2004)
- VooDoo Blue (2004, 2006)
- Vote Quimby (2005)

== W ==
- The Waking Hours (1999)
- Washington Social Club (2004, 2005)
- Mike Watt (1995)
- Weezer (2001) (Special concert for 200 people)
- Scott Weiland (1998) see also Stone Temple Pilots
- Kanye West (2006)
- Josh Wink (1998, 1999, 2003)
- Winter Hours (1990)
- The Wolfgang Press (1992)
- The Working Title

== X ==
- X (1993)
- X-Ecutioners (2002)

== Y ==
- Yeah Yeah Yeahs (2004)
- Yellowcard (2004)
- Y-Not (1991)
