= Music of the Mid-Atlantic United States =

The Mid-Atlantic music scene consists of mostly unsigned bands from Delaware, Maryland, New Jersey, Pennsylvania, Virginia, Washington, D.C., North Carolina, South Carolina, and West Virginia. However, there have been some success stories of bands that worked hard over the years to achieve commercial success such as Jimmie's Chicken Shack, Good Charlotte, SR-71, and Nothingface.

Every year at the HFStival, the concert features a local music stage which was started and initially run by the influential, but now defunct, regional indie label Fowl Records. Many of the artists from the Mid-Atlantic Music Scene have showcased their talents on this stage.

== Clubs and venues ==
As the Mid-Atlantic music scene is vast for the amount of land and genres of music covered, the venues that support the unsigned bands on their road to fame do their part by opening their doors and giving them the opportunity. All the while, the venues still make their quotas by bringing in the bigger names to pay the bills. Some of the more notable venues are the Bottle & Cork in Delaware, the recently revamped 8 by 10 in the Federal Hill area of Baltimore, and Fletchers in the Fells Point part of town; also Radio DJ Matt Davis of 98 Rock's (97.9 FM – WIYY) hosts Noise in the Basement. It is a night of networking for bands to perform and see others perform on Monday nights. The capacity of the club is about 250 persons upstairs for concerts.

=== Maryland ===
In Towson, Maryland, a suburb of Baltimore, the Recher Theatre used to play host to a larger crowd of 800 persons but closed in 2013. National, regional and local bands performed here, but generally the venue was for bands that have a larger fanbase. The Ottobar, located in the Charles Village neighborhood of Baltimore, is slightly smaller, but also showcases national, regional and local bands.

A much newer member of the music venue family for this scene is the former warehouse space that is now Sonar Lounge, or just "Sonar" to the club goers. Most local acts perform on the small concert side stage which has hosted larger named talent, such as former members of the Wu-Tang Clan.

=== New Jersey ===
Asbury Park, New Jersey offers a variety of venues, including the Stone Pony, The Saint, and Asbury Lanes.

=== North Carolina ===
In North Carolina, there is an annual event that highlights the talent throughout the whole region usually held during the fall season, October / November entitled the Midatlantic Music Conference . There have been over 550 performers throughout the years and many big name producers, labels and artists have graced the stages.

=== Pennsylvania ===
In Pennsylvania, Tuesday night is home to a local music showcase at the Grape Street Pub in Manayunk. To the west outside of the town of Hershey, Shakey's has been known to showcase local music, especially during the Millennium Music Conference and The Chameleon Club in Lancaster, PA is a staple of the national and regional touring circuit.

=== Virginia ===
In Virginia, another venue that contributes to the music scene as well as played host to controversial artist Vanilla Ice as a regular is Jaxx, in Springfield. A slight distance down the road is the Fairfax bar TT Reynold's. Crossing back over the Potomac river into Washington D.C., is the historic 9:30 Club.

== Independent record labels ==
- DCide
- Fowl Records
- Severn Records

== Bands ==
The following are some examples of bands and artists in the Mid-Atlantic.

=== Maryland ===
- All Time Low- Towson
- Alternate Seduction – Baltimore
- Circle of Fire – Bel Air/Baltimore
- Clutch (band) – Germantown
- The Cheaters – Annapolis
- The Dance Party – College Park
- The Dangerous Summer- Ellicott City
- Dog Fashion Disco- Rockville
- Future Islands- Baltimore
- Good Charlotte – Annapolis/Waldorf
- Jarflys – Annapolis
- Jepetto- Annapolis
- Jimmie's Chicken Shack – Annapolis
- Lake Trout – Baltimore
- Live Alien Broadcast – Baltimore/Annapolis
- Laughing Colors – Baltimore/Washington D.C.
- Lennex – Lead singer Phil Ritchie's band from Ocean City. Phil was seen on CBS's Rock Star: Supernova.
- Lower Dens – Baltimore
- Niki Barr – Denton
- Margret Heater – Baltimore
- Mary Prankster – Baltimore
- MDHC – Ocean City
- Nothingface – Baltimore
- Of a Revolution (O.A.R.) – Rockville
- Pigeons Playing Ping Pong – Baltimore
- The Seldon Plan – Baltimore
- The Skunks (ska band)- Hyattsville/Washington D.C.
- Sons Of The Radio – Laurel
- SR-71- Baltimore
- Wye Oak – Baltimore

=== Pennsylvania ===
- August Burns Red – Lancaster
- Carfax Abbey
- Halestorm – York

=== Virginia ===
- The Friday Night Boys – Northern Virginia
- Sev – Fairfax
- Lamb of God – Richmond
- Windhand – Richmond

=== District of Columbia ===
- 51 Peg
- gODHEAD
- The Pietasters
- You, Me, and Everyone We Know
