= HFStival =

American rock festival

- Logo of the 2005 HFStival held in Baltimore
- Genre: Alternative rock
- Dates: Various
- Locations: United States: Reston, Virginia; Upper Marlboro, Maryland; Washington, D.C.; Baltimore, Maryland; Columbia, Maryland
- Years active: 1990–2006, 2010–2011, 2024

The HFStival is an annual rock festival in the Washington–Baltimore area. It was held every summer from 1990 through 2006 by radio station WHFS. It was held again in 2010 and 2011 in commemoration of the now-defunct station's legacy. At its peak, the HFStival was the largest yearly music festival on the East Coast. HFStival was held at RFK Stadium in Washington, D.C. from 1993 to 2004; at M&T Bank Stadium in Baltimore in 2005; and at Merriweather Post Pavilion in Columbia, Maryland, in 2006. A revived version of the HFStival was held in 2024 at Nationals Park in Washington, D.C. Though not originally called HFStival, two earlier concerts held on the Fourth of July were the foundation for the first festival and are considered part of HFStival.

== History ==
=== 20th century ===
HFStival began in 1990 as the WHFS Fourth of July Festival, an all-day concert followed by a fireworks display, held twice at Lake Fairfax Park in Reston, Virginia, in 1990 and 1991.

In 1992, HFStival was held in Upper Marlboro, Maryland, and the following year's event, on July 4, 1993, was moved to Robert F. Kennedy Memorial Stadium in Washington, D.C., where it remained for the next six years. In 1993, when the first RFK lineup was revealed, some controversy arose among the station's listeners over the inclusion of the Stereo MCs; the previous events had only included mainstays of rock and alternative music and the MCs, a hip hop group, seemed out of place. Once the concert went on, however, the audience's enthusiasm paved the way for WHFS to include more artists from outside the station's normal playlist on the HFStival's stages, which, in future years, included hip hop acts, electronica artists, and such disparate musicians as Tony Bennett and the Blue Man Group.

In 1999, HFStival was headlined by Red Hot Chili Peppers, and was held at the larger M&T Bank Stadium in Baltimore.

=== 21st century ===
The 2000 festival was held at FedExField in Landover, Maryland, with a sold-out crowd of 90,000, the largest attendance ever for the festival, which is considered the HFStival's peak year. The 2000 festival was headlined by Rage Against the Machine and Stone Temple Pilots with a half-hour documentary produced by Washington, D.C.–based TV station MHz Networks and hosted by WHFS on-air personalities.

The strong ticket sales of the previous few years' festivals inspired the station to expand the HFStival, beginning in 2001, into a two-day event; between May 27 and 28, including over 40 artists. In 2002, the two-day formula was repeated to similar success.

On the first night of HFStival 2002, during a performance by Eminem, several members of the audience were injured when the crowd surged forward as the rapper took the stage. When the fans refused to obey his instructions to move back, the performance was suspended, allowing security and first aid personnel to act. The injured people removed from the crowd included five who required hospitalization and one man who suffered a heart attack. The incident cast doubt on whether the event, or the second day, would be allowed to continue – especially in light of the negative publicity the venue received when a concertgoer was hospitalized after a lightning strike at the 1998 Tibetan Freedom Concert. Eminem's performance, the following DJ set, and Day 2 of the festival eventually went on as planned.

Lagging ticket sales seemed to threaten the festival's future for a while, first when it was reduced for 2003 from two days back to one, and again when a planned second Fall Edition was cancelled following a scheduling conflict that required a change of date and venue. Several big-name artists were forced to pull out, severely affecting ticket sales.

In early 2005, the station abruptly went off the air, replaced by a Spanish language Latin pop format, and listeners feared the HFStival's days had come to an end. Shortly afterward, parent company Infinity Broadcasting revived WHFS with a new frequency and a new city and, with it, brought the HFStival back. HFStival 2005, held at Baltimore's M&T Bank Stadium, was notably different from previous affairs, featuring a lineup of artists from all points of the station's long history: original punk rockers The New York Dolls shared a stage with hard rock icon Billy Idol, veteran alternative band They Might Be Giants, and current rising stars like The Bravery. Approximately 53,000 seats were filled – nearly equivalent to a sold-out RFK Stadium.

The 2006 HFStival was held the weekend of May 27–28, 2006, at Merriweather Post Pavilion in Columbia, Maryland, which more than doubled its normal capacity in order to accommodate the event's more than 40,000 attendees over the weekend event. The Pavilion's amphitheatre-style main stage featured the event's headlining artists, with the two additional stages located in the parking lot and in the surrounding woods. Despite being advertised up until a week before the event, the "Buzz Tent", a dance / DJ area, was cancelled shortly beforehand.

In early 2007, WHFS was rebranded "Baltimore's FM Talk", splitting off nearly all music to its HD radio channel HFS2. No official information came forth from the station regarding the HFStival, except for an announcement that it would be held in 2007. The only artist confirmed to perform was local metalcore band aFREUDIANSLIP, winners of the station's "Road to the Festival" band competition. The 2007 concert was not held.

The 2010 HFStival was held on September 18, 2010, at Merriweather Post Pavilion in Columbia, Maryland. The 2011 edition of the event took place on September 17, again at Merriweather Post Pavilion.

On June 5, 2024, the social media accounts for the 9:30 Club and Nationals Park posted a teaser image that indicated the HFStival would return on Saturday, September 21, 2024, at Nationals Park in Washington, D.C.

On June 11, 2024, the official lineup and tickets for the September 21, 2024, show were released; performing artists were announced, including The Postal Service, Death Cab for Cutie, Incubus, Bush, Garbage, Jimmy Eat World, Girl Talk, Violent Femmes, Tonic, Filter and Lit. Garbage ultimately did not perform and was replaced by Liz Phair.

== Lineups ==
Lineups are listed in reverse order, with the first band listed playing last.

Date	Location	Lineup			
July 4, 1990	Lake Fairfax Park, Reston, VA	The Pursuit of Happiness, Neal Coty, Jay Bone and the Hackensack Misfits of Soul, Hearsay, Concrete Blonde, The Tragically Hip, Winter Hours, Lori Carson, Gang of Four			
July 4, 1991	Lake Fairfax Park, Reston, VA	Violent Femmes, Gang of Four, Too Much Joy, The La's, The Ocean Blue, Robyn Hitchcock, King Missile, Stress, Peter Himmelman, Y-Not?!			
July 11, 1992	Prince George's Equestrian Center, Upper Marlboro, MD	The Soup Dragons, The Charlatans UK, The Ocean Blue, They Might Be Giants, Graham Parker, Catherine Wheel, Too Much Joy, The Wolfgang Press, Manifesto			
July 3, 1993	RFK Stadium, Washington, D.C.	INXS, Iggy Pop, Ned's Atomic Dustbin, Stereo MCs, Belly, Matthew Sweet, The Posies, X, Velocity Girl			
May 14, 1994	RFK Stadium, Washington, D.C.	Inner Stage		Outer Stage	
May 14, 1994	RFK Stadium, Washington, D.C.	Counting Crows, Cracker, Toad the Wet Sprocket, Meat Puppets, James, Pavement, Rollins Band, Violent Femmes, Afghan Whigs		Gigolo Aunts, Tuscadero, The Greenberry Woods, Lotion, Madder Rose, Edsel	
June 3, 1995	RFK Stadium, Washington, D.C.	Inner Stage		Outer Stage	
June 3, 1995	RFK Stadium, Washington, D.C.	Ramones, Tony Bennett, Soul Asylum, PJ Harvey, Primus, Courtney Love, General Public, Bush, Mike Watt, Better Than Ezra, Juliana Hatfield, Shudder to Think		Suddenly, Tammy!, Mother May I, Candy Machine, Tripping Daisy, Scarce, Archers of Loaf, Hum	
June 1, 1996	RFK Stadium, Washington, D.C.	Inner Stage		Outer Stage	
June 1, 1996	RFK Stadium, Washington, D.C.	Goldfinger, Foo Fighters, Cracker, Afghan Whigs, The Presidents of the United States of America, Garbage, Jewel, Gin Blossoms, Everclear, No Doubt, Lush, Jawbox		Gravity Kills, Fred Schneider, Girls Against Boys, Jimmie's Chicken Shack, Dishwalla, Guided by Voices, Solution A.D., Howlin' Maggie	
May 31, 1997	RFK Stadium, Washington, D.C.	Inner Stage		Outer Stage	
May 31, 1997	RFK Stadium, Washington, D.C.	The Prodigy, Beck, Jamiroquai, Echo & the Bunnymen, Local H, Luscious Jackson, The Verve Pipe, Blondie, Kula Shaker, The Mighty Mighty Bosstones, The Cardigans		Squirrel Nut Zippers, Ben Folds Five, Third Eye Blind, Reel Big Fish, K's Choice, Soul Coughing, Jimmie's Chicken Shack, The Dismemberment Plan, Poole	
May 16, 1998	RFK Stadium, Washington, D.C.	Inner Stage		Outer Stage	Trancemissions Tent
May 16, 1998	RFK Stadium, Washington, D.C.	The Crystal Method, Green Day, Scott Weiland, Foo Fighters, The B-52's, The Mighty Mighty Bosstones, Everclear, Barenaked Ladies, Wyclef Jean, Marcy Playground, Soul Coughing, Semisonic, Tuscadero		Cherry Poppin' Daddies, Samiam, God Lives Underwater, Save Ferris, Fastball, Harvey Danger, Fuel, Agents of Good Roots, Love Nut, Grant Lee Buffalo	Propellerheads, Josh Wink, Scott Henry, liquidtodd
May 29, 1999	PSI Net Stadium, Baltimore, MD.	Inner Stage		Street Stage	Trancemissions Tent
May 29, 1999	PSI Net Stadium, Baltimore, MD.	Red Hot Chili Peppers, The Offspring, Moby, Goo Goo Dolls, Live, Sugar Ray, Orgy, The Mighty Mighty Bosstones, Silverchair, Blink-182, Lit, Jimmie's Chicken Shack		2 Skinnee J's, Freestylers, The Living End, Buckcherry, Ozomatli, Citizen King, Beth Orton, Fountains of Wayne, Sev	Moby, Josh Wink, Thunderball, Hive, Feelgood, Todd Terry, DJ Rap, Scott Henry, Lieven
September 25, 1999	RFK Stadium, Washington, D.C.	Main Stage	Street Stage	Locals Only	Trancemissions Tent
September 25, 1999	RFK Stadium, Washington, D.C.	Limp Bizkit, The Chemical Brothers, Run DMC, Bush, 311, Everclear, Filter, Buckcherry, Jimmie's Chicken Shack, Powerman 5000, Fuel	Long Beach Dub Allstars, Staind, Sev (band), Bis, Uncle Ho, Splitsville, Jact	Underfoot, Laughing Colors, Mary Prankster, Colouring Lesson, Good Charlotte, Live Alien Broadcast, Modern Yesterday, The Waking Hours	Thievery Corporation, Dieselboy, DJ Touche, John Tab, Feelgood, Lovegroove, Scott Henry, Lieven
May 28, 2000	FedExField, Landover, MD	Main Stage	Street Stage	Locals Only	Trancemissions Tent
May 28, 2000	FedExField, Landover, MD	Rage Against the Machine, Stone Temple Pilots, Blue Man Group, Third Eye Blind, Cypress Hill, Godsmack, Filter, Deftones, Staind, Bloodhound Gang, Vertical Horizon, Sev	The Kottonmouth Kings, Eve 6, Nine Days, SR-71, Good Charlotte, Tugboat Annie, Jepetto	Smartbomb, Brickfoot, Phaser, Lake Trout, Mary Prankster, Laughing Colors, Rebel Amish Radio, Jepetto	Dieselboy, Dave Ralph, Cut La Roc, Sandra Collins, John Tab, Lieven, DJ Feelgood, Scott Henry
May 27–28, 2001	RFK Stadium, Washington, D.C.	Main Stage, day 1	Street Stage, day 1	Locals Only, day 1	Trancemissions Tent, day 1
May 27–28, 2001	RFK Stadium, Washington, D.C.	Fatboy Slim, Live, Green Day, Incubus, Tenacious D, 3 Doors Down, The Cult, Fuel, Lifehouse, Sevendust, Coldplay, SR-71, New Found Glory	Good Charlotte, Nothingface, New Found Glory, Dust for Life, Saliva, American Hi-Fi, Powderfinger, Guttermouth, Cactus Patch	The Long Goodbye, Ballyhoo!, Barcelona, combinationLOCK, Fidel, Rebel Amish Radio, Ebo, Great Mutant Skywheel	Bradley Jay, Thunderball, Lieven, Max Graham, MJ Cole, Keoki
May 27–28, 2001	RFK Stadium, Washington, D.C.	Main Stage, day 2	Street Stage, day 2	Locals Only, day 2	Trancemissions Tent, day 2
May 27–28, 2001	RFK Stadium, Washington, D.C.	Mike D & Mix Master Mike, Staind, Live, Fatboy Slim, 3 Doors Down, Fuel, Linkin Park, Stabbing Westward, Coldplay, Lifehouse, Good Charlotte, American Hi-Fi, Little Kingz	SR-71, Powderfinger, Saliva, Cold, Sum 41, Tantric, Idlewild, Cactus Patch	Margret Heater, Juniper Lane, Supine, Lennex, The Beans, Live Alien Broadcast, Jepetto, UXB	John Tab, MJ Cole, Micro, Charles Feelgood, Scott Henry
May 25–26, 2002	RFK Stadium, Washington, D.C.	Main Stage, day 1	Street Stage, day 1	Locals Only, day 1	Buzz Tent, day 1
May 25–26, 2002	RFK Stadium, Washington, D.C.	Paul Oakenfold, Eminem, Hoobastank, Sum 41, The Strokes, Our Lady Peace, N.E.R.D., Black Rebel Motorcycle Club, Quarashi, Sev, The Lloyd Dobler Effect, Little Kingz	New Found Glory, Goldfinger, Trik Turner, Citizen Cope, The Vines, Greenwheel, Ash, Graeme's World Boy Band	Imbue, Margret Heater, Cactus Patch, Fidel, combinationLOCK, Jah Works, Swift Holly, Val Yumm	Deep Dish, Morel, John Tab, Scott Henry, Timo Maas Starecase Sound System
May 25–26, 2002	RFK Stadium, Washington, D.C.	Main Stage, day 2	Street Stage, day 2	Locals Only, day 2	Buzz Tent, day 2
May 25–26, 2002	RFK Stadium, Washington, D.C.	X-Ecutioners, P.O.D., Papa Roach, Sum 41, Hoobastank, Unwritten Law, Our Lady Peace, New Found Glory, Good Charlotte, Dashboard Confessional, Trik Turner, Little Kingz	Black Rebel Motorcycle Club, Phantom Planet, The Vines, Citizen Cope, Gob, Loudermilk, Abandoned Pools, The Lloyd Dobler Effect	Jepetto, UXB, Lennex, Moodroom, Phaser, Rotoglow, Rezin, Green Machine	William Dieter, DeepSky (cancelled), Micro, Sandra Collins, Dave Ralph, Paul Oakenfold
May 24, 2003	RFK Stadium, Washington, D.C.	Main Stage	Street Stage	Locals Only	Buzz Tent
May 24, 2003	RFK Stadium, Washington, D.C.	Godsmack, Audioslave, Good Charlotte, Jane's Addiction, Chevelle, The Roots, AFI, Jack Johnson, The Used, The Donnas, Finch	Getaway Car, Vendetta Red, Hed PE, Hot Hot Heat, Interpol, Northern State, Smile Empty Soul, Switchfoot	The Lloyd Dobler Effect, Juniper Lane, Bicycle Thieves, Niki Barr, Custom Blend, Urban Style, High School Hellcats, Malvado	Sandra Collins, Josh Wink, Scott Henry, DB, Sage, John Tab
May 22, 2004	RFK Stadium, Washington, D.C.	Main Stage	Street Stage	Locals Only	Buzz Tent
May 22, 2004	RFK Stadium, Washington, D.C.	The Cure, The Offspring, Jay-Z, P.O.D., New Found Glory, Violent Femmes, Cypress Hill, Papa Roach, Lostprophets, Yellowcard, O.A.R., Voodoo Blue	Modest Mouse, Yeah Yeah Yeahs, Lit, The Living End, Fall Out Boy, Taking Back Sunday	Jimmie's Chicken Shack, Stars Hide Fire, Washington Social Club, Army of Me, Jah Works, Aphile, Ballyhoo, Subculture, underscore, Evenout	Reid Speed, DJ Swamp, Loco Dice, Feelgood, Scott Henry, Hybrid, JuJu, John Tab
May 14, 2005	M&T Bank Stadium, Baltimore, MD	Main Stage	Street Stage	Locals Only	Trancemissions Tent
May 14, 2005	M&T Bank Stadium, Baltimore, MD	Foo Fighters, Coldplay, Billy Idol, Good Charlotte, Social Distortion, New York Dolls, Garbage, Echo & the Bunnymen, Interpol, They Might Be Giants, Louis XIV, The Bravery, Gold Mind Squad	Sum 41, Unwritten Law, Pepper, Stereophonics, Jimmie's Chicken Shack, Citizen Cope, Washington Social Club	The Pietasters, Adelyn, Victory Twin, Plunge, Colouring Lesson, Crash Boom Bang, Can't Hang, Vote Quimby, Girl Friday, Third Kind	Sandra Collins, Scott Henry, DJ Rap, Grayarea, Photek w/ MC Sharpness, Reid Speed w/ MC Armanni, Evil Nine, Buster, John Tab
May 27–28, 2006	Merriweather Post Pavilion, Columbia, MD	Main Stage, day 1		Side Stage, day 1	Locals Stage, day 1
May 27–28, 2006	Merriweather Post Pavilion, Columbia, MD	Matisyahu, Kanye West, Cypress Hill, Rise Against, Panic! at the Disco, Atmosphere, The Misfits, OK Go, Jimmie's Chicken Shack, All Time Low		Cute Is What We Aim For, Rock Kills Kid, The Working Title, J Paris, VooDoo Blue, Anti-Flag, 2 Cents, Nico Vega, Dropping Daylight, Too Late The Hero, Downtown Singapore	The Big Hurt, Fools and Horses, Throttlerod, The Black List Club, Jah Works, Colouring Lesson, Blonde Hair Blue Eyes, Doug Segree
May 27–28, 2006	Merriweather Post Pavilion, Columbia, MD	Main Stage, day 2		Side Stage, day 2	Locals Stage, day 2
May 27–28, 2006	Merriweather Post Pavilion, Columbia, MD	Counting Crows, Dashboard Confessional, The Strokes, AFI, H.I.M., Coheed and Cambria, Joan Jett and the Blackhearts, The Fixx, Matchbook Romance, All Time Low		Flyleaf, Kill Hannah, Plunge, The Riverboat Gamblers, boysetsfire, Forty Acres, People in Planes, Damone, Augustana, Love Arcade, As Fast As	Havok in Hollywood, FallTown, Jarflys, Niki Barr, East Is East, Agents of the Sun, Rezin, Octane
September 18, 2010	Merriweather Post Pavilion, Columbia, MD	Main Stage		Local Stage	
September 18, 2010	Merriweather Post Pavilion, Columbia, MD	Third Eye Blind, Billy Idol, Everclear, Naughty by Nature, Ed Kowalczyk, The Presidents of the United States of America, Fuel, Lit, Marcy Playground, FunkMnkyz		Jimmie's Chicken Shack, SuperBob, Jah Works, Fools and Horses, Lionize, Honor by August, Middle Distance Runner, RPM – Restoring Poetry in Music	
September 17, 2011	Merriweather Post Pavilion, Columbia, MD	Main Stage		Local Stage	
September 17, 2011	Merriweather Post Pavilion, Columbia, MD	The Avett Brothers, Flogging Molly, Dr. Dog, Jimmie's Chicken Shack, Clutch, Minus the Bear, Gin Blossoms, Diane Birch		Lionize, Pasadena, Justin Trawick, FunkMnkyz, Middle Distance Runner, Lloyd Dobler Effect, Tennis System, Vessel	
September 21, 2024	Nationals Park, Washington DC	The Postal Service, Death Cab for Cutie, Incubus, Bush, Liz Phair, Jimmy Eat World, Girl Talk, Violent Femmes, Tonic, Filter, Lit			

- The cancelled 2003 Fall Edition was to have featured Limp Bizkit, Staind, O.A.R., Yellowcard, Jet, Deftones, The Black Eyed Peas, Rancid, Thrice, Black Rebel Motorcycle Club, Eve 6, Three Days Grace, Citizen Cope, Electric Six, Interpol, and SR-71. Duran Duran was also scheduled to appear, but the event was cancelled before they were announced.

== See also ==
- List of HFStival performers
- Music of Maryland
- KROQ Weenie Roast
