= Unsung Hero (magazine) =

American music magazine

- Editor-in-Chief: Greg Christianson
- Managing editor: D.X. Ferris
- Lead artist: Matt Crowner
- Categories: Music
- Circulation: 50,000
- Founder: Suzanne Christianson; Greg Christianson
- Founded: 1999
- First issue: July 2000; 25 years ago
- Final issue Number: March 2002; 24 years ago 21
- Company: Quantum Horizon Media Group
- Country: United States
- Language: English
- Website: uhero.com
- ISSN: 1534-3863

Unsung Hero, also known as Uhero Magazine, was a music magazine publication based out of Gettysburg, Pennsylvania. It was an American magazine devoted to unsigned music and popular culture, centralized in the mid-Atlantic region of the United States.

The magazine focused on unsigned music artists and bands to spotlight, as well as other music-related articles.

== History ==
Created by Suzanne and Greg Christianson of Gettysburg, Pennsylvania, out of a passion for great music that had yet to be discovered on a national level. This husband and wife team not only published a magazine together, but a supplemental website as well.

The magazine became a sponsor of Millennium Music Conference in 2000.

== Style ==
As a smaller publication, Unsung Hero, followed in the vein of Rolling Stone and Spin magazines, focusing on music, fashion, and culture. It was often referred to as the "Bible of Local Music". Each month's magazine had a print run of approximately 50,000 copies, and was freely available.

== Staff ==
While there were three people on the staff with the surname "Baker", none of the employees were related to each other. The Christianson's, however, were related: they were married to each other.

=== Editorial department ===
- Greg Christianson, Editor In Chief
- D.X. Ferris, Managing Editor

=== Art department ===
- Matt Crowner, Lead Artist
  - All artwork for the cover design, article spreads, and layout out of ad space was handled by Matt.

=== Public relations ===
- Kevin Baker, Director of Public Relations
  - Kevin, a member of Baltimore band, Live Alien Broadcast, handled the public image of the magazine as well as getting unsigned bands involved with the magazine.
- Andrea Baker, Merchandising Representative
  - Andrea joined the staff as the representative at shows sponsored by Unsung Hero to distribute magazines and merchandise. She was experienced with grassroots street-team management and band promotions, from her company Emerging Sounds.
- Lizzy.Dean Holyfield, Promotions Director
  - In addition to running promotions for the magazine, Lizzy.Dean also was a contributing writer giving his spin on the local scene. He also did a weekly segment on MHZ T.V. in DC. Lizzy.Dean also was a member of Baltimore band, Great Mutant Skywheel.
- Sheba Shough, Concert Series Management
  - Sheba was the magazine's primary Agent/Liaison for communication with/between musicians in the Mid-Atlantic Region. Her primary roles included booking, promoting, and managing live events. She managed live shows (i.e. PR, stage set-up, artist settlement), and acted as primary events planner for the Mid-Atlantic regional "Concert Series" that provided financial support to Unsung Hero Magazine.

=== Sales ===
- Suzanne Christianson, Main Sales
- Chris Keith, Director of Sales & Marketing
- Lori Bernish, Pittsburgh Area Ad Sales & Distribution

The sales staff would sell the ad space for venues, bands, artists, and other music related products to be advertised in the magazine. The distribution was nationwide in mostly music clubs, Hot Topic stores, and other trendy locations.

=== Contributing writers ===
- Mitch Kramer, cover article for Issue 31: Weapons for Peace

=== Features ===
10 Minutes w/ Shana : Shana Baker The main article or cover story of the artist or featured band was written by Shana. Shana would catch a show or performance and sit down with the subject(s) to obtain the story.

The Noise : eEL The Noise was a small and short section in the back of the magazine for CD and album reviews of music submitted by artists and bands to the magazine.

UH.X : Donna Wise The local radio station in Harrisburg, Pennsylvania (105.7 the X) would feature artists and bands that would be featured and reviewed in the magazine.

== Venues ==
Several music clubs within the mid-atlantic collaborated with Unsung Hero magazine for artist showcases and magazine releases. Most notable were Fat Daddy's in York, PA; the Chameleon in Lancaster, PA; the Crowbar in PA; and the Recher Theater in Baltimore, MD.

As the magazine grew in success, it started the Uhero Concert Series. The following cities and clubs took part:

- Springfield, VA: Jaxx
- Philadelphia, PA: Grape Street Pub
- Baltimore, MD: 8x10
- Baltimore, MD: The Ottobar
- Reading, PA: Hiester's
- Pittsburgh: Club Laga
- Fairfax, VA: TT Reynolds
- Lancaster, PA: Blue Star Inn
- Washington DC: 9:30 Club
- New York City, NY: Downtime
- New York City, NY: The Continental

== Magazine covers ==
=== 2000 ===
- January - Issue 7: Mary Prankster
- February - Issue 8:
- March - Issue 9: Darcie Miner
- April - Issue 10:
- May - Issue 11:
- June - Issue 12:
- July - Issue 13:
- August - Issue 14:
- September - Issue 15:
- October - Issue 16:
- November - Issue 17:
- December - Issue 18:

=== 2001 ===
- January - Issue 19: Project67
- February - Issue 20:
- March - Issue 21:
- April - Issue 22:
- May - Issue 23:
- June - Issue 24:
- July - Issue 25:
- August - Issue 26: Cactus Patch
- September - Issue 27: Fidel
- October - Issue 28: Buzz Poets
- November - Issue 29: Rezin
- December - Issue 30: Ivet

=== 2002 ===
- January - Issue 31: Gargantua Soul
- February - Issue 32: Weapons for Peace
- March - Issue 33: Margret Heater
