= Blue Skies Over Dundalk =

Studio album by Mary Prankster
- Released: May 21, 1998
- Genre: Rock
- Length: 18:59
- Label: Fowl Records
- Producer: Steve Wright, Mary Prankster

Mary Prankster chronology
Mata Hari EP (1996)	Blue Skies Over Dundalk (1998)	Roulette Girl (1999)

Blue Skies Over Dundalk was the first studio album by Mary Prankster.

The title refers to Prankster's hometown of Dundalk, Maryland.

The album was later re-released as Blue Skies Forever, where it was remastered and included the tracks from Prankster's first release, the self-released Mata Hari EP.

== Track listing ==
All songs by Mary Prankster

1. "Tits and Whiskey" – 1:39
2. "Piss Off" – 1:56
3. "Mac and Cheese" – 1:32
4. "Blues Skies Over Dundalk" – 1:31
5. "Sadie Hawkins Day" – 2:46
6. "Breakfast" – 1:45
7. "Green Eggs and Hamlet" – 1:20
8. "Student Loan" – 1:23
9. "Mercyfuck" – 2:48
10. "Valentine " – 2:14

== Personnel ==
- Mary Prankster – vocals, guitar
- Mike Lackey – lead guitar
- Cord Neal – bass
- Matt Collorafice – drums
- Steve Wright – engineer
