= Tell Your Friends =

Tell Your Friends may refer to:

- Tell Your Friends (Mary Prankster album), 2002
- Tell Your Friends (Snarky Puppy album), 2010
- "Tell Your Friends" (The Weeknd song), 2015
- Tell Your Friends, debut EP by Dark Stares, 2012
- "Tell Your Friends", song by Liam Payne from LP1, 2019
