= Roulette Girl =

Studio album by Mary Prankster
- Released: November 23, 1999
- Genre: Rock
- Length: 25:54
- Label: Fowl Records
- Producer: Rennie Grant, Mary Prankster, Steve Wright

Mary Prankster chronology
Blue Skies Over Dundalk (1998)	Roulette Girl (1999)	Blue Skies Forever (2002)

Professional ratings
Review scores
Source	Rating
Allmusic	3/5 stars

Roulette Girl is the second album by Mary Prankster.

== Track listing ==
All songs by Mary Prankster

1. "Roulette Girl" – 3:36
2. "The Bottle's Talking Now" – 1:57
3. "The World Is Full of Bastards" – 1:54
4. "Swan Dive" – 2:47
5. "Rational Bohemian" – 2:39
6. "Mata Hari" – 1:59
7. "Punk Rock Heaven" – 1:37
8. "Tempest" – 2:08
9. "Takes His Place" – 4:21
10. "New Tricks" – 2:52

== Personnel ==
- Mary Prankster – vocals, guitar
- Jon E. Cakes – bass guitar on all tracks, acoustic guitar on "New Tricks"
- Phil Tang – drums
- Rennie Grant – lead guitar, additional rhythm guitar
- Jimmi Sexton – guitar solo on "Roulette Girl"
- Allyson Daniels – gospel vocals and arrangement
- Marcella Daniel – gospel vocals
- Wenona R. Daniel – gospel vocals
- Ursula Encarnacion – string arrangement, cello
- Raili Haimila – viola
- Jenny Takamatsu – violin
- Larry "The Horn" Williams – french horn
- Elisa Koehler – horn arrangement, trumpet
- Matt Belzer – clarinet
