= Margret Heater =

American nu metal band

Background information
- Origin: Baltimore, Maryland, U.S.
- Genres: Nu metal, alternative metal
- Years active: 1997–2003
- Labels: Eyeless Kitty, Fowl
- Past members: Brandon Fogle; Stephen Baucom; Jasan Stepp; Greg Plummer

Margret Heater was an American nu metal band from Baltimore, Maryland, active from 1997 to 2003.

== History ==
Margret Heater formed in 1997 Fayetteville, North Carolina and later relocated to Baltimore, Maryland. The group had experimented with many styles in the metal and heavy metal genre. In 2000, the band toured both the East and West Coasts extensively without major label support, all financed by the band. Included on this tour were fellow East Coast musicians Jepetto. The band had also performed with major label acts such as Green Day, Snapcase, Suicide Machines, Papa Roach, Sev, Good Charlotte, 6Gig, Liquid Gang, and Nothingface.

Drummer Stephen Baucom and guitarist Jasan Stepp met while paratroopers in the military. They discussed forming a band, taking the name Margret Heater from a character in a story written years before. They soon recruited lead singer Duke Aipa to be their frontman.

Although not a member of the earliest incarnation of Margret Heater, Greg Plummer had played in a high school band called "Uncle Lumpy" with Stepp. Uncle Lumpy released one recording, an album called Chicken A La King. Plummer was at Franklin Pierce College playing in a band called "Down Funk Boulevard" when he was asked to join Margret Heater. A few years later the band swapped singers of another Baltimore band "20 on the Hype" to get Brandon Fogle as their new frontman.

Eventually, Stephen and the rest of the band parted ways. Drummer Alex Crowley, formerly of Downpour, joined to keep their legacy intact. While with the band, Alex and the others appeared on the cover of Unsung Hero for their last in print publication.

Later in the year, during a show at Washington D.C.'s 9:30 Club, Alex fell off the drum riser and broke his right arm. Coincidentally, Mike Sipple, formerly the drummer of Jimmie's Chicken Shack, was his roommate and stepped in and later replaced Alex full-time.

In the summer of 2002, the band traveled to Maine again as cast members for Edwards' movie Kiwahkwe: Curse of the Lobster. Greg, Brandon, and Jasan all play characters of the same name from a band of the same name and all suffer horrific deaths at the claws of a giant lobster. Margret Heater also is featured on the movie's soundtrack. The tracks performed in the movie are "Double Rock Park" and "Victory Garden", and the soundtrack will feature the never before released "Say What You Want". The film, which was created entirely with an independent crew and no budget is still being completed.

The band broke up after their final show on New Year's Eve 2002. Their final show was performed at Fletchers Bar, in Baltimore, amongst their friends and family. They brought in the year 2003, not knowing this would be the end of an era to themselves and their fans. Brandon moved to California three months later to join fellow Baltimore band member from ".click." friend Keith Thompson in, Bleed the Dream. At the same time, Jasan stayed in Baltimore and joined Dog Fashion Disco. Greg moved back home to Maine. Mike retired from the music business. Alex moved on to Annapolis, Maryland band Vote Quimby.

Jasan is now in the band Polkadot Cadaver with former Dog Fashion Disco frontman Todd Smith.

== Notable performances ==
- Artisan Pictures' Blair Witch II Release Party
- The WHFS Fells' Point Festival 2000
- July 4 Smoke-In at the White House
- US Naval Academy
- HFStival

== Members ==
- Stephen Baucom – Drums, Percussion (member: 1997–2001; died 2024)
- Duke Aipa – Vocals (member: 1997–1998)
- Brandon Fogle – Vocals (member: 1998–2003) aka Brandon Thomas, recently in Bleed the Dream
- Jasan Stepp – Guitar, Cello, Vocals (member: 1997–2003), left to join Dog Fashion Disco, currently in Polkadot Cadaver and Knives Out!
- Greg Plummer – Bass Guitar, Screams (member: 1997–2003)
- Alex Crowley – Drums, Percussion (member: 2001–2002)
- Mike Sipple – Drums, Percussion (member: 2002–2003), formerly of Jimmie's Chicken Shack

== Discography ==
=== Albums ===
- The Blue Album
- Manifest – Features a cover of Depeche Mode's "Enjoy the Silence".
- Destiny – Dave Bilbrough produced re-mixes and Techno/House versions of Margret Heater's album "Manifest". The album Destiny includes 70 minutes of high energy, and experimental sounds.
- The Frankenrecord

=== EPs ===
- Pre-Manifest
- Manifest-Destiny Sampler
- Kentucky Fried Chicken Album
- Live and Raw Mix
- 2002 Sampler, Pre-Frankenrecord release

== Accomplishments ==
- Voted 'Best Rhythm Section' / Music Monthly Magazine
- Honorable mentions: 'Best Metal' and 'Best Hardcore' / Music Monthly Magazine
- Top 5 in Fowl.com's sales charts for four straight months

== See also ==
- List of HFStival acts
