= Live Alien Broadcast =

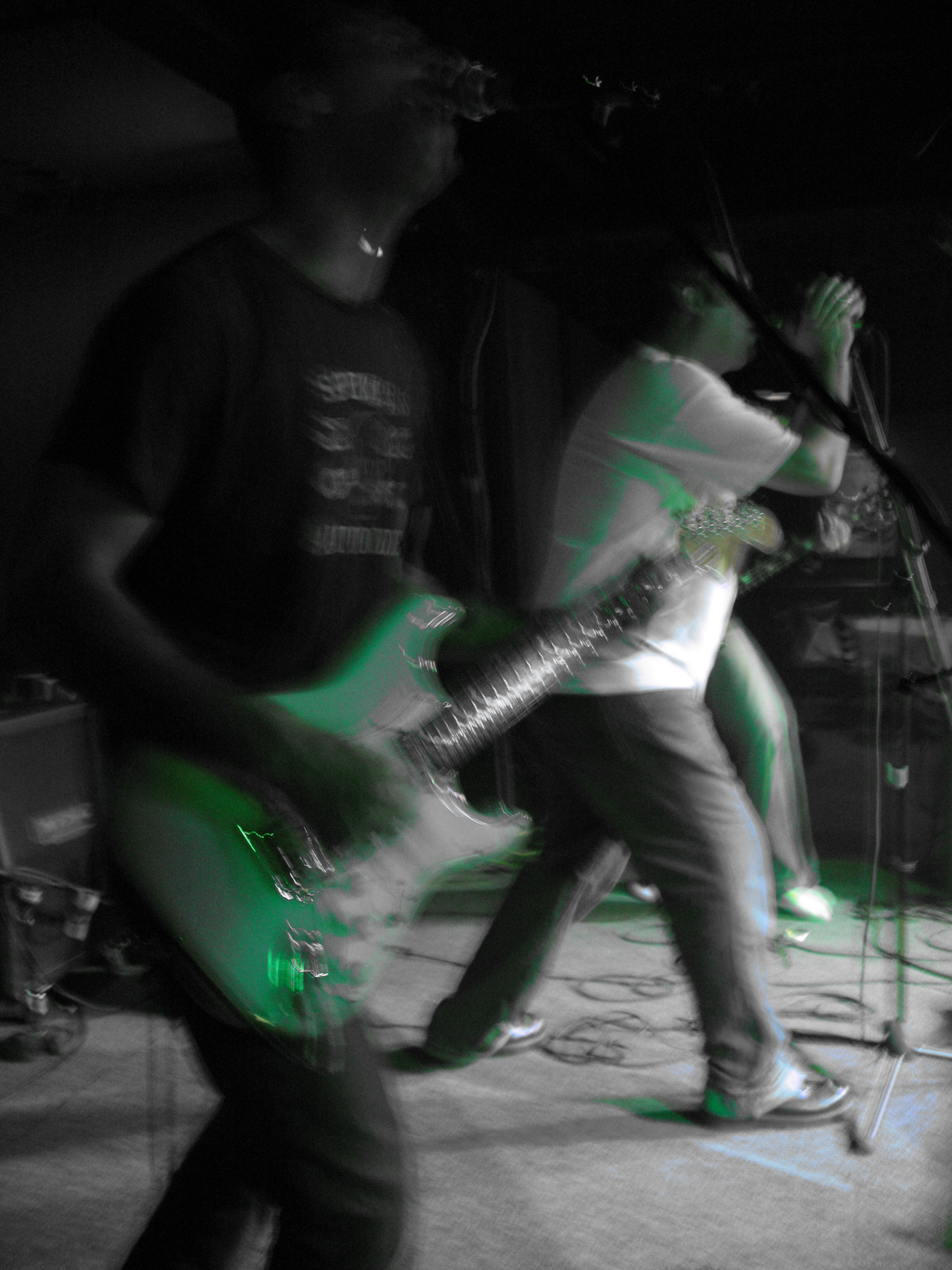
- Live Alien Broadcast performing at the Whiskey 1803 in Annapolis, Maryland on November 3, 2006.

Background information
- Origin: Baltimore, Maryland, United States
- Genres: Rock
- Years active: 1994–present
- Label: Mothership/Gig Records
- Members: Jeff Jones; Kevin Baker; Don DeOliveira; Matt Toronto
- Past members: Rob Lasky; DJ Geoffro; Mike "Bigga" Haight; Jason Fublar; Alan Cook; Ray Dobson; Dave Dobson
- Website: http://www.livealienbroadcast.com

Live Alien Broadcast is a Baltimore-based rock band that began between the Washington D.C. suburb of Gaithersburg, Maryland and Baltimore City, as a straight up heavy band and later incorporated a DJ and samples to their sound.

== Biography ==
During the mid-to-late 1990s through the first part of the 2000 decade, Live Alien Broadcast was a strong musical presence in the Mid-Atlantic Music Scene. They were voted "Best Live Show" by Music Monthly Magazine. They are commonly known and referred to as L.A.B., for short.

The band has played with national acts such as Limp Bizkit, Kid Rock, 2 Skinnee J's, Jimmie's Chicken Shack, and Kottonmouth Kings.

Originally, the band started with two members, Don DeOliveira and Rob Lasky of the band Tattoo Taxi from Baltimore. The pair decided to start anew, and Fubler, Cook, then (after a long search) Jones answered an advertisement in ROX Magazine and met up with DeOliveira and Lasky. A demo was recorded at Flite III studios in Baltimore and they began playing gigs in the local Baltimore/Washington area. Due to personal and financial reasons, Cook was let go, and Kevin Baker joined shortly thereafter. In 1996 Lasky, DeOliveira, Fubler, Baker, and Jones became the core members of L.A.B.

When drummer Rob Lasky left the band in 1997, L.A.B. decided to move in a new direction, inviting former Orange Whip drummer Jerome Maffeo and Dancehall DJ Michael "Bigga" Haight to join the band.

In 1999, Live Alien Broadcast went through another lineup change that has essentially remained the current. DJ Bigga Mike and drummer Jerome Maffeo, left L.A.B. to join another local band Fidel. Shortly after their departure, the band recruited DJ Geoffro and drummer Matt Toronto joined the band.

L.A.B. has played to large-scale audiences at venues like RFK Stadium for the Annual HFStival in 2001 and at the famous 9:30 Club in Washington D.C.

=== The "Hiatus" ===
In 2001, Don decided to retire from LAB, and Matt Toronto left the band to pursue other projects. L.A.B. then recruited Dave and Ray from Zero Frequency to fill the missing spots in the band and continued on. In 2002, L.A.B decided to take a Vacation from their rigorous touring and writing schedule to "clear their heads and just breathe for a while". During this downtime, Kevin Baker formed The Mayan Factor with former L.A.B. webmaster, drummer Chuck Jacobs. Jason Fubler, Dave and Ray and formed Agents Of The Sun.

=== Reunited ===
The band played their second gig back together at the Portuguese Festival on June 10, 2006, in Newark, New Jersey. In February 2006, the band has promised a new full-length CD "ORDINARY" to be released on July 1, 2006. The record release will take place in Baltimore, MD at the club Sonar.

== Former and Current Lineup ==
- Rob Lasky: drums (member:1994 - 1997)
- Jason Fubler: Rhythm Guitar (member:1994 - 2002)
- Don DeOliveira: Lead Guitar/Vocals (member:1994–present)
- Kevin Baker: Bass guitar (member:1996–present)
- Jeff Jones: Lead Vocals/Rhythm Guitar (member:1994–present)
- Alan Cook: Bass guitar (member:1994 - 1996)
- Jerome Maffeo: drums (member:1997 - 2000)
- Matt Toronto: drums (member:2001–present)
- Mike "Bigga" Haight: Turntables/Samples and Programming (member:1997 - 2000)
- DJ Geoffro: Turntables/Samples and Programming (member:2001 - 2006)

== Influences ==
Alice in Chains, Limp Bizkit, Korn, Kid Rock, P.O.D., 311, Deftones, Incubus

== Discography ==
=== Full-length ===
Distant CD / LP (Monument Records 1996)

- Sometimes She Cries — Jealous — Leech — Triggerfinger — Wishing Well — Drop Me — Wrongman — Ditch Ritual — Breathe — Bloodstains — Dismal Morning — Admiration

Even Further CD / LP (Fowl 1999)

- Keeps Coming Down — Ring Around the Sun — Doubt — Better Way — Same as You — Piece of Heaven — Hourglass — DJ Bigga Jam '99 — Shame

Long Way Down CD / LP (Fowl 2001)

- Dirty — Considerate Apathy — Long Way Down — Leaving Heaven — Reinvent — Quiver — Never Be Mine — Bloodstains — Sometimes She Cries — Considerate Apathy (Feeling Low)

Ordinary CD / LP Mothership/Gig Records 2006

- Let It Go — Ordinary — Nevermine — Here On My Own — On and On — Weight of My Soul — The Rest of the World — The Meaning of Vain — When You're Gone — Who I Thought I'd Be — Every Time She Goes

== Trivia ==
Bassist Kevin Baker also was the head of Public Relations for Unsung Hero magazine.

== See also ==
List of HFStival acts
