= Citizen (album) =

Studio album by Army of Me
- Released: April 10, 2007
- Genre: Alternative rock, indie rock
- Length: 49:11
- Label: Doghouse Records
- Producer: Michael "Elvis" Baskette

Singles from Cityzen
- 1. "Going Through Changes" Released: 2007

Professional ratings
Review scores
Source	Rating
AbsolutePunk.net	(83%) link
AllMusic	link
Patrol Magazine	(6.7/10) link

Citizen is the debut full-length album by Army of Me. Its first single is "Going Through Changes", which appears on Burnout Dominator, Burnout Paradise, and MLB 06: The Show. The song "Better Run" is featured in ABC Family's Kyle XY in the episode "Primary Colors" originally aired on February 25, 2008.

== Track listing ==
All tracks are written by Army of Me.

No.	Title	Length
1.	"Perfect"	4:35
2.	"Going Through Changes"	4:06
3.	"Rise"	3:55
4.	"Meet You at the Mouth"	4:11
5.	"Still Believe in You"	4:16
6.	"Thinking It Over"	3:47
7.	"Better Run"	4:20
8.	"How Long"	3:36
9.	"Walking On"	4:32
10.	"2 into 1"	4:06
11.	"Saved Your Life"	3:43
12.	"Back to Business"	4:04
Total length:		49:11

== Personnel ==
- John Hutchins – bass (tracks 1, 2, 5)
- Tripper Ryder – bass
- Dennis Manuel – drums
- Brad Tursi – guitar, vocals
- Vince Scheuerman – guitar, piano, vocals
