= One by One (Agents of Good Roots album) =

Studio album by Agents of Good Roots
- Released: 1998
- Studio: A&M (Hollywood)
- Genre: Rock, pop
- Label: RCA
- Producer: Paul Fox

Agents of Good Roots chronology
Straight Around (1997)	One by One (1998)	Needle and Thread (2000)

One by One is an album by the American band Agents of Good Roots, released in 1998. It was the band's first album for a major label.

The album's first single was "Smiling Up the Frown". "Come On" peaked at No. 37 on Billboard's Modern Rock Tracks chart. One by One sold around 30,000 copies. The band supported it by touring with the Dave Matthews Band, and by playing the 1998 H.O.R.D.E. Festival.

== Production ==
The album was produced by Paul Fox. It was recorded at A&M Studios, in Los Angeles; the band brought in outside musicians to help flesh out its sound.

The raspy quality of singer Andrew Winn's voice was the result of a skiing accident that crushed his larynx.

== Critical reception ==
Professional ratings
Review scores
Source	Rating
AllMusic	4/5 stars
The Indianapolis Star	4/4 stars
MusicHound Rock: The Essential Album Guide	4/5 stars

The Washington Post thought that "sauntering pop-funk tracks like 'Upspin' don't sound like pale pretenders, while the neopsychedelic rock of 'Come On' is more gutsy than trippy." The Gazette opined that, "like fellow Virginians and neo-hippies the Dave Matthews Band, Agents of Good Roots put a raspy voice to an intricate rock/jazz backdrop, but their debut album, One by One, is peppier and rougher than the music of their statemates."

The Telegram & Gazette determined that, "despite stylistic twists and turns, Agents of Good Roots offers consistently solid songwriting." The Indianapolis Star concluded that the "mix of modern rock, punk, pop, soul, jazz and country is almost mind-boggling." The Philadelphia Inquirer stated that the band "trades in numbingly ordinary, undisciplined noodling."

AllMusic wrote that Agents of Good Roots "can write sturdy hooks, and there's an appealing party groove to the album that makes it a winning major-label debut." The Windsor Star listed One by One as the fourth best album of 1998, writing that it "combines the pop smarts of an R.E.M. with the adventurous spirit of a Steely Dan or Traffic."

== Track listing ==
No.	Title	Length
1.	"Come On"
2.	"Two Buck in Cash"
3.	"Miss America"
4.	"Upspin"
5.	"Miss Misbelieving"
6.	"Shortchange"
7.	"Smiling Up the Frown"
8.	"Time Bomb"
9.	"Hoping, Waiting, Longing"
10.	"Hobby"
11.	"Where'd You Get That Vibe?"
12.	"I'll Be Back"
