= Juniper Lane =

- Origin: Washington, D.C.
- Genres: Alternative
- Years active: 1998–present
- Members: Vivion; Chris; Freddy; Eddie; John
- Website: http://www.juniperlane.com/

Juniper Lane is a five-piece rock band from the Washington, DC area. The Washington Post has referred to Juniper Lane as "the total package," playing "polished, radio-ready rock." Washington, D.C.'s entertainment magazine, OnTap, described Juniper Lane's music as being "ready to kick radio and live ass."

The band was founded by vocalist/pianist, Vivion, and guitarist, Chris, who met in college at the University of Virginia and started writing music together after graduating and moving to Washington, D.C. Soon after, the band grew to include drummer Eddie, and bassist Freddy. In 2008, John joined the band. Their debut album, Counting, was released in 1999 and was followed up with Tightrope and Sirens From a Mile Back. Following the release of Sirens, Vivion was involved in a nearly fatal rock-climbing accident. After her recovery, Juniper Lane returned to the studio to record Wake From Yourself, which was released at a sold-out CD release show at the 9:30 Club in 2007.

In July 2008, Coldplay chose Juniper Lane to open for them at the Verizon Center in Washington, DC on August 3, 2008. In 2011, Juniper Lane released an EP of the opening set, showcasing the band's powerful live performance. The EP includes several stand out tracks from "Wake From Yourself," as well as a newly released B-Side, "Static," mixed by Paul David Hager.

As a result of the opportunity to open for Coldplay, famed mixer Michael Brauer (Coldplay, Paul McCartney, John Mayer, The Fray) mixed four new songs Juniper Lane recorded for their fifth album, "Standing on the White Line," with the final six songs of the record being mixed by Paul David Hager (Goo Goo Dolls, Jonas Brothers, Miley Cyrus) and Mitch Easter (R.E.M., Wilco, Suzanne Vega).. The band released the much anticipated "Standing on the White Line" on October 8, 2011.

Juniper Lane's music has been featured on MTV's The Hills, ESPN's Baseball Tonight and NCAA Women's Final Four Coverage. Their songs have also been added to SiriusXM Radio's Flight 26 and XMU channels and spun on commercial and college stations nationwide.

Juniper Lane has toured extensively on the East Coast, including shows at colleges, clubs, and venues such as the 9:30 Club, Recher Theatre, and DC's 99.1 HFStival, as well as performing in-studio for commercial radio and on live television. The band's song-writing has afforded them the opportunity to work with such industry professionals as mixer Michael Brauer, producer Ted Comerford (Zox, Army of Me), Joe Zook (Modest Mouse, Remy Zero, Liz Phair, Anna Nalick), Paul David Hager, and Mitch Easter (R.E.M., Wilco, Suzanne Vega).
