= Dead Heart Bloom =

American ambient rock band

Dead Heart Bloom is an ambient rock band based in New York City. Members include singer and bassist Boris Skalsky, guitarist Paul Wood and drummer Jason Molina. Both Skalsky and Wood were prior members of acclaimed Washington, D.C. newgaze rock outfit Phaser and Molina a former member of New York band Longwave. In 2011 Skalsky and Wood were also touring members of the band Skysaw, the project of former The Smashing Pumpkins drummer Jimmy Chamberlin. Molina rejoined Longwave in the fall of 2018 for a reunion tour and single release.

Dead Heart Bloom music has been used in a number of soundtracks. In 2011, their song "Someday Soon Our Time Will Come" was used in the independent film Friends with Kids.

Beginning in 2014 and through 2016 the band released a series of EPs and singles produced by Anthony Molina of Mercury Rev. In 2018 they self-released another EP, "State of Mind", on their own Ephemeral Arts label.

== Critical acclaim ==
- Rolling Stone lauded the band's EP Fall In in 2008.
- Dead Heart Bloom was featured on NPR's Open Mic and Second Stage.
- Under the Radar magazine picked Dead Heart Bloom as one of their "new artists to keep an eye on".
