= DC101 Chili Cook-Off =

Rock concert in Washington DC/Maryland

- Logo of the DC101 Chili Cook-Off
- Genre: Alternative rock
- Dates: Various
- Location: United States: Washington, D.C.
- Years active: 1979–2013
- Website: www.dc101chilicookoff.com

The DC101 Chili Cook-Off was an annual rock concert sponsored by Washington, D.C. / Baltimore, Maryland radio station WWDC (FM). Proceeds from the concert, traditionally held in Washington, D.C., in mid-to-late May, were donated to the National Capital Area chapter of the National Kidney Foundation. The name originates from the chili competition that used to occur during the event. Unlike what the name implies, some later events did not actually offer any chili, though in 2013 chili was offered in three different booths.

The main features of the event were a rock music concert, although vendors and sponsors also set up booths to form a temporary marketplace.

In its earlier years, the Cook-Off was often held at the intersection of K St. and Wisconsin Ave. in the Georgetown neighborhood of Washington, D.C., but later moved to the intersection of 12th St. and Pennsylvania Ave. After 9/11, security concerns forced the event to move to a series of nearby locations over the next several years. In 2007 and 2008, the Cook-Off was held at the Center City Lot, formerly the location of the Washington Convention Center. In 2009, for the first time, the Cook-Off was held at RFK Stadium.

The 2009 Chili Cook-Off attracted the largest crowd in the event's history, with 35,000 attendees.

== Music ==
The concert portion showcased the music of several modern rock acts, all performing on a single stage erected in the RFK stadium parking lot. Lineups for the concert were usually announced in late March or early April. In later years, a "Last Band Standing" competition was held to select a local group to open the show.

Some bands have performed at the festival during more than one year, including Downtown, Bird Dog Wheeler, Child's Play, emmet swimming, Seven Mary Three, Sponge, Jimmie's Chicken Shack, Finger Eleven, Puddle of Mudd, Carbon Leaf, Third Eye Blind, Rude Buddha, Switchfoot, Chevelle, Papa Roach, Cake, and Seether.

DC101 announced the Kerfuffle for 2014 at Merriweather Post Pavilion, but there was no mention of a 2014 Chili Cook-Off. The date of the DC101 Kerfuffle was May 3, around the time the Cook-Off is usually held. As of May 2024, no further Chili Cook-Offs have been announced or hosted.

== History ==
Date	Location	Musical acts
October 4, 1980	Rosecroft Raceway / Fort Washington, MD	
May 3, 1981	Rosecroft Raceway / Fort Washington, MD	
May 16, 1982	Prince George's Equestrian Center / Upper Marlboro, MD	The Silver Band, Largo High School Band
May 14, 1983	Prince George's Equestrian Center / Upper Marlboro, MD	
May 13, 1984	Rash Field / Baltimore, MD	
June 8, 1985	Hopkins Plaza / Baltimore, MD	
May 10, 1986	K St. and Wisconsin Ave. / Georgetown, Washington, D.C.	Lone Justice, Downtown
May 23, 1987	Broadway Square / Baltimore, MD	
May 20, 1989	K St. and Wisconsin Ave. / Georgetown, Washington, D.C.	The T-Birds, New Potato Caboose, Bird Dog Wheeler
May 19, 1990	K St. and Wisconsin Ave. / Georgetown, Washington, D.C.	The Fabulous Thunderbirds, Steve Smith and The Nakeds, Bird Dog Wheeler
May 18, 1991	K St. and Wisconsin Ave. / Georgetown, Washington, D.C.	Tommy Conwell and the Young Rumblers, Downtown, Child's Play
May 22, 1993	K St. and Wisconsin Ave. / Georgetown, Washington, D.C.	Blue Öyster Cult, Child's Play, Y-Not?
May 21, 1994	K St. and Wisconsin Ave. / Georgetown, Washington, D.C.	Kansas
May 20, 1995	K St. and Wisconsin Ave. / Georgetown, Washington, D.C.	Collective Soul, Eddie From Ohio, Sorry About Your Daughter
May 18, 1996	K St. and Wisconsin Ave. / Georgetown, Washington, D.C.	Spin Doctors, Dog's Eye View, Seven Mary Three, Toadies, The Badlees, The Emptys
May 17, 1997	12th St. and Pennsylvania Ave. / Washington, D.C.	Cracker, Cowboy Mouth, Sponge, Chalk FarM, Patti Rothberg, emmet swimming, Silverjet
May 30, 1998	12th St. and Pennsylvania Ave. / Washington, D.C.	Blink182, Everclear, Smash Mouth, Jimmie's Chicken Shack, Brother Cane, Mighty Joe Plum, Foam
May 22, 1999	12th St. and Pennsylvania Ave. / Washington, D.C.	Fuel, Sponge, Finger Eleven, The Flys, Virgos Merlot, Bare, Jr., emmet swimming
May 20, 2000	12th St. and Pennsylvania Ave. / Washington, D.C.	Goo Goo Dolls, Vertical Horizon, Our Lady Peace, Stroke 9, 8 Stops 7, Ebo
May 19, 2001	12th St. and Pennsylvania Ave. / Washington, D.C.	Train, Eve6, The Go-Go's, Seven Mary Three, Jimmie's Chicken Shack, Smartbomb
May 18, 2002	12th St. and Pennsylvania Ave. / Washington, D.C.	Soul Asylum, Puddle of Mudd, Something Corporate, Remy Zero, Sugarcult, Carbon Leaf, Pete Yorn, 2 Skinnee J's, Welbilt
May 17, 2003	12th St. and Pennsylvania Ave. / Washington, D.C.	Third Eye Blind, 3 Doors Down, Saliva, The Exies, Cold, Theory of a Deadman, Stage, Agents of the Sun
October 16, 2004	12th St. and Independence Ave. / Washington, D.C.	Cake, Jimmy Eat World, Switchfoot, The Donnas, Chevelle, Thousand Foot Krutch, The Speaks
May 14, 2005	12th St. and Independence Ave. / Washington, D.C.	Papa Roach, Chevelle, Trust Company, Carbon Leaf, Tony C. and the Truth, The Dan Band, Rude Buddha
May 20, 2006	12th St. and C St. / Washington, D.C.	Better Than Ezra, Hoobastank, Bloodhound Gang, Tonic, Smash-Up Derby, Rude Buddha, Everyone But Pete
May 12, 2007	Center City Lot / Washington, D.C.	Jet, Three Days Grace, Buckcherry, Breaking Benjamin, Silversun Pickups, The Bravery, Minus-One
May 10, 2008	Center City Lot / Washington, D.C.	Staind, Live, Seether, Finger Eleven, Chevelle, Deaf Pedestrians, The Blackjacks
May 16, 2009	RFK Stadium / Washington, D.C.	The Offspring, Third Eye Blind, Shinedown, Papa Roach, Puddle of Mudd, The Red Jumpsuit Apparatus, Niki Barr Band
May 22, 2010	RFK Stadium / Washington, D.C.	Stone Temple Pilots, Alice in Chains, Cage The Elephant, Switchfoot, Anberlin, Tears of Mars
May 21, 2011	RFK Stadium / Washington, D.C.	Weezer, Panic! at the Disco, Papa Roach, Seether, Neon Trees, Paper Tongues, Middle Class Rut
May 12, 2012	RFK Stadium / Washington, D.C.	Incubus, Cake, The Airborne Toxic Event, Awolnation, Neon Trees, Civil Twilight, Twin Atlantic
May 4, 2013	RFK Stadium / Washington, D.C.	Soundgarden, Awolnation, Silversun Pickups, Capital cities, Beware of Darkness, RDGLDGRN
