= Fowl Records =

- Founded: 1994
- Founder: Jimi Haha, Richard James Burgess, Chris Keith
- Status: Defunct
- Genre: Various
- Country of origin: United States
- Official website: https://fowl.com/

Fowl Records was co-founded in 1994 by Jimi Haha from Jimmie's Chicken Shack, Richard James Burgess, the band's manager (Burgess Worldco Inc.) and Chris Keith, the band's agent (Creative Booking International, Inc.) as a means to release Jimmie's Chicken Shack's first two independent CDs. Almost immediately it became the top indie label in the Mid-Atlantic region, specializing in alternative rock, punk, and jam bands. From 1998 to the closure of the label in 2002, Chris Smoker was the label manager.

== Releases ==
Fowl released the first three Jimmie's Chicken Shack recordings; being the cassettes Chicken Scratch in 1993 and Spit Burger Lottery in 1994, which were later put on one album called 2 For 1 Special. In 1995 a live album, Giving Something Back, was released. In 1996, Fowl incorporated and released An Udderly Fowl Release, a compilation featuring regional bands including the Kelly Bell Band, All Mighty Senators, Mary Prankster, and the unreleased Jimmie's Chicken Shack song, "Bongjam." There was a later compilation entitled A Family Fowlbum.

Fowl was not focused on a particular genre of music, but regarded by its founders as a development tool for local and regional bands in the Mid-Atlantic Music Scene, to gain exposure through Fowl's substantial local, regional and national distribution network. Also it was their online store, which was one of the first independent online music and music merchandise stores. The Fowl Records business model was built around grass roots and lifestyle promotion, leveraging mail and (early) email lists gleaned from the substantial fanbases the bands developed by playing as many shows as possible. Fowl sold hundreds of thousands and possibly millions of CDs through its own distribution network.

At its peak, Fowl was able to leverage its success and respect in the area by launching the local band stage, which was initially called "The Fowl Stage" at the HFStival. Several of the label's artists won Wammies from the Washington Area Music Association. In the days before the massive consolidation of radio properties, the programming staff at WHFS were supportive of Fowl Records, Jimmie's Chicken Shack and the label's other artists.

== Fowl bands ==
- All Mighty Senators
- Baltic Avenue
- Cactus Patch
- .click.
- Colouring Lesson
- Cubic Feet
- Doug Segree
- Epstein
- Fidel
- Imbue
- Jepetto
- Jimmie's Chicken Shack
- Julius Bloom
- Kelly Bell Band
- Laughing Colors
- Live Alien Broadcast
- Margret Heater
- Mary Prankster
- Rebel Amish Radio
- Rezin
- Spooky Daly Pride
- Supermack
- Underfoot
- Venus Sparkplug
- The Martians
- Jarflys

== See also ==
- List of record labels
