= Lloyd Dobler Effect =

Lloyd Dobler Effect was an American alternative rock band formed in 1995 in Silver Spring, Maryland, by Phil Kominski and Scott Shaw.

== Biography ==
Kominski and Shaw formed the band after leaving their high school band, STUFF. They brought in drummer Donnie Williams and took the name "Lloyd Dobler Effect", named after John Cusack's character in the film Say Anything..... The band performed alternative rock, sometimes combined with Latin rhythms, vocal harmonies and go-go percussion.

Between 2004 and 2012, the band performed over 250 gigs a year, often playing two per day in the summer. The band headlined three tours for the Armed Forces Entertainment, including trips to the Middle East and Asia. In 2002, they won the WHFS Big Break Competition to open the main stage at the 2002 WHFStival. In 2002, the band won a Kahunaville Battle of the Bands contest to open the main stage at The Molson Snow Jam in Boston, Massachusetts. In 2003, the band opened for the Goo Goo Dolls. In 2005, they signed with producer Gary Katz and Camille Barbone's record label, Wine Dark Records. In 2010, the band signed with Imagen Records.

Kominski was a sponsored artist of Elixir Strings from 2003. In November 2007, the band won a Battle of the Bands, which resulted in a sponsorship with Castle Brands.

Lloyd Dobler Effect broke up in 2019. Kominski and other former members of the band now perform as The Breakaways.

== Past band members ==
- Phil Kominski: Electric guitar, Acoustic Guitar, Lead Vocals. 1995 - 2019.
- Donnie Williams: Drums and Percussion. 1995 - 2019.
- Chris Bruno: Electric guitar, Mandolin, Vocals. 2004 - 2019.
- Javi Godinez: Violin, Vocals. 2000 - 2003.
- Rusty Williams: Auxiliary percussion, Congas and Bongos, Vocals. 1999 - 2010.
- Carlos Nalda: Auxiliary percussion, Congas and Bongos. 2010 - 2019.
- Patrick Hughes: Bass and Vocals. 2006 - 2019.
- Elizabeth Coyle Kominski: Vocals. 2002 - 2019.
- Rod Godinez: Bass and Vocals. 2000 - 2004.
- Kevin MacIntyre: Bass and Vocals. 1997 - 1999.
- Albert Ketler: Tenor Saxophone. 1995 - 2019.
- Doug Rock: Saxophone. 2003 - 2006.
- Scott Shaw: Bass and Vocals. 1995 - 1997.
- Johnny Castro: Bass. 2005 - 2006.
- Shane Gamble: Bass. 2004.
- Brian Buracker: Bass. 2004.
- David Wilmot: Bass. 1999 - 2000.
- Hope Isesele: Bass and Vocals. 1999 - 2000.
- Janelle Ragno: Cello. 1996 - 1998.
- Keith Ghion: Saxophone. 1996.
- John Reef: Keyboards. 1997.
- Russ Kaplan: Keyboards. 1997.
- Christian J. Schoenewald: Keyboards. 1999 - 2000.
- Katie Walsh: Keyboards and Vocals. 1997.
- Jacob Teichroew: Saxophone. 2000 - 2001.
- Colin Watson: Saxophone. 1999.
- Earl Miller: Keyboards. 1999 - 2000.
- Chuck Espinoza: Bass. 2004.
- Hank Upton: Bass. 2004.
- Josh Frizzel: Auxiliary percussion, Congas and Bongos, Vocals. 1996.
- Chris Brooks: Keyboards. 2009 - 2019.
- Brandon Van Epps: Saxophone. 1999.

== Albums ==
- The Sloth Cassette (1996)
- The Horizontal E.P. (1996)
- Drift (1998)
- The Hit & Run Studio Demos (1999)
- Ecstasy Sold Here (2001)
- The Mossman Sessions (2002)
- Ten Bucks And A Coke - Live (2003)
- Left Footprints (2003)
- Live 2004 (2004)
- Gary Katz Sessions (2005)
- Candles (2008)
- The Experience Unplugged (2010)
- A Mute Reminder (2010)
- The Holiday Experience (2011)
- The Irish Experience (2013)
- Rock N' Roll Gangstas (2014)
- Phil Kominski: Songs I Wrote and Recorded with Lloyd Dobler Effect, Remixed, Remastered and Unreleased (2020)
