= VooDoo Blue =

American alternative rock band

- Origin: Baltimore, Maryland, U.S.
- Genres: Alternative rock, pop punk
- Years active: 1997–2007; 2009
- Label: DCide
- Members: Dan Book (guitar, vocals); Clunky (bass, vocals); Justin Posner (drums)
- Past members: Mike Abrian (lead vocals); Brandon Walker (keyboards)
- Website: vdbmusic.com

VooDoo Blue was a rock/alternative band from Baltimore, Maryland, that featured Dan Book on vocals and guitar, Clunky on bass and vocals, Justin Posner on the drums, and originally, Mike Abrian on lead vocals. The band was formed in the late 1990s. Since the debut of their 2006 album Smile 'n' Nod, VooDoo Blue has released under the independent record label DCide. In 2004 VooDoo Blue opened for HFStival.

The band is known for their punk influences and lyrics tackling themes such as teen suicide, street mugging, and misspent youth. A video was created for “Bobby Know-It-All” the lead single of their 2006 album Smile 'n' Nod. Directed by Mr. Oz, the video takes visual inspiration from DC and Marvel Comics.

== Discography ==
- Watch the World Fall Down (2001)
- The Summer Sessions (2002)
- Use As Directed (2003)
- Loā (2004)
- Smile 'n' Nod (2007)

== Hiatus/Disbandment ==
On January 19, 2007, on their MySpace blog, the three members of VooDoo Blue collectively posted a memo that informed fans that they were officially on hiatus. The post also hinted at, but did not confirm, the band's possible future disbandment. In summer 2007, it was announced their final show would take place on August 25, 2007, at Recher Theatre in Towson, Maryland. The band re-united for one show in October 2009.
