= Tell Your Friends (Mary Prankster album) =

Studio album by Mary Prankster
- Released: September 7, 2002
- Genre: Rock
- Length: 31:15
- Label: Palace Coup Records
- Producer: Mitch Easter, Mary Prankster

Mary Prankster chronology
Blue Skies Forever (2002)	Tell Your Friends (2002)	Lemonade: Live (2004)

Professional ratings
Review scores
Source	Rating
Allmusic	3/5 stars

Tell Your Friends is the third and final album by Mary Prankster.

== Track listing ==
All songs by Mary Prankster

1. "Brave New Baby" – 2:51
2. "La Resistance" – 3:55
3. "Tell Your Friends (Part One)" – 2:43
4. "Sun" – 2:31
5. "Irresponsible Woman" – 2:50
6. "Arm's Length" – 3:56
7. "Spill" – 3:32
8. "None for Me" – 3:16
9. "Tell Your Friends (Part Deux)" – 2:47
10. "Darlin'" – 2:50

== Personnel ==
- Mary Prankster – vocals, guitar, chamberlin, cowbell
- Jon E. Cakes – bass guitar, organ, tambourine; lead guitar on "La Resistance"
- Phil Tang – drums, timpani, glockenspiel, marimba
- Mitch Easter – lead guitar, additional guitars, engineering
- Jon M. Thornton – horn arrangement, trumpet, flugelhorn
- Tim Gordon – clarinet, tenor sax
- Rick Blanc – trombone, bass trombone
- Cliff Retallick – piano
- The Baltimore Sound Machine – additional percussion on "Spill"
- Mark Williams – engineering
