= Jah Works =

American roots reggae band

- Origin: Baltimore, MD, USA
- Genres: Reggae
- Years active: 1993 – present
- Label: Riddim House Productions
- Members: Michael Hamilton; Kevin Gorman; Scott Paynter; Natty Roc; Brian Gorman; Jonathan Pang; Chuck Reggae
- Past members: Eric Vincent, Tony Love, Dan Lowe, Ellis Baylor, Cliff Darrow, George Penn
- Website: http://www.jahworks.com/

Jah Works is a roots reggae band from Baltimore, Maryland. They have been a member of the Armed Forces Entertainment (AFE) since 2002. Since that time, they have travelled and performed in Hawaii, The Marshall Islands, Guam, South Korea, Japan, Singapore and Diego Garcia in 2004. Their most recent AFE tour ended in February 2007. On this tour they played for U.S. troops stationed in Kuwait, Qatar, Djibouti, United Arab Emirates, Bahrain and Saudi Arabia.

== Founding ==
The band was formed by Loyola College in Maryland students while studying abroad in Belgium. Their name comes from the song Jah Works by the reggae group The Gladiators.

== Discography ==
=== Studio albums ===
- Feast Or Famine (1994)
- Send The Rain (1996)
- Taking Off Tomorrow (1998)
- Bassmentality (2001)
- Hard To Find (2005)
- One For You (2007)
- Rewind (2009)
- Believe (2016)
- River of Life (2026)

=== Live albums ===
- Live Vol. 1 (1999)
- Live Vol. 2 (2003)
