= Trik Turner =

American rap rock band

- Origin: Phoenix, Arizona, U.S.
- Genres: Rap rock; alternative rock; nu metal
- Years active: 1999–present
- Labels: RCA, Metal Action
- Members: Doug Moore; Sean Garden; Chris Bandusky; James Cawley; Jonathan Kingsley

Trik Turner is an American rap rock band formed in Phoenix, Arizona in 1999. The band is best known for their song "Friends and Family", which reached the top ten on the Billboard Modern Rock chart and received significant airplay on MTV, VH1 and adult contemporary television and radio formats in 2002. They were the first band to ever have two different videos aired on MTV for the same song, "Friends and Family". One mentioning daughters, and one mentioning sons. They made appearances on Late Show with David Letterman, Last Call with Carson Daly, Late World with Zach and The Late Late Show with Craig Kilborn. "Friends and Family" was also featured on the Mr. Deeds film soundtrack and in the third episode of the sitcom Scrubs's seventh season, while the group's song "Black Sheep" was featured in the film, You Got Served. Although they were to go back into the studio, differences among band members led some to part ways. The band was dropped from RCA Records. They continued to tour and released a second album via their website, Naming the Unidentified, in 2005, composed of alternative rock songs lacking the nu metal element.

== Members ==
=== Current members ===
- Doug Moore – vocals (1999–present)
- Sean Garden – drums (1999–present)
- Chris Bandusky – guitars (2004–present)

=== Former members ===
- Dave Bowers – vocals, producer (1999–2005)
- Coney Huhn – bass, guitars (2000–2002)
- Tracy Thorstad – guitars (1999–2005)
- Danny 'DBX' Marquez – turntables (1999–2005)
- Mike Nicolette – bass (2004–2006)
- General Fisher – bass (interim)
- Steve Faulkner – bass (2002–2004)

== Discography ==
=== Studio albums ===
- Trik Turner (2002)
- Naming the Unidentified (2005)

=== Demo albums ===
- Black Seas and Brown Trees (1999)

=== Singles ===
- "Friends and Family" (2002)
- "Sacrifice" (2002)
