= Jepetto =

American rock band

- Origin: Annapolis, Maryland, United States
- Genres: Alternative rock Rap rock Funk
- Years active: 1994-2004, 2022-
- Label: Fowl Records
- Past members: Chris "Kahz" Cosgrove; Dan Marcellus; Dave Richardson; Chris "FC" Hartman; Jesse Hosch; Larry Byrne

Jepetto was a band from 1994 to 2004 from Annapolis, Maryland. The band was managed by Adam Wheatley of Funkstarr. After the band's split, core members, Chris Cosgrove, David Richardson, and Chris Hartman formed Victory Party with Casey Hean, Ben Frock, and Carl Jenson.

The band debuted at the 1996 Annapolis High School talent show. In 2000, they won the WHFS contest to be the opening band for the HFStival.

They reunited in 2022.

== Lineup ==
- Chris "Kahz" Cosgrove — vocals
- Dan Marcellus — drums
- Dave Richardson — vocals, percussion
- Chris "FC" Hartman — bass
- Jesse Hosch — guitar
- Larry Byrne — keyboards

== Discography ==
=== Albums ===
12:33 CD / LP (Funkstarr Records, 1999)

- Drip — Human — Groove Juice — Smack Doo Doo — Urge — One Way — Generation X — Cheeba — Jesse's Song — Underground — Timbuk — Deciding Where the World Begins — It's About Time

Inkbox CD / LP (Fowl Records, 2002)

- Faders — Better Off — Destroyer — Caleco — Dynamite Team — One Way — Eleven — Faceless — Complications — Old-balls

=== EPs ===
Mung Sessions

=== Compilations ===
Penthouse on Sunset Vol. 2 CD / LP (2000)

== See also ==
- List of HFStival acts
