= Phaser (band) =

American musical band

Phaser was a Washington, D.C. band that wrote, performed and recorded from 1998 to 2005. They released four records including Silverscreen Daydream (1998), Skydive (2000), Sway (2001) and Sleeper (2005). Their record Sway was re-released in 2003 on Emperor Norton Records. Their last EP, Sleeper was released in 2005. Former Phaser singer, bassist, and keyboardist Boris Skalsky founded his own band Dead Heart Bloom in 2005. Dead Heart Bloom has since released three records and a series of EPs. Boris Skalsky has also released two solo records, First Songs and Forever and a Day. A classically trained musician, Skalsky has also released music focused on his instrumental, film, and TV work. Phaser guitarist Paul Wood joined Dead Heart Bloom in 2008. Phaser keyboardist and singer Mike Reina has started a band with Jimmy Chamberlin of The Smashing Pumpkins named Skysaw. Paul Wood and Boris Skalsky are also members of Skysaw. Siayko Skalsky guitar, keyboard and vocalist went on to create a new band Gun, which consisted of members of Canyon and Tone. He also worked on TV music projects with Greg Clark of Harmonia Studios and the band Pull, which was the original title track for Duck Commander.

== Critical acclaim ==
- NPR named Phaser's release, Sway in the Best CDs of 2003.
- Rolling Stone magazine praised the band's release Sway in a 2003 review.

== Discography ==
Studio albums

- Silverscreen Daydream (1998)
- Sway (2003)

Singles and EPs

- Skydive EP (2000)
- Sleeper EP (2005)

Compilations

- DCide: The 40 (1999) - Contributed One Trip Away
