= Agents of Good Roots =

American rock band

- Origin: Richmond, Virginia
- Genre: Rock
- Years active: 1995–2006, 2017–present
- Label: RCA Records
- Members: Brian Jones, J. C. Kuhl, Stewart Myers, Andrew Winn

Agents of Good Roots is an American rock band from Richmond, Virginia.

== History ==
The group formed in 1995 and toured heavily on college campuses in the middle of the decade. They independently released two records before signing to RCA Records, after which they toured with Dave Matthews Band and scored two rock radio hits, "Come on" and "Smiling Up the Frown". The band recorded a single music video, entitled "Come On (Let Your Blood Come Alive)", in 1998 that was paired with the release of their RCA album, One by One. It was played briefly on MTV during the summer months of 1998. The band went dormant in 2006, but reunited for several live shows in 2017, with plans to tour and record in 2018. They also launched a new website.

== Members ==
- Brian Jones – drums & vocals
- J. C. Kuhl – saxophone
- Stewart Myers – bass guitar & vocals
- Andrew Winn – vocals, guitar, & keyboards

Past members

- Kevin Hamilton – bass
- Rick Rieger – saxophone

== Discography ==
=== Studio albums ===
- Where'd You Get That Vibe? (1996)
- Straight Around (1997)
- One by One (RCA Records, 1998) U.S. Heatseekers #44 Produced by Paul Fox and Mixed by Tom Lord-Alge
- Needle and Thread (ATO Records, 2000)

=== Extended plays ===
- Seed (EP) (2000)

=== Singles ===
- "Smiling Up the Frown" (1998) U.S. Adult Alternative Songs No. 5
- "Come On (Let Your Blood Come Alive)" (1998) U.S. Modern Rock Tracks No. 37
- "Miss Misbelieving" (1998)
- "Upspin" (1998) U.S. Adult Alternative Songs No. 15
- "Bomb Silo" (2019) digital
- "Miguel and the Bull" (2020) digital
- "Blood Brothers" (2020) digital
- "You Come Runnin’" (2020) digital
