= Solution A.D. =

- Solution A.D., 1994

Background information
- Also known as: Solution
- Origin: East Stroudsburg, Pennsylvania
- Genres: Alternative rock
- Years active: 1993-1998
- Labels: TAG Recordings; Atlantic Records
- Past members: Kevin Leggieri; Toby Costa; M.J. Law; David Currier; Mike Hoover

Solution A.D. was an American rock band from East Stroudsburg, Pennsylvania.

The band was initially named Solution, and appended the "A.D." after discovering that another group with the same name already existed. The group was noticed by Live guitarist Chad Taylor at a performance at CBGB, and he signed on to produce their debut EP, which was released in 1996. The group issued a full-length album soon after on Atlantic Records and toured widely behind it. The single "Fearless", taken from the full-length album, received airplay on MTV and reached No. 33 on the Billboard Modern Rock charts in 1996; it was the group's only hit.

== Discography ==
- twentynothing (1994)
- A Week There One Night (1996)
- Happily Ever After (1996)

== Members ==
- Kevin Leggieri - bass
- Toby Costa - vocals
- M.J. Law - drums
- David Currier - keyboards and trombone
- Mike Hoover - guitar
