= Winter Hours (band) =

American alternative rock band

- Origin: Lyndhurst, New Jersey, United States
- Years active: 1983–1991
- Labels: Chrysalis
- Past members: Michael Carlucci; Stanley Demeski; Joe Marques; Bob Messing; Bob Perry; John Albanese; Frank Giannini; Dave Scheff; Steve Lepore
- Website: www.myspace.com/winterhours

Winter Hours were one of New Jersey's leading alternative rock bands. They were formed as an evolution of another, short-lived band named Ward 8 in 1983. They released two albums and four EPs and toured incessantly before disbanding in 1991. In 1989, their song "Smoke Rings" peaked at number 12 on Billboard's Modern Rock Tracks chart.
