= Niki Barr =

American musician

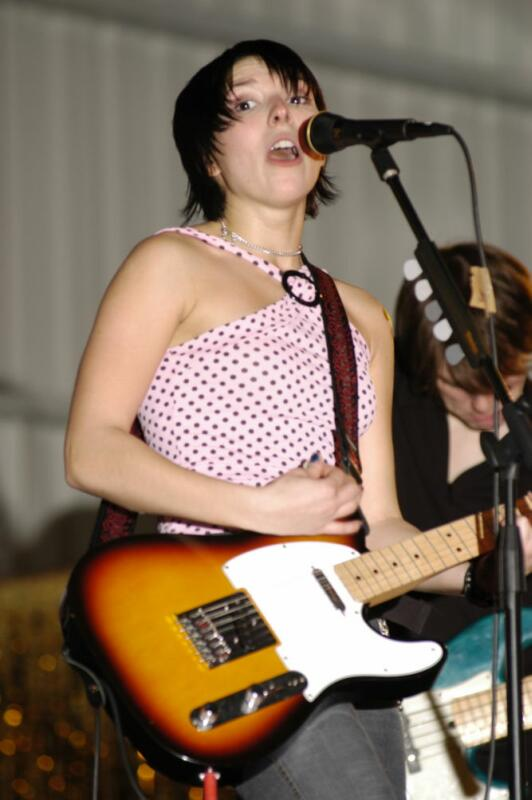
- Barr in 2003

Background information
- Origin: Denton, Maryland, U.S.
- Website: thelastyear.net

Niki Barr is an American musician from Denton, Maryland. Starting in 2013, she is the lead singer for The Last Year, a Baltimore, Maryland-based alternative band.

== Career ==
=== Early years ===
Niki began writing, performing, and recording at age 15 and soon after, began working with Mike Marucci of Marucci Artist Management, Inc. He introduced Niki to producer, Jim Ebert. Jim and Niki worked together on her records The Other Side of Me EP, Lush, and Go EP. Lush (2005) was Niki's first full-length record and included songs co-written with Butch Walker, The Matrix (record production team), Wizardz of Oz, Matthew Gerrard, and Stephen Lironi. The single "Wasted Time" became the #1 single on Sky Radio in the UK for over 6 weeks. Soon after, Go was released as an EP, and it managed to sit atop Sky Radio for over 8 weeks in the UK.

=== Niki Barr Band ===
Through her manager and friends, Niki joined forces with guitarist Island Styles, bassist Scott Von Ensign, and drummer BJ Kerwin to form Niki Barr Band. Together, the band wrote, recorded, and produced their Bloom EP (2008). The band's follow up album, entitled "Radar Radio", was released in 2010.

In 2012, the band released a cover of the Nine Inch Nails song "Closer". The accompanying music video was the first ever created by the band. As of March 2020, the video has over 76,000 views on YouTube.

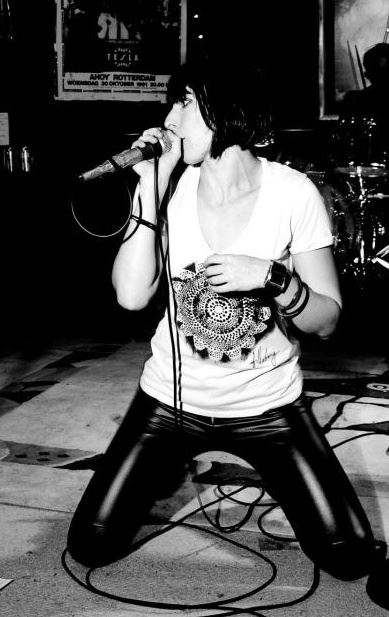
Barr performing live in concert

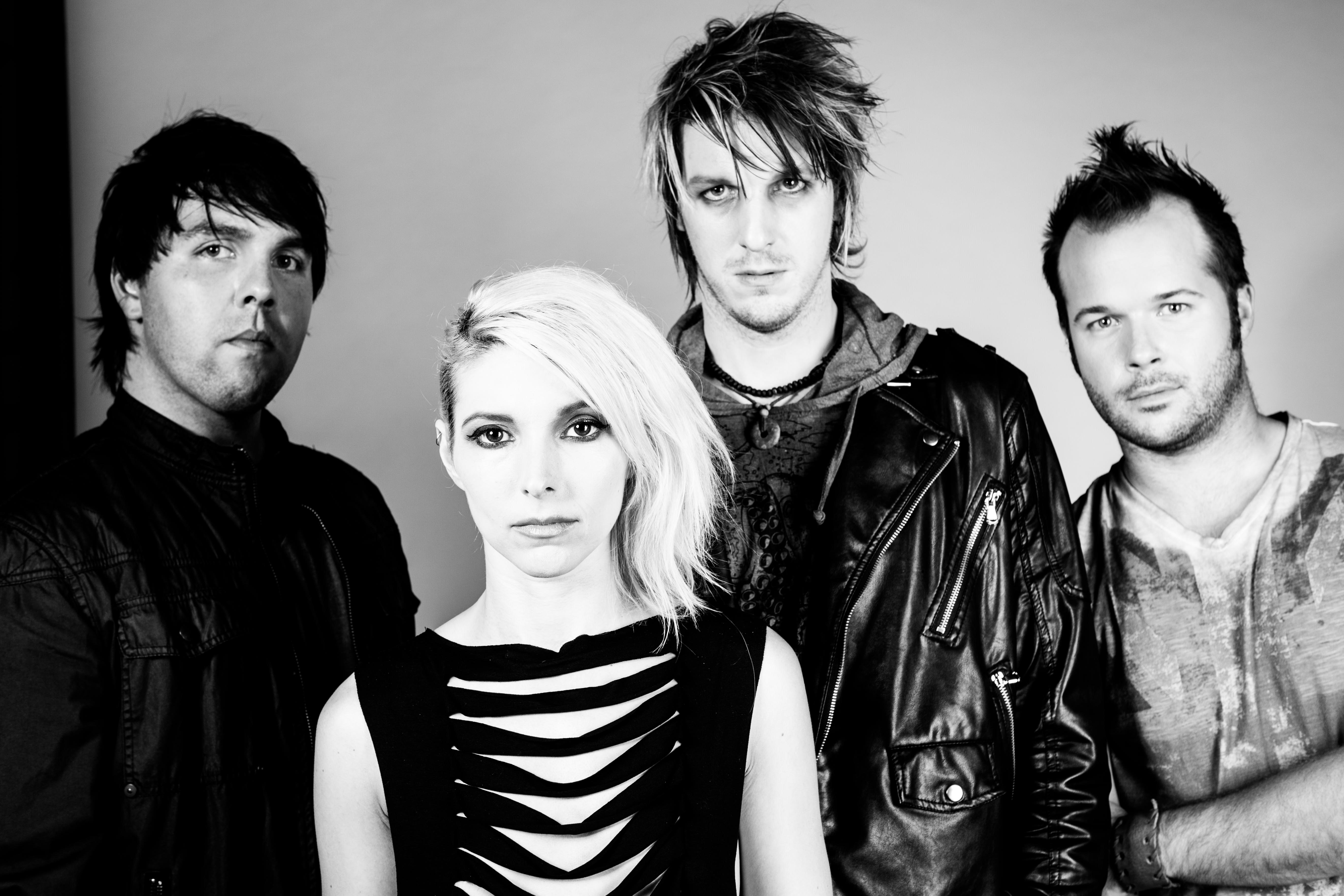
Photo of members of The Last Year

=== The Last Year ===
In June 2013 Niki Barr and bandmate Scott Von Ensign formed "The Last Year". The duo was signed to a contract with Shanachie Entertainment, home to such artists as Rusted Root, Leela James, and the Flobots. A five-song EP was released on August 13, 2013. The first single from the EP, "Sugar", was released in July 2013. The band made its public debut on July 12, 2013, at The Ottobar in Baltimore, Maryland.

In November 2013, The Last Year was named the 98 Rock Band of The Month by a local Baltimore radio station. and covered in Shockwave Magazine

The band released a video featuring an acoustic version of their debut single "Sugar" on YouTube in February 2014. The video was reviewed by Guitar World, who described it as "...a haunting little number that showcases some great songwriting.". Later that year, the single was featured on the soundtrack of the first season of MTV's House of Food on episode 7, entitled "Sweet Relief".

The second single, "Mania", was released in February 2015 in advance of their next studio album. In support of the album, they toured throughout the year, including a performance at the 2015 South by Southwest Festival in Austin, Texas, where they were named one of the "Austin 100." The band performed with Sick of Sarah during their 2015 tour.

"Mania" entered into Top 40 songs by Double Neuve FM 99 Peru on June 13, 2015. The song was ranked at number 20 on the Top Notch Top 25 Best Songs of 2015.

The band's next album, entitled Static Automatic, was released in March 2016. The band toured extensively in support of the album, including an appearance at Summerfest 2016 in Milwaukee, WI. They also performed at the National Park Service Centennial Celebration in Washington, D.C., on August 25, 2016.

On August 15, 2017, the band released the single, "Right Where You Want Me", on SoundCloud. It is the first track from the second full-length record, Timebombs, which was released on April 6, 2018.

=== Touring ===
Niki Barr Band completed 12 international tours in 5 years with Armed Forces Entertainment (AFE), performing for US Troops in the Middle East, Japan, UK, and many other countries throughout Europe and Southeast Asia. The tours spanned 40 countries across 3 continents and brought the band support from Billboard Magazine, Rolling Stone Magazine, The Wall Street Journal, Time Magazine, and NPR Radio's "Border Crossings with Larry London." April 30, 2009, Niki Barr Band won radio station DC101's "Last Band Standing" competition, granting them the opening spot of the DC101 Chili Cook-Off concert at RFK Stadium May 16, 2009, supporting bands Third Eye Blind, Papa Roach, and The Offspring.

The first AFE overseas tour went to Japan, Diego Garcia, and Singapore in 2003. Niki's most extensive tour was in late 2005, which involved seven countries. Countries she's performed in include Afghanistan, Bahrain, Djibouti, Saudi Arabia, Kuwait, Kyrgyzstan, Turkey, and United Arab Emirates. In March–April 2007, the band returned to the same theater for another AFE sponsored tour.

Niki Barr Band was a headliner on the annual ShipRocked rock festival and music cruise, featured 2009 and invited to return 2010; the band appeared both years.

The band has shared stages with Joan Jett, Paramore, The Offspring, The Cult, Papa Roach, Shinedown, Puddle of Mudd, Third Eye Blind, The Red Jumpsuit Apparatus, Crossfade, Sevendust, Vince Neil, The GoGos, Tesla, Charm City Devils, and many other notable marquee acts.

Niki has also worked locally with United Service Organizations (USO) of Metropolitan Washington, D.C.

== Clothing Line ==
Niki created her own clothing line, Neurotica, in 2005. Neurotica is a licensed and registered trademark of Niki Barr Enterprises, LLC.

== Discography ==
- Timebombs ©2018
  - Produced by The Last Year
  1. Right Where You Want Me
  2. Annabelle
  3. Bad Things
  4. Failing
  5. Drown With Me
  6. Promise
  7. Jealousy
  8. Through The Heart
  9. Dead
  10. The Beyond
  11. Timebombs
  12. Confidence
- Right Where You Want Me ©2017
  - Produced by The Last Year
- Static Automatic ©2016
  - Produced by The Last Year
  1. Mania
  2. Rush
  3. Dark Ages
  4. Silhouette
  5. Magic
  6. Chemical
  7. Static Automatic
- The Last Year ©2013
  - Produced by The Last Year
  1. Not The One
  2. Sugar
  3. Imagining
  4. Kill Me Now
  5. Flying
- Closer ©2012
  - Produced and Mixed by Niki Barr Band
- Radar Radio ©2010
  - Produced and Mixed by Niki Barr Band with assistance from Bret Alexander at Obscura Sound
  1. Sex Friend
  2. Worry
  3. Ghosts
  4. Surrender
  5. Enemy
  6. Fallen
  7. Miles Away
  8. Lips Like Crucifix
  9. Enough
  10. Love Yourself
- Bloom ©2008 EP
  - Produced and Mixed by Niki Barr Band at Obscura Sound
  - Mastered by Bruce Kane
  1. Undivided
  2. Alone
  3. So Cruel
  4. Burn
  5. Drowsy
- Go ©2006 EP
  - Produced and Mixed by Jim Ebert
  - Co-writes with Ed Tuton and Butch Walker
  1. Go
  2. Cigarette Lighter Love Song
  3. Stick It
  4. If
  5. Wrong Way
- Lush ©2005
  - Produced and Mixed by Jim Ebert
  - Co-writes with Butch Walker and Bruce Brody
  1. Wasted Time
  2. Nothing At All
  3. Holiday
  4. Leave It Alone
  5. Used To Be
  6. Memories of Last Year
  7. Sooner Or Later
  8. So Far Away
  9. Getaway
  10. Such A Fool
  11. Inside Looking Out
  12. My Breathing Heart
- The Other Side of Me ©2003 EP
  - Produced by Jim Ebert
  - Engineered by Rick Isaac
  - All songs Mixed and Mastered by Jim Ebert
  1. Just Like You
  2. Today
  3. Bottom Row
  4. Run To Me
  5. Sugar Coated
  6. Until I See You Again
  7. Faulty
- No Frills ©2001
  - Acoustic album recorded in Niki's bedroom
  1. Sugar Coated
  2. One So Fine
  3. Intoxicated
  4. With You
  5. Speak
  6. Bottom Row
  7. Incognito
  8. Human Eye
  9. Second Time Around
  10. Give Enough

Niki Barr provides the vocals for the theme song for the crime re-enactment show "Scorned: Love Kills" on the Investigation Discovery channel.
