= Mary Prankster =

American singer-songwriter

- Origin: Annapolis, Maryland, United States
- Genres: Cowpunk
- Years active: 1994–2005, 2017–present
- Labels: Fowl Records; Palace Coup Records
- Website: maryprankster.com

Mary Prankster is the moniker for an American singer-songwriter. She is primarily associated with Baltimore (but now residing in New England), and played a blend of alternative/indie music with frank lyrics. The name is a reference to Ken Kesey's Merry Pranksters. After over 1,000 live performances, the Mary Prankster character was retired over "Pranksgiving Weekend" (November 25–28, 2005); the woman behind Mary continues to work on other creative projects.

The musicians who have played in her band include Phil "The Machine" Tang, Jon "E. Cakes" Seidman, Dave "E. Rocket" Vergauwen, Mike Lackey, Cord Neal, Matt Collorafice, Terry Klawth, Andy Mabe, Cliff Retallick, Sam McCall and Michael Smith.

== Life and career ==
Her first radio single was "Tits and Whiskey" from the album Blue Skies Over Dundalk (produced by Steve Wright of Wright Way Studios in Baltimore), a 1:40 song which she called "my attempt at writing the most obnoxious song ever", and which contained the word "fuck" thirteen times. This did not stop local radio station WHFS from playing the song daily for several weeks. WHFS also arranged for her to play a free roadside show on the Baltimore–Washington Parkway that was quickly shut down by the police due to the traffic back-ups that it created and landed her a spot opening for They Might Be Giants at a sold-out show in Washington, DC, the singer having been banned from playing clubs in her hometown of Annapolis due to controversial lyrics.

Following the release of Roulette Girl (produced by Rennie Grant and recorded by Steve Wright), she left Fowl Records to create Palace Coup Records (PCR). Roulette Girl was re-released by PCR, while Blue Skies Over Dundalk was combined with the Mata Hari EP and a bonus track to create the album Blue Skies Forever in 2001.

That same year she recorded the "Love Has a Rumble" single with Baltimore rock-reggae band Colouring Lesson. The single was released to international and domestic radio stations.

In 2002 she recorded Tell Your Friends with producer Mitch Easter (R.E.M., Pavement) at The Fidelitorium in Kernersville, North Carolina. The album was mixed by Shelly Yakus (Tom Petty, U2) and made the CMJ charts due to extensive nationwide college radio play. Prankster recruited North Carolina musicians Andy Mabe (Neko Case, Clare Fader) and Terry Klawth (Jodie Foster's Army, Mighty Sphincter) for the Tell Your Friends tour which culminated in a recorded performance at Washington, DC's 9:30 Club that became the 2004 release Lemonade: LIVE.

In 2004 the entire Mary Prankster catalog, including singles, became available on iTunes and other digital music sites.

In 2005, she retired the name Mary Prankster, moved to New York and did voice-over work for TV commercials. She went back to school and moved to New England.

In 2016, she reconnected with Baltimore producer Steve Wright, and they agreed to work on a new album, Thickly Settled, released in November 2019.

In 2017 she made her live return by playing two live shows for Pranksgiving weekend.

Comedy Dynamics acquired and will release Mary Prankster's musical comedy special, Mary Prankster: LIVE at the Ottobar, recorded in November 2017 in Baltimore.

The Washington Area Music Association (WAMA) has nominated her for nine Wammies, two of which she won – Best Alternative Female Vocalist in 1999 and Best Alternative Rock Female Vocalist in 2000. Blue Skies Forever also won second place in the Just Plain Folks 2006 Music Awards Punk Album category. Her music has been promoted by Dr. Demento, and she has also enjoyed heavy rotation on the Red Peters show on Sirius Satellite Radio.

Her logo is based on that of National Bohemian, a Maryland beer. The cover of Blue Skies Over Dundalk is based on can designs of "Natty Boh", and Roulette Girl contains a track named "Rational Bohemian". The cover of Roulette Girl features a plate-spinning performer from the People's Circus of China, the cover of Tell Your Friends is a vintage image of a telephone operator licensed from the Seattle Historical Society, and the cover of Lemonade: LIVE is an homage to Country Time lemonade.

== Discography ==
=== Albums ===
- Blue Skies Over Dundalk, Fowl Records (May 1998)
- Roulette Girl, Fowl Records (November 24, 1999) — re-released by Palace Coup Records (2001)
- Tell Your Friends, Palace Coup Records (September 7, 2002)
- Lemonade: Live, Palace Coup Records (April 1, 2004)
- Thickly Settled, Palace Coup Records (2019)

=== Others ===
- Mata Hari EP, self-released cassette (1996)
- "Angel", as "Neoverse featuring Mary Prankster" (c. 1998)
- "Love Has a Rumble", Palace Coup Records (April 14, 2001)
- Blue Skies Forever, Palace Coup Records (July 31, 2002)

== See also ==
- List of HFStival acts
