= The Ottobar =

Music venue in Baltimore, Maryland, US

Coordinates: 39.318802°N 76.619511°W

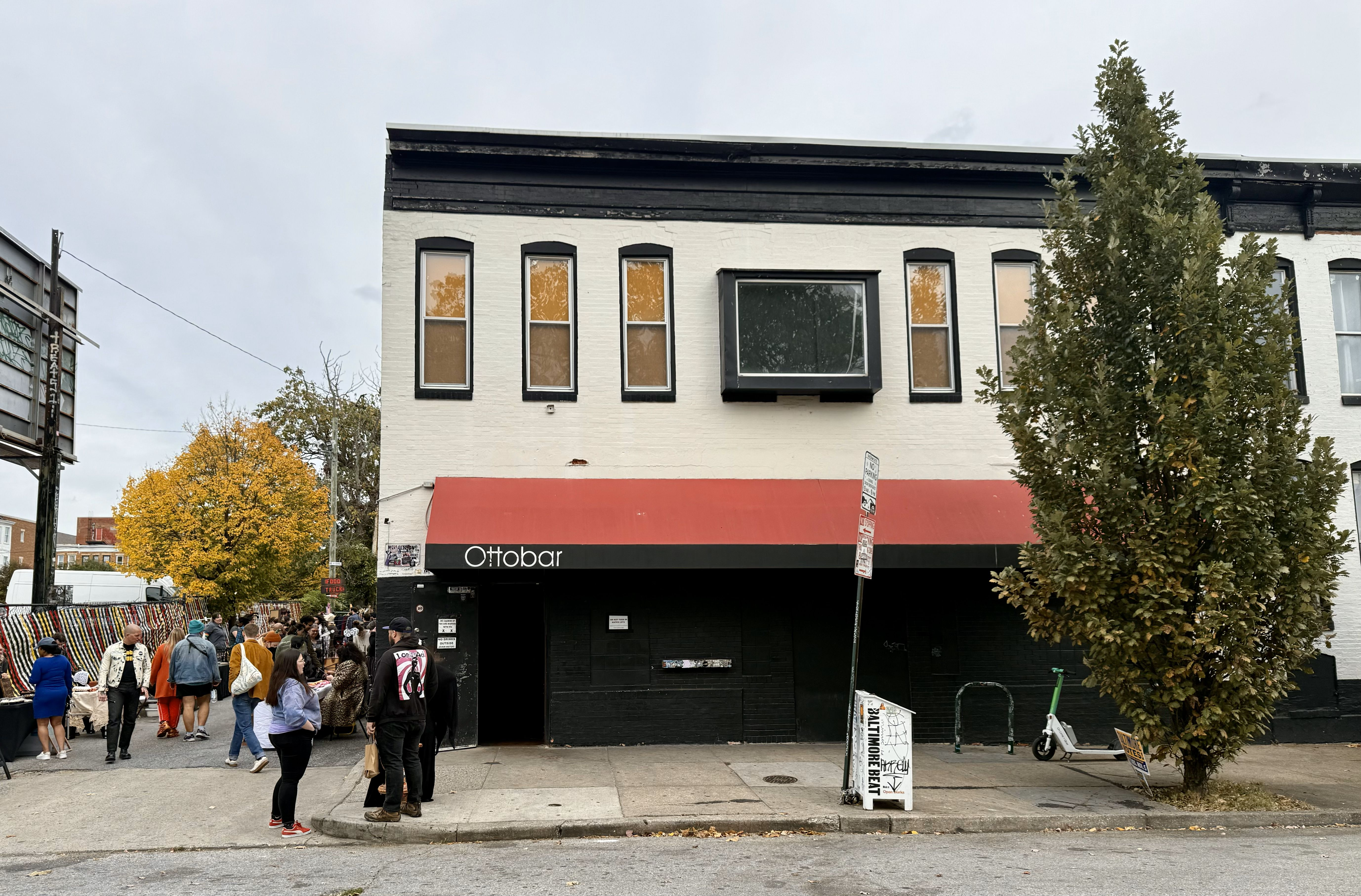
- Outside the Ottobar in late October 2024
- Interactive map of The Ottobar
- Location: 2549 North Howard Street, Baltimore, Maryland 21218
- Type: Music venue

Construction
- Opened: 1997

Website
- http://www.theottobar.com

The Ottobar is a music venue in the Charles Village neighborhood of Baltimore, Maryland, in the United States. In 2018 the Ottobar was named one of the 10 best live music venues in America by Rolling Stone magazine. The Washington Post describes it as a "bastion of sub-mainstream music ... where the insular community of artists and scenesters flock to hear the best touring bands." It also hosts theme events, dance parties, and an occasional burlesque show.

== History ==
Long considered one of the top music venues and one of the top indie and alternative music venues in Baltimore, Maryland, the Ottobar was opened in Downtown Baltimore by Michael Bowen, Todd Burger and Gillian Gabrielle in September 1997. It was originally located at 203 East Davis Street in the former Chambers Nightclub. The venue, which was named after Bowen's cat, Otto, was very small, providing an intimate setting for live music and performance art. Despite its size, it attracted national acts such as Blonde Redhead, Bright Eyes, Death Cab for Cutie, Fear, Jimmy Eat World, Lamb of God, Le Tigre, of Montreal, Queens of the Stone Age, Spoon, the Rapture, and the White Stripes. It also supported local artists of the time, such as Daybreak, Goliath, Lungfish, Oxes, the Goons, and the Oranges Band. The Ottobar has booked more than 12,000 acts since it opened rein 1997. Performance art showcased included The 80's Prom, Salute To Satan, Tiny Couch Night, and The Death of Vaudeville Night. The Davis Street location closed on November 17, 2001.

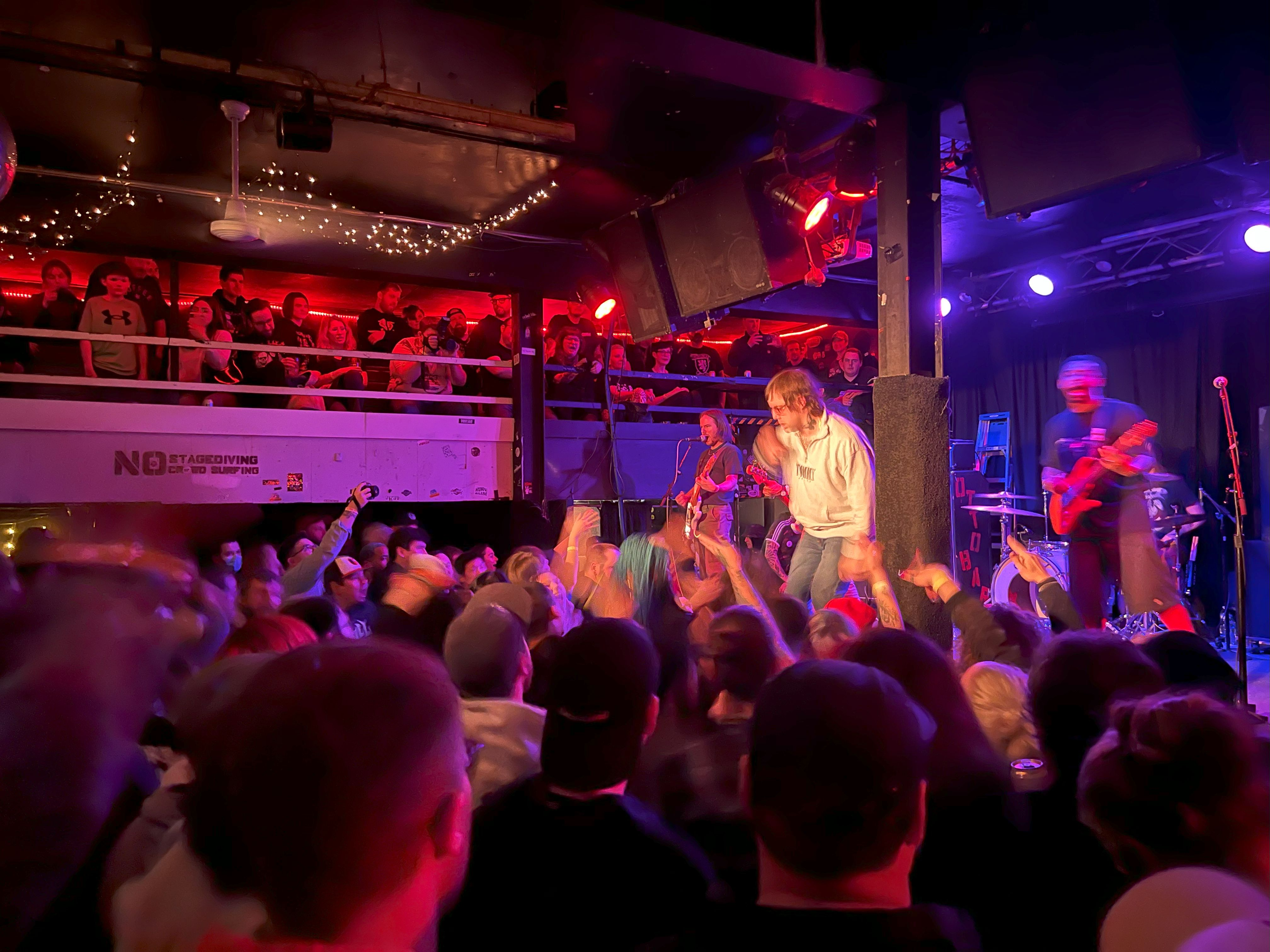
Angel Dust performing at the Ottobar in 2023

The Ottobar reopened the same month at its current 2549 North Howard Street location in lower Charles Village, south of the Johns Hopkins University campus and the Baltimore Museum of Art with owner Michael Bown and new partners Craig Boarman and Brian Deran. The Charles Village location is considerably larger, but still provides an intimate listening experience by permitting fans to be close to the bands. The venue is valued by artists for its clientele and sound system. Food is not served at the Ottobar. There is a bar and concert area on the main floor, a balcony with seating and a good view of the first floor, and an area for dance parties on the second floor. The second floor also has pool tables, a sofa, a small performance space, and a bar. It has been reported that there is a secret passage to the apartment next door which functions as the dressing room.

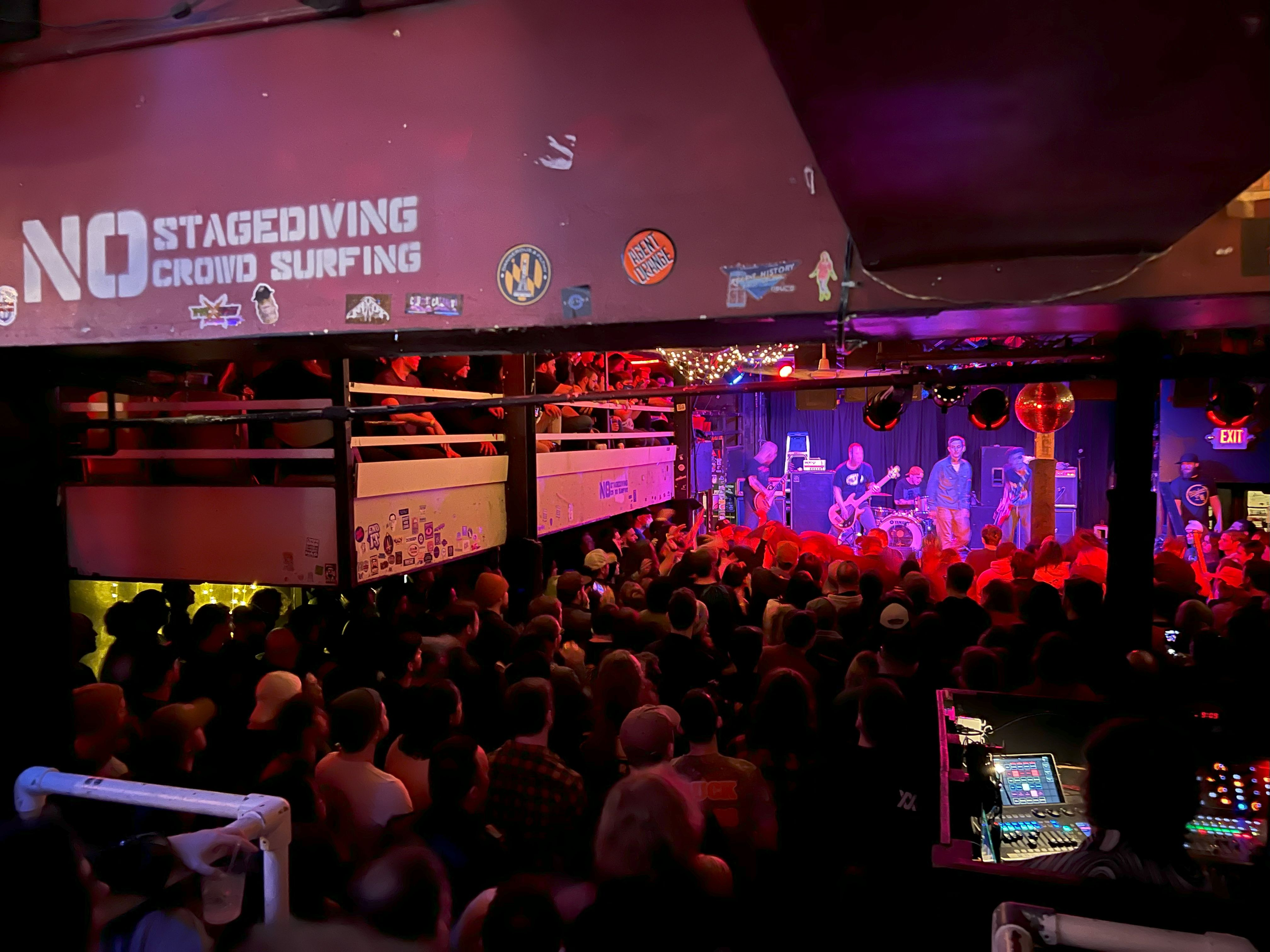
Drug Church performing at the Ottobar in 2023

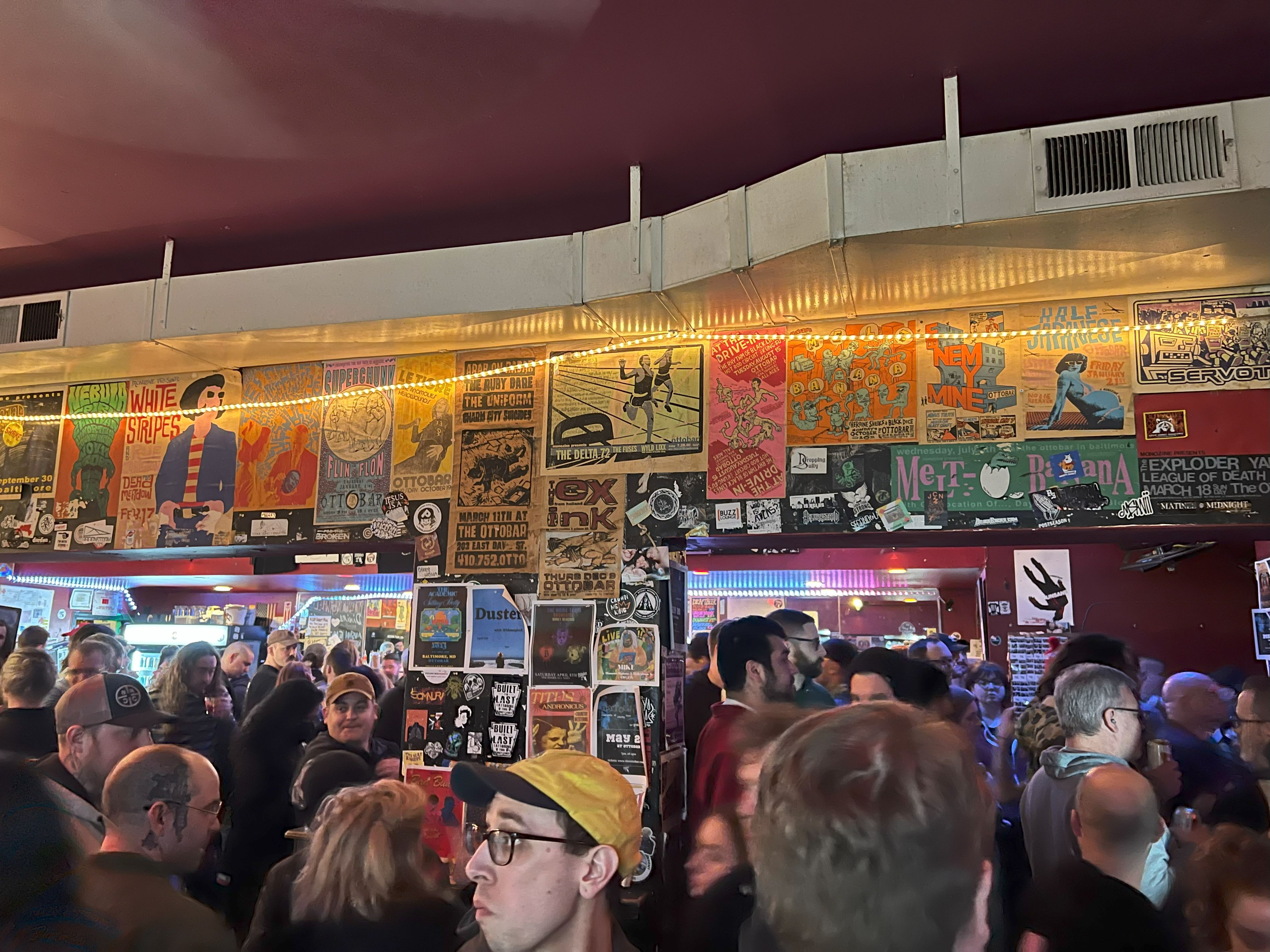
Ottobar Poster Wall

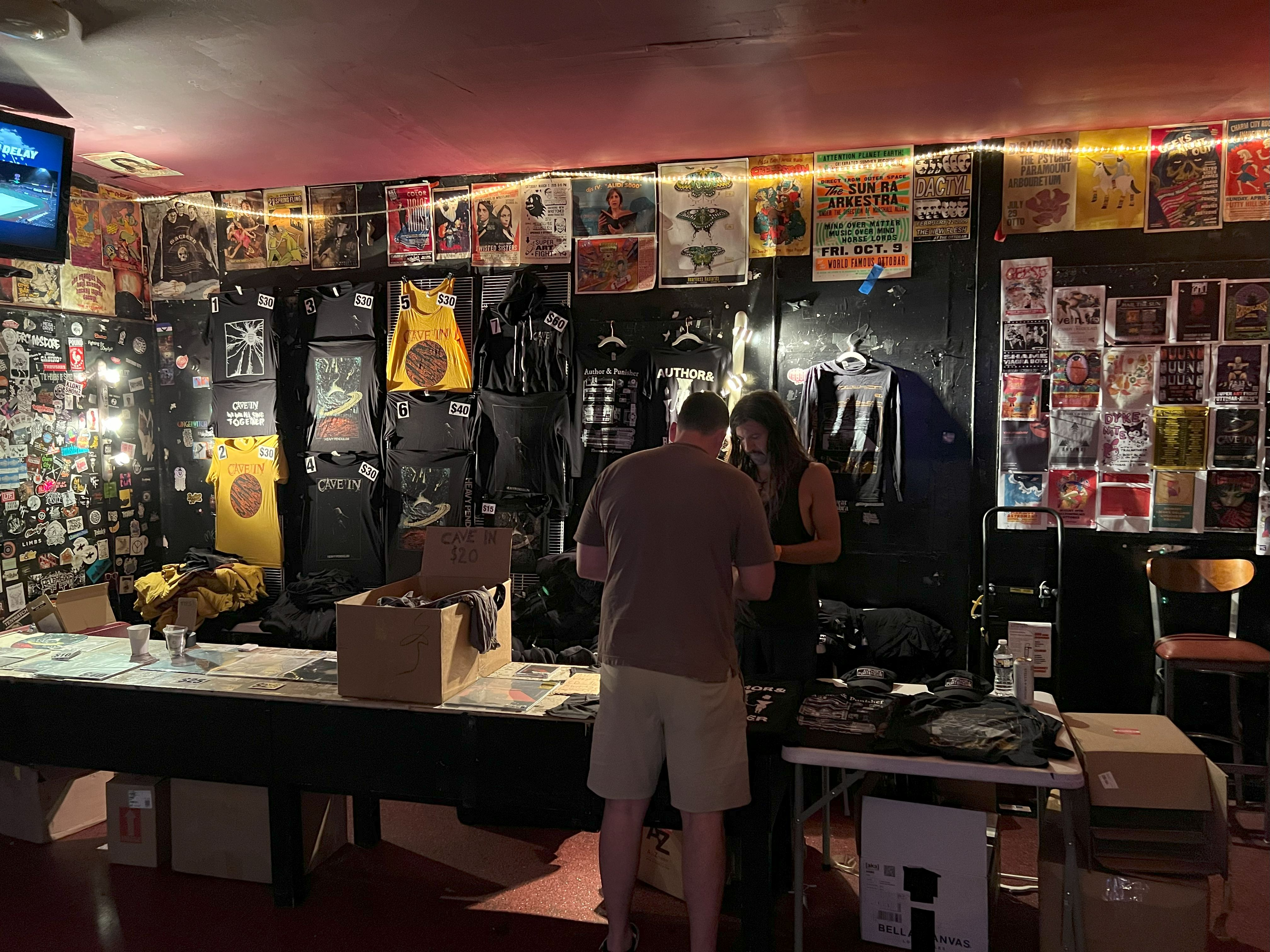
Ottobar merch table during a show.

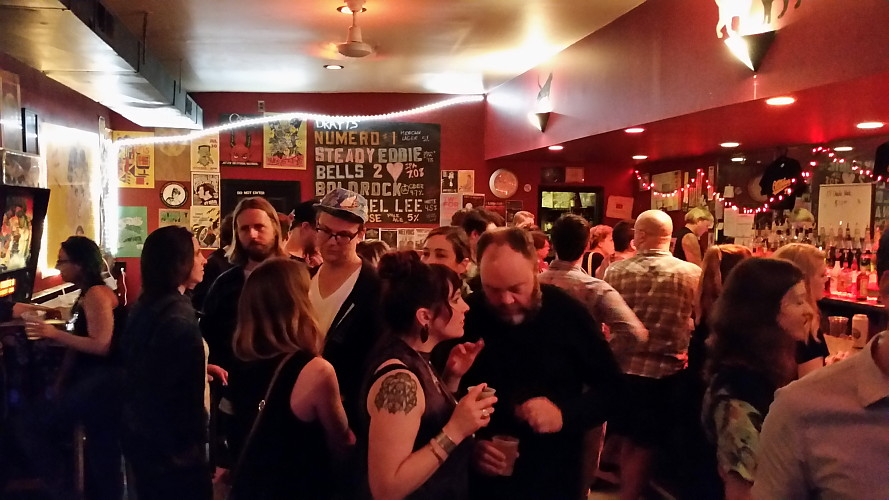
Ottobar crowd in bar area, June 2017

The new Ottobar also showcases emerging musical artists as well as national acts. Some of the artists who have performed at the Ottobar include national artists Animal Collective, At the Drive In, Atmosphere, the Black Keys, Bouncing Souls, Coheed and Cambria, Damnwells, David Cross, Death Cab for Cutie, Dinosaur Jr, Drive-By Truckers, Father John Misty, Jimmy Eat World, Jonathan Richman, KRS-ONE, Maroon 5, the Melvins, Michael Ian Black, Queens of the Stone Age, Quiet Riot, Sharon Van Etten, Supersuckers, TV on the Radio, the Breeders, Brand New, Movielife, Saves the Day, Frank Turner, Samiam, and the Yeah Yeah Yeahs. The venue also supports and showcases local artists such as Celebration, Lake Trout, Misery Index, Ponytail, and Thrushes. There are theme nights such as Underground Dance Party, Pet Wedding, Butcher Knife Throwing Contest, Spelling Bee, Ottobar Boys and Girls Choir, and Book Burning For Peace.

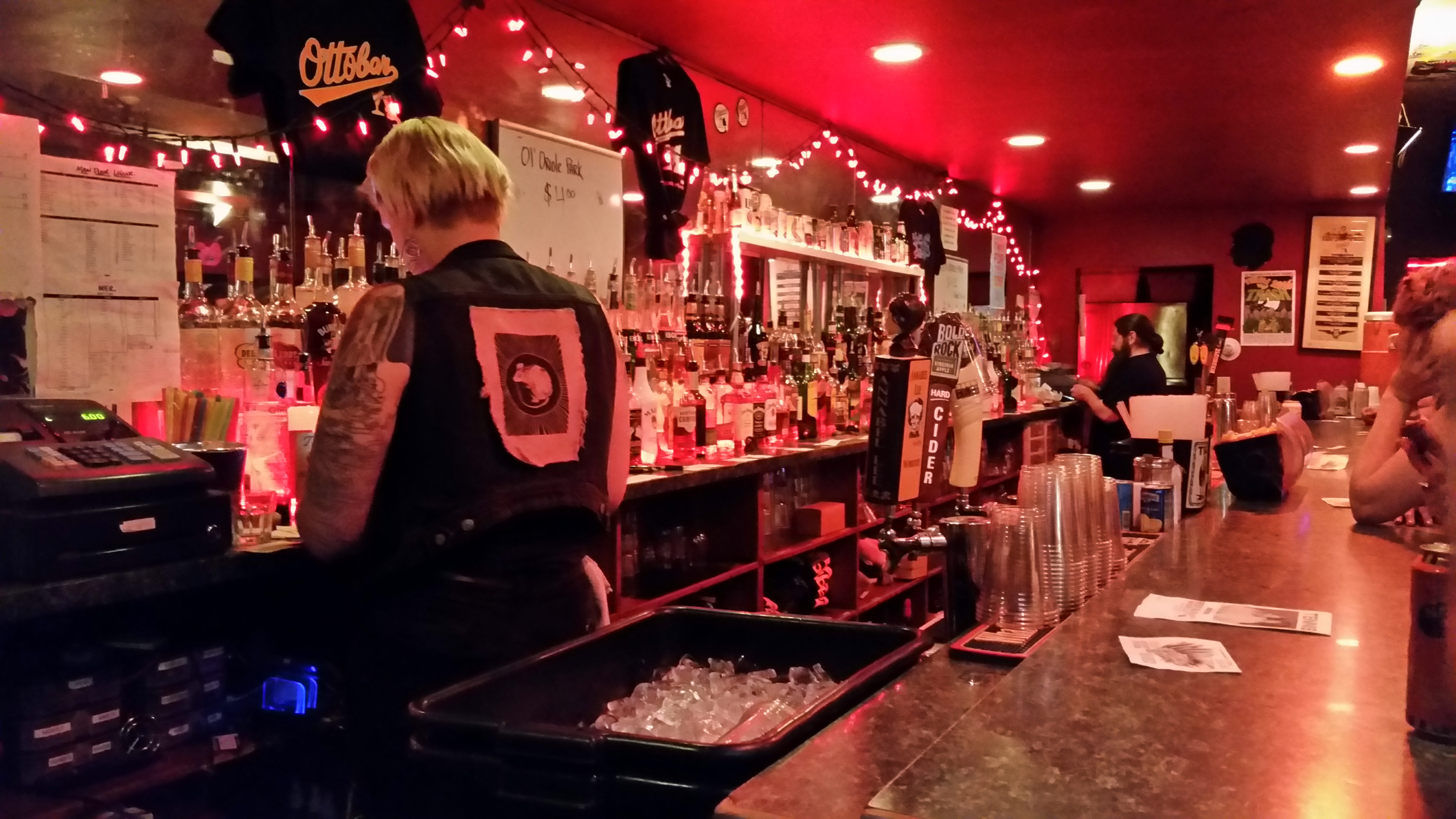
Ottobar bar, June 2017

It is the longtime home of Super Art Fight, hosting regular competitions since the event's inception in 2008.

In 2014, tragedy struck when Thomas Malenski and another employee were stabbed by Nicholas Heath after they escorted a friend of Heath's outside. Malenski later died of his wounds. Musicians, patrons, and employees were surprised and said they had never felt unsafe coming to or being inside the Ottobar. The only other reported issues had been neighbors occasionally complaining that patrons were noisy as they left the bar.

The Ottobar also hosts fundraisers and other events for various causes. In 2017, supporters of Planned Parenthood of Maryland met at Ottobar in Baltimore the day before the Women's March on Washington.

== 2018 sale ==
On November 2, 2018 the owners of Ottobar announced on Facebook that they planned to sell the bar and seemed to suggest that they had found a buyer. They refrained from naming the potential buyer. A real estate listing indicated a price of $1.25 million dollars for the real estate, liquor license, and a permit for daily live entertainment on all levels, as well as the furniture and sound equipment.

In May 2019, it was announced that Ottobar was sold to long time employee Tecla Tesnau, a bartender who had been with the Ottobar since it opened. "To be honest with you, I really don't want to change a single thing," Tesnau told Sam Sessa of WTMD, "At all. Except for maybe clean the bathrooms."

== COVID-19 pandemic ==
Due to the COVID-19 global pandemic, Ottobar closed its indoor space to the public in March 2020. Ottobar launched a GoFundMe campaign in August 2020 to cover "employee payroll, rents, basic operations, and supplies needed to protect all staff and guests to ensure their safety."

In November 2020, Ottobar released No Stagediving, a two-volume compilation featuring and benefiting Baltimore musicians.
