= Army of Me (band) =

American rock band

- Origin: Washington, D.C., US
- Genres: Indie rock, alternative rock
- Years active: 2001–2010 (hiatus); 2013–2017
- Label: Doghouse
- Past members: Vince Scheuerman; Dennis Manuel; Conrado Bokoles; Brad Tursi; John Hutchins
- Website: Official website

Army of Me was a band formed in Washington, D.C.

== History ==
Vocalist and guitarist Vince Scheuerman grew up in a Gaithersburg, Maryland religious community. Feeling frustrated with mainstream culture, he turned to music as an outlet. Scheuerman and long-time friend John Hutchins, bass, joined a ska band, Sidewinders SC, but quit to start their own project. The pair formed Cactus Patch in 2001 with drummer Dennis Manuel.

Under the name Cactus Patch, they self-released 3 EPs on CD-Rs and one self-titled album. They changed their name to Army of Me not long after winning the WHFS Big Break contest which granted them an opening slot at the 2001 HFStival. The band's reputation in the Washington, D.C., area grew through street team promotion, active touring and multiple years playing the street stage at the HFStival. Guitar player Brad Tursi joined the band in 2003, filling out the live sound.

Army of Me went on to independently release the "Fake Ugly EP" as well as the "Demos EP" and toured the East Coast and the Mid-west of the United States. In January 2006, Army of Me signed a record deal with Atlantic Records. In February and March 2006, they recorded their record CITIZEN in a small beach house in Mathews, Virginia with producer Michael "Elvis" Baskette and engineer Dave Holdredge. The album was released April 10, 2007 on Doghouse/Atlantic records.

The band has toured with The Used, The Almost, Emery, Envy On The Coast, OAR, Dave Matthews, Switchfoot, Blue October, The Damnwells, Mae, The Bled, Fiction Family.

The band's single "Going Through Changes" has been in rotation on MTV, as well as several commercial radio stations in the US, including KROQ and DC101. It has also been featured in the video games MLB 06: The Show and Burnout Paradise. It has also been featured on the PlayStation 2 game Burnout Dominator. An acoustic version of the song "Perfect" was featured on the 2008 Olympic Soundtrack.

Hutchins left the band in 2006 to form Hello Tokyo, a New York City based band. Tursi moved to Nashville, Tennessee, to pursue a country music career. Scheuerman both tours solo under the Army of Me name, playing acoustic shows, and with a full band. The band released "Make Yourself Naked," an acoustic EP in 2009.

On October 12, 2010, Scheuerman announced on the band's Myspace page that the band would be put on hold so that he could focus his time on a new project called River James, in which John Hutchins returns playing bass guitar. Scheuerman stated the following: "I'm not gonna say that you'll never see Army of Me again but the truth is that I'm gonna be focusing my efforts on this new project - River James".

On March 11, 2013, the Army of Me official website announced that a new album is near completion. The website post did not include any specific details on the album.

On July 16, 2013, the Army of Me official website and Facebook announced the new album name (Searching For You) and release date (Oct 15, 2013).

On July 25, Vince Scheuerman posted an update to Tumblr explaining the battle he fought from 2009 through 2012, in brief, explaining how in April 2007, "a number of misfortunes struck, perhaps the most significant was a serious vocal cord injury" in which Vince lost his voice for several years. While he was unable to sing, his band members and team moved on and he doubted himself, only friends and supporters encouraged him to keep going and release the "Make Yourself Naked" EP. On New Year's Eve of 2009, with three close friends, Vince created River James. He proceeded to perform music with River James for a year (presumably). When River James ended, Vince, his voice now strengthening, continued to write. "Fast forward to early 2012, I was invited to play guitar with Canon Blue for a couple of nationwide tours. I’d met the singer and songwriter Daniel James through some River James touring in the year prior. These nationwide tours led to new friendships, a new hometown of Nashville, a producer Daniel James, a string arranger Jeremy Larson, who also toured with us, and a mixer Chad Howat. These were not only collaborators, but friends and a community that I cared for, and who cared for me. I decided to use the name Army Of Me. With a musical community, and the encouragement of friends and supporters, it became clear that Army Of Me was my story. I’ve been through the war, and I’m still marching. But I’m not alone in this journey as these friends, supporters, anyone reading this right now, are a part of my Army, and I’m a part of theirs. If my music can serve to encourage, and express the feeling that you’re not alone in your experiences - sometimes joyful and triumphant, but often devastating, lonely, feeling lost, or just simply the lingering feeling of longing for more, then this music will have been worth writing. Coming on October 15 is the first Army Of Me full-length album in six years. It is called “Searching For You”. I can't wait to share it with you."

The band disbandment in 2017. After that, Vince Scheuerman started working in software engineering.

== Discography ==
=== Studio albums ===
- Army of Me (Independent, 2001)
- Citizen (Doghouse, 2007)
- Searching for You (2013)

=== EPs ===
- Fake Ugly (PUR, 2004)
- Rise (Doghouse, 2006)
- Make Yourself Naked (2009)
- Demos EP (2010)
- White Flag Flies (2013)

=== Singles ===
- "Going Through Changes" (2007)

=== Album appearances ===
- Music from Degrassi: The Next Generation (2008)
