= 1999 in American television =

In American television in 1999, notable events included television series debuts, finales, cancellations, and channel initiations, closures and re-brandings, as well as information about controversies and disputes.

== Events ==
=== January ===
| Date | Event |
|---|---|
| 4 | On an episode of WWF Raw is War which had been taped six days earlier on December 29th, Mick Foley wrestling as Mankind defeats The Rock to win the WWF Championship. Meanwhile, on WCW Monday Nitro, Hulk Hogan defeats Kevin Nash for the WCW World Heavyweight Championship in the infamous Fingerpoke of Doom. Tony Schiavone on orders from Eric Bischoff gave away the results of Foley's championship victory. As a result, 600,000 viewers switch from Nitro to Raw. These incidents would mark the beginning of WCW's downfall until its closure in 2001. |
| 6 | Bob Newhart receives a star on the Hollywood Walk of Fame. |
| 11 | Jon Stewart debuts as host of Comedy Central's The Daily Show, replacing Craig Kilborn, who moves to CBS to succeed Tom Snyder as host of The Late Late Show. |
| 23 | Gene Siskel hosts his final episode of Siskel & Ebert with Roger Ebert. On February 3, 1999, Siskel announced that he would take a leave of absence for the rest of the season but promised to be back the next fall. On February 20, 1999, Siskel died suddenly from complications from a second brain surgery. On that final episode, Siskel and Ebert reviewed At First Sight, Another Day in Paradise, The Hi-Lo Country, Playing by Heart, and The Theory of Flight |
| 23 | Paula Zahn leaves CBS News after 10 years. |
| 31 | The Denver Broncos win their second consecutive Super Bowl against the Atlanta Falcons with a score of 34–19. The game is broadcast on Fox with the broadcast team of Pat Summerall and John Madden on the call. Fox's post Super Bowl show is the series premiere of Family Guy. |

=== February ===
| Date | Event |
|---|---|
| 1 | Prevue Channel re-brands as The TV Guide Channel, an EPG-branded version of TV Guide magazine. |
| 1 | HBO Family, HBO's fourth multiplex channel, is rebranded and premieres four new shows; A Little Curious, George and Martha, Anthony Ant and Crashbox. |
| 1 | Disney Channel re-brands its preschool block as Playhouse Disney. |
| 13 | Kids' WB acquired the rights to the anime Pokémon after it debuted in first-run syndication in 1998, making Pokémon one of the block's most successful series. |

=== March ===
| Date | Event |
|---|---|
| 13 | A special live edition of All That airs on Nickelodeon. |
| 24 | Olympic gold medalist Tara Lipinski is signed to the recently launched Nickelodeon Games and Sports for Kids network as a special host and sports correspondent. |
| 26 | Tom Snyder's last show on CBS's The Late Late Show. The following Monday, Craig Kilborn, late of Comedy Central's The Daily Show, takes his place as the show's host. |

=== April ===
| Date | Event |
|---|---|
| 18 | Hockey great Wayne Gretzky plays his final game (a 2–1 overtime loss between his New York Rangers and the Pittsburgh Penguins), which is broadcast in the United States by Fox. Mike Emrick and John Davidson were on the call with Sam Rosen conducting interviews. |
| 26 | NBC's The Tonight Show is broadcast in high-definition for the first time, making it the first late-night program to be broadcast in this format. Host Jay Leno's guests are Salma Hayek, David Arquette, and Jewel. |
| 29 | The pilot episode of WWF SmackDown! is broadcast on UPN as a single television special. (The show would officially premiere again on the network with a new stage on August 26.) The main event saw Stone Cold Steve Austin and The Rock team up to defeat the Corporate Ministry. |

=== May ===
| Date | Event |
|---|---|
| 1 | The 1999 Kids' Choice Awards air on Nickelodeon, hosted by Rosie O'Donnell. Television winners included All That (for "Favorite TV Show"), Kel Mitchell (of Kenan & Kel for "Favorite TV Actor"), Mary-Kate & Ashley Olsen (of Two of a Kind for "Favorite TV Actress") and Rugrats (for "Favorite Cartoon"). Immediately following the ceremony, Nickelodeon airs the pilot episode of its newest series SpongeBob SquarePants. Tara Lipinski, Bill Bellamy and Robert Ri'chard appeared in interstitials during the sneak peek where they mentioned the series officially premiering in July. SpongeBob would go on to become the longest running Nickelodeon series in its history. |
| 21 | Susan Lucci receives a Daytime Emmy Award for her role as Erica Kane on the ABC soap opera All My Children, after eighteen failed nominations during previous years. The ceremony is telecast live on CBS. |
| 23 | World Wrestling Federation wrestler Owen Hart is killed after falling 70 ft (21 m) from the rafters at Kemper Arena in Kansas City, during a live pay-per-view broadcast of Over the Edge. |
| 24 | During an in-ring promo on WCW Monday Nitro, WCW wrestler Bret Hart pays tribute to his brother Owen, who was killed in an in-ring accident the night before at Over the Edge. Meanwhile, WWF holds a tribute show on Raw Is War called Raw Is Owen. |
| 25 | The series finale of Home Improvement is broadcast on ABC. Patricia Richardson (Jill Taylor) is offered $25 million to do a ninth season; Tim Allen (Tim Taylor) is offered $50 million. The two decline the offer and the series comes to an end as a result. Jonathan Taylor Thomas (Randy Taylor) does not return to the show for the series finale (as he is busy with his education and filming the movie Speedway Junky, released in 2001), only appearing in archived footage. The series finale becomes the fifth highest-rated series finale television program of the 1990s and the ninth overall series finale ever presented on a single network in television history, watched by 35.5 percent of the households sampled in America, and 21.6 percent of television viewers. |

=== June ===
| Date | Event |
|---|---|
| 11 | Cartoon Network re-brands its Friday night block of original animated series as Cartoon Cartoon Fridays. |
| 17 | The NHL on Fox airs for the final time. |

=== July ===
| Date | Event |
|---|---|
| 18 | The Simpsons actor Hank Azaria marries actress Helen Hunt. The couple would file for divorce over a year later. |
| 31 | CBS This Morning co-anchor Russ Mitchell as a Saturday anchor of CBS Evening News along with Thalia Assuras as an alternate Saturday anchor starting in November. |

=== August ===
| Date | Event |
|---|---|
| 8 | The series finale of Mystery Science Theater 3000 airs on The Sci-Fi Channel, who had been broadcasting the past three seasons following its departure from Comedy Central in 1996. The last film to be featured in its original run is the 1968 film Danger: Diabolik. Mystery Science Theater 3000 would resume production in 2017, when new episodes begin airing on Netflix. |
| 16 | Who Wants to Be a Millionaire airs its first episode on ABC with Regis Philbin as host. It would go on to become the television season's highest-rated series and one of ABC's most successful shows. |
| 26 | WWF SmackDown! airs its first episode, live from the Kemper Arena in Kansas City, Missouri, on UPN. The main event saw Triple H defeating The Rock to retain the WWF Title thanks to interference from Shawn Michaels, who was the special guest referee. |
| 30 | Countess Vaughn leaves the cast of Moesha to star in her own television spin-off The Parkers with Mo'Nique, making her the first female African-American comedian to receive a spin-off. |

=== September ===
| Date | Event |
|---|---|
| 6 | UPN replaces its UPN Kids block with a new E/I-compliant block airing weekdays and Sunday mornings named Disney's One Too, a spinoff of ABC's Disney's One Saturday Morning. |
| 6 | In Schenectady, New York, PBS member station WMHQ is relaunched as WEWB-TV, a commercial broadcast station affiliated with The WB (the Capital District's first affiliate of that network). |
| 6 | PBS launches a 24-hour PBS Kids television network and new branding for its children's programming. |
| 7 | Viacom announced that the company would acquire CBS and its company, CBS Corporation (after CBS spun off Viacom in 1971 after the FCC forbids broadcast networks to own syndication units or more TV stations) which would cause the two companies to merge into one mega media empire. Which the merger would bring CBS and Paramount close. |
| 12 | The 51st Primetime Emmy Awards presentation is aired on Fox. |
| 20 | After four years, WGN's superstation feed drops programming from The WB and Kids' WB at the request of the network. The network's programs are replaced by movies, sports from Chicago's sporting teams and other programs. |
| 24 | The WB begins airing programming on Friday nights. |
| 26 | NBC airs a three-hour prime-time special in celebration of Saturday Night Live's 25th anniversary. |
| 27 | The Rock garners the highest cable rating in WWF history with Mankind in a segment entitled "This is your life" on Raw Is War, which draws a record 8.4 rating. |

=== October ===
| Date | Event |
|---|---|
| 4 | ABC affiliate WPTY, and sister station WLMT, both in the Memphis area, begin allowing The WB programming, most notably on WPTY for late nights, and some kids shows, like Pokémon, airing on WLMT. |
| 7 | Donald Trump announces his 2000 presidential campaign on an episode of Larry King Live. |
| 10 | The professional wrestling pay-per-view event, Heroes of Wrestling is broadcast from the Casino Magic hotel and casino in Bay St. Louis, Mississippi. Although the event was heavily promoted, it was only purchased by 29,000 households. Additionally, the event itself was generally regarded to be of poor quality: Wrestling Observer rated it the worst major wrestling event of 1999, with its editor Dave Meltzer giving a rating of "absolute zero" to a tag team match featuring Luke Williams and Butch Miller facing Nikolai Volkoff and The Iron Sheik. Meltzer's colleague, Bryan Alvarez of Figure Four Weekly, has repeatedly referred to this match as the worst he has ever seen and rated it "minus more stars than there are in the universe" |
| 27 | The fourth and deciding game of the World Series airs on NBC. This is to date, NBC's 39th and final World Series. The New York Yankees defeat once again the Atlanta Braves, winning their second title in a row and 25th in franchise history. |

=== November ===
| Date | Event |
|---|---|
| 19 | John Carpenter becomes the first player on ABC's game show Who Wants to Be a Millionaire? to win $1,000,000. Carpenter is also the first known contestant in the history of American game shows to win $1,000,000. |

=== December ===
| Date | Event |
|---|---|
| 1 | Richard Pryor appears in the cold open of the ABC sitcom Norm in what would prove to be his final television appearance. He would die in 2005, six years later. |
| 15 | NASCAR strikes a deal with Fox Sports, FX, NBC, and TBS (later moved to TNT) worth $2.4 billion for a new six-year package, covering the Winston Cup (now NASCAR Cup) Series and Busch (now Xfinity) Series schedules. NASCAR wanted to capitalize on its increased popularity even more, so the organization decided that future deals would be centralized; that is, the networks would negotiate directly with NASCAR for a regular schedule of telecasts. The old deal arrangement saw each track negotiate with the networks to broadcast their races. As a result, NASCAR had races on CBS, TNN, ESPN, ABC, NBC, and TBS. However, NBC, which had just entered the sport, showed only one race in 2000. NASCAR wanted to increase the number of races by each partner, and have as many races on broadcast networks as possible, to prevent fans from missing races. |
| 31 | ABC participates in the global broadcast 2000 Today with ABC 2000 Today. Peter Jennings anchors ABC's broadcast of the special from New York City, joined later by Dick Clark who hosts the countdown in Times Square. |

== Programs ==
=== Debuts ===
| Date | Show | Network |
|---|---|---|
| January 1 | The Blame Game | MTV |
| January 1 | Cold Case Files | A&E |
| January 1 | Scrapbook Memories | DIY Network |
| January 4 | Ed, Edd n Eddy | Cartoon Network |
| January 5 | Total Recall 2070 | Showtime |
| January 5 | Mega Babies | Fox Family |
| January 8 | Providence | NBC |
| January 10 | Batman Beyond | Kids' WB |
| January 10 | The Sopranos | HBO |
| January 10 | The PJs | Fox |
| January 11 | The Daily Show with Jon Stewart | Comedy Central |
| January 13 | 60 Minutes II | CBS |
| January 17 | The Brothers Flub | Nickelodeon |
| January 17 | Zoe, Duncan, Jack and Jane | The WB |
| January 18 | So Weird | Disney Channel |
| January 21 | Turks | CBS |
| January 25 | Dilbert | UPN |
| January 25 | Zoboomafoo | PBS Kids |
| January 26 | A Little Curious | HBO Family |
| January 26 | Crashbox | HBO Family |
| January 30 | The Jersey | Disney Channel |
| January 31 | Family Guy | Fox |
| February 1 | George and Martha | HBO Family |
| February 1 | Anthony Ant | HBO Family |
| February 6 | Power Rangers Lost Galaxy | Fox Kids |
| February 17 | The Planet's Funniest Animals | Animal Planet |
| March 8 | Station Zero | MTV |
| March 8 | Strange World | ABC |
| March 9 | Family Rules | UPN |
| March 9 | Sons of Thunder | CBS |
| March 15 | Payne | CBS |
| March 15 | Rescue 77 | The WB |
| March 15 | L.A. Heat | TNT |
| March 19 | Farscape | Sci-Fi Channel |
| March 24 | It's Like, You Know... | ABC |
| March 24 | The Norm Show | ABC |
| March 28 | Futurama | Fox |
| March 29 | The Late Late Show with Craig Kilborn | CBS |
| April 1 | Snap Judgment | Court TV |
| April 3 | The Big Moment | ABC |
| April 6 | Everything's Relative | NBC |
| April 7 | Strangers with Candy | Comedy Central |
| April 17 | Animals Are People Too | PAX TV |
| April 26 | Home Movies | UPN |
| May 1 | Mickey Mouse Works | ABC |
| May 1 | SpongeBob SquarePants | Nickelodeon |
| May 8 | The New Woody Woodpecker Show | Fox Kids |
| June 7 | Where Are They Now? | VH1 |
| June 10 | The Chimp Channel | TBS |
| June 14 | Power Play | UPN |
| June 15 | The Man Show | Comedy Central |
| June 19 | Beggars and Choosers | Showtime |
| July 5 | Passions | NBC |
| July 7 | Good Eats | Food Network |
| July 11 | Making the Video | MTV |
| July 11 | Movie Stars | The WB |
| July 17 | Rotten Ralph | Fox Family |
| July 18 | G vs E | USA Network |
| July 26 | Undressed | MTV |
| July 26 | Phred on Your Head Show | Noggin |
| August 1 | Grown Ups | UPN |
| August 3 | Downtown | MTV |
| August 9 | Independent Lens | PBS |
| August 9 | Katie Joplin | The WB |
| August 9 | Treasures in Your Home | PAX TV |
| August 14 | Destination Stardom | |
| August 16 | Rocket Power | Nickelodeon |
| August 16 | Who Wants to Be a Millionaire | ABC |
| August 17 | Chicken Soup for the Soul | Pax TV |
| August 19 | The Lot | AMC |
| August 26 | The Parkers | UPN |
| August 26 | WWE SmackDown | UPN |
| August 30 | Sonic Underground | Syndication |
| September 4 | Battle Dome | Syndication |
| September 4 | WWF Jakked/Metal | Syndication |
| September 6 | Dragon Tales | PBS Kids |
| September 6 | Sabrina: The Animated Series | UPN |
| September 6 | Storytime with Thomas | Fox Family |
| September 6 | It's Itsy Bitsy Time | Fox Family |
| September 7 | Strip Poker | USA Network |
| September 8 | Get Real | Fox |
| September 9 | Early Today | NBC |
| September 9 | Later Today | NBC |
| September 11 | Detention | Kids' WB |
| September 12 | Hope Island | Pax TV |
| September 13 | Blind Date | Syndication |
| September 13 | The Dr. Joy Browne Show | Syndication |
| September 13 | The Martin Short Show | Syndication |
| September 13 | The Queen Latifah Show | Syndication |
| September 13 | Fox Report | Fox News Channel |
| September 13 | Judge Mathis | Syndication |
| September 16 | Action | Fox |
| September 18 | Beast Machines: Transformers | Fox Kids |
| September 18 | Rescue Heroes | CBS |
| September 19 | Judging Amy | CBS |
| September 20 | Family Law | CBS |
| September 20 | Ladies Man | CBS |
| September 20 | Richard Simmons' DreamMaker | Syndication |
| September 20 | Relic Hunter | Syndication |
| September 20 | Cita's World | BET |
| September 20 | Safe Harbor | The WB |
| September 20 | Law & Order: Special Victims Unit | NBC |
| September 21 | The Mike O'Malley Show | NBC |
| September 21 | Mission Hill | The WB |
| September 21 | Once and Again | ABC |
| September 22 | Oh, Grow Up | ABC |
| September 22 | The West Wing | NBC |
| September 23 | Stark Raving Mad | NBC |
| September 23 | Third Watch | NBC |
| September 24 | Cold Feet | NBC |
| September 24 | Now and Again | CBS |
| September 24 | Odd Man Out | ABC |
| September 25 | Freaks and Geeks | NBC |
| September 25 | Peter Benchley's Amazon | Syndication |
| September 25 | Xyber 9: New Dawn | Fox Kids |
| September 26 | Snoops | ABC |
| September 26 | Jack & Jill | The WB |
| September 29 | Popular | The WB |
| September 29 | Work with Me | CBS |
| September 30 | Curb Appeal | HGTV |
| October 2 | Archie's Weird Mysteries | Pax TV |
| October 2 | Sir Arthur Conan Doyle's The Lost World | Syndication |
| October 2 | Spider-Man Unlimited | Fox Kids |
| October 5 | Emma | VH1 |
| October 5 | Shasta McNasty | UPN |
| October 5 | Angel | The WB |
| October 6 | Roswell | The WB |
| October 7 | House Hunters | HGTV |
| October 7 | Wasteland | ABC |
| October 8 | Harsh Realm | Fox |
| October 8 | Love & Money | CBS |
| October 8 | Random Acts of Comedy | Fox Family |
| October 9 | Angela Anaconda | Fox Family |
| October 9 | BeastMaster | Syndication |
| October 12 | The Strip | UPN |
| October 15 | Ryan Caulfield: Year One | Fox |
| October 16 | 100 Deeds for Eddie McDowd | Nickelodeon |
| October 16 | The Amanda Show | Nickelodeon |
| October 18 | Farmclub.com | USA Network |
| October 25 | Time of Your Life | Fox |
| October 30 | The Avengers: United They Stand | Fox Kids |
| November 1 | The Early Show | CBS |
| November 4 | Greed | Fox |
| November 12 | Mike, Lu & Og | Cartoon Network |
| November 12 | Courage the Cowardly Dog | Cartoon Network |
| November 28 | Little Bill | Nickelodeon |
| November 29 | webRIOT | MTV |

=== Ending this year ===
| Date | Title | Debut |
|---|---|---|
| January 2 | Birdz | 1998 |
| January 2 | Where on Earth Is Carmen Sandiego? | 1994 |
| January 16 | The New Batman Adventures | 1997 |
| January 18 | The Charlie Horse Music Pizza | 1998 |
| January 18 | Guys Like Us | 1998 |
| January 18 | Toonsylvania | 1998 |
| January 20 | Brats of the Lost Nebula | 1998 |
| January 20 | Encore! Encore! | 1998 |
| January 24 | Fantasy Island | 1998 |
| January 25 | Working | 1997 |
| February 3 | Maggie Winters | 1998 |
| February 11 | Cupid | 1998 |
| February 12 | Brimstone | 1998 |
| February 14 | Going Wild with Jeff Corwin | 1997 |
| February 21 | The Little Lulu Show | 1995 |
| February 25 | Vengeance Unlimited | 1998 |
| February 27 | Mad Jack the Pirate | 1998 |
| February 27 | The Mr. Potato Head Show | 1998 |
| February 28 | Trinity | 1998 |
| March 1 | DiResta | 1998 |
| March 1 | Hercules | 1998 |
| March 2 | Between Brothers | 1997 |
| March 8 | Hyperion Bay | 1998 |
| March 11 | Jumanji | 1996 |
| March 13 | Maggie | 1998 |
| March 14 | Due South | 1994 |
| March 16 | LateLine | 1998 |
| March 17 | Tracey Takes On... | 1996 |
| March 26 | The Late Late Show with Tom Snyder | 1995 |
| March 27 | The Net | 1998 |
| April 4 | Women: Stories of Passion | 1996 |
| April 6 | Station Zero | 1999 |
| April 10 | Pinky, Elmyra & the Brain | 1998 |
| April 11 | Anthony Ant | 1999 |
| April 13 | Family Rules | 1999 |
| April 13 | The Sifl and Olly Show | 1997 |
| April 17 | Sons of Thunder | 1999 |
| April 18 | Silk Stalkings | 1991 |
| April 23 | Turks | 1999 |
| April 26 | Caroline in the City | 1995 |
| April 27 | Everything's Relative | 1999 |
| April 28 | Payne | 1999 |
| May 3 | Rescue 77 | 1999 |
| May 4 | NewsRadio | 1995 |
| May 7 | Beast Wars: Transformers | 1996 |
| May 7 | Mystic Knights of Tir Na Nog | 1998 |
| May 10 | L.A. Doctors | 1998 |
| May 14 | Brother's Keeper | 1998 |
| May 14 | Young Hercules | 1998 |
| May 16 | Smart Guy | 1997 |
| May 20 | The Wayans Bros. | 1995 |
| May 20 | Promised Land | 1996 |
| May 21 | Millennium | 1996 |
| May 21 | Homicide: Life on the Street | 1993 |
| May 21 | Love Boat: The Next Wave | 1998 |
| May 22 | Air America | 1998 |
| May 22 | Mortal Kombat: Conquest | 1998 |
| May 22 | Viper | 1994 |
| May 23 | Sister, Sister | 1994 |
| May 23 | Unhappily Ever After | 1995 |
| May 24 | Mad About You (returned in 2019) | 1992 |
| May 24 | Melrose Place | 1992 |
| May 24 | Home Movies (returned in 2001) | 1999 |
| May 24 | The Sentinel | 1996 |
| May 25 | Clueless | 1996 |
| May 25 | Home Improvement | 1991 |
| May 28 | Todd McFarlane's Spawn | 1997 |
| June 2 | Star Trek: Deep Space Nine | 1993 |
| June 8 | Total Recall 2070 | 1999 |
| June 11 | Unsolved Mysteries (returned in 2001) | 1987 |
| June 11 | USA High | 1997 |
| June 23 | The Nanny | 1993 |
| June 23 | Turning Point | 1994 |
| June 25 | Another World | 1964 |
| June 25 | Love Connection (returned in 2017) | 1983 |
| June 26 | Doug | 1991 |
| June 26 | The Big Moment | 1999 |
| July 6 | Amazing Animals | 1996 |
| July 9 | Two of a Kind | 1998 |
| July 15 | Mercy Point | 1998 |
| July 25 | The Parent 'Hood | 1995 |
| July 30 | Legacy | 1998 |
| August 11 | In the House | 1995 |
| August 13 | Cow and Chicken | 1997 |
| August 21 | WWF Shotgun Saturday Night | 1997 |
| August 28 | The New Addams Family | 1998 |
| September 6 | NBC News at Sunrise | 1983 |
| September 10 | Hard Copy | 1989 |
| September 12 | Mystery Science Theater 3000 (returned in 2017) | 1988 |
| September 17 | Match Game (returned in 2016) | 1962 |
| September 24 | Timon & Pumbaa | 1995 |
| September 28 | The Mike O'Malley Show | 1999 |
| October 20 | Work with Me | 1999 |
| October 21 | Wasteland | 1999 |
| October 22 | Ryan Caulfield: Year One | 1999 |
| October 22 | Sonic Underground | 1999 |
| October 29 | Cold Feet | 1999 |
| October 29 | CBS This Morning (returned in 2012) | 1987 |
| November 5 | Emma | 1999 |
| November 8 | Downtown | 1999 |
| November 12 | Poltergeist: The Legacy | 1996 |
| November 19 | Sabrina: The Animated Series | 1999 |
| November 22 | Hercules: The Legendary Journeys | 1995 |
| November 28 | Safe Harbor | 1999 |
| December 1 | Viva Variety | 1997 |
| December 2 | Action | 1999 |
| December 10 | Dexter's Laboratory (returned in 2001) | 1996 |
| December 12 | Figure It Out (returned in 2012) | 1997 |
| December 16 | The Chimp Channel | 1999 |
| December 17 | Little Men | 1998 |
| December 18 | Power Rangers Lost Galaxy | 1999 |
| December 18 | Snoops | 1999 |
| December 28 | Oh, Grow Up | 1999 |
| December 31 | Sunset Beach | 1997 |

=== Entering syndication this year ===
| Show | Seasons | In production | Notes | Source |
|---|---|---|---|---|
| 3rd Rock from the Sun | 4 | Yes | | |
| Caroline in the City | 4 | Yes | | |
| Clueless | 3 | No | | |
| The Drew Carey Show | 4 | Yes | | |
| In the House | 5 | No | | |
| JAG | 4 | Yes | Cable syndication on USA Network | |
| Law & Order: Special Victims Unit | 1 | Yes | Cable syndication on USA Network | |
| Millennium | 3 | No | Cable syndication on FX | |
| The Parent 'Hood | 5 | No | | |
| Star Trek: Voyager | 5 | Yes | | |
| Two of a Kind | 1 | No | Cable syndication on Fox Family Channel | |
| Unhappily Ever After | 5 | No | | |
| The Wayans Bros. | 5 | No | | |
| Working | 2 | No | Cable syndication on USA Network | |

=== Resuming this year ===
| Title | Last aired | Previous network | New title | New network | Date of return |
|---|---|---|---|---|---|
| Timon and Pumbaa | 1996 | Syndication and CBS | Same | Toon Disney | January 1 |
| Zoom | 1978 | PBS | Same | PTV | January 4 |
| Are You Afraid of the Dark? | 1996 | Nickelodeon | Same | Same | February 6 |
| ReBoot | 1996 | Syndication and ABC | Same | Toonami | March 15 |
| Johnny Bravo | 1997 | Cartoon Network | Same | Same | July 2 |
| Divorce Court | 1992 | Syndication | Same | Same | September 7 |
| Tales from the Cryptkeeper | 1994 | ABC | The New Tales from the Cryptkeeper | CBS | September 11 |
| Family Feud | 1995 | Syndication | Same | Same | September 20 |
| Ace Ventura: Pet Detective | 1997 | CBS | Same | Nickelodeon | October 29 |

=== Changes of network affiliation ===
| Show | Moved from | Moved to |
|---|---|---|
| Timon and Pumbaa | Syndication and CBS | Toon Disney |
| Franklin | CBS Kidshow | Nick Jr. |
| Ace Ventura: Pet Detective | CBS | Nickelodeon |
| Tales from the Cryptkeeper | ABC | CBS |
| Recess | ABC | ABC/UPN |
| Pepper Ann | ABC | ABC/UPN |
| ReBoot (US terrestrial rights) | Syndication | Toonami |
| National Geographic Explorer | TBS | CNBC |
| Leeza | NBC | Syndication |
| Between Brothers | Fox | UPN |

=== Milestone episodes and anniversaries ===
| Show | Network | Episode # | Episode title | Episode airdate | Source |
|---|---|---|---|---|---|
| Barney & Friends | PBS | 100th episode | "A Royal Welcome" | April 6 | |

=== Made-for-TV movies and miniseries ===
| Title | Channel | Date of airing |
|---|---|---|
| Zenon: Girl of the 21st Century | Disney Channel | January 23 |
| Deep in My Heart | CBS | February 14 |
| Alice in Wonderland | NBC | February 28 |
| Replacing Dad | CBS | March 14 |
| Great Expectations | PBS | May 9 |
| Joan of Arc | CBS | May 15 |
| Atomic Train | NBC | May 16 |
| A Lesson Before Dying | HBO | May 22 |
| Pirates of Silicon Valley | TNT | June 20 |
| Vendetta | HBO | July 3 |
| Johnny Tsunami | Disney Channel | July 24 |
| First Daughter | TBS | August 15 |
| Don't Look Under the Bed | Disney Channel | October 9 |
| RKO 281 | HBO | November 20 |
| Horse Sense | Disney Channel | November 20 |
| Runaway Reptar | Nickelodeon | November 27 |
| Cinderelmo | FOX | December 6 |
| Dexter's Laboratory: Ego Trip | Cartoon Network | December 10 |
| The Lady in Question | A&E | December 12 |

== Networks and services ==
=== Network launches ===
| Network | Type | Launch date | Notes | Source |
|---|---|---|---|---|
| Noggin | Cable and satellite | February 2 | A joint venture between Nickelodeon and the Children's Television Workshop, airing educational programming for pre-schoolers and school-aged children from both parties. Dish Network and Americast carried the network at launch. | |
| Nickelodeon Games and Sports for Kids | Cable and satellite | March 1 | A channel broadcasting games shows and sports-related programs from Nickelodeon. | |
| Starz Cinema; Starz Family | Cable and satellite | May 1 | | |
| HBO Comedy; HBO Zone | Cable and satellite | May 6 | First announced in April 1998, HBO Comedy airs comedic films plus HBO comedy series and stand-up specials, while HBO Zone airs programs aimed at young adults. | |
| TV Globo Internacional | Cable and satellite | August 24 | | |
| PBS Kids | Cable and satellite/over-the-air multicast | September 6 | A 24-hour channel showing PBS' children's programs (notably excluding Sesame Street, whose pay TV rights were held by Noggin). | |
| News 8 Austin | Cable television | September 13 | A 24-hour news network serving the Greater Austin area. | |
| DIY Network | Cable and satellite | September 30 | An interactive spin-off of HGTV carrying instructional programs related to "do it yourself" activities. | |
| Boyz Channel | Cable television | October 31 | A spin-off of the Fox Family Channel airing programs aimed towards a young male audience. | |
| Girlz Channel | Cable television | October 31 | A spin-off of the Fox Family Channel airing programs aimed towards a young female audience. | |

=== Conversions and rebrandings ===
| Old network name | New network name | Type | Conversion date | Notes | Source |
|---|---|---|---|---|---|
| Starz! 2 | Starz! Theater | Pay television | July | | |

== Television stations ==
=== Station launches ===
| Date | City of license/Market | Station | Channel | Affiliation | Notes/Ref. |
|---|---|---|---|---|---|
| January 1 | Seattle, Washington | KHCV | 45 | Independent | |
| January 5 | Tucson, Arizona | KWBA | 58 | The WB | |
| January 19 | Twin Falls, Idaho | K26EW | 26 | TBN | |
| February 12 | Las Vegas, Nevada | KCNG-LP | 25 | UPN (primary); America's Voice (secondary) | |
| February 15 | Phoenix, Arizona | KPPX-TV | 51 | Pax TV | |
| February 19 | San Antonio, Texas | KPXL-TV | 26 | Pax TV | |
| March 5 | Santa Fe/Albuquerque, New Mexico | KWBQ | 19 | The WB | |
| March 12 | New York City | W36AD | 36 | Independent | |
| April | Albuquerque, New Mexico | KAPX | 41 | Pax TV | |
| May 3 | Lexington, Kentucky | W62CL | 62 | UPN | Originally an LPTV translator of WAOM/Morehead, Kentucky |
| May 5 | Worcester, Massachusetts | WYDN | 48 | Prime Time Christian Broadcasting | Now a Daystar affiliate licensed in Lowell, Massachusetts |
| June 7 | Camden/Little Rock, Arkansas | KKYK-TV | 49 | The WB | |
| June 7 | Williamson, West Virginia | W45AZ | 45 | TBN | |
| June 17 | Batavia/Buffalo, New York | WPXJ-TV | 51 | Pax TV | |
| June 20 | Bemidji/Brainerd, Minnesota | KFTC | 26 | Fox | Satellite of WFTC/Minneapolis |
| July 6 | Filer/Twin Falls, Idaho | KBGH | 19 | Educational independent | |
| July 9 | Honolulu, Hawaii | KAIE | 38 | Religious independent | |
| August | Lincoln, Nebraska | K18CD | 18 | Fox | Translator of KSNB/Superior |
| August 1 | Rio Grande City, Texas (Brownsville/McAllen, Texas, USA/Reynosa/Matamoros, Tamaulipas, Mexico) | KTLM | 40 | Telemundo | |
| August 1 | Spokane, Washington | KGPX-TV | 34 | Pax TV | |
| August 4 | Baton Rouge, Louisiana | W19AW | 19 | UPN | |
| August 5 | Wichita, Kansas | KWCV | 33 | The WB | |
| August 8 | Seattle, Washington | KBEH | 51 | ValueVision | |
| August 21 | St. George, Utah | KUSG | 12 | CBS | Satellite of KUTV/Salt Lake City, Utah |
| August 27 | Waterville/Portland, Maine | WMPX-TV | 23 | Pax TV | |
| August 30 | Iowa/Cedar Rapids, Iowa | KWKB | 20 | The WB | |
| September 12 | Muskogee/Tulsa, Oklahoma | KWBT | 19 | The WB | |
| September 17 | Tuskegee/Montgomery, Alabama | WBMM | 22 | Pax TV | |
| November 1 | Tecate/Tijuana, Baja California, Mexico (San Diego, California, United States) | KHUPN-TV | 49 | UPN | |
| November 5 | Colorado Springs, Colorado | KXTU-LD | 57 | UPN | |
| November 7 | Bismarck, North Dakota | KNDX | 26 | Fox | |
| November 10 | Paducah, Kentucky | W52DC | 49 | UPN | |
| November 15 | Minot, North Dakota | KXND | 24 | Fox | |
| December 1 | Wausau, Wisconsin | WFXS-DT | 55 | Fox | |
| December 22 | Flint, Michigan | WXON-LP | 54 | Independent | |
| Unknown date | Boca Raton, Florida | WPPB-TV | 63 | Educational independent | |
| Unknown date | Charlotte Amalie, U.S. Virgin Islands | WVXF | 17 | Fox | |
| Unknown date | Honolulu, Hawaii | KWBN | 44 | Daystar | |
| Unknown date | Laredo, Texas | K55HW | 55 | Mas Musica | |
| Unknown date | McAllen/Brownsville, Texas | KZMC-LP | 35 | America's Store | Translator of KNWS-LP/Brownsville |
| Unknown date | Milwaukee, Wisconsin | W41CV | 41 | WebFN | |
| Unknown date | Victoria, Texas | K27EG | 27 | NBC | |

=== Network affiliation changes ===
| Date | City of license/Market | Station | Channel | Old affiliation | New affiliation | Notes/Ref. |
|---|---|---|---|---|---|---|
| June 12 | Lima, Ohio | WLQP-LP | 18 | Fox (as W18BP) | UPN | |

=== Station closures ===
| Date | Market | Station | Channel | Affiliation |
|---|---|---|---|---|
| October 31 | Buffalo, New York | WFHW-LP | 58 | Independent |

== Births ==
| Date | Name | Notability |
|---|---|---|
| January 1 | Diamond White | Actress (The Haunted Hathaways, The Lion Guard, Pinky Malinky) and singer |
| January 4 | Gage Munroe | Canadian voice actor (Stoked, PAW Patrol, Hotel Transylvania: The Series) |
| January 13 | Wé Ani | Singer (The Voice, American Idol) |
| January 18 | Karan Brar | Actor (Jessie, Bunk'd) |
| January 18 | Mateus Ward | Actor (Lab Rats, Hostages, Murder in the First) |
| January 22 | Ricky Garcia | Actor (Best Friends Whenever) |
| January 30 | Mavrick Moreno | Actor (Every Witch Way) |
| February 10 | Tiffany Espensen | Actress (Phineas and Ferb, Bucket & Skinner's Epic Adventures, Kirby Buckets) |
| March 2 | Caleb Lee Hutchinson | Singer (American Idol) |
| March 5 | Madison Beer | American singer |
| March 20 | Olivia Stuck | Actress (Kirby Buckets) |
| March 21 | Lexi DiBenedetto | Actress (Knight Squad, The Really Loud House) |
| March 22 | Gavin MacIntosh | Actor (The Fosters) |
| March 27 | Natasha Calis | Actress |
| April 2 | Sophie Reynolds | Actress (Gamer's Guide to Pretty Much Everything, Youth & Consequences) |
| April 6 | Kwesi Boakye | Actor (Men of a Certain Age, The Looney Tunes Show, The Amazing World of Gumball) |
| April 7 | Conner Rayburn | Actor (According to Jim) |
| April 9 | Isaac Hempstead-Wright | English actor (Game of Thrones) |
| May 1 | Tiffany Stratton | Pro wrestler (WWE) |
| May 4 | Hook | Pro wrestler (AEW) |
| May 5 | Jonny Gray | Canadian actor (Max & Shred) |
| May 11 | Madison Lintz | Actress (The Walking Dead, Bosch) |
| May 11 | Sabrina Carpenter | Actress (Sofia the First, Girl Meets World, Milo Murphy's Law) and singer |
| May 22 | Camren Bicondova | Actress (Gotham) |
| May 25 | Brec Bassinger | Actress (The Haunted Hathaways, Bella and the Bulldogs, School of Rock, All Night, The Loud House, Stargirl) |
| May 26 | Kerry Ingram | English actress (Game of Thrones) |
| May 28 | Cameron Boyce | Actor (Jessie, Jake and the Never Land Pirates, Gamer's Guide to Pretty Much Everything, Descendants, Descendants: Wicked World) (d. 2019) |
| May 30 | Sean Giambrone | Actor (The Goldbergs, Clarence) |
| June 5 | Denisea Wilson | Actress (Every Witch Way) |
| June 11 | Katelyn Nacon | Actress (The Walking Dead, T@gged) |
| June 11 | Saxon Sharbino | Actress (Touch, Love) |
| June 18 | Willie Spence | Singer (American Idol) (d. 2022) |
| June 20 | Kayla Maisonet | Actress (Dog with a Blog, The Haunted Hathaways, Stuck in the Middle, Speechless) |
| June 21 | Natalie Alyn Lind | Actress (The Goldbergs, Gotham, The Gifted) |
| June 26 | Harley Quinn Smith | Actress |
| June 27 | Chandler Riggs | Actor (The Walking Dead) |
| July 5 | Gus Kamp | Actor (Best Friends Whenever) |
| July 9 | Claire Corlett | Canadian voice actress (Sweetie Belle on My Little Pony: Friendship Is Magic) |
| July 30 | Joey King | Actress (Ramona and Beezus, The Conjuring, The Kissing Booth) |
| August 4 | Kelly Gould | Actress (Rita Rocks, Jessie) |
| August 7 | Breanna Nix | Singer (American Idol) |
| August 13 | Corey Fogelmanis | Actor (Girl Meets World) |
| August 13 | Eli Brown | Actor (Pretty Little Liars: The Perfectionists, Gossip Girl) |
| August 14 | Alison Thornton | Actress |
| August 21 | Maxim Knight | Actor (Falling Skies) |
| August 22 | Ricardo Hurtado | Actor (School of Rock) |
| September 7 | Michelle Creber | Voice actress (Martha Speaks, My Little Pony: Friendship Is Magic) |
| September 7 | Cameron Ocasio | Actor (Sam & Cat) |
| September 9 | Ronni Hawk | Actress (Stuck in the Middle, On My Block) |
| September 13 | Zoey Burger | Actress (Every Witch Way) |
| September 14 | Emma Kenney | Actress (Shameless) |
| October 2 | Skye Blue | Pro wrestler (AEW) |
| October 2 | Nathaniel Potvin | Actor (Mech-X4) |
| October 6 | Will Shadley | Voice actor (Gorgonzola on Chowder) |
| October 13 | Nell Tiger Free | English actress (Game of Thrones) |
| October 15 | Bailee Madison | Actress (Wizards of Waverly Place, Once Upon a Time, Trophy Wife, The Fosters, Good Witch, Pretty Little Liars) |
| October 16 | Jadiel Dowlin | Actor (Star Falls) |
| October 16 | Joshua Hoffman | Actor (Talia in the Kitchen) |
| November 1 | Buddy Handleson | Actor (Shake It Up, Wendell and Vinnie, Bella and the Bulldogs) |
| November 5 | Zachary S. Williams | Actor (I Am Frankie) |
| November 10 | Kiernan Shipka | Actress (Mad Men, The Legend of Korra, Chilling Adventures of Sabrina) |
| November 10 | Michael Cimino | Actor (Love, Victor) |
| November 19 | Hannah Harper | Singer (American Idol) |
| November 28 | Lee Rodriguez | Actress (Never Have I Ever) |
| November 29 | Tim Johnson Jr. | Actor (Saturdays) |

== Deaths ==
| Date | Name | Age | Notability |
|---|---|---|---|
| January 4 | Iron Eyes Cody | 94 | Actor (well known for an anti-littering campaign ad of the 1970s) |
| January 25 | Herman Wedemeyer | 74 | Actor (Duke Lukela on Hawaii Five-O) |
| February 20 | Gene Siskel | 53 | Film critic (co-host of Siskel & Ebert) |
| March 18 | Gilbert Ralston | 87 | Screenwriter (The Wild Wild West) |
| March 22 | David Strickland | 29 | Actor (Todd Stities on Suddenly Susan) |
| March 28 | Freaky Tah | 27 | American rapper |
| March 30 | Gary Morton | 74 | Producer, second husband of Lucille Ball |
| April 10 | Jean Vander Pyl | 79 | Voice actress (Wilma Flintstone on The Flintstones and Rosie the Robot Maid on The Jetsons) |
| April 14 | Ellen Corby | 87 | Actress (Grandma Esther Walton on The Waltons) |
| May 8 | Dana Plato | 34 | Actress (Kimberly Drummond on Diff'rent Strokes) |
| May 21 | Sachiko Hirasawa | 25 | Japanese R&B singer of the sister duo Double |
| May 23 | Owen Hart | 34 | Wrestler (Superstar on WWF RAW is WAR) |
| June 11 | DeForest Kelley | 79 | Actor (Bones McCoy on Star Trek) |
| July 16 | John F. Kennedy Jr. | 38 | American lawyer and son of President John F. Kennedy |
| July 20 | Sandra Gould | 82 | Actress (Gladys Kravitz #2 on Bewitched) |
| August 23 | Martha Rountree | 87 | Broadcast journalist (Meet the Press) |
| August 24 | Mary Jane Croft | 83 | Actress (I Love Lucy, The Lucy Show, Here's Lucy) |
| September 5 | Allen Funt | 84 | Creator and host of Candid Camera |
| October 6 | Gorilla Monsoon | 62 | Pro wrestler and WWF commentator |
| November 9 | Mabel King | 66 | Actress (Mabel Thomas on What's Happening!!) |
| November 11 | Mary Kay Bergman | 38 | Voice actress (South Park) |
| November 18 | Beatrice Colen | 51 | Actress (Happy Days, Wonder Woman) |
| November 29 | Gene Rayburn | 81 | Host of (Match Game) |
| December 3 | Madeline Kahn | 57 | Actress (Oh Madeline) |
| December 10 | Shirley Hemphill | 52 | Comedian and actress (What's Happening!!) |
| December 14 | Walt Levinsky | 70 | Composer |
| December 28 | Clayton Moore | 85 | Actor (The Lone Ranger) |

== See also ==
- 1999 in the United States
- List of American films of 1999
