= History of Freeform =

Chronology of the American television network

The American cable and satellite television network Freeform was originally launched as the CBN Satellite Service on April 29, 1977, and has gone through four different owners and six different name changes during its history. This article details the network's existence from its founding by the Christian Broadcasting Network to its current ownership by The Walt Disney Company, which renamed the network to Freeform on January 12, 2016.

== CBN Satellite Service (1977–1988) ==
The network was founded by Pat Robertson as the CBN Satellite Service (CBN Satellite Network), an arm of his television ministry, the Christian Broadcasting Network (CBN). When the channel launched on April 29, 1977, it became the first basic cable channel to be transmitted via satellite from its launch and, effectively, the first national basic cable-originated network. (Note: TBS – which began transmitting via satellite in December 1976 – originated as a feed of broadcast television station WTCG (later WTBS and now WPCH-TV) in Atlanta, Georgia; the national version of the channel did not exist until 1981, when the Turner Broadcasting System launched a separate feed of WTBS for distribution to cable systems outside the Atlanta market containing national advertisements) Initially, the network offered only religious programs aimed at a Christian audience. The offerings on the CBN Satellite Service during its early years included CBN's flagship news/talk show, The 700 Club (which aired three times per day every Monday through Friday in the late-morning and at night), along with programs from many notable and lesser-known television evangelists. As a result, a few televangelists began to produce stripped programs to air on the network each weekday. The CBN Satellite Service grew its subscriber base to 10.9 million households by May 1981.

On September 1, 1981, the channel was relaunched as the CBN Cable Network. At that time of the name change, it was concurrently repositioned as an advertiser-supported "family-friendly" entertainment network, although the channel continued to offer religious programs that occupied about a third of its daily schedule. Entertainment programming that aired on the channel during this period included various classic television series (consisting of classic sitcoms from the 1950s and westerns from the 1950s and 1960s such as My Little Margie, Wagon Train, The Virginian and Bachelor Father), reruns of game shows, older movies, and some family-oriented drama series. CBN Cable also produced its first original series with the relaunch including a weekday-morning talk show, US a.m. and the faith-based soap opera Another Life.

The network also aired – and was even involved in the production of a few of them – a handful of Christian or family-friendly animated series, including some anime – such as CBN's own co-productions with Japanese animation studio Tatsunoko Production, Superbook and The Flying House and the television pilot sitcom Help Wanted; the channel also carried English-dubbed versions of Honey, Honey and Leo the Lion. Religious programming retained a sizeable portion of CBN Cable's schedule; in addition to continuing to run weekday airings of The 700 Club, non-CBN-produced ministry programs were relegated to Saturday and Sunday evenings, and Sunday mornings, encompassing only 22% of the network's programming lineup by 1990.

The channel's decision to mix secular and religious programs within its schedule mirrored the programming format used by the independent television stations that CBN had owned (then based in six markets) at the time of the rebranding. Additional programming that joined the CBN Cable lineup later in the decade included Hazel, Father Knows Best, The Big Valley, and Gunsmoke, plus foreign acquisitions The Campbells and Butterfly Island. Under the new format, the national distribution of the CBN Cable Network had grown from 28 million households in May 1985 to 35.8 million in May 1987.

== The Family Channel (1988–1998) ==
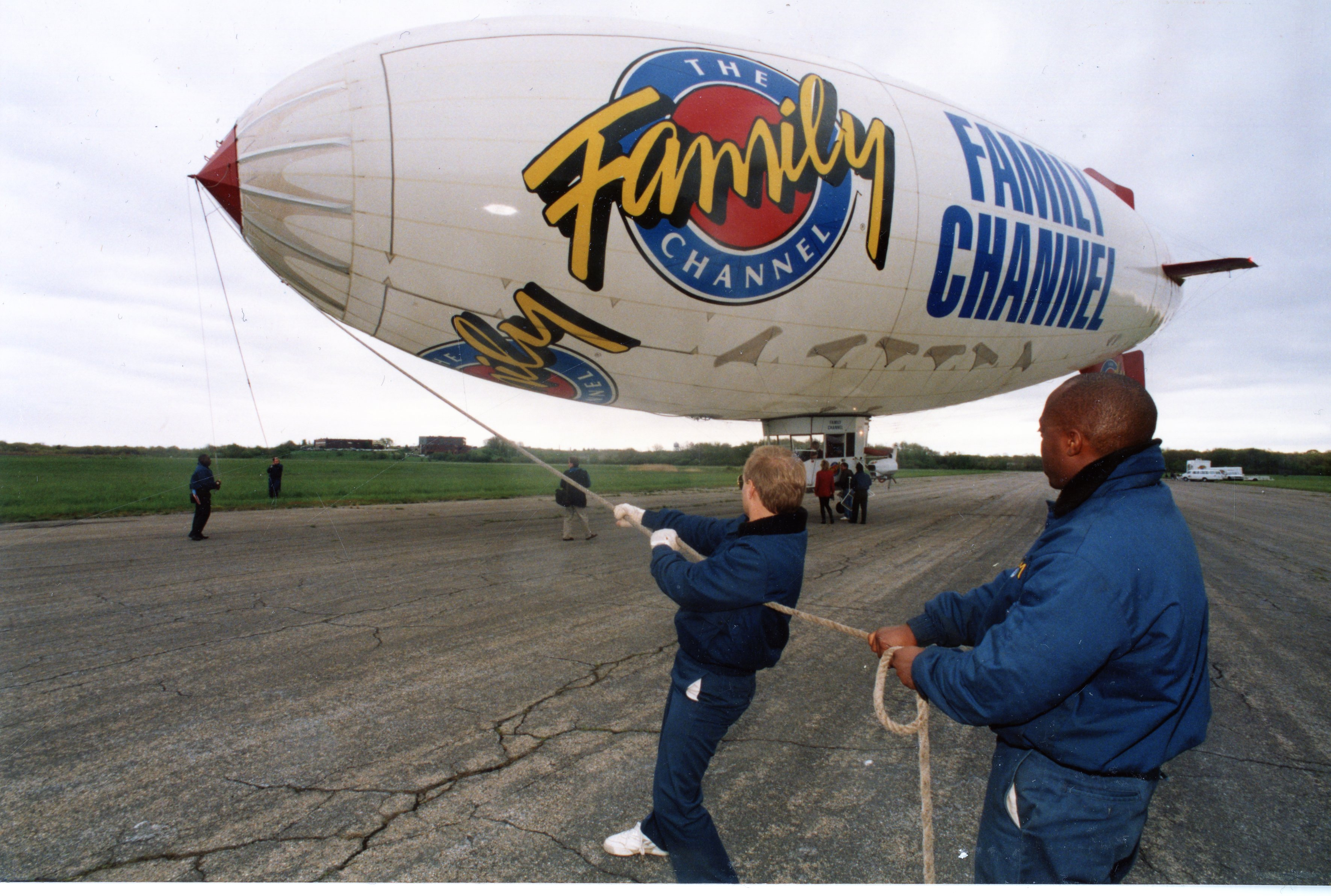
Blimp advertising The Family Channel in 1994

On August 1, 1988, the word "Family" was incorporated into the channel's name to better reflect its programming format, rebranding as The CBN Family Channel; however, it was identified in on-air and print promotions as simply The Family Channel, which became official on August 1, 1989, with the formal rollout of a revised logo omitting the "CBN" moniker (which had been used for movie presentations since January 1989). On September 11 of that year, "Fun Town", a daily children's program block featuring animated and live-action series from DIC Enterprises (whose programming library is now owned by WildBrain) premiered as part of The Family Channel's morning and weekend afternoon lineups. Under its programming deal with the company, DIC would produce four specials per quarter that would air on the channel, including holiday specials and a film version of the animated series The New Archies, although those plans would ultimately be scrapped.

On January 8, 1990, CBN spun off The Family Channel to International Family Entertainment Inc. (a newly formed company founded by Pat Robertson's eldest son and CBN Family network president, Timothy Robertson, and operated as a joint venture between the Robertson family and John C. Malone, owner of Denver-based cable television provider Tele-Communications Inc. and multimedia firm Liberty Media) for $250 million in convertible securities. The Robertsons paid $150,000 to acquire 4.5 million shares and a controlling ownership interest in IFE, with Pat and Tim subsequently purchasing an additional 1.5 million shares.

As a stipulation of the sale to International Family Entertainment, the channel was required to continue to carry The 700 Club (a stipulation that Pat Robertson also imposed when the channel was sold to Fox Family Worldwide in 1997 and then to The Walt Disney Company in 2001). This time-buy clause (which also mandates that the program air at suitable time slots that would allow it to attract decent viewership) was the only requirement that Robertson included in sales terms for the network to its subsequent owners. However, public assumption had conflated for many years that this sole existing stipulation was one of two that he included following the sale of the network by CBN; another contractual clause that Robertson was alleged to have added in the sale agreement to Fox required any future secular owners to maintain the word "Family" in the network's name in perpetuity. When Disney announced on October 6, 2015, that it would rebrand the network as Freeform, ABC Family president Tom Ascheim noted that there was no record of such a clause ever having been in place (although some published sources – including a reference in James B. Stewart's book on former chairman/CEO Michael Eisner's tenure at eventual owner Disney, DisneyWar – have only stated insofar that a clause including "Family" as a required part of the name was incorporated into previous carriage agreements for the channel with cable and satellite providers).

By 1989, the channel was seen in 47.3 million households, with its distribution jumping to 54 million homes (or 92% of all U.S. households with a cable television subscription) by 1992. At that point, the 1950s sitcoms and westerns that had long been featured on its lineup were scaled back, in favor of more recent drama series as well as cartoons and later, game shows (with a mix of both original programs like Trivial Pursuit and Shop 'til You Drop, and reruns of older game shows such as Name That Tune and Let's Make a Deal). The channel's weekday afternoon game show block consisted of the aforementioned programs along with the later episodes of Split Second and other shows specifically produced for the channel (such as Shopping Spree, Small Talk, Wait 'til You Have Kids and revivals of It Takes Two, Bordertown, Rin Tin Tin: K-9 Cop, Maniac Mansion and The New Zorro.

In March 1992, the Christian Broadcasting Network sold its interest in International Family Entertainment, when the company announced plans to become publicly traded, selling 6.66 million shares valued at $100 million, at a price between $14 and $16 per share (however, Pat Robertson retained ownership of 3.6 million shares in IFE until the company's sale to News Corporation); IFE would also sell 3.33 million shares of stock to the public. In January 1993, IFE purchased TVS Entertainment, a British broadcaster that had previously operated the South & South East of England franchise of the ITV network, and also owned MTM Enterprises, for $68.5 million.

That year, International Family Entertainment and Flextech jointly launched an international version of The Family Channel in the United Kingdom which broadcast a mixture of Family Channel's original programmes along with a small amount of UK-exclusive original shows and repeats from the TVS archive. On February 3, 1997, that channel eventually relaunched as the game show-dedicated network Challenge (an outgrowth of "Family Challenge Weekend", a weekend game show block that debuted on the channel in October 1996), following IFE's sale of its 61% controlling interest to Flextech in April 1996. In addition, in the United States, The Family Channel attempted to launch a spin-off network with a very similar format to that which the U.K. Family Channel evolved into; The Game Channel was intended as an interactive game show-oriented channel that was also set to launch in 1993. International Family Entertainment launched another cable channel, the Cable Health Club, on October 4, 1993, which was made available to cable providers without a carriage fee; the lineage of that network – which was later renamed FitTV – is traceable to the current-day Skydance-owned network Discovery Life.

The network gained more visibility when, for a four-year period from 1994 to 1997, it served as the primary sponsor of Ted Musgrave's #16 Ford Thunderbird in the NASCAR Winston Cup Series.

== Fox Family (1998–2001) ==
=== Purchase by Fox Kids Worldwide ===
Fox Family Worldwide logo

In early 1997, Rupert Murdoch-owned News Corporation entered into discussions to purchase a stake in The Family Channel with International Family Entertainment as a partner, seeking to bring it under its Fox Kids joint venture with Haim Saban. On June 11, 1997, News Corporation purchased International Family Entertainment for $1.9 billion. The latter company's assets were split within News Corporation's portfolio: The Family Channel was merged into Fox Kids Worldwide, a joint venture between majority owners News Corporation and Saban (which each owned a 49.5% share in the company), and media investment firm Allen & Company (which owned the remaining 1%), which was subsequently renamed Fox Family Worldwide following the completion of the acquisition.

The Family Channel was renamed Fox Family Channel – though on-air promotions typically referred to the network as just "Fox Family" – on August 15, 1998. With the change in ownership, Fox Family's operations were also migrated from the Christian Broadcasting Network's headquarters in Virginia Beach, Virginia, and integrated with the operations of some of News Corporation's other cable channels in Los Angeles at the Fox Network Center (located on the 20th Century Fox backlot in Century City). The MTM Enterprises library was assumed by 20th Television.

=== Early programming ===
Fox Family Channel logo, partially inspired by the 20th Century Fox logo, used from August 15, 1998, to September 1, 2000; a modified version of the logo used as The (CBN) Family Channel, incorporating the Fox network's wordmark, was originally used in some promotional materials.

When Fox purchased the channel, programmers sought to reposition it to target a dual audience: children in daytime, families at night. Once the network became Fox Family, the new owners dropped nearly all of the programming that it aired under The Family Channel brand – which at that point included original series like Home & Family and reruns of series such as Bonanza, The Rifleman, Carol Burnett and Friends, Hawaii Five-O, The High Chaparral, Rescue 911 and Diagnosis: Murder – and replaced them with shows that appealed to a younger demographic. Rich Cronin, who was appointed as the network's president and CEO, said regarding the channel's audience refocusing, "our focus is on younger families, more suburban or urban, more plugged into pop culture". Programming that appealed to children and teenagers was greatly expanded on the channel. Fox Family added more animated series to the lineup, many of which came from the Fox Kids program library. At launch, Fox Family offered four distinctive themed kids daytime blocks: "Morning Scramble/Weekend Chill" (all ages), "Captain Kangaroo's Treasure House" (pre-schoolers), "Toon-A Casserole" (all-animation) and "The Basement" (a three-hour after-school block).

Original series intended for family co-viewing were shown from 6:00 to 9:00 p.m. ET, leading into a nightly movie presentation. The relaunched prime time lineup was focused primarily around original unscripted programs including Outrageous! (a hidden camera game show hosted by Idalis DeLeon), I Can’t Believe You Said That! (a game show hosted by former NBA star John Salley), Life, Camera, Action (an amateur video compilation series), Show Me the Funny (a compilation series featuring videos originally shown on executive producer Vin Di Bona’s America's Funniest Home Videos, America's Funniest People), Ohh Nooo! Mr. Bill Presents (a compilation series featuring original and classic Mr. Bill sketches as well as British comedy skits including segments from the Mr. Bean TV series), as well as the only scripted series among the slate, The New Addams Family (a modern-day revival of the 1960s Addams Family series, which premiered as part of that year’s “13 Days of Halloween” event). This initial slate of original prime time shows underperformed, with The New Addams Family and Show Me the Funny being the only shows renewed for a second season; Fox Family, however, attempted other nonfiction series over the next two years, including Random Acts of Comedy (a half-hour comedy game show hosted by David Alan Grier) and Paranoia (a live interactive trivia game show hosted by Peter Tomarken). Fox Family's original programming budget was increased by $500 million, to be spent on 20 original movies and 680 episodes of original series. Fox Family was obligated to continue airing The 700 Club as part of the sale, but the program's airings were scaled back to two times each day (though the sale agreement required the channel to air it three times daily, once each in the morning, late-evening and overnight hours), with the evening broadcast being moved out of prime time, and pushed one hour later to 11:00 p.m. Eastern Time (from 10:00 p.m.).

In 1998, Fox Family Worldwide announced it would launch two spinoff digital cable networks, Boyz Channel and Girlz Channel; aimed at youth aged 2–16, the two networks, both launched in October 1999, contained programming content targeted at the respective genders as well as late-night lifestyle programming targeting parents; both channels ceased operations after one year on the air in August 2000, due to a combination of Fox/Saban’s inability to secure sufficient national cable distribution upon and following their launches (Boyz Channel and Girlz Channel were each carried in some 100,000 homes in an era when digital cable television was in its infancy) and the controversy that developed over the gender-segregated channels.

=== Major League Baseball ===
In April 2000, Fox Family began airing Major League Baseball (MLB) games in prime time on most weeks during the league's regular season, on an alternating basis with sister network FX. The network – which acquired the rights from Fox Sports Net (FSN), which aired the weekly telecasts across its regional sports networks (except in markets where the nationally televised game conflicts with scheduled sporting events involving local teams on the individual FSN outlet) from 1997 to 1999 – usually ran the games on either Thursday or Saturday nights.

Starting with the 2001 season, the network also carried games from the first round of the MLB playoffs, the Division Series, which did not air on Fox. Among the games that aired on Fox Family included one between the San Francisco Giants and the Houston Astros on October 4, 2001, in which Barry Bonds hit his 70th home run of the season, tying the all-time single season record that Mark McGwire had set only three years earlier (Bonds would break the record the following night).

=== The 700 Club ===
As part of a stipulation negotiated into International Family Entertainment's sale agreement with Fox Entertainment Group by Pat Robertson, Fox Family aired The 700 Club twice every weekday: a live broadcast at 9:00 a.m. Eastern Time, and a repeat at 11:00 p.m. Eastern. In addition, through other programming requirements stipulated by CBN through the deal, the network also aired a half-hour companion talk show serving as The 700 Club's weekday morning lead-in, Living the Life (which was replaced in 2010 by The 700 Club Interactive), as well as occasional weekend-long CBN telethons (which it continues to do as ABC Family/Freeform, with the latter now airing in the week before the Super Bowl each year). As of December 2011, The 700 Club airs three times per day Monday through Fridays, with the existing 9:00 a.m. live telecast and 11:00 p.m. rebroadcast having been joined by an additional repeat at 3:00 a.m. Eastern Time as part of the network's paid programming block, which runs from 2:00 a.m. until 7:00 a.m. A CBN spokesperson has stated "The 700 Club will continue to air now and in perpetuity on the network, no matter what the name."

=== Fox Family Films ===
Fox created a film division for the channel, Fox Family Films, which produced motion pictures targeted at different age groups, mainly towards children; the titles included Addams Family Reunion, which aired during Fox's inauguration of the channel under the initial format as Fox Family, and Digimon: The Movie, which was compiled from several Japanese Digimon short films. Aimed a more teenage audience, Fox Family Films created Ice Angel, a made-for-cable movie about a hockey player who is reborn as a female synchronized skater, as well as the thriller Don't Look Behind You. Fox Family also aired a wide array of Saban Entertainment-produced movies as well as many direct-to-video films from 20th Century Fox (including Richie Rich's Christmas Wish, Casper: A Spirited Beginning and Like Father, Like Santa).

In August 1999, the channel experienced its highest total viewership at that point in its history, with the premiere of the made-for-TV romantic/family comedy Au Pair.

=== 31 Nights of Halloween ===
In October 1998, Fox Family introduced one of its most successful programming concepts, "The 13 Days of Halloween," a two-week-long block beginning each year on October 19, leading into Halloween on October 31. This block – which was subsequently rebranded as the "13 Nights of Halloween" in 2002, under Disney/ABC ownership – introduced the original comedy series The New Addams Family, the unscripted series Scariest Places on Earth (hosted by Exorcist star Linda Blair, focusing on places infamous for frightening urban legends) and some new movies such as Casper Meets Wendy (the latter of which would become a staple of the block for several years, particularly during the years in which Hilary Duff, who made her acting debut in the film, starred in the Disney Channel series Lizzie McGuire). The block was temporarily suspended in 2003, following an overhaul of the channel's programming management under Disney. But it returned in 2004. A few years later, the 2002 live-action film adaptation of Scooby-Doo became part of its annual Halloween lineup. This continues to be one of the most successful programming blocks to date for the channel as ABC Family, and will be carried over under the Freeform brand. On May 15, 2018, Freeform renamed the block to 31 Nights of Halloween, meaning that the block now starts on October 1 and lasts throughout the whole month of October. With Disney's acquisition of Fox the following year, the channel, having already added the show itself, has also included marathons of The Simpsons' long-running Halloween-centric sub-series Treehouse of Horror in the block.

=== 25 Days of Christmas ===
Two years before the launch of its Halloween programming lineup, in 1996, what was then The Family Channel launched the "25 Days of Christmas", a four-week holiday-themed program block running annually during the month of December, formally starting on December 1 and continuing until Christmas Day on December 25. The block was carried over to Fox Family under News Corporation ownership, with a staple of the lineup being Christmas-themed specials from the Rankin-Bass library (among them, The Little Drummer Boy and Santa Claus Is Coming to Town), although it also features mostly holiday-themed theatrically-released and original made-for-TV movies, and other original programming. The "25 Days of Christmas" continued to air on the rebranded ABC Family following the sale to Disney in 2001, and expanded into include a sub-block that runs during late November, "Countdown to 25 Days of Christmas", beginning in 2007. On May 15, 2018, Freeform rebranded the “Countdown to 25 Days of Christmas” block to “Kickoff to Christmas”, extending it to November 1 and lasting for the entire month of November until “25 Days” begins on December 1.

=== Change in visual style ===
Fox Family Channel logo from September 1, 2000, to November 9, 2001; it was later modified as the initial logo under the ABC Family identity (with ABC's "circle" logo replacing the Fox wordmark) from November 10, 2001, to January 1, 2003.

On September 1, 2000, Fox Family adopted a new visual style, as part of an attempt to refocus its programming to attract an older audience. While in essence, it maintained a family-oriented format, the network began to feature some original and acquired programming aimed at adults during the early evening and in prime time. At that time, Fox Family purchased the syndication rights to the CBS series Early Edition, and two ABC series: My So-Called Life and Step by Step (the latter of which aired on the channel until March 2010 as ABC Family). The channel also acquired the short-lived comedy-drama series Freaks and Geeks, including episodes of the show that had not previously aired as a result of its 2000 cancellation by NBC, and broadcast more "romantic comedy"-themed original movies.

Keeping children and families in mind, the channel introduced the original series State of Grace (a half-hour period dramedy set in the 1960s, centering around a pre-teen from a conservative Jewish-American family and her boisterous best friend, raised by a free-wheeling divorced mother) and a programming block for teenagers, Fox Family's Summer High School Countdown (which introduced the four-piece Swedish pop girl group Play to US audiences). However, the idea was unsuccessful, as a year later, Fox Family was sold to The Walt Disney Company, and State of Grace was only renewed for one more season before it was cancelled.

=== Declining ratings ===
Under the control of Murdoch and Saban, Fox Family saw its overall viewership slide from 10th to 17th place in the Nielsen cable ratings as a result of an increasingly competitive race for younger viewers (with the channel facing brisk competition from established children's cable networks Nickelodeon, Cartoon Network and eventual corporate sister Disney Channel), and the bickering over ownership between News Corporation and Saban Entertainment founder and CEO Haim Saban, who eventually opted to exercise an option given by News Corporation to have the company buy out his 49.5% interest in Fox Family Worldwide on December 21, 2000. Some observers believe that the network chased away some of its older viewers when, without notice, News Corporation/Saban removed all of the older programming that it aired as The Family Channel – especially western reruns, which made up the bulk of its weekday and weekend schedule, dating back to its existence under the CBN Cable Network identity – in their effort to contemporize the channel, and never really replaced the core audience due to the absence of planning on how to retain that segment of the network's pre-acquisition viewer base, while simultaneously attracting new viewers. As a result, prime time viewership declined by 35% over the course of Fox Family's three-year tenure under Murdoch/Saban ownership.

It is also suggested that News Corporation hired more employees than were needed, and when Disney took ownership, as many as 500 people were laid off (this was also at a time when The Walt Disney Company itself was downsizing, as the company had laid off 400 other employees from its failed Go Network web portal). Fox Family also used many freelancers for certain aspects of the channel's operations and programming, such as its short-lived "block jocks" (which were on-air hosts that the channel hired to present its afternoon children's programs); most of the monikers for the network – including the slogans "You Belong" and "It's Electric" – were created by freelance artists.

== ABC Family (2001–2016) ==
=== Purchase by Disney and early attempts at changing the network's focus ===
The first logo as ABC Family, used from November 10, 2001, to August 31, 2003, being purchased by Disney

On July 23, 2001, News Corporation and Saban announced that Fox Family Worldwide Inc. would be sold to The Walt Disney Company for $2.9 billion; consequently, the unit would be renamed ABC Family Worldwide Inc. following the sale and integration into the company's Disney–ABC Cable Networks Group division. (The channel, as Freeform, would be reunited with three of its former sister cable channels under News Corporation ownership—FX, FX Movie Channel and National Geographic—through Disney's 2019 purchase of 21st Century Fox's film and non-broadcast, entertainment-based television assets.) The sale to Disney included ownership of Saban Entertainment, including most of the Fox Kids programming library, ironically resulting in the Fox Broadcasting Company losing the rights to its own children's programming to the owner of one of its network competitors, ABC (which Disney had purchased in February 1996, through its acquisition of the network's corporate parent Capital Cities/ABC, which changed its corporate name to ABC, Inc. upon becoming a Disney subsidiary; Fox would subsequently enter into an outsourcing agreement with 4Kids Entertainment to produce its children's programming blocks, a relationship that lasted until December 2008, when the network discontinued its remaining Saturday morning block, 4Kids TV). The sale was completed on October 24, 2001.

On November 10, 2001, the channel was renamed ABC Family; the on-air look that it adopted in its final year under Murdoch/Saban ownership as Fox Family was modified for the newly rebranded network in the meantime (including its logo, which was altered to swap out the vertically aligned Fox wordmark placed on the left parenthetical fringe with ABC's legacy "circle" logo, and production music), although it would begin using new continuity announcers. The network also revamped its programming lineup following the Disney acquisition. Partly to reduce competition with new sister network Disney Channel, which launched one year and nine months after what was then CBN Cable adopted a family-focused entertainment format, the network heavily scaled back the amount of children's programming on its schedule, relegating the handful of programs that were retained to the morning hours. With this, the remaining Fox Kids shows that were on ABC Family's schedule became part of the "ABC Family Action Block", a new two-hour-long block of action-oriented animated series (which was renamed "Jetix" in February 2004) that aired on weekday mornings, shows aimed at a broader family audience as well as those aimed specifically at teenagers, adults or both audiences also replaced the more kid-oriented shows in afternoon timeslots (Disney Channel simultaneously underwent its own demographic shift, dropping its remaining family-oriented programming with the September 2002 removal of its nightly vintage programming block, Vault Disney, in order to focus firmly on children and younger teenagers, a demographic it began gravitating toward when it transitioned into a basic cable channel in April 1997). The network also relocated its operations to The Walt Disney Company's headquarters in the Los Angeles suburb of Burbank, California.

Production responsibilities for the network's baseball playoff coverage that originated during its run as Fox Family were assumed by another of ABC Family's new sister networks, ESPN. While Division Series games remained on ABC Family for one additional year due to contractual issues, the regular season game telecasts migrated to ESPN outright beginning with the 2002 Major League Baseball season. A deal was later struck to move the playoff games to ESPN as well, starting with the 2003 season. Although the games aired on Disney-owned networks, Fox retained the exclusive right to negotiate a renewal of the contract after the 2006 season; Fox Sports chose not to renew the Division Series contract, with TBS acquiring those rights in 2007 as part of its new baseball contract.

The channel's sale to Disney, however, would be considered one of the biggest strategic errors made during the latter years of Michael Eisner's tenure as president of the company. No one within ABC's management staff was consulted by Walt Disney Company executives about the company's plans to purchase Fox Family, with the acquisition being conducted by Disney's strategic planning department. The company's original plan for the channel was to use it for the primary purpose of showing reruns of ABC programming; however, this was conceptually impossible as ABC did not hold the syndication rights to the majority of its own programs, with the exception of those that were produced by its corporate parent's television production divisions, Walt Disney Television and Touchstone Television, which had their distribution rights held by Buena Vista Television. During this time, the channel did air same-season repeats of then-current ABC shows Alias, Less than Perfect, and Life with Bonnie, almost all of which were produced by Touchstone Television. The network was also used as a buffer to burn off series which failed to gain audiences during their runs on ABC, such as the reality competition series All American Girl, which featured ex-Spice Girl Geri Halliwell.

Second and final logo as ABC Family, used from September 1, 2003, to January 11, 2016

In trying to change the programming focus of ABC Family, Disney also canceled several original series that originated on the channel under its former identity as Fox Family (such as the 1960s-set period dramedy State of Grace), and reduced the output of made-for-cable movies that were produced for the channel, which were among the few programs that Fox Family was doing well with. The changes cause ABC Family's ratings to tumble further as it became dependent on syndicated reruns, with no original programs on its schedule to back it up (with the exception of original wraparound segments that aired around repeats of The Bachelor, and children's programming).

Another plan drafted by Disney was to re-position the channel to market it at a more hip audience, such as college students or young women, and rename it "XYZ," a reverse reference to ABC; however, this concept was ultimately dropped. The decision not to move forward with the "XYZ" rebranding had been rumored to be due to the stipulation reported to have been put in place within International Family Entertainment's original sale agreement to News Corporation by Pat Robertson that the word "Family" must be contained in the name of the channel for the entirety of its existence, no matter the owner. The "XYZ" branding was revisited at one point in 2003, for a program block titled "The XYZ", which featured live-action series and movies aimed at teenagers and young adults, a demographic that the channel would eventually choose to market its programming towards.

Disney also inherited the contractual rights to broadcast select CBN programs, as mandated by the ministry under International Family Entertainment's previous sale agreement with Fox. However, ABC Family would move to distance itself from The 700 Club out of concern over potential viewer blowback following a series of controversial remarks made by Robertson on the program in the years following the channel's purchase by Disney about the government of Venezuelan president Hugo Chávez, as well as those regarding homosexuals, feminists, Muslims, abortion and many other social issues. On August 29, 2005, the disclaimers that appear before, during and after its broadcasts of The 700 Club were revised from "The following/preceding program is/was brought to you by CBN" to "The following/preceding CBN telecast does not reflect the views of ABC Family."

Disney would later make attempts to reach an agreement with Pat Robertson to buy out CBN's time-buy contract for The 700 Club and The 700 Club Interactive. Months prior to the announcement of the Freeform rebranding in 2015, Disney–ABC offered CBN a payment of $42 million – the same amount that the ministry earned in revenue during that year from syndication fees for The 700 Club and various related productions – for Robertson to terminate the channel's agreement with the ministry, but could not agree to terms as Robertson wanted a higher payout that ABC Family president Ascheim deemed "astronomical" in comparison to its actual value. The distancing of the two entities extends further as the channel's management does not regularly discuss their programming strategy with CBN, nor has the channel actively promoted its airings of The 700 Club or the associated talk shows that have preceded it in its initial morning time slot since News Corporation acquired the channel years prior, either on-air or on its website.

=== "A New Kind of Family" ===
In August 2006, ABC Family shifted towards a dual audience once more with teenagers and young adults becoming the primary target demographic of its programming. As part of the shift, the channel introduced a new slogan ("A New Kind of Family") as part of an imaging package that incorporated a custom typeface based on that used in the ABC logo for its promotional graphics.

The network's programming became focused upon original drama and comedy series primarily aimed at teenagers and young adults, acquired sitcoms and drama series from the 1990s onward, and movies aimed at its new demographic focus; even still, it continued to include programs catering to families in the form of feature films aired as part of its prime time and weekend movie blocks, and holiday specials featured as part of the seasonal "13 Nights of Halloween" and the "25 Days of Christmas" blocks. However, despite the network's refocusing towards the latter demographic, ABC Family/Freeform continues to air live and repeat broadcasts of The 700 Club every weekday.

Jetix remained part of ABC Family's morning schedule until it was discontinued on August 31 of that year, with the block becoming exclusive to Toon Disney beginning on September 2, effectively removing children's programming from ABC Family altogether (programs targeted at that demographic have largely remained off of its lineup since that point). Repeats of acquired off-network programs began to fill the 7:00 to 9:00 a.m. Eastern Time period formerly occupied by Jetix, with the morning airing of the 700 Club/Living the Life block being pushed back a half-hour further to 9:30 a.m. Eastern Time (the former two-hour slot was occupied entirely by sitcoms until 2015, when it switched to a mix of comedy and drama series in that period and the succeeding 9:00 a.m. Eastern half-hour, which had been occupied by sitcom reruns since the launch of Jetix).

As part of the rebranding, ABC Family re-strategized to increase its viewership by ramping up production of its original movies and series. The channel began experiencing relative success in 2006, with the debuts of the drama series Wildfire and Lincoln Heights. Further success came in 2007, with the fantasy drama Kyle XY (centering on a humanoid taken in by a suburban family, who tries to discover his identity), which earned the highest viewership in the network's history; that same year also saw another freshman series, the college-set dramedy Greek (centering on the relationships between groups of fraternity and sorority members), pull in strong ratings. The viewership record set by Kyle XY was later broken by the series premiere of the teen drama The Secret Life of the American Teenager (starring a then-unknown Shailene Woodley as a girl dealing with becoming a teenage mother, and the romantic lives of her friends and family) in 2008.

In July 2009, the network earned its best-ever ratings for that calendar month in prime time and in total viewership due to strong viewership posted by The Secret Life of the American Teenager for its sophomore season and the debuts of three new series: the gymnastics-centered freshman drama Make It or Break It, and sitcoms 10 Things I Hate About You (based on the 1999 film of the same name) and Ruby & The Rockits (intended in part to serve as a starring vehicle for David Cassidy, whose brother, Shaun Cassidy, served as one of its executive producers); the strong ratings were also buoyed by its broadcast of extended cuts of films from the Harry Potter franchise and the television premiere of Labor Pains. However, the channel continually struggled to launch a successful comedy series, with many of the sitcoms that debuted from 2008 to 2012 (including Roommates, State of Georgia and Ruby and the Rockits) not lasting more than one season and 10 Things I Hate About You being one of the only comedies among that crop to even be renewed for a second season.

The year 2010 saw the debut of its most successful original series, the drama Pretty Little Liars, which is based on the series of young adult mystery novels by Sara Shepard; the program successfully broke series premiere ratings records for ABC Family, across all major viewing demographics of women and young people, premiering to an audience of 3.1 million viewers on June 8 of that year. The show's success led to the development of two shorter-lived series based on Shepard's young adult novels, The Lying Game (which ran from 2011 to 2013) and Ravenswood (which aired for one season from 2013 to 2014). That summer also saw the debut of its first comedy hit, Melissa & Joey (a domestic sitcom in the vein of Who's the Boss? that starred former teen stars Melissa Joan Hart and Joey Lawrence, who previously co-starred in the 2009 ABC Family original movie Holiday in Handcuffs, as a city councilwoman raising her imprisoned brother's teenage children and the stockbroker she hired to serve as their housekeeper); the series would become the first original sitcom in the network's history to get a third season renewal and ended its run in May 2015 as the first original series in the channel's history to reach 100 episodes.

On June 6, 2011, the channel broke total and demographic viewership records again with the series premiere of the drama Switched at Birth (centering on two teenagers whose families are brought together after the discovery of their accidental placement under different parents following their birth), which was watched by 3.3 million viewers. ABC Family followed the success it had with Melissa & Joey with the June 2012 debut of Baby Daddy. In January 2013, the Jennifer Lopez-produced alternative family drama The Fosters spurred audience interest, premiering to 3.1 million viewers; the series also saw critical acclaim for its portrayal of the struggles of an interracial lesbian couple with five adopted at-risk youths.

== Freeform (2016–present) ==
First logo as Freeform, used from January 12, 2016, to March 5, 2018

The shift towards a more teen and young adult focus became more clear when Variety reported in a December 3, 2014, article, that ABC Family executives were proposing to relaunch the network as early as 2015, with options being considered including the expansion of programming appealing more toward young adults between the ages of 14 and 34 as opposed to families or teenagers, as well as adopting new branding (including a new name). On April 14, 2015, ABC Family executives announced during the channel's 2015–16 upfront presentation, that it would establish a firm focus on teenagers and young adults between the ages of 14 and 34 – a group representatives termed "becomers", instead of the standard "millennials", to describe young people who are in the "formation" of their lives, and to reflect a participatory experience for viewers across multiple platforms.

This culminated in the Disney–ABC Television Group's announcement on October 6, 2015, that the network would rebrand as Freeform. The move, which took effect on January 12, 2016, was motivated by audience testing that revealed that survey participants who watched ABC Family infrequently perceived it as being more family-oriented, in contrast to regular viewers who understood its focus towards the actual above-mentioned target demographic. However, the name – which was chosen among 3,000 proposals, was derided by some viewers on social media and news websites reporting on the pending rebrand, prompting Ascheim to note at the Television Critics Association Winter Press Tour on January 9, 2016, that while it does not mind the "wholesome" perception given by the "ABC Family" name, it does "not necessarily represent" the network. An extensive campaign to promote the rebrand began on the date of the announcement and encompassed the network's popular "13 Nights of Halloween" and "25 Days of Christmas" blocks during the fourth quarter of that year.

The rebrand was mainly cosmetic in nature, as the network retained much of the programming it ran under its previous ABC Family identity, with those being carried over under the new brand including the 25 Days of Christmas and 13 Days of Halloween blocks, and religious programming (including its weekday airings of The 700 Club). However, the channel planned to increase the amount of original programming on its schedule through 2020. The rebranding would coincide with the second half of the sixth season of Pretty Little Liars, and the series premiere of Shadowhunters, a fantasy drama based on Cassandra Clare's novel series The Mortal Instruments.

The retention of The 700 Club and The 700 Club Interactive on its lineup was particularly notable – even though the socially conservative views that have been expressed during the programs conflict with the culturally progressive/adult content of some of the channel's secular programming – as network executives were unable to reach an agreement with Pat Robertson and CBN to terminate the ministry's time-buy contract with the channel. While meeting to negotiate a buy out of the programming agreement prior to the rebranding announcement, Robertson had declined a $42-million termination offer by Disney–ABC (an amount roughly equivalent to the ministry's earnings from syndication fees for The 700 Club and various related productions during 2015) and stipulated a higher payout that Ascheim deemed "astronomical" in comparison to its actual value. The contrasting viewpoints of Freeform and The 700 Club led to Freeform airing disclaimers before airings, in some instances making snarky remarks in said warnings. One 2021 example reads "Freeform is not responsible for what's about to appear on your screen. Watch or don't watch. We're OK either way."

On April 7, 2016, Freeform ordered a series from ABC Signature and Marvel Television based on the comic book series Cloak and Dagger, marking the first work in the Marvel Cinematic Universe to have been developed for the network. Marvel Television had a Cloak and Dagger and Mockingbird-based series in development for the network as early as 2011. Freeform also announced several new non-scripted productions in development, including Later Bitches, a new late-night talk show produced by The Daily Show alumni Jen Flanz and Elise Terrel, an untitled late-night talk show starring Iliza Shlesinger, and Snapshots—a series of pop culture-oriented documentaries co-produced by ESPN Films. Shlesinger's new show, Truth & Iliza, premiered on May 2, 2017.

On December 14, 2017, in a historic deal valued at over $52 billion, The Walt Disney Company announced it will buy the majority of 21st Century Fox, bringing Freeform reunited under common ownership with 20th Century Fox and FX Networks after 16 years.

=== "A Little Forward" ===
Second Freeform logo, used from March 6, 2018, to September 11, 2022

On January 18, 2018, Freeform unveiled a new logo and slogan, "A Little Forward", and officially rebranded on March 6, 2018. The new slogan reflects refinements to the network's programming direction, with a larger focus on "forward-looking" series (such as The Bold Type and the Black-ish spin-off Grown-ish). Tom Ascheim explained that with the rebranding, Freeform was "purposefully and passionately moving our brand forward by defying expectations and dismantling conventions; busting stereotypes of theme, cast and culture in service to a more inclusive world on and off screen." The network also unveiled upcoming series in development, such as Scott Stewart's Augs, as well as a new trailer and June 7, 2018, premiere date for Marvel's Cloak and Dagger.

On November 26, 2018, Freeform's president Karey Burke was promoted to president of the ABC Entertainment Group to replace the outgoing Channing Dungey. Burke's replacement at Freeform will be determined at a later date. On March 27, 2019, Freeform announced that the channel was placing two animated series into development, Betches and Woman World, the first animated series since changing its name from ABC Family.

On June 4, 2018, Freeform canceled Shadowhunters after three seasons. The two-part series finale aired on May 6, 2019. On September 27, 2019, Freeform canceled Pretty Little Liars: The Perfectionists after one season. On October 24, 2019, Freeform canceled Marvel's Cloak & Dagger after two seasons.

On November 26, 2018, Freeform's president Karey Burke was promoted to president of the ABC Entertainment Group to replace the outgoing Channing Dungey. Burke's replacement at Freeform was to be determined at a later date. On March 27, 2019, Freeform announced that the channel was placing two animated series into development called Betches and Woman World. These were the network's first original animated series since changing its name from ABC Family, and served as the foundation of a female-oriented animation block.

=== Shift of programming towards Hulu and problems with Spectrum ===
In May 2020, former Netflix executive Tara Duncan—who was signed to an overall deal with sister streaming service Hulu in April 2020—became the new president of Freeform, replacing the departing Ascheim (who left to join Warner Bros. Kids, Young Adults and Classics).

In April 2022, the network began a larger expansion into non-scripted programming, announcing the projects Day to Night (later retitled The Come Up), Dear Pony: Keep This Between Us —a documentary on child grooming in American high schools, and The Deep End—a documentary on Teal Swan.

On September 12, 2022, Freeform underwent a second rebranding initiated by Duncan and designed by Collins, which launched alongside the premiere of The Come Up. The logo consists of a wordmark in modified Neue Haas Grotesk Text with curved cut-outs in its "F" lettering, intended to create illusory motions; Freeform's senior vice president of content marketing Joe Ortiz explained that the designs were intended to reflect "the ability to change and an openness to change", and "[create] a sense we are never static and always growing."

On September 1, 2023, the carriage agreement between Disney and Charter expired due to the latter's request that Disney provide free access to Disney+ and ESPN+ for all of Charter's subscribers. Disney requested that Charter maintain temporary carriage of their TV networks during the negotiation period, but Charter declined. This resulted in a dark period that lasted 11 days, during which 15 million Spectrum TV customers lost access to Disney's TV networks.

On September 11, 2023, Charter and Disney agreed to a renewed carriage agreement, which allowed Spectrum TV customers to resume watching the Disney content that were originally promised in their subscription package. However, in addition to Freeform, BabyTV, FXX, FXM, Nat Geo Wild, Nat Geo Mundo, Disney Junior, and Disney XD were not restored. Though Disney emphasized that there would be no change to its commitment to the Freeform brand, some analysts expressed doubt about it remaining as a linear channel in future provider negotiations.

On June 26, 2025, Charter and Disney struck a new deal with Spectrum that they'll be adding Hulu's ad-supported tier and restore 8 networks that were dropped in 2023, which includes Freeform.

== See also ==
- Family Channel – a now-defunct Canadian premium/basic cable and satellite specialty channel that is unrelated to ABC Family/Freeform or its predecessors, and had previously sourced its American programming from Freeform sister network Disney Channel and its spinoffs until January 1, 2016
- ABC Spark – a now-defunct Canadian digital cable and satellite specialty channel owned by Corus Entertainment that serves as a domestic version of ABC Family/Freeform
