= Trucker (disambiguation) =

Trucker may refer to:

- Truck driver, a person employed as the driver of a truck
- Trucker (band), a rock and alternative country band from Lawrence, KS
- Truckers (2013 TV series), a 2013 drama television series on BBC One
- The first novel in The Nome Trilogy, a series of children's novels by Terry Pratchett
  - Truckers (1992 TV series), the UK television series based on the first book from The Nome Trilogy
- Trucker (film), a 2008 US feature film

== Other uses ==
- Drive-By Truckers, an alternative country and Southern rock band
- Trucker hat, a type of baseball cap
- Ice Road Truckers, a reality television series
- Space Truckers, a 1996 US feature film
