= American Tragedy =

American Tragedy may refer to:

== Books ==
- An American Tragedy, a 1925 novel by Theodore Dreiser
- Nuremberg and Vietnam: An American Tragedy, a 1970 nonfiction book by Telford Taylor
- American Tragedy: The Uncensored Story of the Simpson Defense, a 1996 nonfiction book by James Willwerth and Lawrence Schiller about the O. J. Simpson murder case
- American Tragedy: Kennedy, Johnson, and the Origins of the Vietnam War, a 2000 nonfiction book by David E. Kaiser

== Music ==
- The American Tragedy, an American rock band
- As I Lay Dying/American Tragedy, a 2002 split album by bands As I Lay Dying and American Tragedy
- American Tragedy (album), a 2011 album by rap-rock group Hollywood Undead
  - American Tragedy Redux, a 2011 remix album of the Hollywood Undead album American Tragedy

== Television, film and theater ==
- An American Tragedy (film), a 1931 Paramount film directed by Josef von Sternberg based on Dreiser's novel
- An American Tragedy (musical), a 1995 stage musical adaptation of Dreiser's novel
- An American Tragedy (opera), a 2005 adaptation of Dreiser's novel by Tobias Picker
- American Tragedy (film), a 2000 television miniseries about O.J. Simpson's trial based on the 1996 book
- Ruby Ridge: An American Tragedy, a 1996 mini-series about a 1992 siege in Idaho, US
- Scottsboro: An American Tragedy, a 2001 historical film about the Scottsboro Boys
