= Farmclub.com =

Television series

- Logo from the show and website
- Starring: Ali Landry; Matt Pinfield; The Beat Junkies
- Country of origin: United States
- Original language: English

Production
- Executive producers: Jimmy Iovine; Glenn Kaino; Audrey Morrissey; Andy Schuon
- Producer: Susie Lewis
- Running time: 55 minutes

Original release
- Network: USA Network
- Release: January 31, 2000 – June 15, 2001

Farmclub.com is an American television show that aired on USA Network. It was broadcast from January 31, 2000, to June 15, 2001. The show's content featured "it" musical artists of the moment and promoted unsigned bands through national exposure and website interaction, with such featured moments as the return of N.W.A., in which Snoop Dogg substituted for the late Eazy-E.

Farmclub.com signed artists to real record deals and put their albums out through partnerships with Interscope, Def Jam, Universal, and other labels. The unsigned artists were selected from viewer votes from their website of the same name. Hosted by model/actress and former Miss USA 1996 Ali Landry and former MTV VJ Matt Pinfield, the show's label signed artists such as British DJ Sonique, and rock bands Dynamite Hack and Sev. The exposure also helped other bands obtain mass audience appeal leading to subsequent record deals such as Dog Fashion Disco and heavy metal band Chimaira.

Farmclub.com had a short lived partnership with Extreme Championship Wrestling in late 2000.

== Artists who performed on Farmclub ==
- 20 Dead Flower Children
- 98 Degrees
- Alley Life
- The American Tragedy
- ...And You Will Know Us by the Trail of Dead
- At the Drive-In
- Audra & The Antidote
- Bad Religion
- Beanie Sigel
- Beck
- Black Eyed Peas ft Esthero
- Bloodhound Gang
- Bone Thugs-n-Harmony
- Busta Rhymes
- Cash Money Millionaires
- Cold
- Chimaira
- Creed
- Cypress Hill
- D12
- Disturbed
- DMX
- Dog Fashion Disco
- Dream
- Dragon Fire
- Dr. Dre
- Eastcide
- Eminem
- Eve
- Excon
- Gargantua Soul
- Godsmack
- Green Day
- Headstrong
- Incubus
- Invisibl Skratch Piklz
- Insolence
- IPS
- Jay-Z
- Ja Rule
- Jinxed
- Kid Rock
- Kittie
- Korn
- Lil' Kim
- Limp Bizkit
- Linkin Park
- LL Cool J
- MDFMK
- Method Man
- Methods of Mayhem
- [minus], later known as [Minus.Driver] after signing with Universal.
- Monster Zero
- Moisture
- Mýa
- Mystikal
- MxPx
- Nelly
- The New System (Nik Sharp & Eric Bice of Suburban Tragedy)
- Nickelback
- No Doubt
- N.W.A.
- Orgy
- Papa Roach
- P.O.D.
- Planting Seeds
- Powerman 5000
- Powderburn
- Primus
- Queens of the Stone Age
- Rapnexx
- RK aka the Fugitive
- Sev
- Sevendust
- Sloppy Meateaters
- Smash Mouth
- Sum 41
- Skycopter9
- Sonique
- Staind
- Static-X
- Steaknife
- Stereomud
- Stone Temple Pilots
- Stroke 9
- Sundaze
- System of a Down
- Spine
- Third Eye Blind
- Three Six Mafia
- Trucker
- U2
- U.P.O.
- Wu Tang Clan
- The Warbers

== Artists signed by Farmclub ==
- Alley Life – 1999
- Sonique – October 1999
- Deep Obsession – February 2000
- Sev – June 2000
- Fisher
- Dynamite Hack
- Moisture

== Music from the show ==
After the demise of the show from television, Farmclub.com continued to exist online and through the release of an album entitled Live and Unreleased from Farmclub.com.

Live and Unreleased from Farmclub.com

Live album by various artists
- Released: February 20, 2001 (North America)
- Recorded: 1998–2000
- Studio: United States
- Genres: Various, soundtrack
- Label: Hip-O

=== Track listing ===
1. N.W.A. – "Nuthin' But a "G" Thang"
2. Eminem – "The Real Slim Shady"
3. Limp Bizkit with Method Man – "N 2 Gether Now"
4. DMX – "Party Up"
5. Nelly – "Country Grammar (Hot...)"
6. Staind – "Mudshovel"
7. Mystikal – "Shake Ya Ass"
8. Ja Rule – "Between Me and You"
9. Powerman 5000 – "Nobody's Real"
10. Eve – "Love Is Blind"
11. Nickelback – "Leader of Men"
12. Mýa – "Case of the Ex"
13. D12 – "Shit on You"
14. SEV – "Same Old Song"
15. ...And You Will Know Us by the Trail of Dead – "Richter Scale Madness"
16. Bionic Jive – "Pump"
17. Cinder – "Soul Creation"
