= Minus.Driver =

American nu metal band

[minus.driver]
- Also known as: [minus] (1996–2002)
- Origin: Atlanta, Georgia, US
- Genres: Alternative rock; nu metal; post-hardcore
- Years active: 1996-2003
- Labels: Nuclear Family; Republic; Universal
- Past members: Jordan Williams; Lee March; Dustin Kirchner; Matt Donald

Minus.Driver (stylized as [minus.driver]), formerly known as [minus], is an American nu metal band from Atlanta, Georgia, formed in 1996.

As Minus, the band has only one studio album on their label Nuclear Family Entertainment, Structure of Simplicity, released in 2001. They would receive exposure by performing on the short-lived Farmclub.com, alongside with Incubus.

They were threatened legal action, leading them to change into the name "Minus.Driver". Around November 2002, they were signed into Universal Records, where they recorded a five-song EP. In August of 2003, they released A Message for You, which would be their final release before they would eventually part ways.

On September 15, 2022, drummer Matt Donald was hospitalized after being mysteriously attacked in a parking lot near a walking trail in Roswell, Georgia.

== Band members ==
Final lineup

- Jordan Williams — vocals
- Lee March — bass
- Dustin Kirchner — guitar
- Matt Donald — drums

== Discography ==
As [minus]

- Structure of Simplicity (2001)

As [minus.driver]

- A Message for You EP (2003)
