= Trucker (band) =

Trucker is a rock band that was formed in 1995 and is based in Lawrence, Kansas, United States. In 2000, Trucker was interviewed and performed on the nationally televised show Farmclub; which was an hour-long program created by Universal Music Group and broadcast during primetime on the USA Network. Trucker performed alongside Enrique Iglesias and the Bloodhound Gang during the episode which aired April 24, 2000.

In 2010, Trucker won the first phase of the Sennheiser HearIAm music campaign and received a prize package (valued at nearly $20,000) that included a performance slot at Montreal's Osheaga Festival; with a record crowd of over 50,000.

== Accomplishments ==
- Winner of the first phase of the Sennheiser HearIAm Campaign(2010)
- Single "One Good Saturday" featured on the emerging artist segment of Coast to Coast AM (2009)
- Members Todd Johnson and Josh Basnett selected as NBC’s Nashville Star finalists (2008)
- Album "Post Rock Motel" placed on Grammy Pre-ballot (2007)
- Single “Make Peace” selected for MTV documentary (2007)
- Winner of the first annual Deadwood Derby unsigned band competition (2006)
- Todd Johnson selected by Rolling Stone Magazine to attend the David Fishof R’n’R Fantasy Camp (2003)
- Named a top 50 qualifier for the Coca-Cola New Music Award two years in a row by the AMA and the CMJ (2002 and 2003)
- Selected by CMJ as a Regional Semi-Finalist for the Next Great Band Competition (2002)
- Awarded B.E.A.M. Grant from Jim Beam as an up-and-coming artist to watch (2000)
- Performed on nationally televised USA Network show Farmclub (2000)

== Band members ==
=== Current ===
- Todd Johnson (Olathe, KS) – lead vocals and rhythm guitar (1995–present)
- Thomas Barletta (Canton, CT) – drums (1995–2012)
- Greg Barry (Quincy, IL) – bass guitar (2005–2012)
- Josh Basnett (Tulsa, OK) – lead guitar and backing vocals (2005–2012)
- Hank Rishcar (Quincy, IL) – lead keyboard and backing vocals (2007–2012)
- Kevin Powell (Lawrence, KS) – backing keyboard, backing vocals and auxiliary percussion (2005–2012)

=== Former ===
- Wayne Rasmuss – bass guitar (1997–2003)

== Discography ==
=== Albums ===
- Go Out (2000)
- Nothing To See Here (2003)
- Feeling Better Today (2006)
- Post Rock Motel (2006)
- Hello Amero (2008)
- New Single Fridays (2010)
- al fine (2012)

=== Singles ===
- "Better to Be" (1996)
- "Chosen by God" (2003)
- "The Neighbor Song" (2003)
- "New Single Fridays" (2009–2010)
- "Grow Away" (December 2009)
- "Crumpled Happy" (January 2010)
- "Such a Girl" (February 2010)
- "And It's Late" (March 2010)
- "Endlessly" (April 2010)
- "In the Mourning" (May 2010)
- "Doscha" (June 2010)
- "Super Double Agent" (July 2010)
- "Bloodied and Drugged" (August 2010)
