= Emma (TV series) =

- Genre: Music
- Presented by: Emma Bunton
- Opening theme: "What I Am" by Tin Tin Out and Emma Bunton
- Country of origin: United Kingdom
- Original language: English
- No. of seasons: 1
- No. of episodes: 5

Production
- Running time: 60 minutes
- Production company: VH1

Original release
- Network: VH1
- Release: 8 October – 5 November 1999

Emma (stylized as EMMA) is a VH1 music video programme hosted by Emma Bunton.

== Background ==
After Geri Halliwell's departure, the Spice Girls had a hiatus in 1999. The other members started their solo careers in music, but Bunton devoted to other projects and signed with VH1 to present her own show, becoming a VJ. The show was announced in 12 August and aired originally in October 8, with five weekly episodes. A premiere party was held on 28 September. The programme follows a similar format to that of 120 Minutes, which aired on MTV. Bunton introduced her favorite music videos and read fans' e-mail. With 60 minutes, the show was aired on Fridays 6 pm. After the original screening VH1 wanted to sign a long-term programme with Bunton, but she declined, focusing on her group's new album.

== Episodes ==
No.	Title	Original release date
1	"One"	8 October 1999
2	"Two"	15 October 1999
3	"Three"	22 October 1999
4	"Four"	29 October 1999
5	"Final"	5 November 1999
