= History of WWE SmackDown =

History of the WWE professional wrestling television show SmackDown

The history of WWF/E SmackDown, began with the show's debut on August 26, 1999, in Kansas City, Missouri. The show was originally broadcast on Thursday nights but moved to Friday on September 9, 2005, before returning to Thursdays on January 15, 2015. On July 19, 2016, it was moved to Tuesday Nights. SmackDown! debuted in the United States on the UPN television network on April 29, 1999, but after the merger of UPN and the WB, SmackDown! began airing on The CW in September 2006. The show was moved to MyNetworkTV in October 2008, to Syfy on October 1, 2010 and to USA Network on January 7, 2016.

In its WWF/E SmackDown! history, SmackDown has been broadcast from more than 162 arenas, in more than 147 cities and towns, and in nine countries (the United States, Canada, the United Kingdom, Iraq in 2003 and 2004 for Tribute to the Troops, Japan in 2005, Italy in 2007, Mexico in 2011, and France and Saudi Arabia in 2024). Prior to switching to the current live format, taped episodes premiered a few hours earlier in Ireland and the United Kingdom and a day earlier in Australia, Canada, and Singapore than the United States, due to time differences. The show celebrated its 15th anniversary on October 10, 2014, and its 1,000th episode on October 16, 2018.

== Original format (1999–2001) ==
The first SmackDown! logo used from April 29, 1999, to August 9, 2001.

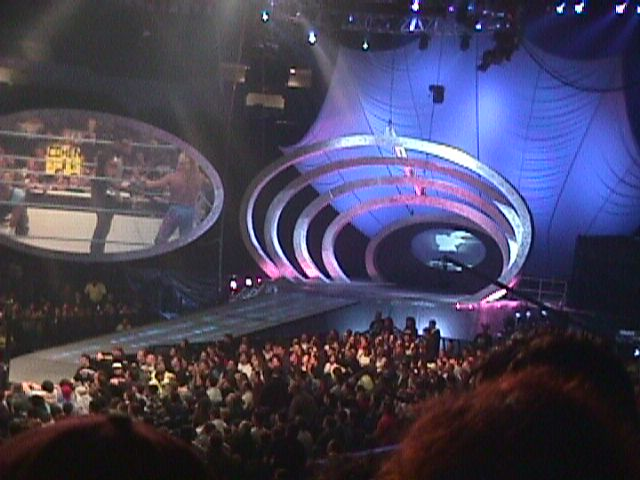
The official set used from the show's debut from August 26, 1999, until August 9, 2001

The early set included an oval-shaped TitanTron entrance and stage (dubbed the "Ovaltron") which made it stand out from the Raw set with its rectangular Titantrons. Later productions gained the ability to move the Ovaltron either to the left or to the right of the stage. Throughout the show's early existence, The Rock routinely called SmackDown! "his show", in reference to the fact that the name was derived from one of his catchphrases, "Lay the smackdown". In August 2001, as part of celebrating SmackDown!'s 2nd anniversary, the show received a new logo and set. The last SmackDown! to use the previous entrance stage was the August 9, 2001, episode, which saw Alliance member Rhyno gore WWF Team member Chris Jericho through the center screen, destroying part of the set. As a result of that incident, a new set debuted the following week and it consisted of a fist centered above the entrance, and many glass panes along the sides strongly resembling shattered glass.

== Brand extension (2002–2005) ==
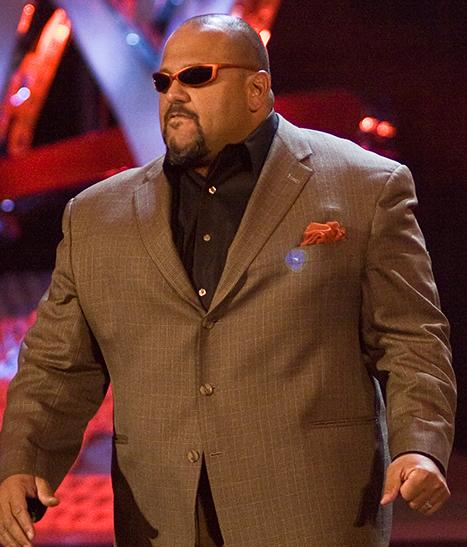
Tazz was a SmackDown commentator from February 2001 to November 2001, from April 2002 to June 2006, and from August 2008 to April 2009.

In March 2002, WWE underwent the "brand extension", a process in which WWE divided itself into two branches. The two divisions, Raw and SmackDown!, would compete against each other. The brand extension was made public during a telecast of Raw on March 18, 2002, and became official on the April 1, 2002, episode of Raw. Michael Cole was joined in commentary by Tazz on April 4, 2002, until June 9, 2006. Cole and Tazz also appeared as the commentators on February 22, 2001, through June 28, 2001, and August 2, 2001, through November 15, 2001.

WWE's "lame duck" status with Viacom on Spike TV may have prompted UPN to move SmackDown! to the Friday night death slot for the fall 2005 season. UPN received better ratings on Fridays than it did before with its movie night. In addition, UPN had been able to hold on to the ratings from Thursday nights, most notably with comedian Chris Rock's sitcom Everybody Hates Chris. In January 2006, UPN renewed SmackDown! for two more years. After Star Trek: Enterprise had been cancelled, SmackDown! moved into Enterprise's former timeslot. WWE promoted this move with the tagline "TV that's changing Friday nights." SmackDown! made its season premiere on September 9, 2005. The program still aired on Thursdays in Canada on the Score. In the United Kingdom, Ireland and Australia, their stations Sky Sports and Fox8 aired SmackDown! on Fridays before the United States due to the time difference. This was the first time a major weekly WWE show aired internationally before it hit screens in the United States. The events of Hurricane Katrina affected the first episode of SmackDown! in the United States due to the special fund-raising concert that aired on UPN at the same time that the first episode would have gone out, resulting in only the second hour of the show being shown on UPN, while the first hour was instead streamed from WWE's website. Other countries, including Canada, United Kingdom, Australia and the Philippines, received the full two-hour show. New York affiliate WWOR-TV and secondary affiliate WSWB (based in Northeastern Pennsylvania) also aired both hours of the show on tape delay on Saturday, due to the former's previous commitment to broadcast the New York Yankees on Friday nights and the latter's primary affiliation with The WB.

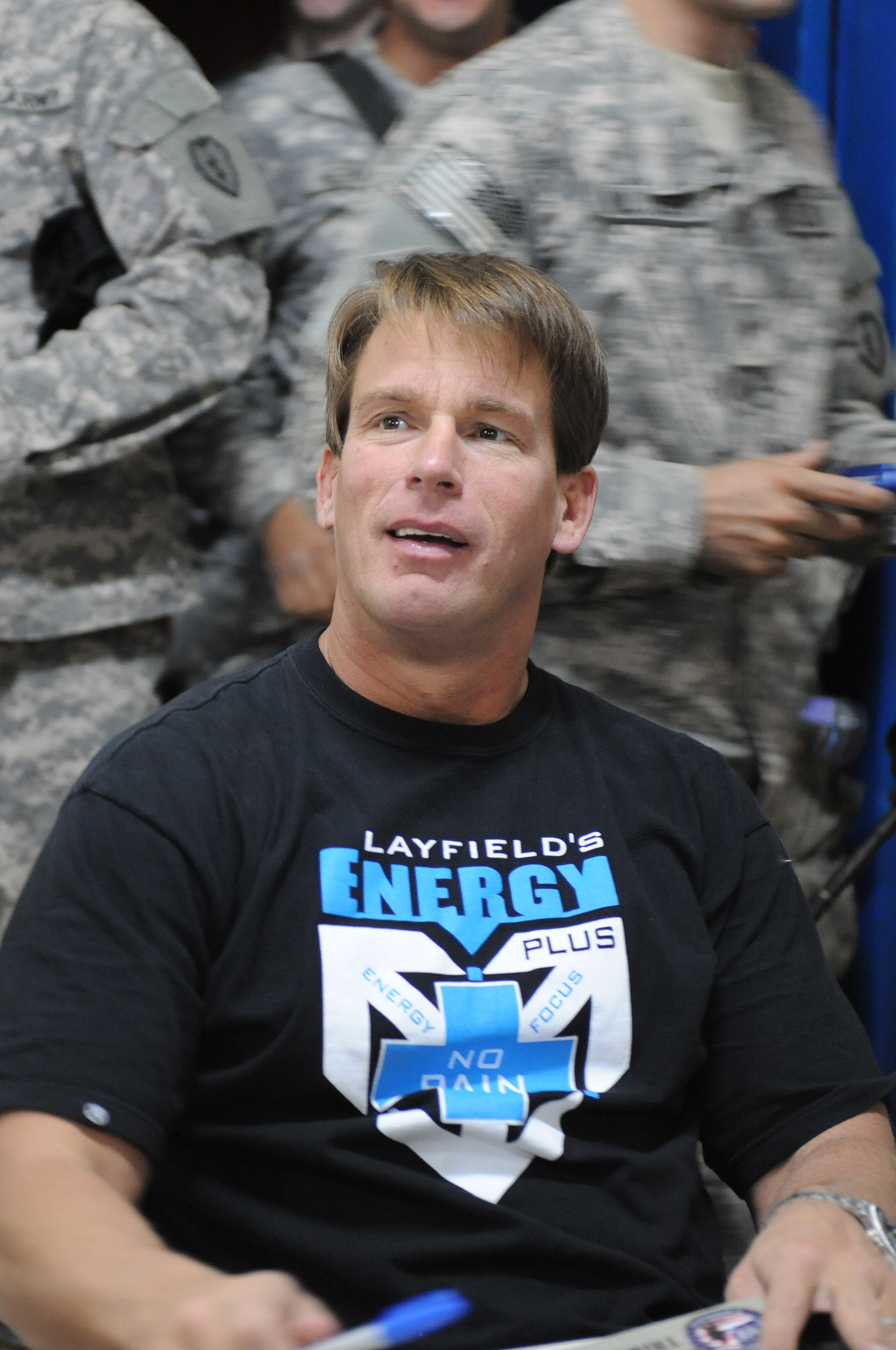
John "Bradshaw" Layfield who joined the broadcast team on SmackDown from June 16, 2006, until December 21, 2007; he made a return as a color commentator from October 12, 2012, until February 22, 2013, from March 22, 2013, until January 9, 2015, and since July 26, 2016, until August 29, 2017

On June 9, 2006, Tazz left the SmackDown! brand to join the new ECW brand, leaving the color commentator position vacant. However, on June 11, 2006, at ECW One Night Stand, Layfield revealed that he was the new color commentator for SmackDown!, a position he held until December 21, 2007, when he left to make his return as an in-ring competitor on Raw, and Jonathan Coachman replaced him afterwards. Eventually, Coachman was released by WWE the following year and replaced by Mick Foley.

== Changing channels (2006–2010) ==
=== The CW (2006–2008) ===
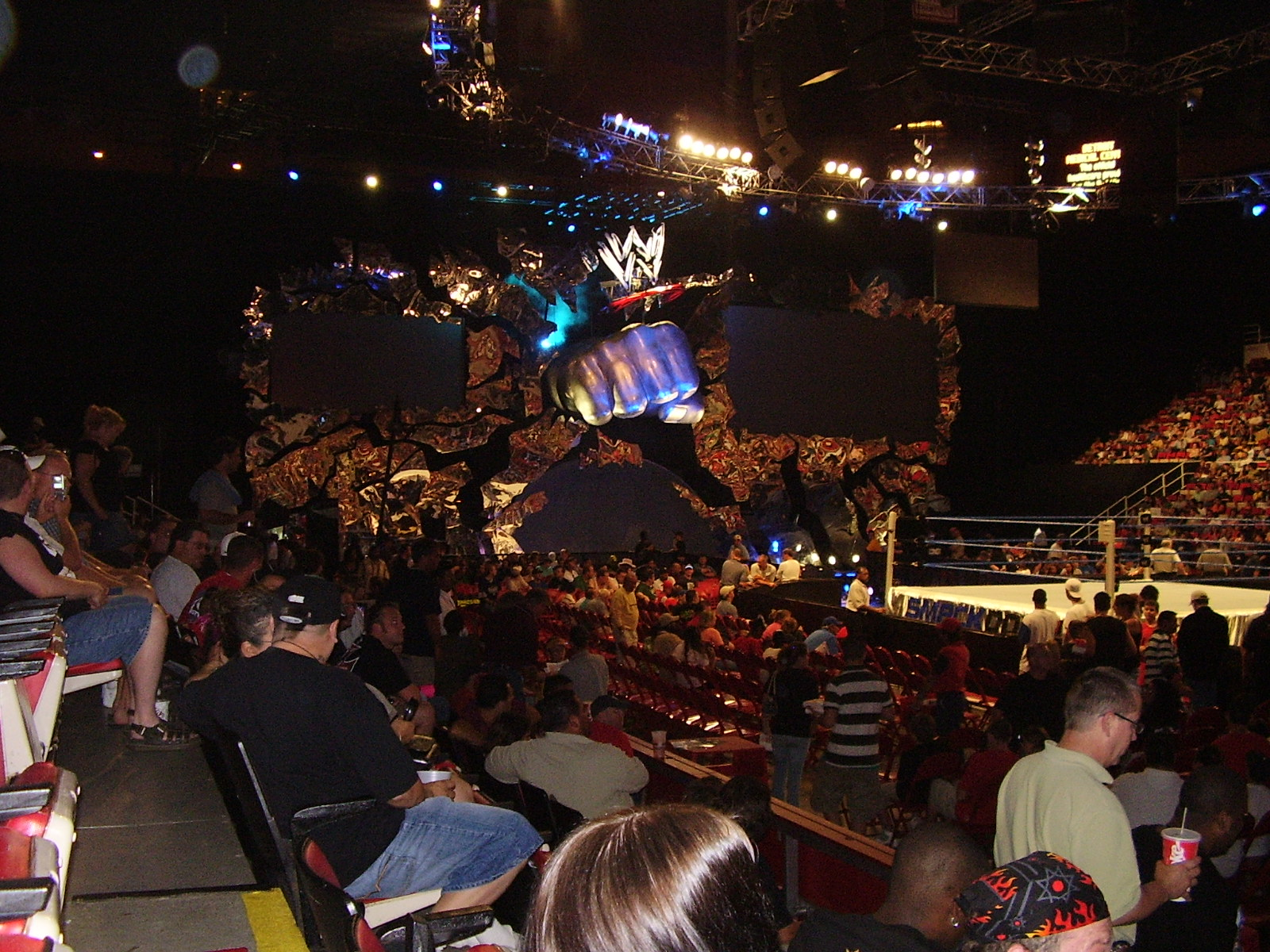
Variations of the SmackDown! fist and mirrors set were used from August 16, 2001, until January 18, 2008

On September 22, 2006, Friday Night SmackDown! debuted on The CW, a joint venture between CBS Corporation (owner of UPN) and Warner Bros. Entertainment (a subsidiary of Time Warner, majority owner of the WB Television Network). For four weeks before the official premiere of Friday Night SmackDown! on the CW, Tribune Broadcasting television stations in six major markets (including WPIX in New York City and KTLA in Los Angeles) aired WWE's Friday Night SmackDown!. This formed part of the preparation for the impending removal of UPN in several markets due to the debut of MyNetworkTV on September 5, 2006. Two other future affiliates of The CW, WCWJ in Jacksonville, Florida, and WIWB in Green Bay, Wisconsin, also aired Friday Night SmackDown! in early September. The transition to the CW caused an interruption in the broadcast of Friday Night SmackDown! in the state of Utah beginning in June when KPNZ in Salt Lake City stopped airing all UPN programs early. As of 2009, KUCW broadcasts the show. In Hawaii, Friday Night SmackDown! returned in late 2006, airing on a CW digital subchannel of Honolulu's Fox affiliate KHON-TV (Channel 2), which had received statewide carriage over Oceanic Time Warner Cable. Since the move to The CW, SmackDown! had shown a major increase in ratings to an average a 3.0 national rating. In addition, SmackDown! had become the second-highest watched program on The CW.

On April 20, 2007, SmackDown! celebrated its 400th episode. Ratings success soon followed as on June 8, 2007, SmackDown! made CW history by making a three-way tie with CBS and ABC in the key ad demographic (adults, 18–49) by drawing a 1.5 rating each. Two weeks later, on June 22, 2007, SmackDown! again made CW history by tying the network for first place in the key ad demographic (adults, 18–49) and being the second-most-watched network program at 9 p.m. for the night. The CW had not performed as well at any time slot since America's Next Top Model the previous March. The following week, on June 29, 2007, SmackDown! helped CW to claim the top spot in the key demographic (adults, 18–49) for Friday. CBS got the overall lead, but CW got top spot for the adults 18-49 by registering a 1.4 rating followed by CBS and NBC at 1.3, ABC at 1.2, and Fox at 0.9. Two weeks later, on Friday, July 13, 2007, SmackDown! made network history by placing first in the 18-49 demographic and becoming the most watched show at the 9 p.m. hour on network television. This was the first time anything has placed this well on CW. SmackDown! became a hit show on Friday nights winning the demographics for young males and ranking second on the demographics (18-49) for Friday nights.

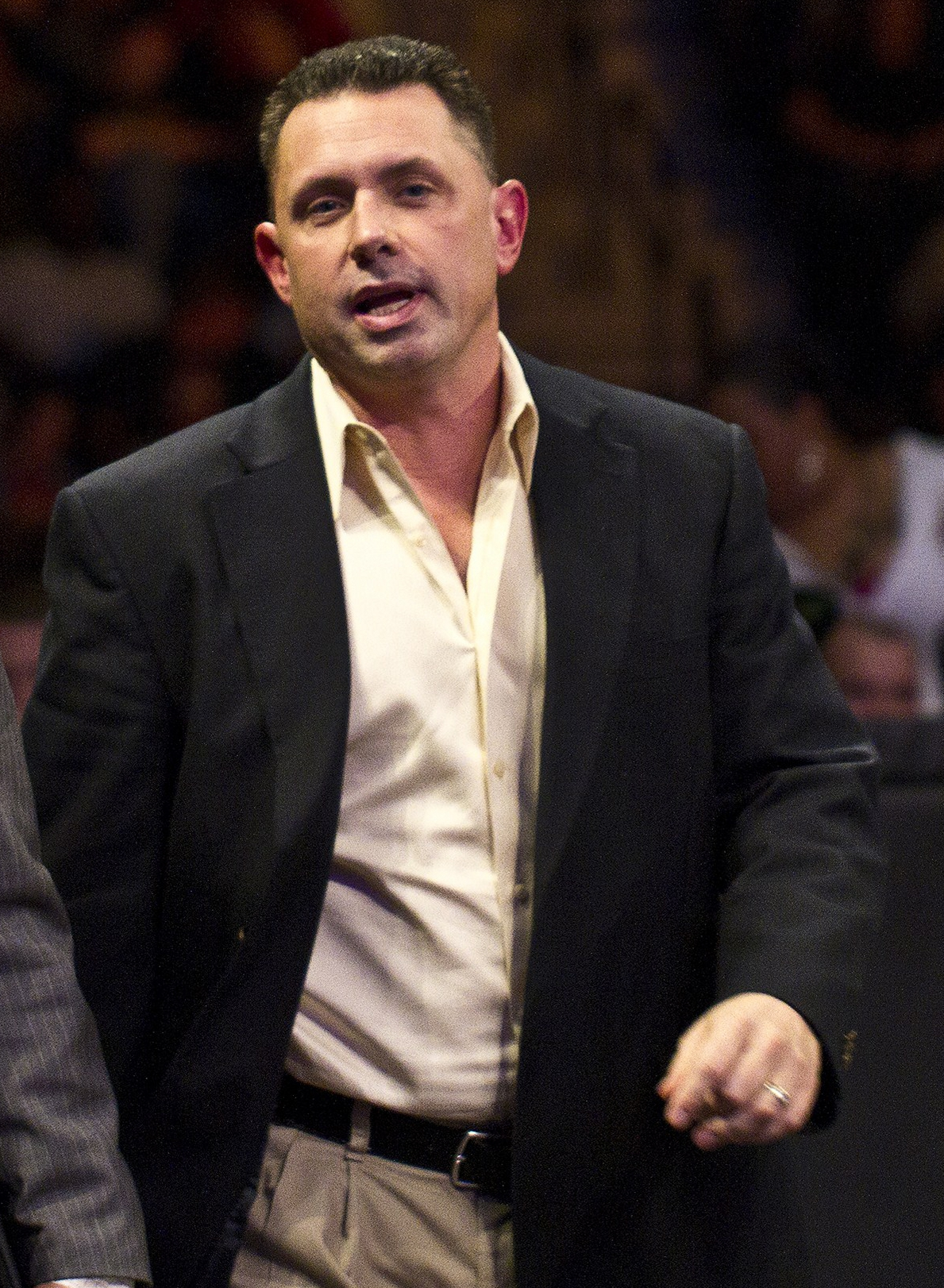
Michael Cole was a commentator on SmackDown from September 1999 to June 2008, from October 2010 until October 2012, from March 2013 until August 2014, from August 2014 until March 2015, and from January 2019 until August 2023.

Jim Ross became the new play-by-play announcer for SmackDown, while Michael Cole (SmackDown! commentator for nine years from its launch in 1999 until June 23, 2008) was drafted to Raw. In August 2008, Tazz returned to SmackDown as color commentator, due in part to Mick Foley's departure from WWE. A couple of months later, in late 2008, Tazz let his contract expire, so he was replaced by Todd Grisham, who was the color commentator on Raw.

=== MyNetworkTV (2008–2010) ===
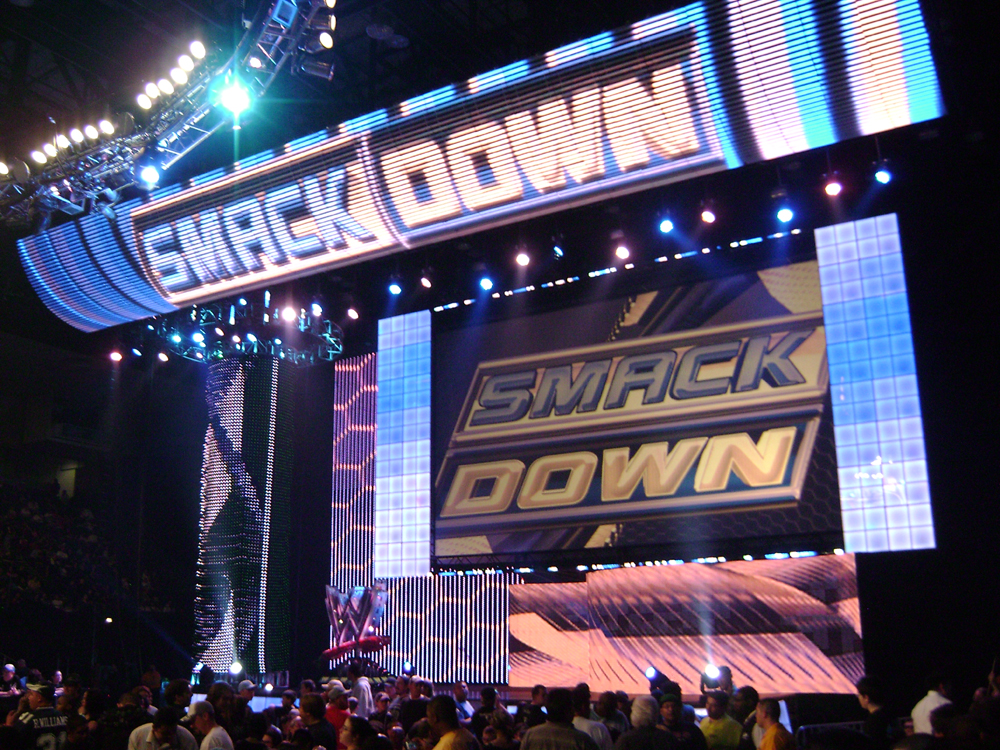
SmackDown's first version of the universal WWE HD set used from January 25, 2008, until July 20, 2012

SmackDown debuted on MyNetworkTV in the United States on October 3, 2008, featuring performers from the Raw, SmackDown and ECW brands. SmackDown also debuted with a new theme-song. The premiere episode on MyNetworkTV attracted 3.2 million viewers. While the viewership dropped, SmackDown pulled the highest ratings to date for MyNetworkTV and pushed the network to fifth place, ahead of its former network The CW. The premiere was also first place in male 18-49 demographics.

On March 20, 2009, SmackDown celebrated its 500th episode. On September 15, 2009, WWE Home Video released a DVD set entitled The Best of SmackDown 10th Anniversary. The SmackDown 10th Anniversary DVD which included the Top 100 moments in SmackDown history was hosted by Cole and Matt Striker. On April 19, 2010, the eruption of a volcano in Iceland left ash hovering over Europe and caused the grounding of many flights, leaving most of the Raw roster stranded in Belfast, Northern Ireland. To keep the audience from thinking that Raw was canceled for the night, SmackDown wrestlers (including Rey Mysterio, Edge, CM Punk, Chris Jericho) took over Raw. The episode is known as Monday Night SmackDown, although that title was never mentioned on air. On October 30, 2009, Todd Grisham was revealed as the new lead announcer for SmackDown, alongside Michael Cole for one night on October 16, 2009, and Matt Striker, a position he held until December 3, 2010, when he left to become the new lead announcer for NXT along with Josh Mathews.

== NBCUniversal (2010–2019) ==
=== Syfy and end of brand extension (2010–2015) ===
As made public on April 12, 2010, SmackDown moved to Syfy, which had previously aired NXT and ECW, in a two-year deal that included an optional third year. SmackDown made its live premiere on Syfy on October 1, 2010, retaining its Friday night timeslot. Prior to this premiere of SmackDown, Michael Cole hosted a "pre-game" show. According to the Los Angeles Times, the move saw Syfy paying close to $30 million for the show as opposed to the $20 million paid by its former network MyNetworkTV. The move also resulted in network, SmackDown being advertised more frequently on Syfy's sister network, USA Network, which airs Raw. Same week encores of SmackDown were also added to Universal HD's and mun2's Saturday night schedule as a result of the move in the spot previously held by NXT and ECW.

On December 10, 2010, the NXT color commentator Josh Mathews became the new lead announcer for SmackDown, a position he held until February 22, 2013, when he left to become the new color commentator the following week until May 24, 2013. On February 4, 2011, Booker T made a return on SmackDown as a commentator replacing Striker.

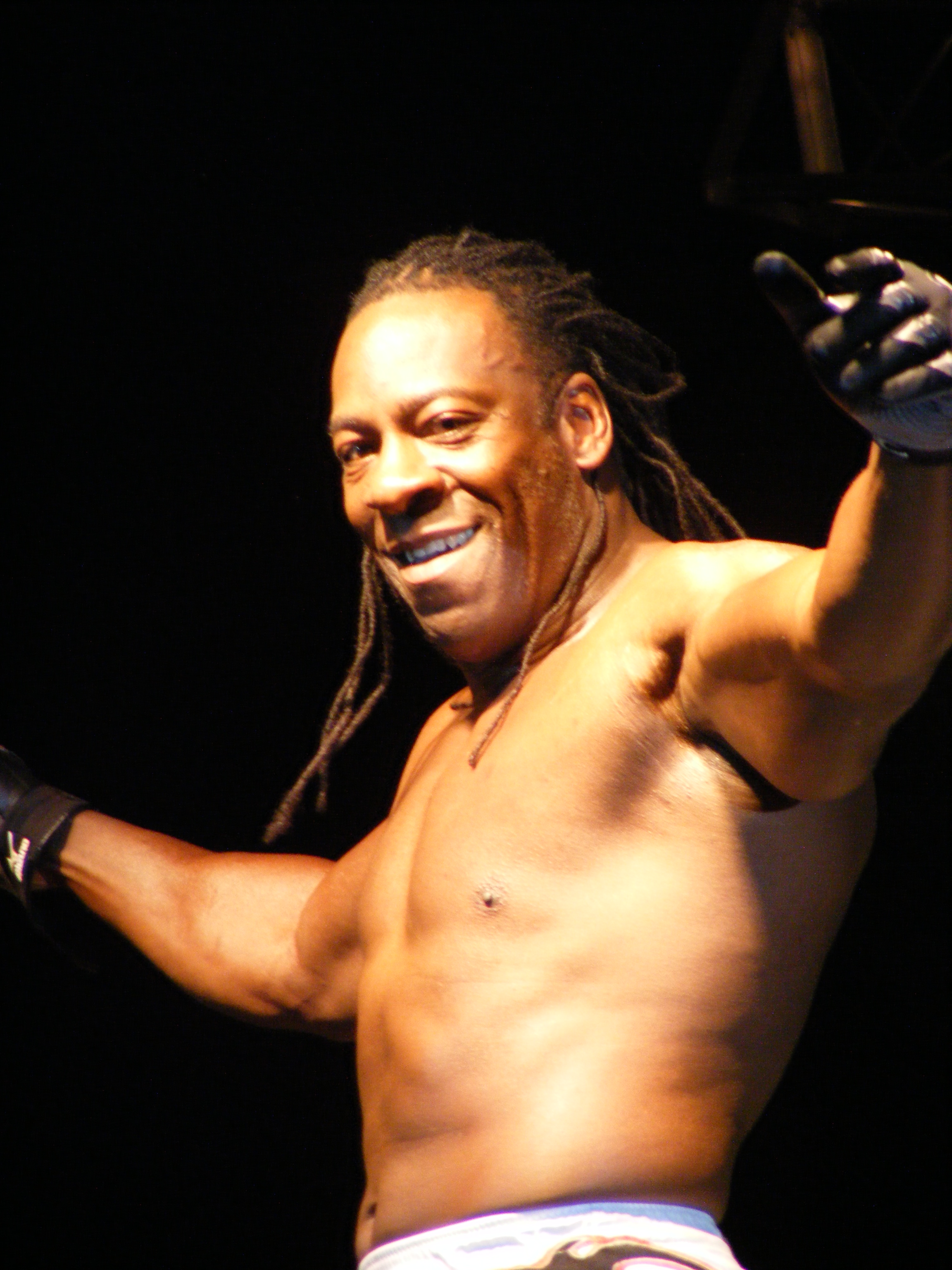
Booker T was a commentator on SmackDown from February 2011 to July 27, 2012, and again from September to December 2015.

In August 2011, the brand extension came to an end, resulting in Raw talent appearing on SmackDown and vice versa. In late 2011, Super SmackDown Live, a live episode of the show was broadcast on a Tuesday. The title was revived for future live episodes.

The October 14, 2011, episode made SmackDown the second-longest-running weekly episodic television series of American television history (behind Raw, which surpassed that mark on August 2, 2005). On April 1, 2012, at WrestleMania XXVIII, John Laurinaitis became general manager of both Raw and SmackDown after Team Johnny defeated Team Teddy. However, on June 17, 2012, at No Way Out, after Cena defeated Big Show in a steel cage match, Laurinaitis was fired by Mr. McMahon. On the August 3, 2012, episode of SmackDown, Mr. McMahon named Booker T the SmackDown General Manager. In addition, Booker named Long and Eve Torres as his assistants. John "Bradshaw" Layfield returned to WWE in September 2012 and became a commentator for the show as well. On January 18, 2013, SmackDown celebrated its 700th episode. Vickie Guerrero became general manager on July 19, 2013, but was fired the following year. The show is also run frequently by WWE chief operating officer Triple H. Past episodes of SmackDown are now viewable on the video streaming website Hulu along with episodes of Superstars and ECW. On October 10, 2014, SmackDown celebrated its 15th anniversary. The 15th season premiere opened with a new theme, "Centuries" by Fall Out Boy. To help celebrate the 15th anniversary, Stephanie McMahon came out first, then Laurinaitis and Long, respectively, the latter of which kept one-upping each other for the main event of the night until McMahon decided to keep the 15-man tag team match that Long suggested, on the condition Laurinaitis and Long be the captains of each team like at WrestleMania XXVIII. Long's team won the match. On December 16, 2014, SmackDown aired its 800th episode, which aired live on USA Network, featuring the main event between Dolph Ziggler and Seth Rollins.

=== Return to Thursday nights (2015) ===
The show's return to Thursday nights – something that was rumored as early as August 2014 – was made official by Syfy and WWE on November 6, 2014. The return to Thursday nights was expected to help attract a younger audience to Syfy, as well as more premium advertising dollars from marketers, who tend to spend more to promote their products, especially film releases, on the night as consumers head into the weekend. The last SmackDown airing on Friday nights had 2.43 million viewers with a 0.7 share.

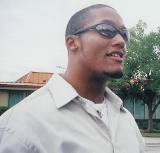
Byron Saxton who joined the broadcast team on SmackDown from January 15, 2015, until June 18, 2015, alongside Tom Phillips, Michael Cole and Jerry Lawler; he also appeared for one night on July 23, 2015, alongside Phillips and The Usos member Jimmy Uso, and made a return on January 7, 2016, along with Lawler, Cole for one night on February 18, 2016, and Mauro Ranallo, before taking time off due to a live prediction about the upcoming matches at WrestleMania 32 with Renee Young. He then moves to Raw commentary team once again after the broadcast on July 19, 2016.

After the broadcast on the finale of SmackDown, Layfield left SmackDown to join Raw, where he served as a commentator, alongside Cole and Booker T from January 5, 2015, to July 25, 2016, leaving the color-commentator position vacant. SmackDown returned to a Thursday night airing from the episode of January 15, 2015. Lawler joined the broadcast team for the move. He was to join the broadcast team in 2012 on SmackDown until he had a heart attack during the September 10, 2012, episode of Raw. WWE pay-per-view events kickoff analyst Byron Saxton also joined the broadcast team afterwards in the same episode. The broadcast saw a revised SmackDown logo and all new graphics with 2.68 million viewers with a 0.8 rating share. In a January 2015 interview, Daniel Bryan said he told WWE management that he wished to be the "face of SmackDown" to increase the show's viewership. The January 15, 2015, episode of SmackDown marked Bryan's return to the ring after months of being injured as he wrestled in the main event of the first five SmackDown episodes since the move back to Thursday airings. (Note: See external link reports from The Independent and Canoe.ca for episodes for January and February 2015.) On January 29, 2015, the special live episode of SmackDown was aired from XL Center in Hartford, Connecticut, after the January 2015 North American blizzard, postponement for live Raw and cancellation for SmackDown taping in Boston. The live episode had 2.95 million viewers with a 0.9 share; in the main event Daniel Bryan defeated Kane in a casket match. During WrestleMania week, Byron Saxton was absent at the time due to a live prediction about the upcoming matches at WrestleMania 31 with Renee Young. Tazz, Cole, Layfield and Booker T was recently absent during WrestleMania week in 2005, 2012 and 2013.

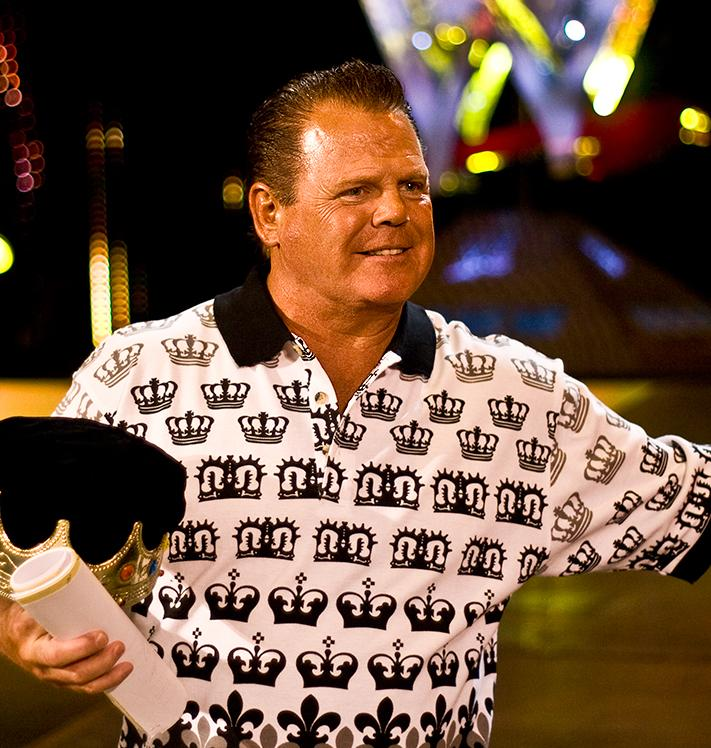
Jerry "The King" Lawler who joined the broadcast team on SmackDown on January 15, 2015, after hospitalization for diverticulitis; he also appeared during SmackDown aired on UPN from August 26, 1999, until February 22, 2001, November 22, 2001, until March 28, 2002, and for one night on March 31, 2005, October 23, 2009, March 1, and April 5, 2013. He had then left SmackDown commentary team after the broadcast on July 19, 2016.

On April 2, 2015, Tom Phillips stood in as lead announcer for Michael Cole, who was recovering from a kayfabe injury suffered at the hands of Brock Lesnar the previous week on Raw. Phillips' first air date as August 22, 2014, until January 9, 2015, during SmackDown aired on Fridays alongside Cole and Layfield. After Cole left SmackDown to join Raw as lead announcer during a tour of the United Kingdom on April 16, 2015, Phillips returned to SmackDown alongside Lawler and Saxton on the following week. After the broadcast on June 18, 2015, Phillips continued as lead announcer on SmackDown until August 20, 2015. In the same date, Byron Saxton left SmackDown to join Raw as a color commentator, along with Cole and Layfield since June 8, 2015, leaving the color commentator position vacant. However, on June 25, 2015, The Usos member Jimmy Uso revealed that he would be the new color commentator for SmackDown, a position he held until September 3, 2015, when he left to make his return as an in-ring competitor on SmackDown next week to team with Roman Reigns and Dean Ambrose in a six-man tag team match against WWE Tag Team Champions The New Day, and the color commentator on Main Event since August 25, 2015, before SmackDown taping. On August 27, 2015, NXT and Superstars lead announcer Rich Brennan replaced Phillips to join the broadcast team following Phillips' interview with WWE Superstars after the match in the backstage on WWE.com and WWE's exclusive YouTube channel. On September 10, 2015, the WWE pay-per-view events kickoff analyst and Hall of Famer Booker T once again made a return on SmackDown as a color commentator replacing Jimmy Uso. The last SmackDown airing on Syfy had 2.8 million viewers and was taped on December 29; in the main event Dean Ambrose and Roman Reigns defeated Kevin Owens and Sheamus by disqualification.

=== USA Network (2016) ===
On January 7, 2016, SmackDown started airing on USA Network. With the move, all top three WWE programs – Raw, SmackDown and Tough Enough – would air on the same network for the first time ever. According to Lawler, SmackDown may move back to Friday nights on USA Network and go live. There was a possibility that SmackDown may move to Tuesday nights on USA Network and go live. SmackDown remained on Thursday nights when the show moves from Syfy to USA Network on January 7. Coinciding with the premiere of SmackDown on USA Network, Rich Brennan was replaced by Mauro Ranallo, who is set to become the lead announcer, and Booker T was replaced by the current Raw and Superstars color commentator Byron Saxton, who is set to become the alternate color commentator. The first SmackDown episode on USA Network had 2.75 million viewers; in main event matches Charlotte defended the Divas Championship against Becky Lynch and Kevin Owens wrestled Intercontinental Champion Dean Ambrose to a double countout. When Mauro Ranallo suffered from influenza, current Raw lead commentator Michael Cole replaced him on February 18, 2016. That night's SmackDown episode marked the return of Brock Lesnar and then WWE World Heavyweight Champion Triple H during and after main event between Roman Reigns and Dean Ambrose against The Dudley Boyz (Bubba Ray and D-Von) in a tag team match. David Otunga temporarily replaced Jerry Lawler after Lawler was suspended as a result of a domestic abuse incident at his home in Memphis, Tennessee. The last SmackDown airing on Thursday nights had 2.0 million viewers with a 0.6 share and was emanated from Van Andel Arena in Grand Rapids, Michigan.

=== Move to Tuesday nights and second brand extension (2016–2019) ===
The SmackDown Live logo used from 2016 to 2019.

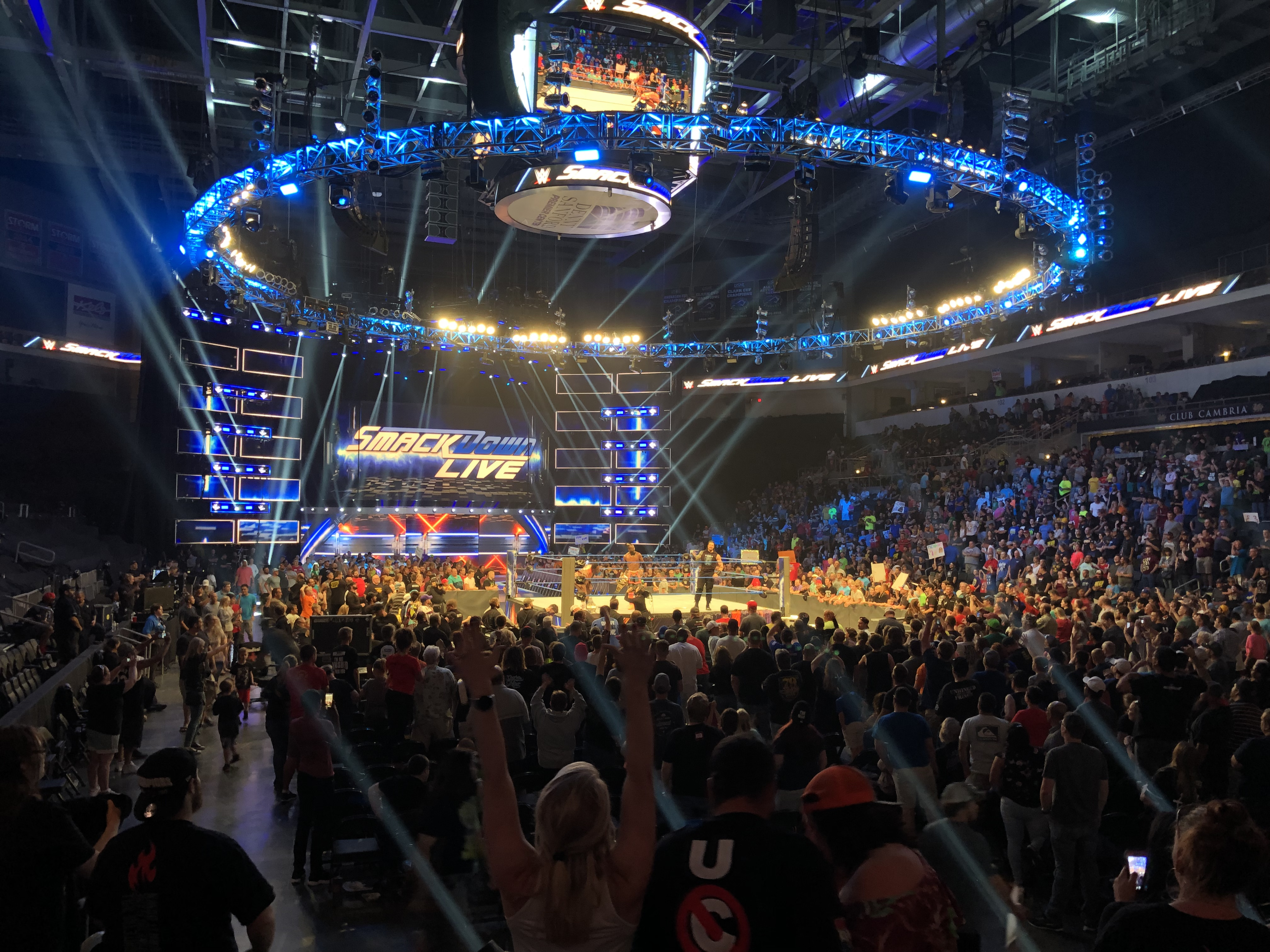
The second set of SmackDown Live used after the current brand extension. The design shown in picture was used after SummerSlam.

On May 25, 2016, it was revealed that SmackDown would move to Tuesday nights and air live instead of the previous pre-recorded format, and that the brand split would also return. Vince McMahon named Shane McMahon the commissioner of SmackDown, and Daniel Bryan was revealed as the new SmackDown General Manager. On July 22, 2016, general manager Daniel Bryan revealed the new SmackDown logo on his official Twitter page.

Immediately following the 2016 WWE draft, John "Bradshaw" Layfield returned as a color commentator, while David Otunga also returned as a color commentator afterwards. The show also debuted a new stage, new graphics, new theme songs, along with new ring post designs, and blue ropes. The final Monday Night Raw and SmackDown Live of 2016 took place at the Allstate Arena in Chicago, Monday for Raw and Tuesday for SmackDown, that week's episode of SmackDown had a higher rating as well as selling more tickets than Raw, which took place the previous night. This was the first time in the history of SmackDown's existence this happened. During the November 7, 2017, episode of SmackDown, AJ Styles beat Jinder Mahal for the WWE Championship, the first time the WWE Championship changed hands outside of North America.

On April 10, 2018, SmackDown Commissioner Shane McMahon announced that Daniel Bryan was back as a full-time WWE Superstar after his in-ring return at WrestleMania 34, therefore "graciously accepted Daniel's resignation as SmackDown General Manager". He then named Paige the new general manager.

From June 24, 2019, WWE implemented an order from Vince McMahon that there would be no wrestling during commercial breaks to Raw and SmackDown. An exception was during split screen viewing of both the match and commercials. This led to matches having breaks and restarts, and best of three falls matches with relatively quick falls.

== Fox and return to Friday nights (2019–2024) ==
On May 16, 2018, The Hollywood Reporter, citing sources familiar with the situation, reported that NBCUniversal was planning to renew its rights to Raw, but that WWE was offering SmackDown separately to other broadcasters. On May 21, it was reported that WWE was nearing a five-year deal with Fox (the parent network of former SmackDown broadcaster MyNetworkTV) beginning in October 2019, valued at $205 million per-year, tripling the amount paid by NBCUniversal and USA Network.

On June 27, 2018, WWE officially announced that SmackDown would move to Fox beginning October 4, 2019, also returning the show to Friday nights.

WWE SmackDown logo used from years 2019 to 2024.

With their transition to Fox in October 2019, changes were made to the logo. Additionally, the show dropped "Live" from the title and returned to referring to it as Friday Night SmackDown.

== Return to USA Network and remaining on Friday nights (2024–present) ==
On May 9, 2024 it was announced that WWE SmackDown will return to the USA Network starting on September 13, 2024. It had been discussed ever since early 2024 before the month of May.
