= The American Tragedy =

American rock and roll band

- Origin: Shreveport, Louisiana, United States
- Genres: Rock; Alternative
- Years active: 2000-2012
- Members: Adam Dale; Jackie Brock; Ryan Dougherty; Trey Danger
- Past members: Jason Sepulvado; Eric Denny; J.C. Eiland

The American Tragedy is a rock and roll band from Shreveport, Louisiana, United States.

== Touring ==
The American Tragedy has shared the stage with Staind, Thursday, Godsmack, Saliva, Flaw, L.A. Guns, and Bowling For Soup.

They have also done 4 tours from coast to coast in the United States performing at notable venues such as: House of Blues New Orleans, Whisky a Go Go in Los Angeles, The Mason Jar Phoenix, The Milk Bar in San Francisco, The Big Fish Pub in Tempe, CBGB in Manhattan, Classic Rock Cafe in Oklahoma City, Fitzgerald's in Houston, Howlin' Wolf in New Orleans, Tipitina's in New Orleans, Hard Rock Cafe in Orlando and also have sold over 8,000 CDs from touring alone.

== Members ==
Current

- Adam Dale - Vocals, Guitars (2000–2015)
- Jackie Brock - Guitars (2001–2015)
- Ryan Dougherty - Bass (2010–2015)
- Trey Danger - Drums (2000–2015)

Former

- J.C. Eiland - Bass (2000–2003)
- Jason Sepulvado - Bass (2003–2010)

Guests and additional members

- Eric Denny - Guitar on Pennies

== Discography ==
=== Studio albums ===
| Year | Album |
|---|---|
| 2001 | Pennies |
| 2002 | The Soundtrack |
| 2004 | No Formula |
| 2005 | Welcome to the Show |
| 2012 | The Flame - EP |

=== Singles ===
- 2006: The Rosenburg
- 2012: Everyone Will Finish
