= Boyz/Girlz Channel =

Defunct short-lived American pay television kids networks

Boyz Channel Girlz Channel
- Country: United States

Programming
- Language: English
- Picture format: 480i (SDTV)

Ownership
- Owner: Fox Family Worldwide (News Corporation, Saban Entertainment)
- Sister channels: Fox Family Channel

History
- Launched: October 31, 1999; 26 years ago
- Closed: August 18, 2000; 26 years ago

Links
- Website: bChannel.com (BoyzChannel, archived) gChannel.com (GirlzChannel) (Note: gChannel.com is blacklisted from the Wayback Machine.)

Boyz Channel and Girlz Channel (formatted as girlzChannel and boyzChannel) were two short-lived American pay cable television channels owned by Fox Family Worldwide, a then joint-venture between News Corporation and Saban Entertainment. Both networks launched on October 31, 1999, and operated as offshoots to the analog Fox Family Channel and the Fox Kids block on Fox, each aired programming that geared towards a specific gender. A lack of subscribers and interest led to the closure of both networks within ten months of their launch.

== History ==
On October 27, 1998, Fox Family Worldwide announced the launch of two pay digital networks called "The Boyz Channel" and "The Girlz Channel". Promoted as being the first ever networks to focus strictly on boys or girls, they would be aimed towards a 2–14 child audience, while programming after 9:00 pm and in non-prime weekend time periods would focus on parents. The programming would be sourced from the existing libraries of Fox Kids and FFW, along with some outside acquisitions, with original programming likely planned over time. Both channels were scheduled to launch in 1999 with projections of a reach of three million households by the end of 2000. FFW would also launch separate websites in the lead-up to the launch of the networks. Before the launch, the network's names were formatted as "girlzChannel" and "boyzChannel" and the channels would be advertising-free, with the network's websites taking COPPA-compliant advertising.

Both networks launched on October 31, 1999, and were only available on some smaller cable operators. Fox Family Worldwide struggled to gain wider distribution for the networks throughout 1999, then into mid-2000.

On August 14, 2000, Fox Family Worldwide announced that both boyzChannel and girlzChannel would shut down on August 18. The company cited an overcrowded cable marketplace, high costs, low distribution before the widespread rollout of digital cable services, and a focus on the main Fox Family Channel as the reasons for the closure of both networks. Both channels had only managed to receive over 100,000 subscribers per network, well below the original carriage projections of three million homes.

== Programming ==
The programming for both networks mainly came from multiple libraries then controlled by Fox Family Worldwide, including Saban Entertainment, Fox Kids, and International Family Entertainment, often including shows which had yet to be seen in the United States. The networks featured a block scheduling format, with a four-hour preschool block in late mornings and early afternoons and programs for parents in a two-hour block after 10:00 p.m. Eastern into the overnights; regular children's programming aired in a four-hour block in the mornings after 6:00 am ET, and aired thrice daily.

=== Both networks ===
- All About Kids and Parents
- Parentz 101
- What Every Baby Knows

=== boyzChannel ===
- The All New Captain Kangaroo
- Boyzopolis
- Bringing Up Boys
- Eerie, Indiana
- Jim Button
- Mad Scientist Toon Club
- Mystic Knights of Tir Na Nog
- Ned's Newt
- Saban's Adventures of Oliver Twist
- Saban's The Why Why Family
- Space Goofs
- Spider-Man
- Tabaluga
- The Three Friends and Jerry
- The Tick
- Walter Melon
- X-Men

=== girlzChannel ===
- The Adventures of Shirley Holmes
- Bad Dog
- Breaker High
- Enigma
- Girlzopolis
- Guiding Girls
- Honeybee Hutch
- Little Mouse on the Prairie
- Magic Adventures of Mumfie
- Mister Moose's Fun Time
- St. Bear's Dolls Hospital
- Shining Time Station
- Saban's Princess Sissi
- Spellbinder: Land of the Dragon Lord
- Sweet Valley High
- Where on Earth Is Carmen Sandiego?
