= Random Acts of Comedy =

- Genre: Comedy; Game show
- Presented by: David Alan Grier
- Country of origin: United States
- Original language: English

Production
- Running time: 30 minutes
- Production company: New Star Media Inc.

Original release
- Network: Fox Family Channel
- Release: October 8, 1999 – January 1, 2000

Random Acts of Comedy is an American comedy game show hosted by David Alan Grier. The show was co-created and executive produced by John Cervenka. It premiered October 8, 1999, on the Fox Family Channel. Two contestants had to identify "The Who", "The What", and "The Where" in a scene performed by improv actors. For example, the actors could be asked to act out Santa Claus (The Who) serving hot dogs (The What) at a Boy Scout meeting (The Where). None of the actors were informed of "The Who", "The What", or "The Where" of each round prior to the show. As each scene was being performed, the contestants could buzz in and identify any of the three elements of the scene for points. Five rounds were played, with the last round being a musical round. Correct answers were worth ten points in round one, twenty points in rounds two and three, thirty points in round four, and fifty points in round five. If at any time, the actors accidentally revealed a clue, it was thrown out and both players get the points. At the end of the game, the contestant with the higher score won a prize package.

== Production ==
The series was produced in Hollywood at the historic KCET Studios. Co-creator and Executive Producer, John Cervenka, is one of the famous alums of the well known comedy troupe The Groundlings and went on to be a performer, writer and producer of the hit comedy series Most Extreme Elimination Challenge which aired on Spike TV.
