= Tormented (Staind album) =

Studio album by Staind
- Released: November 29, 1996
- Recorded: 1996
- Studio: The Rock Shop (Westfield)
- Genres: Nu metal; alternative metal
- Length: 73:27
- Label: Self-released
- Producers: Michael Mushok; Jeff Gilmer; Johnny April

Staind chronology
Tormented (1996)	Dysfunction (1999)

Tormented is the debut studio album by the American rock band Staind, self-released in 1996. In 1993, Staind vocalist Aaron Lewis and Staind guitarist Mike Mushok met each other at a Christmas party in the New England area. Mushok brought drummer Jon Wysocki into the fold and Lewis had a connection with bass guitarist Pete McEwan who later left, starting the early lineup. Shortly after bassist Johnny April joined, Staind officially formed in Springfield, Massachusetts on November 24, 1995. Touring in the Northeast United States helped Staind achieve a cult following.

Tormented was self-released on November 29, 1996. Promoting Tormented, Staind played gigs throughout New England with bands such as God Lives Underwater, Gwar, and Kilgore. The album helped get Staind a record deal with Limp Bizkit vocalist Fred Durst and the record label Flip Records. Durst was initially appalled by the album artwork, but changed his mind and signed Staind after being impressed with the band's performance.

Tormented received minor attention after its release, selling at least a few thousand copies. Critical reception was positive towards the heaviness and aggression of Tormented, but was negative towards the album's production. Described as a grunge-influenced metal album by critics, Tormented is somewhat of a concept album that tells the story of a depressed person who eventually commits suicide, inspired by Lewis's past struggles with depression, a relationship break-up and suicidal thoughts.

== Background and recording ==
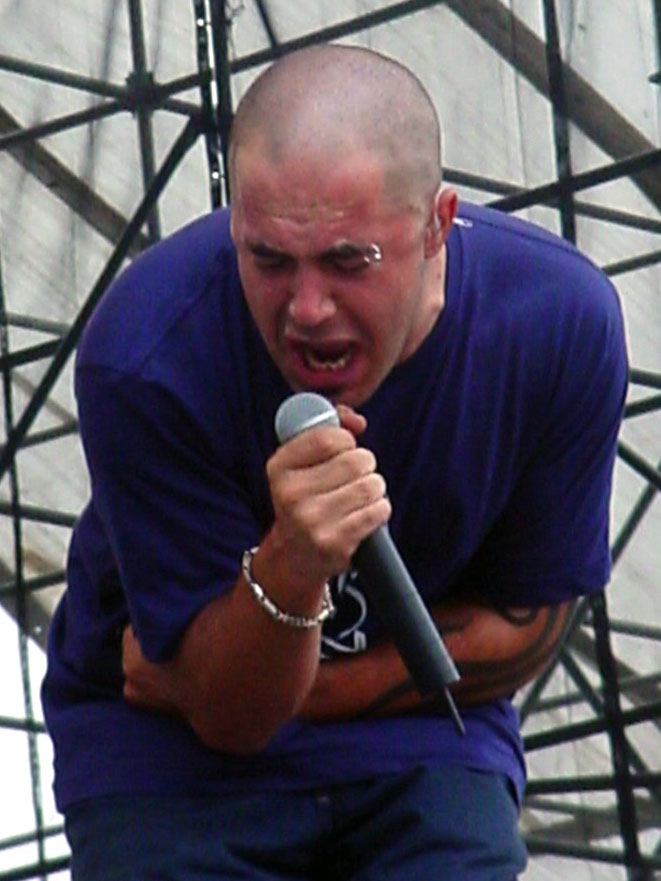
Lewis (pictured) said that he did not "have it very good as a kid".

In 1993, Lewis and Staind guitarist Mike Mushok met at a Christmas party in Springfield, Massachusetts. Mushok brought drummer Jon Wysocki into the band and Lewis had a connection with bass guitar player Pete McEwan who later left, completing the early lineup of the band in early 1995. Originally, Staind went by the name Stain, but changed the name to Staind after the band found out the moniker already had been claimed by another group. Staind originally covered songs by bands such as Korn, Tool, Alice in Chains, Rage Against the Machine, Stone Temple Pilots, Pearl Jam, Deftones, and Helmet. The band played their first gig in February 1995. The band officially formed in Springfield, Massachusetts on November 24, 1995, after Johnny April joined the same month replacing the original bassist. By 1996, Staind obtained the $2,500 they needed for recording Tormented. While Tormented was being written and recorded, Lewis reportedly was going through the throes of the breakup of a four-year relationship. Mushok said in a 2021 Ultimate Guitar interview that the first songs he and Lewis wrote together are "No One's Kind" and "Painful", both of which appeared on Tormented. Extensive touring in the Northeast United States helped Staind acquire an underground following. In a 2008 interview, Lewis elaborated on the motivation for the musical style featured on Tormented:

The closest we ever came to being a heavy metal band was on our very first record, Tormented. On that, we were trying to fit into the Boston hardcore scene. That was what we had to work with at the time. We didn't have a record deal. We didn't have anything going on. In order to try to compete in some way in the Boston hardcore music scene, we wrote a really heavy record, and our roots for that heaviness were metal. It's never been that since. Even Dysfunction was a huge step away from Tormented.

== Music and lyrics ==
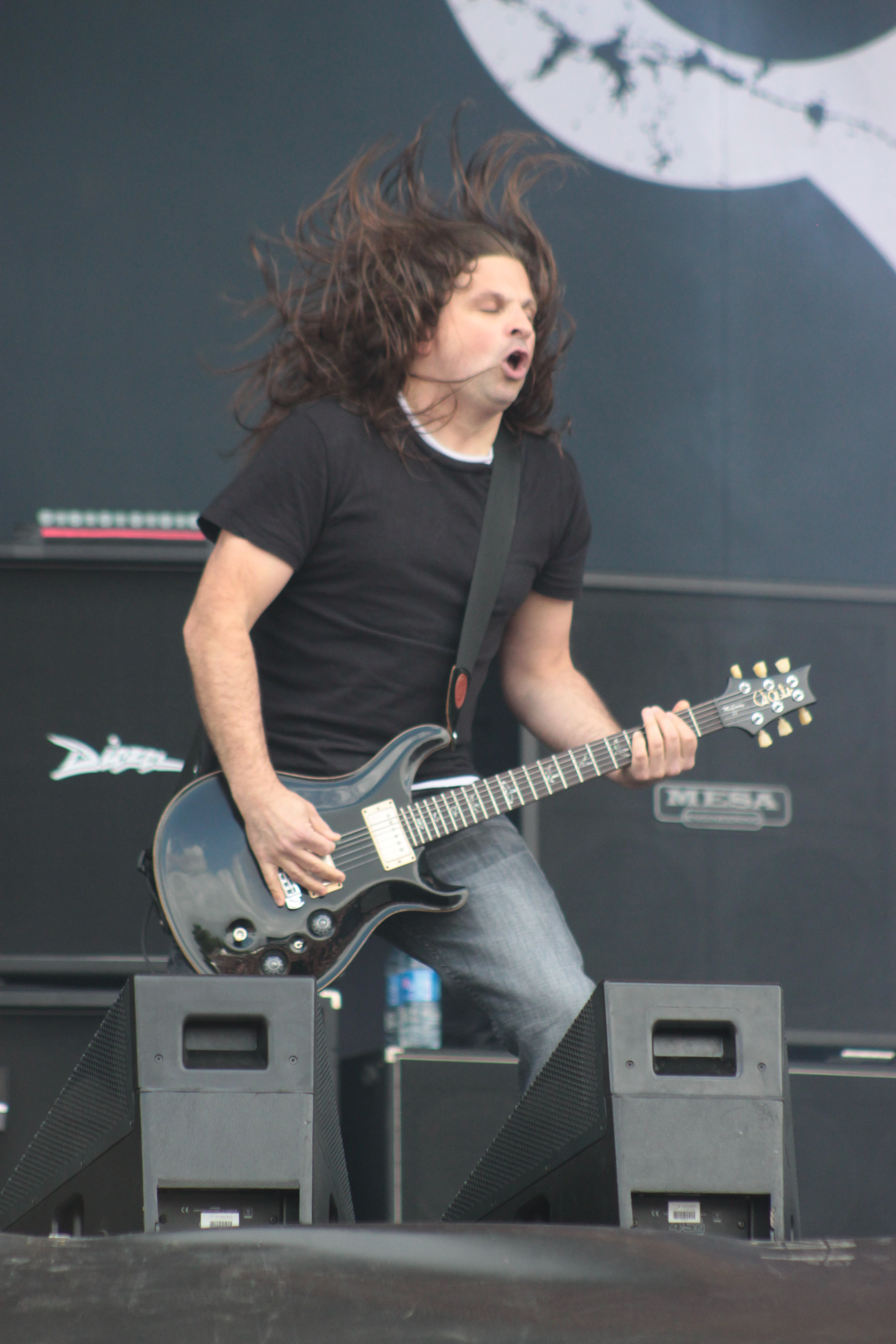
Mushok (pictured) cited Pantera, Black Sabbath, Iron Maiden, and Rage Against the Machine as influences, inspiring the heavy guitar riffs on Tormented.

The songs on Tormented are about topics such as pain, animosity, suicide and depression. Author Tommy Udo wrote: "Tormented is one long rush of hardcore brat-rage, a 900mph scream of a man smashing his head against a wall with frustration". According to Rockzone, Tormented "revealed the raw feelings of a band whose front man Aaron Lewis captivated the minds and souls of teenagers and young adults tired of the vanity that has overcome life." Described as alternative metal by AllMusic, Tormented is also somewhat of a concept album that tells the story of a depressed person who eventually commits suicide. This is hinted by the spoken-word line, "it's been like this forever... no more... I hate my fucking life", followed by the sound of a gun being cocked before the first song, "Tolerate"; this thematic device returns with the line "there's nothing left for me" and then the sound of a gunshot immediately after the song "Four Walls" and before the hidden track "Funeral". The lyrics on Tormented were written by Lewis except the lyrics to "Four Walls", which was written by Mushok. Mushok provided the spoken word vocals on Tormented, which appeared in the songs "Tolerate", "Painful", "Nameless", "See Thru", and "Four Walls". Mushok said that Staind wrote Tormented first and then included suicidal spoken word lines such as on "Tolerate" after finishing writing the album.

The lyrics on Tormented are influenced by Lewis' life, which involved a dysfunctional family, divorced parents, a falling-out with his mother, being disowned by his grandfather's side of the family, and bullying. Lewis elaborated, saying: "My life, up to a point, was shit. But I've come a long way. I grew up in a trailer park in Vermont. That was the shit I got out of me in Tormented and Dysfunction, and tailing into Break the Cycle. But the title, Break the Cycle, says it all." For years, Lewis experienced serious depression and also considered suicide, too. "I’ve had a gun in my mouth," he says. "Just crying and wanting to do it, but not being able to for the thought of what it would do to the people I was going to leave behind. It took a hell of a lot more courage to not pull that trigger than it would have taken to pull it." The lyrics on Tormented have created controversy, with lyrics to songs like "Tolerate" and "Four Walls" showing themes of violence and antisocial values. AllMusic described Tormented as "grittier and more raw than" Staind's "subsequent releases". The album's music, which features singing and screaming, has been compared to that of the heavy metal band Pantera. During Staind's early days, Lewis was influenced by bands like Pantera and Sepultura.

According to the Lollipop, Staind combine grunge-influenced hooks with heavy metal-style drums and guitars. Describing the vocals on Tormented, Lollipop elaborated: "Vocally, it may seem odd to say a band can have the passionate trembling of, ya know, those Seattle bands, yet have a desperate howl that is rather Kornesque." According to AllMusic, Tormented shows influences from Tool, Faith No More, and Pantera. In 2008, Staind guitarist Mike Mushok expressed his lack of appreciation for Tormented: "We have a lot of fans who say, 'I love Tormented.' I'm like, 'Have you ever listened to it? Because I can't.' " Despite being an aggressive album overall, Tormented's song "Four Walls" is a soft song, foreshadowing Staind's overall change in the early 2000s to a softer sound.

== Release, promotion, and reception ==
=== Release, promotion, and sales ===
Self-released on November 29, 1996, Tormented was launched with a record-release party which drew at least 900 people, with many obtaining the album. Being distributed to local record stores and at concerts, 2,000 copies of Tormented were sold within a year and Tormented was later available on Staind's website. Tormented had only sold a few thousand copies by 2002. Promoting the release of Tormented, Staind played gigs throughout New England with bands such as God Lives Underwater, Gwar, and Kilgore.

=== Critical reception ===
Anthony Tognazzini of AllMusic gave the album a very positive review, writing: "[Tormented] shows a band with its alternative metal heart in the right place [...] Despite some spotty production, this impressive debut unleashes a band whose amps are overloaded, and whose aim is deadly. The original version of "Mudshuvel" (which later appeared on Dysfunction) is one of several highlights." In 1997, Steven Woltasek of CMJ New Music Report wrote: "For those of you that don't know, wake up and look around for the debut release from Staind entitled Tormented". In the book Brave Nu World, author Tommy Udo wrote: "To go back now and listen to Staind's 1996 debut, Tormented, back to back with Break The Cycle is like listening to another band". Scott Hefflon of the Lollipop wrote: "Staind are savvy, street-smart, and dammit, they rock. Their studio debut, tOrmenteD, shows either a natural knack for milking the most out of a crunchy guitar, or they had some good coaching." The Northeast Performer wrote: "Staind's musicianship is striking, and their live performance takes their recorded material one step further: pushing the envelope, ripping up the envelope, then jumping up and down all over the envelope til there ain't a damn thing left". Andrew Blackie of PopMatters wrote about Tormented: "It’s disarming how heavy" Staind "were in those days, how screaming misery ... over harsh, sololess distortions made them sound more like the protégé of Pantera than the descendants of Alice in Chains they do today." Chad Childers of Loudwire ranked Tormented sixth place out of the band's seven studio albums, describing it as "a promising start for Staind, though one not widely heard."

== Artwork ==
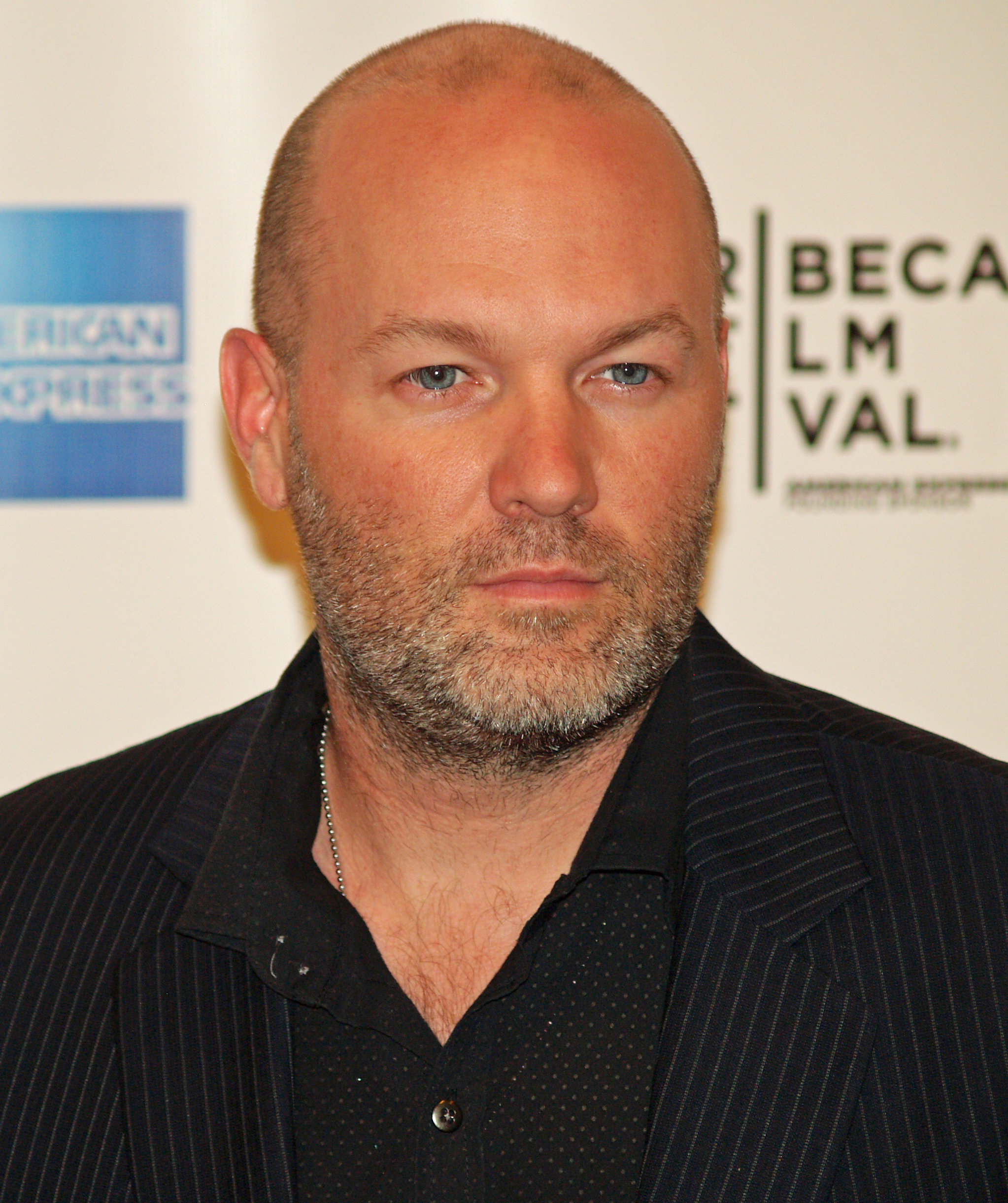
Durst directed four Staind videos.

The album is known for its grotesque, graphic cover art. The cover depicts a bloody Barbie doll on a crucifix with nails hanging from a plastic frame, a buried person with a rosary protruding from the person's nose, and a knife impaling a Bible. On October 23, 1997, when Staind met Limp Bizkit vocalist Fred Durst at the Webster Theater in Hartford, Connecticut, Tormented's album cover appalled Durst so much that he attempted to remove Staind from a concert bill shortly before their performance. Durst thought that Staind were Theistic Satanists. Despite his attempts to stop the band from performing, Durst eventually changed his mind and allowed Staind to perform. After hearing Staind perform, Durst was so impressed that he signed them to Flip Records by February 1998. Durst produced Staind's second album Dysfunction (1999).

Mushok said he "tried to get" Durst "to calm down", explaining to Durst that the cover art was meant to portray someone "who seemed normal going through a difficult time". Mushok said the cover art represents "someone who had lost belief in everything". According to Mushok, the cover art was not meant to be a religious thing. Mushok said the cover art "came out" as a religious thing "because the Bible was the most shocking image." Lewis said that the album cover "was twisted and demented and it totally did what it was supposed to do, which is shock the hell out of [Durst]". Lewis then said nonetheless, Durst "didn't find it shocking in an amusing way. It definitely grabbed your attention. That was the point of it." Lewis also has said about Tormented's album cover: "That artwork depicted where I was at in my life," Lewis says. "I had lost faith in everything, from religion to love to life." Staind reportedly thought later that the album cover for Tormented was naïve. According to Mushok, Staind had to reschedule the album's release party because they had difficulty finding anyone willing to print the artwork. Tormented also has artwork that shows the album's titles in smeared blood similar to the Charles Manson tradition. Backwards letters are also used on the song titles.

== Live performances and post-Tormented ==
The Tormented track "Mudshuvel" was re-recorded and renamed "Mudshovel" as a radio-friendly version and the re-recorded version was released in 1999 as the third single for Staind's second studio album Dysfunction. It became the band's breakthrough single and the most popular song from their second studio album, ranking on the Mainstream Rock chart for 28 weeks where it peaked at number 10 in November 1999. The Tormented track "Come Again" is on Staind's 2006 singles compilation. "Come Again" also appears on a three-song sampler which was both free and available for fans who pre-ordered Staind's 2005 studio album Chapter V. The Tormented track "See Thru" was re-recorded for the 2002 soundtrack album NASCAR on Fox: Crank It Up. For a long time, Staind have not played many songs from Tormented except for "Tolerate", "Come Again", and "Break".

== Track listing ==
All lyrics are written by Aaron Lewis, except where noted; all music is composed by Michael Mushok, except where noted.

No.	Title	Lyrics	Music	Length
1.	"Tolerate"			4:38
2.	"Come Again"			3:47
3.	"Break"		Staind	3:58
4.	"Painful"			3:29
5.	"Nameless"		Mushok; Lewis	3:30
6.	"Mudshuvel"			4:34
7.	"See Thru"			4:27
8.	"Question?"			3:30
9.	"No One's Kind"			4:46
10.	"Self Destruct"			3:38
11.	"Four Walls": "Four Walls"; Silence; "Funeral""	Mushok	Mushok; Johnny April	33:10: 5:28; 8:02; 19:40
Total length:				73:27

Notes

- The voice from the intro of "Tolerate" can be heard again at the end of "Four Walls", saying, "There's nothing left for me", followed by the sound of a gunshot, segueing into the silence that follows.
- "Four Walls" ends at 5:28, and is followed by 8:02 seconds of silence. A hidden track begins at 13:30.
- The hidden track at the end of “Four Walls”, entitled "Funeral", is a near 20-minute musique concrète track, meant to replicate a funeral. The track contains a church organ that plays continuously throughout the track, the sound of a few people coughing, and a preacher reciting passages of the Bible, including Psalm 23 and Psalm 121 from the Old Testament's book the Book of Psalms. The audio progressively distorts, with the preacher’s voice descending in pitch and back-masking, the organ becoming more sporadic in its composition, and the sounds of static and a siren spontaneously interrupting.

== Personnel ==
Credits are adapted from AllMusic and Tormented's liner notes.

Staind

- Aaron Lewis – lead vocals
- Mike Mushok – guitars, backing vocals, spoken word
- Johnny April – bass, backing vocals
- Jon Wysocki – drums

Additional personnel

- Jeff Gilmer – production, engineering
- Mike Mushok – production, artwork
- Johnny April – production, artwork
- Kaz – artwork
- Keith Vasquez – photography
