= Frayed at Both Ends =

Studio album by Aaron Lewis
- Released: January 28, 2022
- Genres: Alternative country; country rock
- Length: 51:28 (standard); 55:55 (deluxe)
- Label: Valory Music Co.
- Producers: Aaron Lewis; Ira Dean; Ben Kitterman; Jake Burns; John Carter Cash

Aaron Lewis chronology
State I'm In (2019)	Frayed at Both Ends (2022)	The Hill (2024)

Singles from Frayed at Both Ends
- 1. "Am I the Only One" Released: July 2, 2021

Frayed at Both Ends is the fourth studio album by American country musician and Staind member Aaron Lewis, Released on January 28, 2022. It peaked at number five on the Billboard Top Country Albums chart, and was the top selling country album in America on release.

== Content ==
Lewis has described the album as "stripped down and as raw and as naked as it could possibly be" with the goal being to remove distractions from the songs, and as being "an album of saying things that need to be said about how people actually live". The song "Everybody Talks to God" was written around 20 years ago by Chris Wallen but had never been recorded. "They Call Me Doc", which tells the story of a triage soldier, was co-written by a navy veteran as part of the CreatiVets program. The album includes number one country hit "Am I the Only One".

The deluxe version of the album includes the song "The Third Degree", the lyrics of which were taken from a poem from a notebook belonging to Johnny Cash. Cash's son John Carter Cash gave Lewis permission to create the song. It was also included on the expanded edition of Forever Words.

== Tour ==
On January 26, 2022, two days before the release of the album, Lewis performed at the Warrior Zone in Fort Campbell. This performance was the first stop in a tour promoting Frayed at Both Ends. In mid January, Lewis underwent an emergency appendectomy, leading to some shows being canceled.

== Reception ==
Alex Clifton, writing for In Review Online, called the album "a mostly turgid, mediocre affair" even when it was not "peddling Lewis's particular propaganda".

== Track listing ==
Frayed at Both Ends track listing
No.	Title	Writer(s)	Length
1.	"Again"	Aaron Lewis; Ira Dean; David Lee Murphy	4:03
2.	"Goodbye Town"	Lewis; Randy Montana	3:24
3.	"Everybody Talks to God"	Craig Monday; Chris Wallin	4:17
4.	"Am I the Only One"	Lewis; Dean; Jeffrey Steele	4:29
5.	"Kill Me Like You Love Me"	Lewis; Dean; Dan Tyminski; Wallin	4:48
6.	"Pull Me Under"	Lewis; Ben Kitterman; Paul Barber	4:28
7.	"Life Behind Bars"	Lewis; Josh Hoge; Matt McGinn	3:29
8.	"Waiting There for Me"	Lewis; Dean; Tyminski; Wallin	3:07
9.	"They Call Me Doc"	Shaun Bott; Brian Carper; Richard Casper; Johnny McGuire; Jordan Walker	4:03
10.	"Get What You Get"	Lewis; Dean; Tyminski	3:43
11.	"Sticks and Stones"	Lewis; McGinn; Barber	3:10
12.	"One in the Same"	Lewis; Trent Tomlinson	4:28
13.	"Someone"	Lewis; Barber; McGinn	3:59
Total length:			51:36

Deluxe edition bonus track
No.	Title	Writer(s)	Length
14.	"The Third Degree"	Lewis; John Carter Cash; Johnny Cash; Dean; Kitterman	4:20
Total length:			55:56

== Personnel ==
Musicians

- Aaron Lewis – lead vocals (all tracks), background vocals (6, 14), foot stamping (14)
- Seth Taylor – acoustic guitar (1–8, 10–13), nylon-string guitar (2); banjo, mandolin (8); baritone guitar (11)
- Biff Watson – acoustic guitar (1, 4, 10, 12, 13)
- David Lee Murphy – background vocals (1)
- Laur Joamets – baritone guitar (1), acoustic guitar (3)
- Dan Tyminski – mandolin (1, 5, 10), acoustic guitar (5, 9, 10), background vocals (9, 10)
- Tom Bukovac – acoustic guitar (2, 3, 6, 7, 11)
- Ira Dean – background vocals (2, 14), piano (3), percussion (5), string arrangement (6); bass guitar, foot stamping (14)
- Ben Kitterman – Dobro (2, 5, 7, 10, 14), string arrangement (3, 6); background vocals, foot stamping (14)
- Mickey Raphael – harmonica (2, 12)
- Jeffrey Steele – background vocals (3)
- Matt Combs – cello, viola, violin (3, 4, 6)
- Jake Burns – percussion (3, 5)
- Bennett Salvay – string arrangement (4)
- Vince Gill – background vocals (9)
- Jim "Moose" Brown – Hammond B3 (10), piano (12)
- Chris Scruggs – acoustic guitar, background vocals, foot stamping (14)
- Derrek Phillips – drums, background vocals, foot stamping (14)
- Bob Britt – electric guitar, background vocals, foot stamping (14)
- Tony Harrell – Hammond B3, background vocals, foot stamping (14)
- Chuck Turner – background vocals, foot stamping (14)
- John Carter Cash – background vocals, foot stamping (14)
- Trey Call – background vocals, foot stamping (14)

Technical

- Aaron Lewis – production (1–8, 10–13)
- Ira Dean – production (1–8, 10–14)
- Ben Kitterman – production (1–3, 5–13), production coordination
- Jake Burns – production (9), recording (1–13)
- John Carter Cash – production (14)
- Ted Jensen – mastering (1–13)
- Chris Lord-Alge – mixing (1–13)
- Chuck Turner – mastering, mixing, recording (14)
- Adam Chagnon – engineering (1–13)
- Matt Rausch – recording (4)
- Brian Judd – mixing assistance (1–13)
- Patrick Prophet – recording assistance (1–13)
- Andrew Stevens – recording assistance (2, 3)
- Trey Call – recording assistance (14)
- Janice Soled – production coordination
- John Varvatos Jr. – production coordination
- Doug Rich – production coordination

== Charts ==
Chart performance for Frayed at Both Ends
Chart (2022)	Peak position
US Billboard 200	39
US Independent Albums (Billboard)	5
US Top Album Sales (Billboard)	5
US Top Country Albums (Billboard)	5
