= Do Right =

Do Right may refer to:

- Do Right (Paul Davis song) P. Davis 1980
- Do Right (Mario song) Akon, Harold Lilly, Giorgio Tuinfort, Mario 2007
- Do Right (Glades song), 2017
- "Do Right", a 1974 song by Jackie Brown
- "Do Right", song by Jimmie's Chicken Shack from Bring Your Own Stereo
