= Just Go (Staind song) =

Single by Staind

from the album Dysfunction
- Released: May 1999
- Recorded: December 1998
- Studio: Studio Litho (Seattle)
- Genre: Nu metal
- Length: 4:50
- Label: Flip; Elektra
- Songwriters: Aaron Lewis; Mike Mushok; Johnny April; Jon Wysocki
- Producers: Terry Date; Fred Durst; Staind

Staind singles chronology
| "Just Go" (1999) | "Mudshovel" (1999) |

Music video
- "Just Go" on YouTube

"Just Go" is a song by the American rock band Staind. It was released in May 1999 as the second single from the album Dysfunction, though it had previously been released as a double A-side with "Suffocate" in February 1999.

The song reached number 24 on the US Billboard Mainstream Rock chart.

== Music video ==
The song's music video was directed by Limp Bizkit frontman Fred Durst. The video depicts a simultaneous shot of a young woman descending through mental anguish from her friends and family while intercut with shots of the band performing. The video ends with the woman jumping off of a balcony into a swimming pool. The video ends as she lands in the water, cutting to the film crew on set as Durst grabs the actress a towel. The song is featured on the MTV compilation return of the rock.

== Track listing ==
CD single (Catalog#: PRCD 1243-2)

| # | "Just Go" | Time |
|---|---|---|
| 1. | "Just Go" (radio edit) | 03:34 |
| 2. | "Just Go" (album version) | 04:47 |
| 3. | "Audio Bio" | 00:50 |

== Charts ==
| Chart (1999) | Peak position |
|---|---|
| US Billboard Mainstream Rock Tracks | 24 |
