= Home (Staind song) =

1999 single by American rock band Staind

Single by Staind

from the album Dysfunction
- Released: November 30, 1999
- Recorded: 1998
- Studio: Studio Litho (Seattle)
- Genre: Nu metal; post-grunge
- Length: 4:06
- Label: Flip; Elektra
- Songwriters: Aaron Lewis; Mike Mushok; Johnny April; Jon Wysocki
- Producers: Terry Date; Fred Durst; Staind

Staind singles chronology
"Mudshovel" (1999)	"Home" (1999)	"It's Been Awhile" (2001)

Music video
- "Home" on YouTube

"Home" is a song by the American rock band Staind. It was released on November 30, 1999 as the third single from the album Dysfunction.

== Writing ==
Staind's lead vocalist, Aaron Lewis, penned this song to reflect on the challenges of being apart from his wife, Vanessa, during the band's tours. Contrary to the glamorous image often associated with touring, it leaves him in hotels, distanced from those he cherishes. Within the song, he reveals his deepest fear: returning only to find Vanessa no longer there.

Lewis wrote the lyric and composed the music along with his Staind bandmates, who are all credited as writers.

== Track listing ==
No.	Title	Length
1.	"Home (LP version)"	4:06
2.	"Audio Bio"	0:50

== Charts ==
Chart (1999)	Peak position
US Billboard Rock	11
US Billboard Alt	17
