= Am I the Only One =

Am I the Only One may refer to:

- "Am I the Only One" (Dierks Bentley song), a 2011 song by Dierks Bentley
- "Am I the Only One" (Aaron Lewis song), a 2021 song by Aaron Lewis
