= Dysfunction (album) =

Studio album by Staind
- Released: April 13, 1999
- Recorded: August 1998
- Studio: Studio Litho (Seattle)
- Genres: Nu metal; alternative metal
- Length: 56:08
- Labels: Flip; Elektra
- Producers: Terry Date; Staind; Jordan Schur (exec.); Fred Durst (co-producer)

Staind chronology
Tormented (1996)	Dysfunction (1999)	Break the Cycle (2001)

Singles from Dysfunction
- 1. "Just Go" Released: May 1999; 2. "Mudshovel" Released: October 26, 1999; 3. "Home" Released: November 30, 1999; 4. "Suffocate" Released: 2000

Dysfunction is the second studio album by American rock band Staind, released on April 13, 1999, by Flip Records and Elektra Records. It is the band's first studio album released on a record label.

Staind self-released their debut album Tormented in 1996. On October 23, 1997, the band met Limp Bizkit vocalist Fred Durst. Durst was initially appalled by Tormented's graphic artwork, and refused to sign Staind, but changed his mind after being impressed with the band's performance. Durst signed the band to Flip/Elektra and helped the band record Dysfunction. Staind promoted Dysfunction through touring and sampler cassettes.

Continuing, but expanding on, the dark alternative metal and nu metal sound displayed on Tormented, Dysfunction features a varied increase of singing and screaming, emotionally vulnerable lyrics inspired by singer Aaron Lewis' life, with a noticeable increase of melodic sections. Although still similar to Tormented in tone, Dysfunction is more melodic, has an absence of lo-fi production, and, despite prominent moments of screaming, features more clean singing than Tormented. Critics compared Dysfunction to various bands, including Korn, Coal Chamber, Spineshank, Nothingface, Deftones, Tool, and Alice in Chains.

Dysfunction received mostly mixed reviews upon release; some critics praising Lewis' vocals and lyrics, as well as Murshok's guitar playing, while some criticized the album for being repetitive in terms of song structure. Despite little success upon release, the album grew into mainstream popularity at the end of 1999 with the success of the singles "Just Go", "Mudshovel" and "Home", eventually peaking at number 74 on the Billboard 200 chart in November of that year. After the release of Staind's next album Break the Cycle (2001), Dysfunction experienced a resurgence in popularity and reached number 1 on Billboard's Top Pop Catalog Albums chart. In February 2004, the album was certified double platinum by the Recording Industry Association of America (RIAA), signifying the shipment of two million copies in the United States.

== Background and recording ==
Staind self-released its debut album Tormented in 1996. On October 23, 1997, Staind met Limp Bizkit vocalist Fred Durst at the Webster Theater in Hartford, Connecticut. Staind showed Durst a copy of Tormented and Durst was appalled by the album cover, which depicts a bloody Barbie doll on a crucifix with nails hanging from a plastic frame, a buried person with a rosary protruding from the person's nose, and a knife impaling a Bible. Durst assumed the band were Theistic Satanists.

Despite initially trying to remove Staind from opening for Limp Bizkit due to the album cover of Tormented, Fred Durst was impressed with Staind's performance and changed his mind. After hearing their four-song demo, Durst signed Staind to Flip/Elektra to record the band's album Dysfunction. Durst and Staind then traveled to Jacksonville, Florida, to begin developing and recording new songs, and after a meeting with Flip, Staind recorded a three-track sampler in Los Angeles, California. By February 1998, they acquired a record contract and, after performing on the summer Warped Tour, began recording Dysfunction in August 1998. Dysfunction was recorded at Studio Litho and mixed at Studio X in Seattle, Washington. Durst introduced Staind to Terry Date. Date said that after hearing the singing voice of Staind lead singer Aaron Lewis, he instantly thought Lewis's "voice was pretty undeniable." While Durst did most of Dysfunction's preproduction work, "Date said his only challenge was to capture the explosive live feel of the band and help bring out both their melodic and hard sensibilities." After working with Durst in Jacksonville, Staind moved back to their hometown Springfield, Massachusetts, to write songs like "Me", "Just Go", "Home", and some other songs from Dysfunction.

== Music and lyrics ==
"My life, up to a point was shit. But I've come a long way. I grew up in a trailer park in Vermont. That was the shit I got out of me in Tormented and Dysfunction, and tailing into Break the Cycle."

— Lewis on his early life and the inspiration for Dysfunction's lyrics.

Staind's vocalist, Aaron Lewis, has stated he feels that, "Dysfunction was a huge step away from Tormented." Guitarist Mike Mushok expressed frustration in how label personnel were in no way intrusive on the production of Dysfunction, but after it sold over a million copies, the band would be relentlessly hassled during the production of future albums. Considered nu metal and alternative metal, Dysfunction is known for featuring both singing and screaming. The album is also known for featuring songs with slow parts that then turn into aggressive parts with screaming. The album's lyrics are noted for being either angry or depressing. Gil Kaufman of MTV wrote that the album "doesn't share the heavy hip-hop influence of the band's new pals. Staind's aggressive sound mixes the industrial crunch of Tool with the morose, heavy rock of Seattle grunge-rockers Alice in Chains." CMJ New Music Report compared Dysfunction to Deftones' Adrenaline, Spineshank, Nothingface's Pacifier, Coal Chamber, and "Korn's non-hip-hop moments". Lewis said of Dysfunction's lyrics: "All the lyrics are about me," Lewis said. "That's why it's called Dysfunction. It's just a list of all the fucked-up shit I've gone through in life." Although Dysfunction features some screaming in some songs, the album features less screaming than Tormented, and is a lot more melodic than Tormented. Durst encouraged Lewis to use more melody in his voice after being impressed by Lewis' singing voice. After describing Tormented as "one long rush of hardcore brat-rage, a 900mph scream of a man smashing his head against a wall in frustration", Tommy Udo wrote in his book Brave Nu World: "1999's Dysfunction is the sound of a band trying to get to grips with all the anger and shape something else that will reach beyond the hard core of devotees; not 'selling out' or 'going commercial', just making it bearable."

== Promotion and touring ==
Staind released three singles for the album: "Just Go/Suffocate", "Mudshovel", and "Home". Elektra Records promoted Staind in 1998. Dane Venable of Elektra said: "Before we started with radio, we tried to develop a fan presence through a street-awareness campaign." In 1998, Elektra began "with 20,000 Staind sampler cassettes, stickers, and a letter from Fred Durst endorsing the band, and that letter went out to the entire Limp Bizkit fan club list." To promote Dysfunction, Staind joined the Family Values Tour in 1999 and also opened for Limp Bizkit. The songs "Just Go", "Mudshovel", and "Home" received airplay on MTV and The Box. HBO's Reverb filmed Staind in 1999 for an episode that was scheduled to air in November 1999. Staind joined Korn for Korn's Sick and Twisted Tour in 2000 and Staind also joined MTV's Return of the Rock tour. Staind began to receive significantly more attention with the mainstream success of the song "Outside" in early 2001. An acoustic version of the song featuring Durst peaked at number 56 on the Billboard Hot 100 on March 10, 2001, remaining on the chart for 19 weeks. In March, this version also peaked at number 1 on the Mainstream Rock Tracks chart and stayed on the chart for 26 weeks and peaked at number 2 on the Alternative Songs chart and remained on the chart for 25 weeks.

== Reception ==
Professional ratings
Review scores
Source	Rating
AllMusic	2.5/5 stars
Christgau's Consumer Guide	(dud)
The Encyclopedia of Popular Music	3/5 stars
Melody Maker	2/5 stars
NME	2/10
The Rolling Stone Album Guide	2.5/5 stars

=== Critical reception ===
Dysfunction received mostly mixed reviews. CMJ New Music Report gave the album a positive review and wrote: "Generally, Lewis's plaintive, melodic and often beautiful crooning is pierced by spine-weakening guitar licks, making Staind a stand-out in the 'new metal' domain." AllMusic critic Stephen Thomas Erlewine wrote: "Other listeners, however, will likely find Dysfunction a little tedious, since there isn't a wide variety of songs on the record, nor is there anything catchy. That, of course, is a signature trait of alt-metal and helps make the record a sign of the times -- but that doesn't mean it's an easy record to enjoy for anyone outside of the cognoscenti." NME panned the album and wrote "It wouldn't be so bad if his voice didn't bring to mind Eddie Vedder being fisted in jail." Attrition.org gave the album a positive review, writing: "Dysfunction is definitely an album I would suggest to anyone who really gets into music. I suggest sitting down and listening to Aaron's amazing vocals along with the guitars of Dysfunction from beginning to the end." Orlando Weekly described the album as "an impressive start" and acclaimed the album but criticized the song "Crawl" for the song's "annoying guitar riff", calling "Crawl" "the only short stick on the disc."

=== Commercial performance ===
Dysfunction achieved a limited amount of success at first, selling only 29,000 copies and debuting at number 173 on the Billboard 200. The album then peaked at number 74 on the chart on November 6, 1999, and was on the chart for 56 weeks. In July 1999, Elektra Records reported that Dysfunction had sold 75,000 copies. Due to the album's rise in mainstream success, the album entered number 10 on and peaked at number 1 on the Heatseekers Albums chart on May 1, 1999, and October 9, 1999, respectively. Dysfunction stayed on the chart for 24 weeks. Although Dysfunction failed to achieve immediate success, the album began to achieve success months after its release. The album was certified gold by the Recording Industry Association of America (RIAA) on November 5, 1999 with sales of over 500,000 copies reported in January 2000. Dysfunction was certified platinum by the RIAA on June 14, 2000 with sales of 1,126,000 copies reported in June 2001. Due to the mainstream success of Staind's third album Break the Cycle in 2001, Dysfunction peaked at number 1 on the Catalog Albums chart on May 5, 2001, being on the chart for 24 weeks. Dysfunction was certified double platinum by the RIAA on February 26, 2004. The singles for Dysfunction received a lot of radio play on rock radio. "Mudshovel" peaked at number 10 on the Mainstream Rock Tracks chart and stayed there for 28 weeks whereas "Home" peaked at number 11 on the same chart and remained there for 26 weeks. Dysfunction was ranked number 174 on Billboard's 2000 year-end chart for Billboard 200 albums.

== Track listing ==
All lyrics are written by Aaron Lewis; all music is composed by Staind.

No.	Title	Length
1.	"Suffocate"	3:16
2.	"Just Go"	4:50
3.	"Me"	4:36
4.	"Raw"	4:09
5.	"Mudshovel"	4:42
6.	"Home"	4:06
7.	"A Flat"	4:59
8.	"Crawl"	4:29
9.	"Spleen" ("Spleen" ends at 4:38. Following 11:45 of silence is a hidden track titled "Excess Baggage".)	21:01
Total length:		56:08

- On digital editions of the album, the hidden track “Excess Baggage” is separated from “Spleen” as its own track.

Promotional version
No.	Title	Length
8.	"Bring the Noise" (Public Enemy cover; featuring Fred Durst and DJ Lethal)	3:51
9.	"Crawl"	4:29
10.	"Spleen" ("Spleen" ends at 4:38. Following 11:45 of silence is a hidden track titled "Excess Baggage".)	21:01
Total length:		59:59

- For unknown reasons, "Bring the Noise" ended up not being included on regular releases of the album, although it can be found as a bonus track on the Japanese release.

Japanese bonus track
No.	Title	Length
9.	"Spleen"	4:40
10.	"Bring the Noise" (Public Enemy cover; featuring Fred Durst and DJ Lethal) ("Bring the Noise" ends at 3:49. Following 11:40 of silence is a hidden track titled "Excess Baggage".)	20:09
Total length:		59:59

- On Japanese versions of the album, the hidden track "Excess Baggage" is moved after "Bring the Noise".

== Personnel ==
Adapted from the album's liner notes.

=== Staind ===
- Aaron Lewis – lead vocals, acoustic guitar on "Excess Baggage"
- Mike Mushok – guitars, backing vocals
- Johnny "Old School" April – bass, backing vocals
- Jon Wysocki – drums, backing vocals

=== Production ===
- Jordan Schur – executive production
- Staind – production
- Fred Durst – co-production
- Terry Date – production, engineering, mixing
- Ulrich Wild – engineering
- Tom Smurdon – assistant engineering
- John Burton – assistant mixing
- Roger Lian – mastering
- Howie Weinberg – mastering

=== Artwork ===
- Mike Mushok – concept
- Gregory Burke – art director, art design, concept
- EXUM – photography
- Jane Choi, Joe Macchio – special effects make-up

== Charts ==
=== Weekly charts ===
Weekly chart performance for Dysfunction
Chart (1999–2001)	Peak position
US Billboard 200	74
US Heatseekers Albums	1
US Top Pop Catalog Albums	1

=== Year-end charts ===
2000 year-end chart performance for Dysfunction
Chart (2000)	Position
US Billboard 200	174

== Certifications ==
Region	Certification	Certified units/sales
United States (RIAA)	2× Platinum	2,000,000^{^}
^{^} Shipments figures based on certification alone.

== Other appearances ==
- A demo of the song "Spleen", recorded in October 1997, had earlier appeared on the compilation Up The Dosage by Wonderdrug Records.
- An original version of "Mudshovel" appears on Staind's debut album Tormented as "Mudshuvel". This version features a heavier sound with less melody and also features screaming, whereas the Dysfunction version has an absence of screaming.
