= Spleen (disambiguation) =

The spleen is an organ in the human body.

Spleen may also refer to:

- Spleen, poem by Baudelaire
- Spleen (Chinese medicine), an element of body function
- A French rapper/musician who sometimes performs with CocoRosie
- A character in Mystery Men
- "Spleen", a song by Staind from Dysfunction

== See also ==
- Splean, a Russian rock band
