= Giving Something Back =

Live album by Jimmie's Chicken Shack
- Released: 1995
- Recorded: 1995
- Genre: Alternative rock
- Length: 61:12
- Label: Fowl

Jimmie's Chicken Shack chronology
| 2 for 1 Special (1995) | Giving Something Back (1995) | Pushing the Salmanilla Envelope (1997) |

Giving Something Back is a live album recorded by Jimmie's Chicken Shack during the summer of 1995. The recordings are from two shows, one at Graffiti's (21 August 1995) and one at Hammerjacks (17 July 1995). The material on the album comes from 2 for 1 Special and early versions of songs from Pushing the Salmanilla Envelope.

== Track listing ==
All tracks by Jimmie's Chicken Shack

1. Sitting with the Dog - 4:05
2. Hole - 2:01
3. Outhouse - 3:11
4. Inside - 4:43
5. Milk - 4:42
6. Vacuum - 3:16
7. Return to Sender - 3:12
8. Another Day - 3:02
9. High - 3:54
10. Blood - 3:31
11. Virginia County Line - 3:03
12. When You Die Your Dead - 2:40
13. Noseface - 3:17
14. Bliss - 4:16
15. React/Get Off/Again - 12:19

== Personnel ==
- Jimi Haha - Guitar, Vocals
- Che' Lemon - Bass
- Jim McD - Guitar, Backing Vocals
- Jim Chaney - Drums
