= The Hill (Aaron Lewis album) =

Studio album by Aaron Lewis
- Released: March 29, 2024
- Genre: Country
- Length: 38:15
- Label: Big Machine
- Producers: Aaron Lewis; Ben Kitterman; Ira Dean

Aaron Lewis chronology
Frayed at Both Ends (2022)	The Hill (2024)	Give My Country Back (2026)

The Hill is the fifth studio album by the American country musician Aaron Lewis. It was released on March 29, 2024, through The Valory Music Company.

== Critical reception ==
Antimusic states "Featuring 10 tracks penned solo or with a close circle of collaborators/confidants, the set speaks to a time of upheaval in the wider world" going on to say that "it's raw in the purest sense of the Country-rock term - often backing his jagged-edge vocal with just a guitar, dobro and mandolin".

Lorie Hollabaugh of MusicRow describes the work as "A deeply personal set written from a lifetime of highs and lows" going on to profess that "it pairs Lewis’ iconic vocal rasp with a bare-bones acoustic sound, and features 10 tracks penned solo or with a tight circle of collaborators".

== Track listing ==
All tracks are written by Aaron Lewis, Jeffrey Steele, and Ira Dean, except where noted.

No.	Title	Writer(s)	Length
1.	"Let’s Go Fishing"	Lewis; Bobby Pinson	3:19
2.	"Over the Hill"	Lewis; Pinson; Matt McGinn	3:49
3.	"Made in China"	Lewis; Pinson	4:06
4.	"Spinnin'"		3:20
5.	"Over Me"		4:15
6.	"Outlaw"	Lewis; Pinson; McGinn	3:03
7.	"Up to Me"	Lewis; Pinson	4:14
8.	"That’s My Life"		4:10
9.	"Only in My Mind"		3:46
10.	"Little More Mine"	Lewis; Pinson; McGinn	4:13
Total length:			38:15

== Personnel ==
Credits are adapted from Tidal.

=== Musicians ===
- Aaron Lewis – vocals
- Chuck Ward – acoustic guitar (tracks 1–5, 7–10), acoustic bass guitar (6)
- Ira Dean – acoustic guitar
- Tom Bukovac – acoustic guitar
- Seth Taylor – acoustic guitar
- Kevin Post – Dobro
- Maddie Denton – cello, viola, violin (track 9)
- Matt Combs – cello, viola, violin (track 9)

=== Technical ===
- Aaron Lewis – production
- Ben Kitterman – production
- Ira Dean – production (all tracks), string arrangement (track 9)
- Gavin Lurssen – mastering
- Neal Cappellino – mixing
- Steve Marcantonio – engineering
- Matt Combs – string arrangement (track 9)

== Charts ==
Chart performance for The Hill
Chart (2024)	Peak position
US Billboard 200	175
US Independent Albums (Billboard)	29
US Top Album Sales (Billboard)	6
US Top Country Albums (Billboard)	33
