= Mudshovel =

Single by Staind

from the album Dysfunction
- Released: October 26, 1999
- Recorded: 1996 (Tormented version); 1998 (Dysfunction version)
- Studio: Studio Litho (Seattle)
- Genre: Nu metal
- Length: 4:41 (Dysfunction version); 4:32 (Tormented version)
- Label: Flip; Elektra
- Songwriters: Aaron Lewis; Mike Mushok; Johnny April; Jon Wysocki
- Producers: Terry Date; Fred Durst

Staind singles chronology
"Just Go" (1999)	"Mudshovel" (1999)	"Home" (1999)

Music video
- "Mudshovel" on YouTube

"Mudshovel" (originally "Mudshuvel") is a song by the American rock band Staind. It was released in 1996 as The Sixth track from their album Tormented and then released as the third single from their 1999 studio album Dysfunction. It reached number 14 on the US Modern Rock charts and number 10 on the Mainstream Rock charts. It originally appeared in a heavier form as "Mudshuvel" on their debut album Tormented.

== Composition ==
Musically, both versions of "Mudshovel" rely on a distinctive three-note bass line that shifts into a rumbling low accompanied by a guitar playing rapidly ascending and descending natural harmonics on the A string which pulsate with the rhythm. It opens the song and is preceded by tense vocals before escalating during the chorus. The re-recorded version is more polished than the one that appeared on Tormented, taking out the screams, double kick, and chugging guitar to fit the modern rock radio format where it succeeded.

== Music video ==
A music video was filmed for the single. It mostly consists of the band playing in an enclosed arena on an elevated glass stage above a mosh pit and frontman Aaron Lewis clutching a loose gate. Interspersed with this is a storyline involving a man being cheated on by his wife/girlfriend, only for her to be cheated on as well in the ending.

== Charts ==
Chart (1999–2000)	Peak position
US Billboard Hot Mainstream Rock Tracks	10
US Billboard Hot Modern Rock Tracks	14
