= Spit Burger Lottery =

Studio album by Jimmie's Chicken Shack
- Released: 1994
- Genre: Mutt Rock
- Length: 29:44
- Label: Fowl

Jimmie's Chicken Shack chronology
Spit Burger Lottery (1994)	Pushing the Salmanilla Envelope (1997)

Spit Burger Lottery is an album by Jimmie's Chicken Shack.

== Track listing ==
1. "Milk" – 5:03
2. "Blood" – 3:40
3. "When You Die You're Dead" – 2:42
4. "Schoolbus" – 2:42
5. "Stop" – 3:14
6. "10 Miles" – 2:52
7. "Another Day" - 3:09
8. "Get Off" – 2:54
9. "Again" – 3:32
10. "Rory's dead" - 1:20 hidden track
- Music by Jimmie's Chicken Shack
- Lyrics by Jimi Haha

== Personnel ==
- Jimmie's Chicken Shack
  - Jimi Haha – gitfiddle, clucker
  - Jim McD – gitfiddle
  - Jim Chaney – drumsticks & skins
  - Che Colavita Lemon – bassting
