= Earth to Andy =

American rock band

- Origin: Charlottesville, Virginia, U.S.
- Genres: Alternative rock
- Label: Giant Records

Earth to Andy is an American alternative rock band from Charlottesville, Virginia.

== History ==
Earth to Andy was founded in 1997 by members of two local bands, Red Henry (from Charlottesville) and Egypt (from Washington D.C. The band's first release, Simple Machine, was released independently and featured a cover version of The Beatles' "I Want You (She's So Heavy)". Following its release, the group signed with Giant Records and released Chronicle Kings late in 1999. The album was produced by Nick Launay and included an appearance by the bass player of Stone Temple Pilots, Robert De Leo. The group toured with Live, Stone Temple Pilots, and Jimmie's Chicken Shack in 2000. The album's lead single, "Still After You", was a rock radio hit, reaching #39 on the Billboard Mainstream Rock charts. Guitarist Tony Lopacinski later played with Train and has written, performed, and produced country music both in his own projects and alongside artists including Sara Evans and Josh Gracin. Andy Waldeck has collaborated in songwriting endeavors with Robert DeLeo and Chris Daughtry. Drummer, Kevin Murphy, has since become an in-demand drummer in Nashville, playing for such artists as: Jon Pardi, Tonic, Randy Houser, Jimmie's Chicken Shack, Frankie Ballard, Chuck Wicks, and many others.

On June 15, 2011, guitarist Tony Lopacinski died after an 18-month battle with cancer.

== Members ==
- Andy Waldeck – vocals, guitar
- Kevin Murphy – drums, vocals
- Chris Reardon – bass, vocals
- Tony Lopacinski – guitar, vocals

== Discography ==
- Earth To Andy (Self-Titled) (Voluptuous Records, 1997)
- Simple Machine (Voluptuous Records, 1998)
- Chronicle Kings (Giant Records, 1999)
- the bradbury ep (Voluptuous Records, 2000)
- Sticks The Landing (Voluptuous Records, 2003)
- Matter Of Time (single) (Voluptuous Records, 2021)
