= Give My Country Back =

Studio album by Aaron Lewis
- Released: July 17, 2026
- Genre: Country
- Length: 39:17
- Label: Big Machine
- Producer: Sol Philcox-Littlefield

Aaron Lewis chronology
The Hill (2024)	Give My Country Back (2026)

Give My Country Back is the sixth studio album by the American musician Aaron Lewis. The album was released on July 17, 2026, via Big Machine Records. It was produced by Sol Philcox.

== Critical reception ==
Lorie Hollabaugh of MusicRow stated that the compilation "carries on the patriotic tradition of Lewis' country heroes, channeling country grit, acoustic riffs and conviction into an anthem rooted in freedom".

Blabbermouth states that it "carries on the patriotic tradition of Lewis's country heroes — from Charlie Daniels to Hank Jr. and beyond — delivering a hard-hitting message wrapped in Lewis's unmistakable vocal grit and unapologetic honesty".

== Track listing ==
Give Me Country Back track listing
No.	Title	Writer(s)	Length
1.	"The Door"	Bobby Pinson; Matthew Rogers; Benjamin Stennis	3:28
2.	"Bad Thing to Be Good At"	Aaron Lewis; Casey Beathard; Chuck Cannon; Travis Meadows; Pinson; Jeffrey Steele; Chris Wallin	4:26
3.	"Too High for This"	Lewis; Pinson	3:20
4.	"List of Things to Quit"	Lewis; Beathard; Cannon; Meadows; Pinson; Steele; Wallin	3:23
5.	"Give My Country Back"	Lewis; Beathard; Cannon; Meadows; Pinson; Steele; Wallin	3:01
6.	"People I've Known"	Lewis; Shane Minor; Pinson; Steele	4:20
7.	"Let Go Like the Rain"	Kendell Marvel; Wallin	3:19
8.	"A Showman's Life"	Jesse Winchester	4:42
9.	"Keeping Up with the Jonesin'"	Rob Hatch; Jamey Johnson	3:25
10.	"Duct Tape and Bailing Wire"	Phillip Coleman	5:53
Total length:			39:17

== Personnel ==
Credits are adapted from Tidal.

- Aaron Lewis – vocals
- Sol Philcox-Littlefield – production, additional engineering, digital editing, background vocals (all tracks); acoustic guitar (tracks 1–5, 9, 10), electric guitar (1, 2, 7–10)
- Miles McPherson – drums, percussion
- Jim "Moose" Brown – Hammond B3 (all tracks), Wurlitzer organ (4, 5, 7)
- Jimmie Lee Sloas – bass
- Brent Mason – electric guitar
- Jenee Fleenor – fiddle
- Paul Franklin – steel guitar
- Austin Stanley – engineering, mixing
- Colin Lott – engineering assistance
- Phillip Smith – engineering assistance
- Nathan Dantzler – mastering
- Harrison Tate – mastering assistance
- Alyson McAnally – production coordination
- Nathan Keeterle – acoustic guitar (1, 4, 6–8), electric guitar (1–5, 9, 10)
- Kevin Post – Dobro guitar (6)

== Charts ==
Chart performance for Give My Country Back
Chart (2026)	Peak position
US Top Album Sales (Billboard)	27
