= Sinner (Aaron Lewis album) =

Studio album by Aaron Lewis
- Released: September 16, 2016
- Recorded: 2015 in Nashville, Tennessee
- Genres: Country rock; alternative country
- Length: 47:37
- Labels: Dot, Big Machine
- Producer: Buddy Cannon

Aaron Lewis chronology
The Road (2012)	Sinner (2016)	State I'm In (2019)

Singles from Sinner
- 1. "That Ain't Country" Released: June 17, 2016

Sinner is the second solo studio album by an American rock musician Aaron Lewis of the nu metal band Staind. It was released on September 16, 2016, through Dot Records, and produced by Buddy Cannon. The first single, "That Ain't Country", was released on June 17, 2016, which coincided with the album announcement. To support the album, Lewis conducted a series of concerts titled "The Sinner Tour".

Professional ratings
Review scores
Source	Rating
AllMusic	3/5 stars

== Commercial performance ==
Sinner debuted at number four on the US Billboard 200 with 42,000 units sold, 39,000 of which were traditional album sales. It also debuted at number one on the Top Country Albums chart. As of March 2018 the album has sold 146,800 copies in the United States.

== Track listing ==
All tracks are written by Aaron Lewis, except where noted.

No.	Title	Writer(s)	Length
1.	"Sinner" (featuring Willie Nelson)		3:31
2.	"That Ain't Country"		4:02
3.	"Whiskey and You"	Chris Stapleton, Lee Thomas Miller	4:28
4.	"Northern Redneck"		3:39
5.	"Mama"		5:04
6.	"Sunday Every Saturday Night"	Ira Dean, Aaron Lewis	4:59
7.	"Lost and Lonely"		4:57
8.	"Story of My Life"		4:34
9.	"Stuck in These Shoes"		3:44
10.	"I Lost It All"		3:54
11.	"Travelin' Soldier"	Bruce Robison	4:46
Total length:			47:38

== Personnel ==
- Sean R. Badum – assistant engineer
- Wyatt Beard – background vocals
- Jim "Moose" Brown – Hammond B-3 organ, piano, Wurlitzer
- Pat Buchanan – electric guitar
- Jake Burns – assistant engineer
- Buddy Cannon – background vocals
- Tony Castle – engineer, mixing
- Tony Creasman – drums
- Shannon Finnegan – production coordinator
- Paul Franklin – steel guitar
- Tom Freitag – assistant engineer
- Vince Gill – background vocals
- Kevin "Swine" Grantt – bass guitar
- Ted Jensen – mastering
- Ben Kitterman – dobro
- Alison Krauss – background vocals
- Jasper Lemaster – assistant engineer
- Aaron Lewis – lead vocals, background vocals
- Zoe Jane Lewis – background vocals, Lead Vocals on "Travelin' Soldier"
- Brent Mason – baritone guitar, electric guitar
- Seth Morton – assistant engineer
- Willie Nelson – duet vocals on "Sinner"
- Mickey Raphael – harmonica
- Matt Rausch – engineer
- Bobby Terry – acoustic guitar
- Dan Tyminski – acoustic guitar, mandolin, background vocals

== Charts ==
=== Weekly charts ===
Chart (2016)	Peak position
Canadian Albums (Billboard)	36
US Billboard 200	4
US Top Country Albums (Billboard)	1

=== Year-end charts ===
Chart (2016)	Position
US Top Country Albums (Billboard)	38
