= Country Boy (Aaron Lewis song) =

Single by Aaron Lewis

Single by Aaron Lewis featuring George Jones and Charlie Daniels

from the album Town Line
- Released: December 7, 2010
- Genre: Country rock; hard rock; post-grunge
- Length: 4:45
- Label: Stroudavarious
- Songwriter: Aaron Lewis
- Producer: James Stroud

Aaron Lewis singles chronology
"Outside" (2000)	"Country Boy" (2010)	"Endless Summer" (2012)

"Country Boy" is a song by American rock musician Aaron Lewis, and is his first foray into country music. Released on December 7, 2010 through Stroudavarious Records, three versions of the song are featured on Town Line, Lewis' debut EP with a live acoustic version of the song on the iTunes Store deluxe edition of The Road, his debut studio album.

== In popular culture ==
"Country Boy" is the walkout song for UFC featherweight contender Chad Mendes. Lewis performed the song live at UFC 189 in Las Vegas.

== Charts ==
Chart (2011)	Peak position
US Billboard Hot 100	87
US Hot Country Songs (Billboard)	50
US Mainstream Rock (Billboard)	23
US Hot Rock & Alternative Songs (Billboard)	39

== Certifications ==
Region	Certification	Certified units/sales
United States (RIAA)	Platinum	1,021,000

== Awards ==
Year	Association	Category	Result
2011	CMT Music Awards	USA Weekend Breakthrough Video of the Year – "Country Boy"	Nominated
2011	CMT Music Awards	Collaborative Video of the Year – "Country Boy" (with George Jones and Charlie Daniels)	Nominated
