= State I'm In (album) =

Studio album by Aaron Lewis
- Released: April 12, 2019
- Genre: Country rock; alternative country
- Length: 40:25
- Label: Valory
- Producer: Buddy Cannon

Aaron Lewis chronology
Sinner (2016)	State I'm In (2019)	Frayed at Both Ends (2022)

Professional ratings
Review scores
Source	Rating
AllMusic	3.5/5 stars

State I'm In is the third studio album by American rock musician Aaron Lewis of Staind. It was released by the Valory Music division of Big Machine Records on April 12, 2019, a day before Lewis’ 47th birthday. Buddy Cannon is the album's producer.

== Commercial performance ==
State I'm In debuted on the Billboard Top Country Albums chart at No. 2, with 22,000 copies sold (23,000 in equivalent album units) in the first week. The album has sold 41,600 copies as of February 2020.

== Track listing ==
No.	Title	Writer(s)	Length
1.	"The Party's Over"	Aaron Lewis	3:34
2.	"Can't Take Back"	Lewis, Dan Tyminski, Ira Dean	3:39
3.	"Reconsider"	Keith Gattis, Charles Brocco	3:52
4.	"It Keeps On Workin'"	Lewis, Dean, Chris Wallin	4:18
5.	"State I'm In"	Lewis	3:01
6.	"God and Guns"	Lewis, Bobby Pinson	3:46
7.	"Love Me"	Lewis	5:47
8.	"If I Were the Devil"	Trent Tomlinson, Houston Phillips	3:59
9.	"Burnt the Sawmill Down"	Keith Whitley, Jim Elliot	3:31
10.	"The Bottom"	Waylon Payne	4:58
Total length:			40:25

== Personnel ==
Adapted from liner notes.

- Wyatt Beard – background vocals (tracks 1, 4, 6)
- Ron Block – acoustic guitar (track 2)
- Jim "Moose" Brown – electric piano (track 4), organ (tracks 2, 8), piano (track 7)
- Pat Buchanan – electric guitar (tracks 1, 2, 4, 7, 8)
- Buddy Cannon – background vocals (track 6)
- Melonie Cannon – background vocals (track 1)
- Tony Creasman – drums (all tracks)
- Sidney Cox – background vocals (track 10)
- Suzanne Cox – background vocals (track 10)
- Paul Franklin – steel guitar (all tracks)
- Vince Gill – electric guitar (track 7)
- Kevin "Swine" Grantt – bass guitar (all tracks)
- Ben Haggard – electric guitar (track 8)
- Ben Isaacs – background vocals (track 3)
- Sonya Isaacs – background vocals (track 3)
- Jamey Johnson – background vocals (track 5)
- Ben Kitterman – dobro (all tracks except 10)
- Alison Krauss – background vocals (track 5)
- Aaron Lewis – lead vocals (all tracks)
- Brent Mason – electric guitar (tracks 1, 2, 4, 7, 8)
- Danny Parks – acoustic guitar (tracks 3, 5, 6, 9, 10)
- Mickey Raphael – harmonica (tracks 2, 9)
- Mike Rojas – accordion (track 5), piano (tracks 5, 6, 9), organ (tracks 3, 10)
- Bobby Terry – acoustic guitar (tracks 1, 4, 7, 8, 10), electric guitar (tracks 3, 5, 6, 9)
- Dan Tyminski – acoustic guitar (tracks 1, 2, 4, 8, 9), mandolin (track 2), background vocals (tracks 2, 8, 9)

== Charts ==
Chart performance for State I'm In
Chart (2019)	Peak position
US Billboard 200	18
US Top Country Albums (Billboard)	2
