= Re.present =

re.present

Studio album by Jimmie's Chicken Shack
- Released: April 27, 2004
- Recorded: 2004
- Genre: Alternative rock, post-grunge, alternative metal, nu metal
- Length: 39:43
- Label: Koch
- Producer: Jimi Haha, Frank Marchand, Richard James Burgess

Jimmie's Chicken Shack chronology
Bring Your Own Stereo (1999)	re.present (2004)	Fail on Cue (2008)

Professional ratings
Review scores
Source	Rating
AllMusic	2/5 stars
Entertainment Weekly	C
Sputnikmusic	(4/5)

re.present is the third major label studio album released by Jimmie's Chicken Shack, released in 2004. The album was a departure from the light and popular punk rock sound of Bring Your Own Stereo as this album leans towards a darker sound influenced by nu metal as it was showcased in the lead single "Falling Out" which features Aaron Lewis of Staind.

== Track listing ==
No.	Title	Length
1.	"Falling Out" (Jimi Haha; A.J. Lewis)	5:07
2.	"Quitter" (Jimi Haha)	2:49
3.	"Happiness" (Jimi Haha; D. Dowling; C. Lemon; M. Sipple)	3:28
4.	"Ghettoverit" (Jimi Haha; B. Walker)	4:02
5.	"Living with Ghosts" (Jimi Haha)	4:25
6.	"Strange" (Jimi Haha; M. Tremonti)	3:32
7.	"Dead Sleep" (Jimi Haha)	3:11
8.	"Beautiful" (Jimi Haha; D. Dowling; D. Dorsey; M. Sipple)	3:42
9.	"Leech" (Jimi Haha;A. Alexakis)	2:44
10.	"Unshaken" (Jimi Haha; D. Dorsey; C. Hean; K. Murphy)	3:21
11.	"Paper Dolls" (Jimi Haha; J. Wozniak)	3:22

== Notes ==
- Song "Paper Dolls" was originally written by Jimi Haha and John Wozniak. Marcy Playground put their version of the song on their 2004 album MP3.

== Personnel ==
- Jimi Haha - guitar, vocals
- Derrick Dorsey - bass
- Casey "Onion"/"Stacey" Hean - guitar, keyboards, backing vocals
- Kevin Murphy - drums, percussion, backing vocals
- Aaron Lewis - backing vocals on "Falling Out"
- Art Alexakis - backing vocals on "Leech"
