= Am I the Only One (Aaron Lewis song) =

Single by Aaron Lewis

from the album Frayed at Both Ends
- Released: July 2, 2021
- Genre: Country
- Length: 4:29
- Label: Valory; Big Machine
- Songwriters: Aaron Lewis; Ira Dean; Jeffrey Steele
- Producers: Aaron Lewis; Ira Dean

Aaron Lewis singles chronology
"It Keeps On Workin'" (2019)	"Am I the Only One" (2021)

Music video
- "Am I the Only One" on YouTube

"Am I the Only One" is a song co-written and recorded by American singer Aaron Lewis. It was released on July 2, 2021, as the lead single from Lewis' fourth solo album Frayed at Both Ends. Released through Big Machine Records' Valory imprint, it is a protest song with a politically conservative message. The song is Lewis's highest-charting solo entry on the Billboard Hot Country Songs chart, where it became the ninth song ever to debut at number one; it also holds his highest solo position on the Billboard Hot 100, debuting at number fourteen.

== Content and history ==
Lewis released the song digitally on July 2, 2021, and Big Machine Records imprint Valory Music Group was released to country radio on July 26, 2021. Prior to releasing it as a single, Lewis performed it for the first time on March 12, 2021, at Billy Bob's Texas, a nightclub in Fort Worth, Texas.

In it, he expresses his conservative viewpoints. He criticizes the destruction and removal of Confederate monuments and expresses opposition to Bruce Springsteen's relatively liberal views. Lewis co-wrote the song with Ira Dean (of Trick Pony) and Jeffrey Steele; Lewis and Dean also produced the track. The song has been described as an acoustic ballad.

== Critical reception ==
BJ Mac of The Nash News reviewed the song positively, calling it "a mellow, somber song about the relatable feeling of nostalgia and unease when the world seems to be changing too much and too abruptly". Online music publication MetalSucks panned the song, calling the lyrics "stupid" and the patriotic lyrics hypocritical, considering Lewis himself had previously publicly sung "The Star-Spangled Banner" incorrectly, and has never "taken a bullet" for his country, despite the song suggesting otherwise. Political commentator David Corn suggested that the song might encourage a repeat of the 2021 United States Capitol attack. Writer Bob Lefsetz criticized Big Machine CEO Scott Borchetta for releasing the song, which he felt "should have been played at CPAC, in between speeches". Borchetta responded that his "job has never been to tell my artists what to sing and write about".

== Music video ==
The music video was released on October 1, 2021. According to the report of Breitbart News, the video is "set the anthem to a montage of patriotic Americana as well as images from Black Lives Matter riots and COVID-19 shutdowns", and merges scenes of "closed businesses and empty store shelves during the COVID-19 pandemic".

== Commercial performance ==
"Am I the Only One" debuted at the number one position on the Billboard Hot Country Songs chart dated for July 17, 2021, making it only the ninth song ever to debut at the top of that chart. The same week, it entered the Billboard Hot 100 at number fourteen. Both of these positions are Lewis's highest solo rankings on either chart.

== Personnel ==
Adapted from AllMusic.

- Jake Burns – recording
- Adam Chagnon – engineer
- Matt Combs – cello, viola, violin
- Ira Dean – producer
- Ted Jensen – mastering
- Brian Judd – mixing assistant
- Ben Kitterman – production coordination
- Aaron Lewis – vocals, producer
- Chris Lord-Alge – mixing
- Patrick Prophet – assistant engineer
- Matt Rausch – recording
- Doug Rich – production coordination
- Bennett Salvay – arranger
- Janice Soled – production coordination
- Seth Taylor – acoustic guitar
- Biff Watson – acoustic guitar

== Charts ==
=== Weekly charts ===
Weekly chart performance for "Am I the Only One"
Chart (2021)	Peak position
Global 200 (Billboard)	51
US Billboard Hot 100	14
US Country Airplay (Billboard)	52
US Hot Country Songs (Billboard)	1

=== Year-end charts ===
Year-end chart performance for "Am I the Only One"
Chart (2021)	Position
US Hot Country Songs (Billboard)	84

== Certifications ==
Region	Certification	Certified units/sales
United States (RIAA)	Gold	500,000^{‡}
^{‡} Sales+streaming figures based on certification alone.
