= Fail on Cue =

Studio album by Jimmie's Chicken Shack
- Released: April 15, 2008
- Recorded: 2008
- Genre: Alternative rock
- Length: 33:13
- Label: Fowl
- Producer: Jimmie's Chicken Shack

Jimmie's Chicken Shack chronology
re.present (2004)	Fail on Cue (2008)	2econds (2022)

Fail on Cue is the fourth studio album released in 2008 by Jimmie's Chicken Shack.

== Track listing ==
1. 17 - 2:39
2. Caught Down - 3:03
3. Mutha Luvas - 3:41
4. Friendly Fire - 3:29
5. The Quiet Ones - 3:27
6. Another Great Idea - 3:12
7. Good at It - 2:56
8. Making Babies - 3:29
9. Waiting Room - 3:09 (Fugazi cover)
10. Radio Song - 4:08

== Personnel ==
- Jimi Haha - Guitar, Vocals
- Matt Jones - Guitar, Backing Vocals
- Christian Valiente - Bass, Backing Vocals
- Jerome Maffeo - Drums, Percussion, Backing Vocals
