= Town Line =

EP by Aaron Lewis
- Released: March 1, 2011
- Genre: Alternative country; country rock
- Length: 32:57
- Label: Stroudavarious
- Producer: Aaron Lewis; James Stroud

Aaron Lewis chronology
Town Line (2011)	The Road (2012)

Singles from Town Line
- 1. "Country Boy" Released: December 7, 2010

Professional ratings
Review scores
Source	Rating
AllMusic	1/5 stars
Country Weekly	3/5 stars
Engine 145	2/5 stars

Town Line is the first EP by American rock musician Aaron Lewis, and is his first solo release. An extended play consisting of country songs, it was released on March 1, 2011, on Stroudavarious Records. As of the chart dated September 3, 2011, the album has sold 200,208 copies in the US.

== Content ==
The first single, "Country Boy", which features George Jones and Charlie Daniels, was released on December 7, 2010. This song has charted on both Hot Country Songs and Rock Songs. The track "Tangled Up in You" is a re-recording of a song from Staind's album The Illusion of Progress.

Live versions of the songs "Vicious Circles" and "Country Boy" also appear on the deluxe edition of Lewis' 2012 album, The Road.

== Critical reception ==
Giving it three stars out of five, Jessica Phillips of Country Weekly thought that the songs were "rich with imagery". She also praised Lewis for "resist[ing] the temptation to don a faux twang", but criticized the single "Country Boy" as "an unfortunately overextended string of rural impressions". Sam Gazdziak of Engine 145 rated it two stars out of five, calling "Country Boy" "turgid" and "polarizing", also criticizing the three versions present on the EP.

== Track listing ==
All tracks are written by Aaron Lewis.

No.	Title	Length
1.	"The Story Never Ends"	4:47
2.	"Vicious Circles"	5:07
3.	"Country Boy" (featuring George Jones and Charlie Daniels)	4:43
4.	"Tangled Up in You" (featuring Alexa Carter)	4:29
5.	"Massachusetts"	5:03
6.	"Country Boy" (radio edit)	4:20
7.	"Country Boy" (acoustic version)	4:20

== Personnel ==
Adapted from liner notes.

- Eddie Bayers – drums
- Alexa Carter – background vocals on "Tangled Up in You"
- Charlie Daniels – guitar, fiddle, and recitation vocals on "Country Boy"
- Paul Franklin – steel guitar
- Tony Harrell – B-3 organ, piano
- George Jones – guest vocals on "Country Boy"
- Ben Kitterman – dobro
- Aaron Lewis – acoustic guitar, lead vocals
- Brent Mason – electric guitar
- Larry Paxton – bass guitar
- Scotty Sanders – steel guitar
- Biff Watson – acoustic guitar
- Chris Young – background vocals on "Country Boy"

== Charts ==
=== Weekly charts ===
Chart (2011)	Peak position
US Billboard 200	7
US Top Country Albums (Billboard)	1
US Independent Albums (Billboard)	3
US Top Rock Albums (Billboard)	3

=== Year-end charts ===
Chart (2011)	Position
US Billboard 200	166
US Top Country Albums (Billboard)	32
US Top Rock Albums (Billboard)	31

=== Singles ===
Year	Single	Peak chart positions			
Year	Single	US	US Country	US Main	US Rock
2011	"Country Boy" (with George Jones and Charlie Daniels)	87	50	23	39
