= CreatiVets =

American non-profit organization assisting veterans

- Formation: 2013
- Founders: Richard Casper, Linda Tarrson
- Type: Nonprofit 501(c)(3) organization
- Purpose: Veterans services
- Headquarters: Nashville, Tennessee
- Executive director: Richard Casper
- Key people: Will Parker (board chair), Nanette Leonard (vice chair)
- Staff: 7

CreatiVets is a United States non-profit organization that teaches United States Armed Forces veterans to use visual arts and music as a means of addressing their unseen wounds of war.

CreatiVets was co-founded by Richard Casper and Linda Tarrson in July 2013 in Chicago, Illinois, to help combat the staggering number of suicides by veterans who transition home from war. CreatiVets' mission is to empower wounded veterans to heal through the arts and music. It operates as a 501(c)(3) organization.

To enhance its mission, CreatiVets has partnered with other organizations such as The Grand Ole Opry, Country Music Hall of Fame and Museum, Big Machine Label Group, Music Has Value, Amazon Music, Wounded Warrior Project, Tee It Up For The Troops, Joni & Friends, Camp Southern Ground and Operation Stand Down. CreatiVets' art programs have been hosted by some of the top universities in the country including, School of the Art Institute of Chicago (SAIC), University of Southern California (USC), and Virginia Commonwealth University (VCU).

All of CreatiVets programs focus on storytelling through the arts.

== Incorporation ==
CreatiVets filed for incorporation with Jesse White, Secretary of State in Illinois on July 19, 2013. CreatiVets was granted 501(c)(3) status by the Department of Treasury Internal Revenue Service on January 30, 2014, with a public charity status of 170(b)(1)(A)(vi).

In 2020, CreatiVets opened its headquarters in Nashville, Tennessee. CreatiVets leases the office space from Operation Stand Down.

== Backstory ==
Richard Casper joined one of the United States Marine Corps' most elite units, MSC-CD (Marine Security Company, Camp David) and worked at Camp David guarding President George W. Bush. He then deployed to Iraq in October 2006 where he was "hit by an improvised explosive device four times and sustained multiple concussions, culminating in a traumatic brain injury that finally sent him back home" where he suffered from "post-traumatic stress, depression and severe anxiety." Casper explains, "I discovered songwriting and the arts, and it saved my life. I knew that other combat vets [might not] turn to art like I did, so I decided to make programs they would want to be a part of."

Richard is a graduate of the School of the Art Institute of Chicago (SAIC), an alumnus of the George W. Bush Presidential Center's Stand-To Veteran Leadership Program. and was named a "Next Generation Leader" in 2017 by Time magazine.

== Music ==
CreatiVets flies veterans from all over the United States to Nashville, Tennessee, to write their story into a song. "The veterans that come through CreatiVets' program are not typically singers or songwriters." CreatiVets seeks "to teach [veterans] songwriting as a skill to help them heal through the creation of music."

In July 2020, CreatiVets partnered with Big Machine Records and Music Has Value to release music created through the CreatiVets songwriting program.

The album Veteran Songs was released on July 3, 2020. Veteran Songs includes 11 songs written through the CreatiVets program with veteran participants and professional songwriters.

The follow-up EP Veterans Day Special was released on November 6, 2020. "Veterans Day Special" includes 3 songs. Two were written through the CreatiVets program and the third is a LIVE performance re-release of Brantley Gilberts' "One Hell of an Amen". (13) Scott Borchetta, founder of Big Machine Label Group said the CreatiVets "Veterans Day Special" EP "needs the celebrity aspect to cut through the noise. I really feel that as soon as this gets out among veterans, it's going to be a movement. We have really good songs, and we're looking for that one that takes off and gets tens of millions of streams. That's going to happen."

CreatiVets partnered with Amazon Music and speaking the words "Alexa, play music by veterans" to an Alexa device will play CreatiVets music.

== Discography ==
Veteran Songs Details – Release date: July 3, 2020 – Formats: digital download – Peak chart position: N/A Veterans Day Special Details – Release date: November 6, 2020 – Formats: digital download – Peak chart position: N/A

== Art ==
CreatiVets offers conceptual art courses that teach "various art forms such as creative writing, woodworking and digital media to foster self-expression and transform their stories of trauma and struggle."

Art created through the CreatiVets art programs has been displayed at gallery showings at Monthaven Arts & Cultural Center (MACC), National Veterans Art Museum (NVAM), School of the Art Institute of Chicago (SAIC), University of Southern California (USC), Virginia Commonwealth University (VCU). In December 2021, San Antonio International Airport (SAT) and the Galleries at SAT exhibited the artworks by Jason Myers. It was named “From War to Words – A Visual Voices Portrait Series by Jason Myers”.

== Donations and spending ==
CreatiVets operates on a July – June fiscal year. In fiscal year 2019, CreatiVets operated with total revenue of $397,635 and total expenses were $302,096 according to their Form 990. Total program expenses were $219,722 which shows 72.7% of every dollar spent goes to helping veterans in need.

CreatiVets has an independent third-party audit of its financial statements each fiscal year.

== Charity ratings and memberships ==
- Guidestar – Platinum Seal of Transparency
- Combined Federal Campaign (CFC) – Combined Federal Campaign
- Giving Matters – CreatiVets

== See also ==
- Operation Stand Down
