= The Road (Aaron Lewis album) =

Studio album by Aaron Lewis
- Released: November 13, 2012
- Genres: Country rock; alternative country
- Length: 41:14; 70:14 (iTunes deluxe edition)
- Label: Blaster
- Producers: Aaron Lewis; James Stroud

Aaron Lewis chronology
Town Line (2011)	The Road (2012)	Sinner (2016)

Singles from The Road
- 1. "Endless Summer" Released: March 5, 2012; 2. "Forever" Released: November 12, 2012; 3. "Grandaddy's Gun" Released: June 24, 2013

Professional ratings
Review scores
Source	Rating
aNewRisingMusic	4/5 stars
AllMusic	2/5 stars

The Road, is the debut, full-length studio album by American Staind frontman Aaron Lewis. His second country music effort, it was released by Blaster Records on November 13, 2012.

== Content ==
The song "Granddaddy's Gun" was previously recorded by Rhett Akins on the 2010 album Michael Waddell's Bone Collector: The Brotherhood Album. It was also recorded by Blake Shelton on his 2013 album, Based on a True Story.... The iTunes deluxe edition of the album features five live bonus tracks. It includes a cover of the song "What Hurts the Most", which was previously recorded by Mark Wills and Rascal Flatts. Two more songs, "Vicious Circles" and "Country Boy", originally appeared on Lewis' 2011 EP, Town Line.

== Commercial reception ==
The album debuted on Billboard's Top Country Albums chart at No. 7, selling 21,000 copies. The album has sold 220,000 copies in the United States as of August 2016.

== Track listing ==
All tracks are written by Aaron Lewis except "Granddaddy's Gun", written by Rhett Akins, Dallas Davidson, and Bobby Pinson.

No.	Title	Length
1.	"75"	5:43
2.	"The Road"	2:50
3.	"Endless Summer"	3:22
4.	"Red, White & Blue"	5:43
5.	"Lessons Learned"	3:25
6.	"Forever"	4:30
7.	"Granddaddy's Gun" (Rhett Akins cover)	3:43
8.	"State Lines"	2:51
9.	"Anywhere but Here"	5:07
10.	"Party in Hell"	4:06
Total length:		41:14

iTunes deluxe edition
No.	Title	Writer(s)	Length
11.	"75" (live acoustic)		5:46
12.	"Forever" (live acoustic)		6:11
13.	"What Hurts the Most" (live acoustic)	Jeffrey Steele; Steve Robson	4:59
14.	"Vicious Circles" (live acoustic)		5:19
15.	"Country Boy" (live acoustic)		6:45
Total length:			70:14

== Reception ==
Upon its release, The Road received generally mixed to positive reviews from most music critics. Rick Florino with Artistdirect rated the album five out of five stars. He praised Lewis' performance, saying "he's a vivid storyteller and brilliant lyricist". Daryl Addison of Great American Country was positive in saying, "on The Road, Aaron creates a work that honors country tradition while injecting his own soul and experience". Dan MacIntosh of Roughstock.com rated the album four stars, saying, "that it sounds like an honest to goodness country album, start to finish" and that "The Road is positive proof that Aaron Lewis has the musical goods and can most certainly deliver". NoizeNews rated the album a 9 out of 10 stating, "The Road is a simple album with strong lyrics and instrumentation that highlight the beauty of Aaron Lewis' voice".

Others were more critical of Lewis' efforts. Gary Suarez of PopMatters gave an average rating of 4 out of 10 rating stating, "Lewis shifts effortlessly from Staind's emotive construction rock to sincere country on his full-length solo debut The Road. Stephen Thomas Erlewine with AllMusic rated the album 2 out of 5 stars. Erlewine was critical in saying, "his music doesn't have much color; it's by-the-numbers red state country, hitting all of its marks and making no lasting impression".

== Personnel ==
- Eddie Bayers – drums
- Jim "Moose" Brown – piano, B-3 organ
- Perry Coleman – background vocals
- Paul Franklin – steel guitar
- Tony Harrell – piano, B-3 organ
- Mark Hill – bass guitar
- Ben Kitterman – dobro, acoustic guitar
- Aaron Lewis – lead vocals, acoustic guitar
- Sol Littlefield – electric guitar
- B. James Lowry – acoustic guitar
- Brent Mason – electric guitar
- Michael Rhodes – bass guitar

== Chart performance ==
=== Album ===
Chart (2012)	Peak position
U.S. Billboard 200	30
U.S. Billboard Top Country Albums	7

=== Singles ===
Year	Single	Peak chart positions	
Year	Single	US Country	US Country Airplay
2012	"Endless Summer"	39	—
2012	"Forever"	50	38
2013	"Granddaddy's Gun"	—	46
"—" denotes releases that did not chart
