= Break the Cycle =

2001 studio album by Staind

Studio album by Staind
- Released: May 8, 2001
- Recorded: August–December 2000
- Studios: NRG (Los Angeles, CA); Long Farm View (North Brookfield, MA); Southbeach (Miami Beach, FL); Electric Lady (New York City, NY)
- Genres: Nu metal; alternative metal; alternative rock
- Length: 50:49
- Labels: Flip; Elektra
- Producer: Josh Abraham

Staind chronology
Dysfunction (1999)	Break the Cycle (2001)	14 Shades of Grey (2003)

Singles from Break the Cycle
- 1. "It's Been Awhile" Released: March 18, 2001; 2. "Fade" Released: August 20, 2001; 3. "Outside" Released: November 26, 2001; 4. "For You" Released: December 19, 2001; 5. "Epiphany" Released: August 2002

Break the Cycle is the third studio album by American rock band Staind, released through Flip Records and Elektra Records on May 8, 2001. It is Staind's most successful album to date and was the album that broke them into the mainstream. It was a huge international success for the band, as it spent three weeks at number-one position in the U.S. album charts and many weeks in the top-10 album charts of the Billboard 200, the UK and New Zealand. It sold at least 4 million copies in 2001. The album was certified 7× platinum by the RIAA for sales of over seven million units in the U.S on September 3, 2026.

== Sales ==
Because of the record's high recording budget of $800,000, there were many worries about whether the album would be successful, and the album almost had to top charts internationally just to break even with studio costs. Break the Cycle debuted at number one on the Billboard 200, with first-week sales of at least 717,600 copies. It remained at the top the following week, with 329,299 copies. In the third week it was number one again, with 244,698 copies. In the fourth week it dropped to number two, with 221,179 copies. It sold over 1 million copies in the first three weeks. The album sold 4,900,000 copies in the US and was certified 7× platinum by the RIAA. Break the Cycle also topped charts in the UK, where it was certified platinum; in New Zealand; and in Canada, where it had multiplatinum status. In 2001 the album was the tenth best-selling globally, selling 5.6 million copies.

== Reception ==
Professional ratings
Aggregate scores
Source	Rating
Metacritic	55/100
Review scores
Source	Rating
AllMusic	3/5 stars
Blender	3/5 stars
E!	B
Entertainment Weekly	C
Dotmusic	7/10
Drowned in Sound	4/10
Kerrang!	(2001) (2011)
NME	2/10
Q	2/5 stars
Rolling Stone	3.5/5 stars

Initial critical response ranged from mixed to average. At Metacritic, which assigns a normalized rating out of 100 to reviews from mainstream critics, the album has received an average score of 55, based on nine reviews. Michael Gallucci of AllMusic gave Break the Cycle three out of five stars, saying, "Cycle is ultimately no more than 50 minutes of standard-issue desolation" and "Staind wraps up all this pain in deceivingly melodic packages, sort of like Nirvana's "All Apologies" without the depth."

Metal Injection stated that the album "helped define early-2000s alternative rock."

== Track listing ==
All lyrics are written by Aaron Lewis; all music is composed by Staind except where noted.

No.	Title	Music	Length
1.	"Open Your Eyes"		3:50
2.	"Pressure"	Staind; Josh Abraham	3:22
3.	"Fade"		4:03
4.	"It's Been Awhile"		4:24
5.	"Change"		3:36
6.	"Can't Believe"		2:47
7.	"Epiphany"	Aaron Lewis	4:19
8.	"Suffer"		4:00
9.	"Warm Safe Place"		4:36
10.	"For You"		3:25
11.	"Outside"	Lewis	4:53
12.	"Waste"		3:56
13.	"Take It"		3:37
Total length:			50:49

U.S. edition + bonus track
No.	Title	Length
14.	"It's Been Awhile" (acoustic)	4:30
Total length:		55:19

Australian and European edition + bonus track
No.	Title	Length
14.	"Outside" (Family Values Version 1999)	5:40
Total length:		56:29

== Personnel ==
Staind

- Aaron Lewis – lead vocals, rhythm guitar
- Mike Mushok – lead guitar
- Johnny April – bass, backing vocals
- Jon Wysocki – drums

Additional musicians

- Fred Durst – additional backing vocals on "Outside" (live version)
- Mike Kezner – sitar on "Warm Safe Place"

Artwork

- Craig Howell – art direction, illustration
- Gayle Boulware – art direction
- Clay Patrick McBride – photography
- John Baptiste – styling

Technical personnel

- Josh Abraham – production
- Joseph Bogan – assistant engineers
- Paul Conaway – assistant engineers
- Steve Sisco – assistant mixing engineer
- Jordan Schur – executive producer
- Vlado Meller – mastering
- Andy Wallace – mixing
- Dave Dominguez – recording

== Charts ==
=== Weekly charts ===
Weekly chart performance for Break the Cycle
Chart (2001)	Peak position
Australian Albums (ARIA)	18
Austrian Albums (Ö3 Austria)	6
Belgian Albums (Ultratop Flanders)	27
Belgian Albums (Ultratop Wallonia)	34
Canadian Albums (Billboard)	1
Canadian Metal Albums (Nielsen SoundScan)	1
Danish Albums (Hitlisten)	5
Dutch Albums (Album Top 100)	36
Europe (European Top 100 Albums)	6
Finnish Albums (Suomen virallinen lista)	26
French Albums (SNEP)	48
German Albums (Offizielle Top 100)	5
Irish Albums (IRMA)	1
Italian Albums (FIMI)	13
New Zealand Albums (RMNZ)	1
Norwegian Albums (VG-lista)	23
Portuguese Albums (AFP)	4
Scottish Albums (Official Charts)	1
Spanish Albums (PROMUSICAE)	46
Swedish Albums (Sverigetopplistan)	9
Swedish Hard Rock Albums (Sverigetopplistan)	1
Swiss Albums (Schweizer Hitparade)	18
UK Albums (Official Charts)	1
UK Rock & Metal Albums (Official Charts)	1
US Billboard 200	1

=== Year-end charts ===
2001 year-end chart performance for Break the Cycle
Chart (2001)	Position
Australian Albums (ARIA)	94
Canadian Albums (Nielsen SoundScan)	22
European Albums (Music & Media)	49
German Albums (Offizielle Top 100)	76
New Zealand Albums (RMNZ)	15
Swedish Albums (Sverigetopplistan)	94
UK Albums (OCC)	58
US Billboard 200	7
Worldwide Albums (IFPI)	8

2002 year-end chart performance for Break the Cycle
Chart (2002)	Position
Canadian Alternative Albums (Nielsen SoundScan)	90
Canadian Metal Albums (Nielsen SoundScan)	42
German Albums (Offizielle Top 100)	77
US Billboard 200	56

=== Decade-end charts ===
Decade-end chart performance for Break the Cycle
Chart (2000–2009)	Position
US Billboard 200	41

== Certifications ==
Certifications for Break the Cycle
Region	Certification	Certified units/sales
Australia (ARIA)	Gold	35,000^{^}
Canada (Music Canada)	2× Platinum	200,000^{^}
Germany (BVMI)	Gold	150,000^{^}
New Zealand (RMNZ)	2× Platinum	30,000^{^}
Sweden (GLF)	Gold	40,000^{^}
United Kingdom (BPI)	Platinum	300,000^{^}
United States (RIAA)	7× Platinum	7,000,000^{‡} / 4,900,000
^{^} Shipments figures based on certification alone.^{‡} Sales+streaming figures based on certification alone.

== Break the Cycle (25th Anniversary Live) ==
Break the Cycle (25th Anniversary Live)

Live album by Staind
- Released: August 21, 2026
- Recorded: May 8, 2021
- Venues: Open Square, Holyoke, Massachusetts
- Genres: Nu metal; alternative rock; alternative metal
- Length: 52:04
- Labels: Alchemy; BMG
- Producer: Johnny K

Staind chronology
Confessions of the Fallen (2023)	Break the Cycle (25th Anniversary Live) (2026)	The Space Between the Darkness and the Light (2027)

Singles from Break the Cycle (25th Anniversary Live)
- 1. "It's Been Awhile" Released: June 12, 2026; 2. "Fade" Released: July 23, 2026

Break the Cycle (25th Anniversary Live) is a live album by Staind, released on August 21, 2026, commemorating the twenty-fifth anniversary of Break the Cycle. The album is taken from a full-album performance at the Open Square mixed-use complex in Holyoke, Massachusetts.

=== Personnel ===
Staind

- Aaron Lewis – vocals
- Mike Mushok – guitar
- Johnny April – bass
- Sal Giancarelli – drums

Production

- Johnny K – production, mixing, mastering
- Ted Jensen – mastering

=== Charts ===
Chart (2026)	Peak position
US Top Album Sales (Billboard)	28
US Vinyl Albums (Billboard)	24
