= Jimmie's Chicken Shack =

American rock band

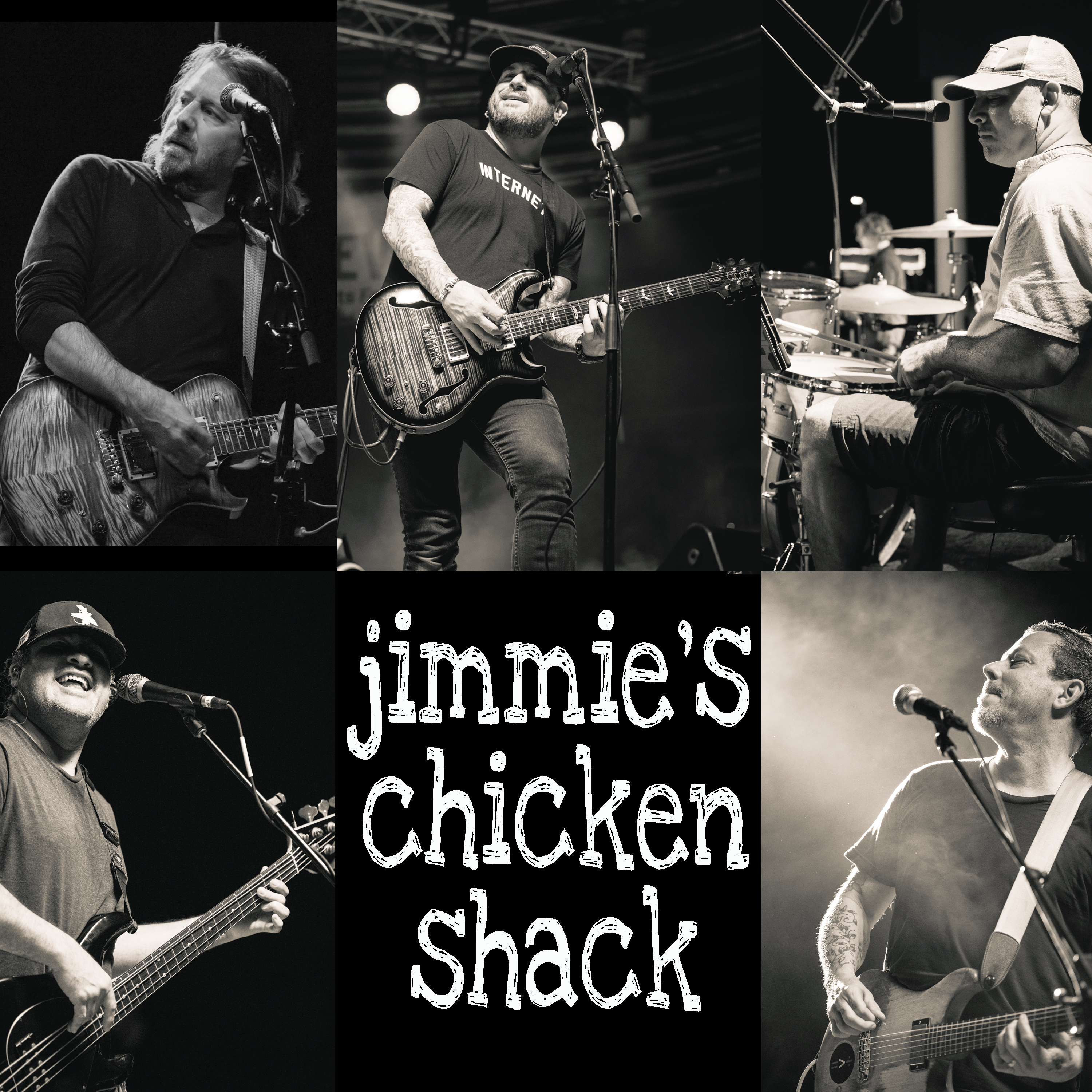

Background information
- Origin: Annapolis, Maryland, U.S.
- Genres: Alternative rock, post-grunge, funk metal
- Years active: 1993–present
- Labels: Fowl, Def Jam, Koch, Rocket
- Members: Jimi Haha; Bryan Ewald; Christian Valiente; Jerome Maffeo; Matt Jones
- Past members: Derrick Dorsey; Kevin Murphy; Mike Sipple; Dave "Double D" Dowling; Che Colavita Lemon; Jim Chaney; Jim McD; Matt Jones; Casey Hean; Island Styles

Jimmie's Chicken Shack is an American alternative rock band from Annapolis, Maryland. They are best known for their singles "High" and "Do Right". In 1996 they signed to Elton John's Rocket Records and released two major-label albums, Pushing the Salmanilla Envelope and Bring Your Own Stereo. Both LPs enjoyed minor chart, radio, and MTV success and produced their best-known hits, "High" and "Do Right." After years of squabbling with their label and finally being set free from their contract, the band released three more albums independently, re.present, Fail on Cue, and 2econds.

== History ==
=== Early years (1993–1996) ===
Chicken Scratch was recorded by Mark Strazza at Hound Sound in Baltimore in 1993 for $600, after the band was together for 6 months. It was only released on cassette. Spit Burger Lottery was recorded by Mike Forjione at The Mansion in Annapolis in 1994 for $400. It was only released on cassette. 2 For 1 was released on CD in 1995. The band took both cassettes and released them on their first CD. They swapped the order so that Spit Burger Lottery started the CD, then Chicken Scratch. Jimi Haha created the album art on a photocopy machine at Office Depot. Giving Something Back was a live record recorded at multiple venues in and around Baltimore including Hammerjacks, Graffitis and 8X10. Their soundman at the time, Jamie Rephann, would later work with acts like 311, Jane's Addiction, ZZ Top and many others. The record was released at a sold-out show at Hammerjacks in Baltimore. It was released on Fowl Records, a label co-founded by band member Jimi Haha.

=== Rocket/Island years (1996–2004) ===
Singles from ...Pushing the Salmanilla Envelope were "High," "Dropping Anchor," "Blood," and "Another Day." "High" and "Dropping Anchor" both have music videos. The video for "High" was shown on MTV's 120 Minutes. Many of the songs on Pushing the Salmanilla Envelope were included on previous independent releases. It was produced by Steven Haigler and mixed by Tom Lord-Alge. "High" went to #10 on the Active Rock chart in Billboard Magazine. It was released on Rocket Records, which was started by Elton John and a subsidiary of Universal. Bring Your Own Stereo was released by Island/Def Jam in 1999. The time between the two major releases was a troubled time for the band internally. There were several changes of members and trouble with the major label as they were shunted from Rocket/Island to Rocket/A&M then back to Rocket/Island and after the sale of Polygram to Universal Music Group, they were moved onto Island Def Jam. "Do Right", "Trash" and "Lazy Boy Dash" were singles released from Bring Your Own Stereo. "Do Right" was the first single released and the only JCS music video to make it onto MTV's Total Request Live with Carson Daly. "Trash" received little airplay but was played live on a music show on the USA Network. A promo single of "Lazy Boy Dash" was released when it was featured in the 2000 movie The In Crowd. "Ooh" was featured in the 2000 movie Pay It Forward. It was produced by Jim Wirt and mixed by Tom Lord-Alge, Chris Lord-Alge and David Leonard. The video for "Do Right" aired as Buzzworthy on Total Request Live and other shows on MTV. "Do Right" went to #8 on the Alternative chart in Billboard. Early releases of the album included a card to mail to Fowl Records for a free copy of the Slow Change EP. This EP is now rare. The tour for these albums was with bands such as 311, Live, Everclear, Creed, Fuel, Finger Eleven, Joydrop, Self, Earth to Andy, Sumack and many others. In January 2000, the band was chosen as openers for 311 for a 27-show tour, spanning from February 21 to March 29, with Jimmie's Chicken Shack as the sole opening act (including one special guest appearance by Incubus at a Winston-Salem show).

=== Koch Records (2004–2008) ===
After fighting for nearly three years to get liberated from Island Def Jam, they released re.present on Koch Records in April 2004. "Falling Out" (featuring Aaron Lewis of Staind) was the only single released from re.present. A music video was made for the single and received limited airplay through various outlets. This album was recorded by Frank Marchand and mixed at Waterford Digital in Severn, Maryland. It was released on Koch Records. Fail On Cue was released in January 2008 on Fowl Records. Some of the new songs on the album are "Mutha Luvas," "The Quiet Ones," "Another Great Idea," and "Making Babies." The album also included the band's second studio-recorded cover of a song, Fugazi's "Waiting Room". This record was recorded by Jerome Maffeo in Jerome and Christian's house in Catonsville, Maryland. It was released on Fowl Records.

=== Solo projects (2002–current) ===
Jimi Haha started a band in 2002 called Jarflys. They put out a record called Anonymous. They continue to play in Annapolis. They have never had a band practice. The band is Jimi on guitar and vocals, Bryan Ewald on guitar, Noel White (Aidan Ewald currently) on drums, and Larry Melton on bass. It was released on Fowl Records. Jimi Haha put out his first solo CD under the name Mend The Hollow in December 2016. The record was produced by Jim Wirt, who produced J.C.S.'s Bring Your Own Stereo and was mixed by Tom Lord-Alge and mastered by Robert Ludwig. All of the odd-numbered songs were recorded live in a few hours by the members of Jarflys. The even-numbered songs were tracked with Gingerwolf on lap steel, Dominic Fragman on drums and Jim Wirt on bass and keyboards. It was released on Fowl Records.

=== 2econds and recent activities (2021–current) ===
2econds is the band's most recent studio record. Featured players are Jerome Maffeo, Christian Valiente, Island Styles (now with the band Candlebox). The album was produced by Jim Wirt at Superior Sound in Cleveland, Ohio. The LP was released October 25, 2022, by Fowl Records. Matt Jones, after playing with the band Cowboy Mouth from New Orleans for several years, rejoined the band to make it a five-piece live line-up. Bryan Ewald, from the bands Jarflys and Starbelly as well as being the guru for Paul Reed Smith Guitars YouTube demos, joined the band with Island Styles' departure. The band did a national tour with Everclear and Marcy Playground in late 2024. J.C.S. released P.T.S.E. Live, a live version of their Pushing The Salmanilla Envelope record, in 2024 and B.Y.O.S. Live, a live version of their Bring Your Own Stereo, in early 2025.

== Members ==
Role	Album						
Role	2 for 1 Special	Pushing the Salmanilla Envelope	Bring Your Own Stereo	re.present	Fail on Cue	2econds	
Vocals/Guitar	Jimi Haha	Jimi Haha	Jimi Haha	Jimi Haha	Jimi Haha	Jimi Haha	
Guitar	Jim McDonough	Jim McDonough	Dave Dowling	Casey Hean	Matt Jones	Island Styles	Bryan Ewald
Bass	Che' Lemon	Che' Lemon	Che' Lemon	Derrick Dorsey	Christian Valiente	Christian Valiente	Christian Valiente
Drums	Jim Chaney	Jim Chaney	Mike Sipple	Kevin Murphy	Jerome Maffeo	Jerome Maffeo	Jerome Maffeo

== Discography ==
=== Studio albums ===
- Pushing the Salmanilla Envelope (1997 - Rocket Records)
- Bring Your Own Stereo (1999 - Island/DefJam)
- Re.present (2004 - Koch)
- Fail on Cue (2008 - Fowl Records)
- 2econds (2022 - Fowl Records)

=== Early Independent albums ===
- Chicken Scratch (1993 - Fowl Records)
- Spit Burger Lottery (1994 - Fowl Records)

=== Live albums ===
- Giving Something Back (1995 - Fowl Records)
- P.T.S.E. Live (2024 - Fowl Records)
- B.Y.O.S. Live (2025 - Fowl Records)

=== Compilation albums ===
- 2 For 1 Special (1995 - Fowl Records) [containing both independent albums Chicken Scratch & Spit Burger Lottery]

=== Extended plays ===
- The Bongjam EP (1998 - Rocket Records)
- Slow Change EP (1999 - Island/DefJam)

=== Singles ===
Year	Song	Peak chart positions		Album
Year	Song	US Main. Rock	US Modern Rock	Album
1996	"High"	10	—	Pushing the Salmanilla Envelope
1997	"Blood"	—	—	Pushing the Salmanilla Envelope
1997	"Another Day"	—	—	Pushing the Salmanilla Envelope
1998	"Dropping Anchor"	33	—	Pushing the Salmanilla Envelope
1999	"Do Right"	—	8	Bring Your Own Stereo
2000	"Trash"	—	—	Bring Your Own Stereo
2004	"Falling Out" (featuring Aaron Lewis of Staind)	—	—	Re.Present
"—" denotes a recording that did not chart or was not released in that territory.
