= Bring Your Own Stereo =

Studio album by Jimmie's Chicken Shack
- Released: August 24, 1999
- Recorded: 1999
- Genres: Alternative rock, alternative metal, post-grunge
- Length: 45:54
- Label: Rocket Records/Island Def Jam
- Producer: Jim Wirt

Jimmie's Chicken Shack chronology
Pushing the Salmanilla Envelope (1997)	Bring Your Own Stereo (1999)	Re.present (2004)

Singles from Bring Your Own Stereo
- 1. "Do Right" Released: 1999; 2. "Trash" Released: 2000

Professional ratings
Review scores
Source	Rating
AllMusic	3.5/5 stars
The Baltimore Sun	2.5/4 stars
The Indianapolis Star	2.5/4 stars

Bring Your Own Stereo is a studio album by Jimmie's Chicken Shack, released in 1999.

It contains the single "Do Right", which peaked at No. 12 on the Billboard Modern Rock Tracks chart. The album peaked at No. 153 on the Billboard 200.

== Production ==
Bring Your Own Stereo is a loose concept album about frontman Jimi Haha's ex-girlfriend. The album was produced by Jim Wirt; it was mixed by Tom Lord-Alge.

== Critical reception ==
The Indianapolis Star called the album "an eclectic mix of slacker rock, ska, tame punk and acoustic pop with faux hip-hop grooves." The Charleston Daily Mail wrote: "Owing as much to '80s New Wave pop as to the band's usual blitz of guitar-heavy, slacker-ska, the Maryland quartet has turned down the crunch and aimed for loftier goals: Songs based on melody rather than guitar riffs."

== Track listing ==
All tracks by Jimi Haha

1. "Spiraling" - 3:45
2. "Lazy Boy Dash" - 3:13
3. "Do Right" - 3:02
4. "String Of Pearls" - 3:55
5. "Ooh" - 3:04
6. "Let's Get Flat" - 3:38
7. "Trash" - 3:08
8. "Fill In The Blank" - 3:20
9. "Face It" - 3:20
10. "Silence Again" - 2:59
11. "Pure" - 4:29
12. "Waiting" - 4:04
13. "30 Days" - 3:57

== Personnel ==
- Greg Calbi – Mastering
- Randy Cole – Photography
- Double D – Fiddle
- Steve Ewing – Background vocals
- Stefanie Fife – Cello
- Jill Greenberg – Photography
- Jimi Haha – Fiddle, Art Direction
- Erin Haley – Project Coordinator
- Femio Hernández – Mixing Assistant
- Donat Kazarinoff – Tambourine, Background vocals, Engineer
- Che Colovita Lemon – Bass
- David Leonard – Mixing
- Chris Lord-Alge – Mixing
- Tom Lord-Alge – Mixing
- Declan Morrell – Project Coordinator
- Novi Novog – Viola
- Justin Risley – Assistant Engineer
- Matt Silva – Mixing Assistant
- Sipple – Snare drum
- P.J. Smith – Tambourine
- Jim Wirt – Producer, Engineer
- Kathleen Wirt – Project Coordinator
- Suzanne Ybarra – Project Coordinator
