= Operation Stand Down =

American non-profit organization

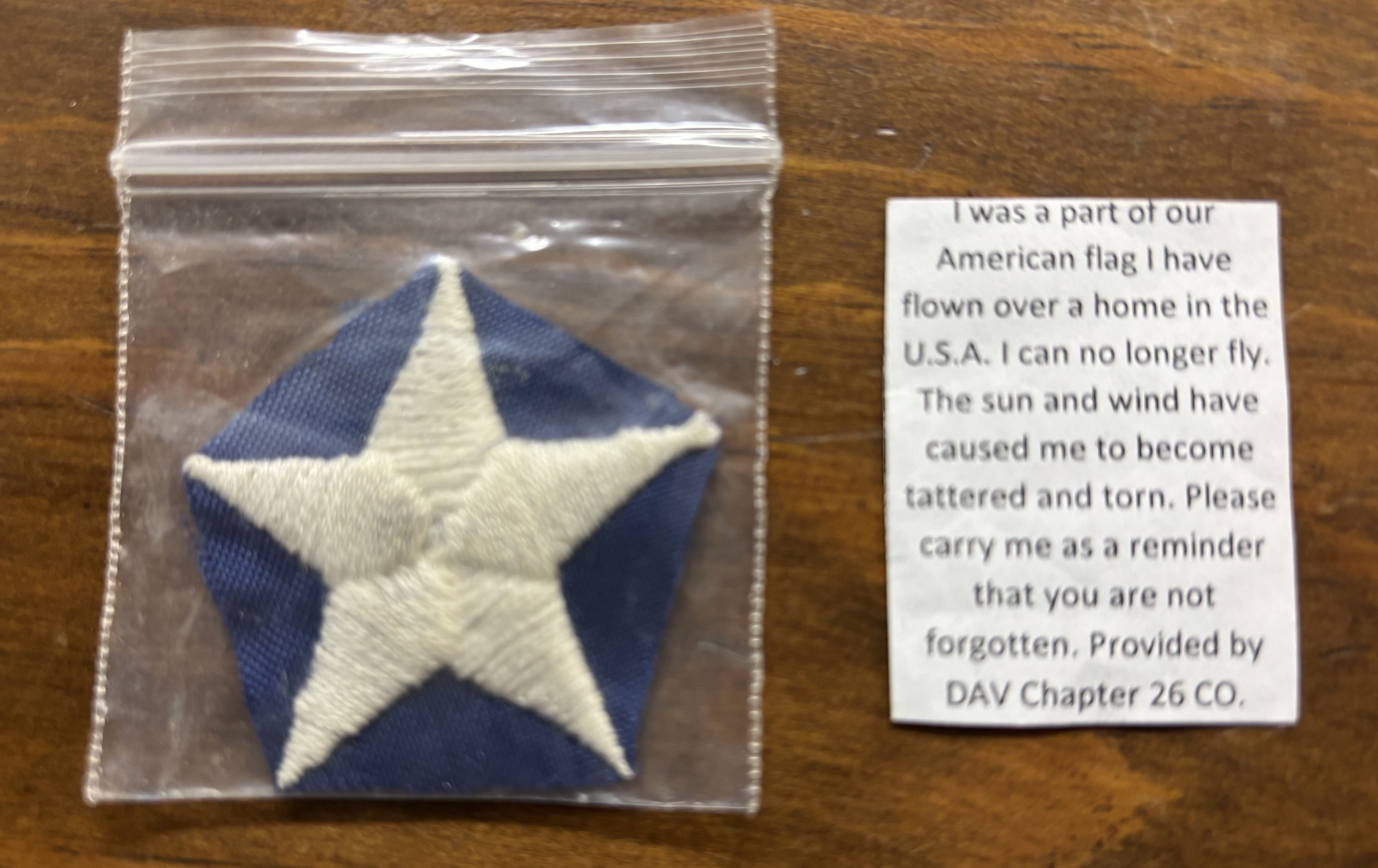
Stars For Our Troops Inc and DAV Star Collaboration Distributed to Homeless Veterans at an Operation Stand Down

Operation Stand Down is a United States non-profit organization providing social services to United States Armed Forces veterans, helping them transition into civilian life. The "Stand Down" concept began in San Diego in 1988, developed by Vietnam veterans Robert Van Keuren and Dr. Jon Nachison with support from Vietnam Veterans of San Diego. Various programs that are provided by Operation Stand Down are Transportation Assistance, Operations commissary, Veterans Affairs (VA) Benefits Assistance, Operation Connect, Career Recon and Transitional Housing Program.

Operation Stand Down Tennessee has been tax-exempt since August 1996.

== Locations ==
It has individually ran organizations across the United States, with one in Nashville, Tennessee, among the most prominent.

=== Rhode Island ===
Operation Stand Down Rhode Island is a statewide independent non-profit organization serving homeless and at-risk Rhode Island veterans through services such as employment, housing, legal assistance, and disability-claims. Operation Stand Down RI Memorial returned to Newport for Memorial Day weekend in 2026. In 2015, Operation Stand Down Rhode Island was the Champions in Action winner, receiving $35,000 in funding from Citizens Bank. In 2016, it launched Boots on the Ground for Heroes Memorial, which has been held annually since 2019 at Fort Adams State Park. In 2026, more than 7,000 boots representing post-9/11 U.S. service members who died in the Global War on Terror were displayed. The Operation Stand Down Rhode Island has renovated a ten-bedroom historic home in Woonsocket as transitional housing for homeless female veterans, which was dedicated in memory of Marine Cpl. Andrea Ryder in 2023.

=== Arkansas ===
Operation Stand Down Arkansas was founded in 2012 by Dr. Daniel Fridh and was designed as a free dental program for veterans.

=== Tennessee ===
Operations Stand Down Tennessee has 3 VA approved locations. In June 2024, Operation Stand Down Tennessee opened a new transitional housing facility in Nashville with the capacity to house 42 veterans (35 men and 7 women). The facility features private bedrooms and bathrooms and was funded through a VA Grant. The Transitional Housing Program (THP) is the only program for female Veterans in the state of Tennessee.

Operation Stand Down Tennessee's revenue for the fiscal year ending December 2024 was $12,532,120, while its expenses amounted to $9,055,085. The organization's total revenue was primarily derived from contributions, which accounted for $9,546,717 (76.2%) of its financial resources.

Since April 2025, its new CEO is Lt. General Jason T. Evens.
