= Pushing the Salmanilla Envelope =

Studio album by Jimmie's Chicken Shack
- Released: June 10, 1997
- Recorded: 1997
- Genre: Alternative rock; funk metal; nu metal
- Length: 45:16
- Label: Rocket
- Producer: Steven Haigler

Jimmie's Chicken Shack chronology
2 For 1 Special (1995)	Pushing the Salmanilla Envelope (1997)	Bring Your Own Stereo (1999)

Singles from Pushing the Salmanilla Envelope
- 1. "High" Released: 1996; 2. "Blood" Released: 1997; 3. "Another Day" Released: 1997; 4. "Dropping Anchor" Released: 1998

Professional ratings
Review scores
Source	Rating
AllMusic	4/5 stars

Pushing the Salmanilla Envelope is an album by the American band Jimmie's Chicken Shack. It was released in 1997. The album sold more than 200,000 copies. The band supported the album by opening for Everclear on a North American tour.

The title is a word play of "Pushing the envelope", salmonella, and manila envelope.

== Critical reception ==
The Washington Post wrote that the band "combines art-rock and hard-rock with a muscular rhythm section that adds a surging, funk-flavored bottom in the vein of the Red Hot Chili Peppers and Living Colour."

== Track listing ==
All tracks by Jimi Haha, Jim McD, Jim Chaney & Che Lemon

1. Dropping Anchor - 3:40
2. Outhouse - 3:20
3. High - 3:48
4. Spiderweb - 4:05
5. Blood - 3:44
6. This Is Not Hell - 5:07
7. Milk - 5:21
8. Hole - 2:21
9. School Bus - 2:55
10. Another Day - 3:24
11. Sitting with the Dog - 4:10
12. When You Die You're Dead - 3:16

== Personnel ==
- Jimi Haha - Guitar/Vocals
- Jim McD - Guitar
- Jim Chaney - Drums and Percussion
- Che Lemon - Bass
