= Webster Theater =

Music venue in the south end of Hartford, Connecticut

Coordinates: 41.7448°N 72.6829°W

The Webster Theater
- The Webster, The Web
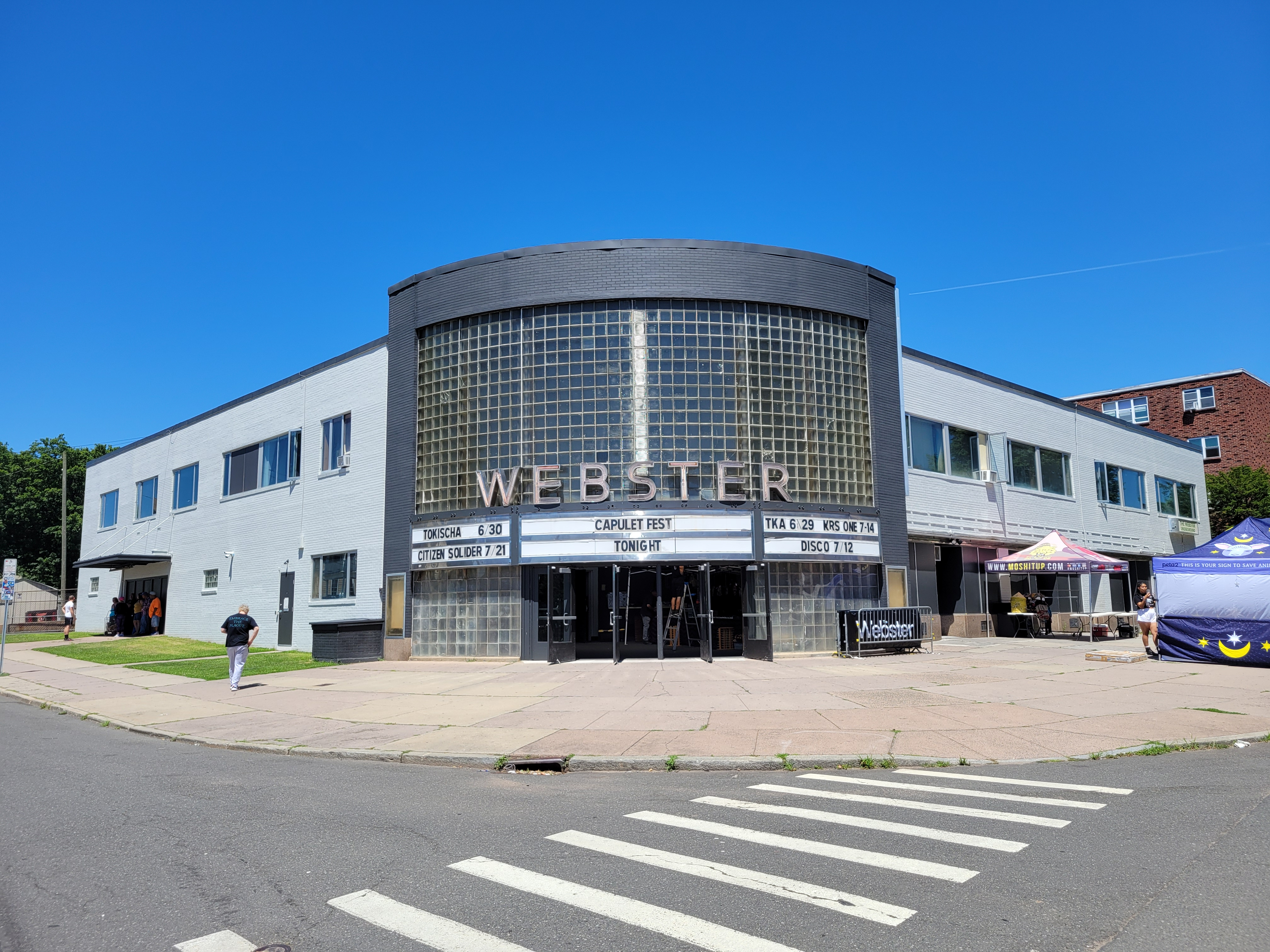
- Webster Theater
- Interactive map of The Webster Theater
- Location: 31 Webster Street; Hartford, Connecticut
- Capacity: 1200
- Type: Music venue

Construction
- Opened: November 19, 1937
- Expanded: 1987

Website
- Official website

The Webster Theater is a music venue in the south end of Hartford, Connecticut. The Webster Underground is an attached smaller venue, which usually acts as a second stage during concerts on the main stage.

== History ==
The Webster opened on November 19, 1937 as a movie theater by the Shulman family. Hartford's mayor, councilmen, and Connecticut state Senators were in attendance for opening night. In the 1930s and 1940s, the theater hosted a weekly "dish night," a common practice for theaters of the time, where patrons would receive free dishes to entice them to the theater. The theater was successful until the advent of the television kept more people in their homes, while the Interstate Highway System brought more people out to the suburbs.

After falling attendance, in 1974 the Shulmans leased the theater to Starship Enterprises who promised to show family films while introducing live music into the theater. They redecorated the main lobby and had sprawling moonscapes painted on the ceilings. However, the family film plan failed to bring sufficient funds to the theater, and new management turned the Webster into a showcase for adult films.

In the fall of 1986 Mr. Shulman saw a chance to revive the theater. Along with the owner of the Warner Theater in Torrington, Shulman invested about $50,000 to restore carpeting, paint, and install a 17' by 34' screen which was, at the time, the largest in the state. The theater featured movies on the second release, and admission was $2 for adults and $.99 for children and senior citizens.

== Modern day ==
In the 2000s, CBS and ClearChannel offered to buy the Webster, but neither was successful. In 1996 No Doubt and Incubus, both virtually unknown artists at the time, opened for well known 311 at the Webster. Today, the theater is primarily a music venue seven days a week, featuring national acts on the Mainstage and mostly local and regional talent on the Underground stage. The venue mainly features hard rock, metal, and hardcore bands these days. In the late 1990s and early to mid 2000s in addition to many hard rock/metal bands (Megadeth, Slipknot, Fear Factory, Deftones, Static-X, Machine Head), the venue welcomed many bands from the "jamband" and improvisational rock scene. Max Creek, Leftover Salmon, Insane Clown Posse, Twiztid, The Slip, Keller Williams, Tim Reynolds, Strangefolk, Chris Robinson's (of Black Crowes fame) band New Earth Mud, Percy Hill, Disco Biscuits, The New Deal, Deep Banana Blackout, Maceo Parker, Vince Welnick (of The Grateful Dead), Robby Krieger (of The Doors) and The Word (feat. John Medeski of Medeski Martin & Wood, Robert Randolph and all three members of The North Mississippi All-Stars) to name a few acts that played in that era. The Webster has begun to take an approach towards the underground rap scene, recently hosting artists like Rich Amiri, Xaviersobased, and Nettspend.
