= Matt Combs =

American musician

Matt Combs is an American studio musician, record producer, composer, arranger, and author in Nashville, Tennessee.

== Early life ==
Growing up in Wichita, Kansas, his musical life began after seeing a performance by violinist Itzhak Perlman. He studied the Suzuki method of violin playing and also began playing old- time jazz and pop tunes with his father and brothers in the Combs Family Band. This two-pronged approach to the instrument continued throughout his youth, as he continued classical study while also playing improvised music in bands throughout Wichita. He was accepted into the School of Music at the University of Michigan to study with pedagogue Paul Kantor to embark on a degree in classical violin performance. Matt spent the summer prior to his first year at the Aspen Music Festival, and there he met a group of musicians who introduced him to an array of music that broadened his approach to the violin. He completed a degree in classical performance at the University of Michigan, but during his time there his love for fiddle music became a driver for his post-college plans.

== Career ==
After winning the 1996 Rockygrass Fiddle Championship in Lyons, Colorado, Combs graduated from college, rented a U-Haul and drove straight to Nashville and the bluegrass club The Station Inn. There he met and became part of a large network of fiddlers. Combs soon met and became close friends and colleagues with John Hartford. He began playing mandolin occasionally in the John Hartford String Band, and when Hartford lost the use of his hands due to cancer treatment, Combs joined the band full-time playing fiddle. Combs participated in the reunited John Hartford Band's Grammy-nominated "Memories of John" record that commemorated Hartford and his music on the 10th anniversary of his death. After Hartford's death, Combs worked Katie Hartford Hogue and Greg Reish to author John Hartford's Mammoth Collection of Fiddle Tunes. This anthology contains 176 of John's original fiddle tunes, most of which were previously unpublished and unrecorded that were taken from Hartford's personal music journals. Along with tunes, the book also features Hartford's reflections on the fiddle, his creative process, and interviews with musicians who worked with Hartford. Combs has been a member of the Grand Ole Opry house band, Mike Snider’s String Band and the Nashville Mandolin Ensemble, and has performed with Reba McEntire, Jerry Douglas, Patty Loveless, Marty Stuart, Alison Brown, and Ray Price. He also helped produce "Pa's Fiddle", a recording of the music said to have been played by Pa Ingalls from the books of Laura Ingalls Wilder.

Combs works regularly with Dan Auerbach of the Black Keys as a member of his Easy Eye Studio house band, and arranged and recorded strings for Social Cues, the 2019 Cage the Elephant release on RCA Records. Combs appeared in three seasons of ABC’s hit show "Nashville", both on-screen as a musician in the band of Hayden Panettiere's "Juliette Barnes," and behind-the-scenes on the show's soundtrack, produced by Buddy Miller. His original music has been heard in Kevin Costner's Hatfields and McCoys miniseries, and he recorded fiddle parts for the 2016 remake of Roots. His collaboration with David "Fergie" Ferguson and Matt Sweeney appeared in Red Dead Redemption 2, the video game from Rockstar Games.

== Composer ==
Combs is also a composer of new classical music. Appalachian Rhapsody was written in 2015, and is an orchestral work featuring the fiddle and piano. Co-written with Nate Strasser, Appalachian Rhapsody has been performed by the Wheeling Symphony and The Nashville Concerto Orchestra. This piece is a cinematic look at the history of the fiddle in the United States though the original music presented by Combs and Strasser.

== Educator ==
As an educator, Combs directs the fiddle program at Vanderbilt University’s Blair School of Music and lectures regularly on the history of country music and Music City including multiple lectures as keynote speaker for the Fulbright Scholars in Nashville. In addition to his work at the Blair School of Music, Combs partners with Nashville Symphony and the Country Music Hall of Fame to develop an outreach program called "Is it a Fiddle or Violin?"
