= Aaron Lewis =

American rock musician (born 1972)

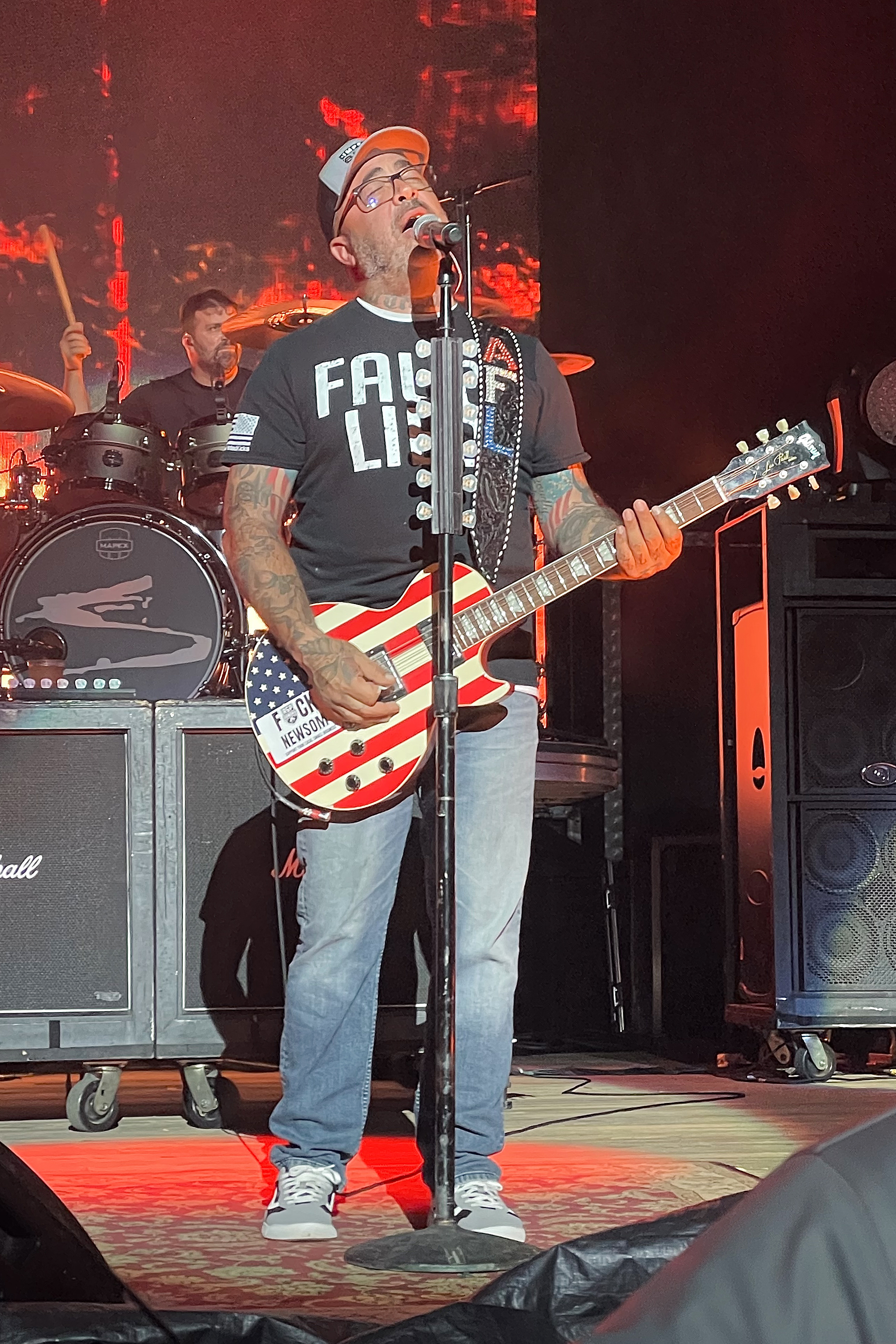
- Lewis performing with Staind in 2021

Background information
- Born: April 13, 1972 (age 54); Rutland, Vermont, U.S.
- Origin: Massachusetts, U.S.
- Genres: Alternative metal; post-grunge; nu metal; country rock; alternative country
- Occupations: Singer; musician; songwriter
- Instruments: Vocals; guitar
- Years active: 1990–present
- Labels: Stroudavarious/R&J; Blaster; Dot; Valory/Big Machine
- Member of: Staind
- Website: aaronlewismusic.com

Aaron Lewis (born April 13, 1972) is an American musician and founding member of the rock band Staind, with whom he has since released eight studio albums. Since 2010, he has pursued a solo career in country music with his debut EP, Town Line, which was released in 2011. Lewis's first full-length solo release, The Road, was released by Blaster Records in 2012.

In 2006, Lewis was ranked at number 49 in the "Top 100 Heavy Metal Vocalists" by Hit Parader.

== Early life ==
Lewis was born in Rutland, Vermont, to a Jewish mother and a Catholic father of Italian, English, and Welsh descent. At the time of his birth on April 13, 1972, his parents were living in a log cabin. Lewis moved to New Hampshire when he was 8, and lived there until he was 12. When his parents split up, he moved with his father to Longmeadow, Massachusetts, where he attended Longmeadow High School. He also lived in Forest Park, Springfield, Massachusetts.

== Career ==
=== Staind ===
Aaron Lewis is the founding lead vocalist and rhythm guitarist for the rock band Staind, a role he has held since the band's formation in Springfield, Massachusetts, in 1995. His work with the group is defined by his distinctive "screaming" and melodic vocal style, which became a staple of the nu metal and post-grunge eras.

Lewis helped form Staind in 1995. The band gained significant attention after being discovered by Limp Bizkit's Fred Durst.

He is preparing to release his ninth studio album with the band, some highlights from previous years include the 7× platinum Break the Cycle (2001) and their most recent release, Confessions of the Fallen (2023). The Space between the Darkness and the Light is set to release in March of 2027.

Lewis with Staind is the voice behind some of the most played songs in modern rock radio history, most notably "It's Been Awhile", which spent 20 weeks at number one on the rock charts.

He is the primary songwriter for the band, often writing hits like "Outside" and "It's Been Awhile" years before their official release.

=== Solo career ===
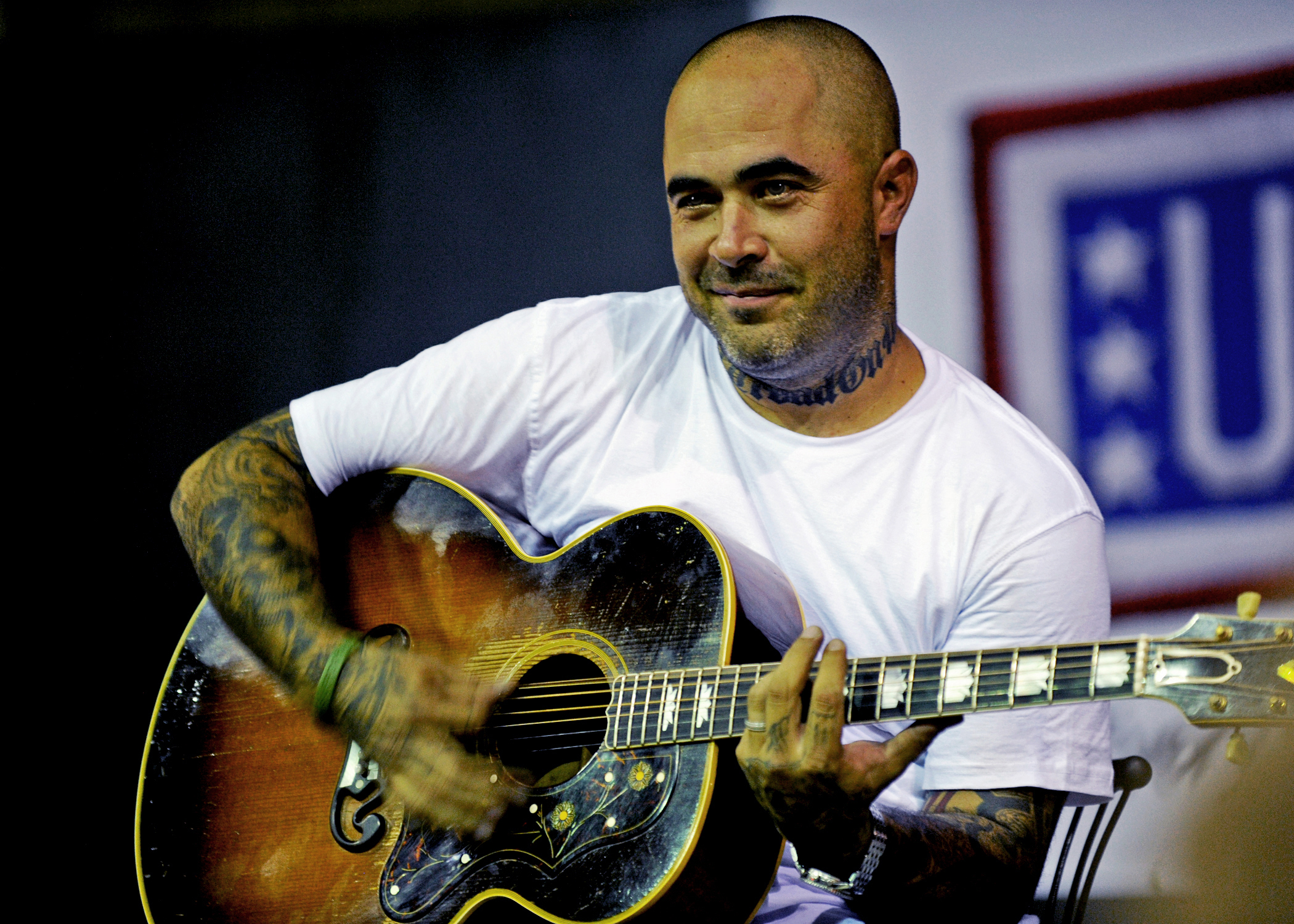
Lewis performing for U.S. troops during a United Service Organizations tour at an undisclosed base in Southwest Asia in September 2010

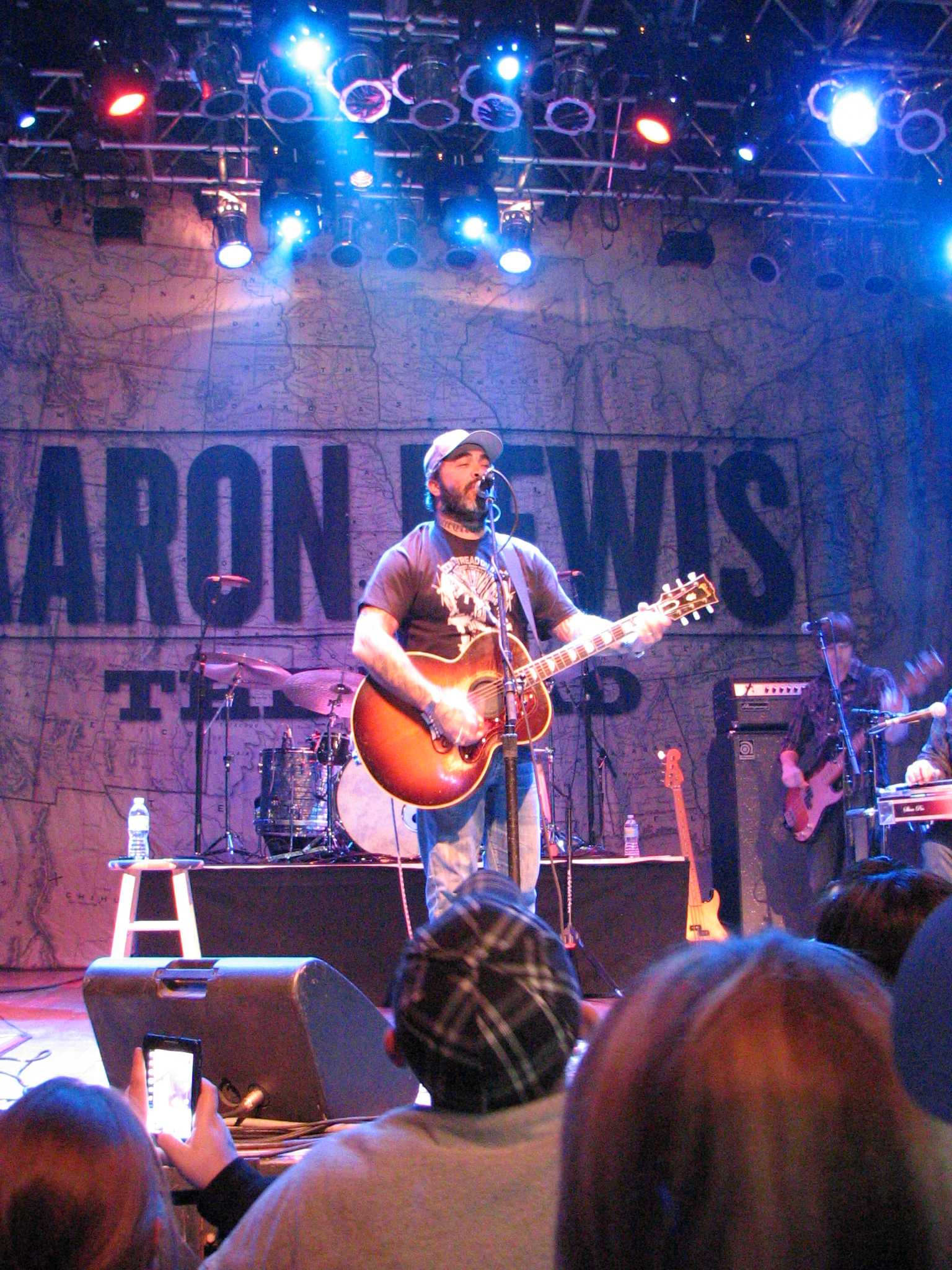
Lewis performing at the House of Blues in Cleveland in 2013

In July 2010, Lewis finished recording a country music EP entitled Town Line that was released on March 1, 2011, via Stroudavarious Records. It features seven tracks including three versions of the first single "Country Boy" featuring George Jones, Charlie Daniels, and Chris Young, as well as the songs "Massachusetts", "Vicious Circles", "The Story Never Ends", and a re-recording of "Tangled Up in You" originally from The Illusion of Progress. Lewis said in a July 2011 interview that he was introduced to country music as a child by his grandfather, but his interest was recently rekindled when he toured with fellow rock turned occasional country singer Kid Rock.

Lewis released his first full solo album, The Road, in November 2012. Its debut single, "Endless Summer", has also made the country charts. Lewis wrote every song on the ten track collection, except for "Granddaddy's Gun" which was penned by Dallas Davidson, Rhett Akins and Bobby Pinson, marking the first time Lewis has recorded outside material for an album. In an interview with Broadway's Electric Barnyard, Lewis said he recorded "Granddaddy's Gun" as both a compliment to a friend, and because he was pressed for time.

Lewis wrote songs for his second solo album while touring in support of The Road, often performing with Katz Von Brunenburg in his live sets. The album, dubbed Sinner, was mostly recorded in a single 18 hour session, with many tracks done in one take. Aaron's daughter Zoe also provides guest vocals on one song.

On April 12, 2019, Lewis released his third solo album, State I'm In.

On July 4, 2021, he released "Am I the Only One", a song protesting America's leadership and left-wing activists during Biden's term in office.

On October 21, 2021, Lewis released "Goodbye Town" and also announced that he would release his fourth solo album Frayed at Both Ends on January 28, 2022, in which he sings about the struggles of working-class adulthood, personal resilience, and conservative frustration.

On March 29, 2024, Lewis released his country album, The Hill, with the message of unapologetic personal conviction, aging with resolve, and traditional conservatism amid a changing world.

On July 17, 2026, Lewis released his next country album, Give my Country Back. In the album, Lewis sang about losing friends over politics, socialism and patriotism for the US.

=== Collaborations ===
Lewis was featured on the song "No Sex" by Limp Bizkit on their album Significant Other. He was also featured on a remix of the song "Crawling" on Linkin Park's first remix album Reanimation (titled as "Krwlng" on the remix album). He contributed vocals to the song "Follow" by Sevendust from Animosity, and to the songs "Bleed" and "Send in the Clowns" by the band Cold from 13 Ways to Bleed on Stage. He's also featured on Jimmie's Chicken Shack's song "Falling Out", the only single off their 2004 album re.present. In December 2010, while promoting his Town Line album, Lewis collaborated with Corey Taylor for a one-night-only acoustic duet show covering songs such as Pearl Jam's "Black", Pink Floyd's "Comfortably Numb", and Alice in Chains' "Down in a Hole".

== Personal life ==
Lewis had previously resided in Worthington, Massachusetts, with his wife Vanessa, whom he married in 2002; they have three daughters. They now live in TN to be closer to Nashville while he furthers his solo country career.

Regarding the commercial success of Staind's albums in the early 2000s, Lewis reflected, "A lot of other people made a shit load of money but we're the same as any of you. I have to work to pay my bills."

Lewis has been open about his dysfunctional upbringing and struggles with mental health issues though he's stated that he never had any serious addictions to hard drugs, writing about his problems in Staind songs and his country music.

In a five-minute interview with Outdoor Life magazine, Lewis said that he has been hunting whitetail deer since he was old enough to keep up in the "good old woods", around age four or five. He prefers to hunt deer with a compound or recurve bow, and he occasionally utilizes a muzzleloader. Lewis is a fan of the Boston Red Sox and New England Patriots. He is an avid baseball fan; he famously sang the national anthem before game 5 of the 2014 World Series, though received backlash due to him forgetting the words. He had previously criticized pop singer Christina Aguilera for the same offense.

On November 4, 2006, Lewis performed at his old high school in Longmeadow, Massachusetts, and gave all the proceeds to the music department to fund the department's expenses to buy new equipment and supplies. Lewis's main focus, however, is the non-profit organization It Takes a Community, where he and his wife have started to reopen their daughters' elementary school in Worthington, Massachusetts.

Lewis is a vocal supporter of the Republican Party, known for expressing his conservative views often; Lewis supported Donald Trump before the 2016 election, although he said he was disappointed with his "bickering and name-calling". His tours from 2019 and 2020 featured him wearing a Make America Great Again cap. Lewis has been outspoken in his opposition to the COVID-19 vaccine and mask mandates.

Lewis is a Christian.

== Discography ==
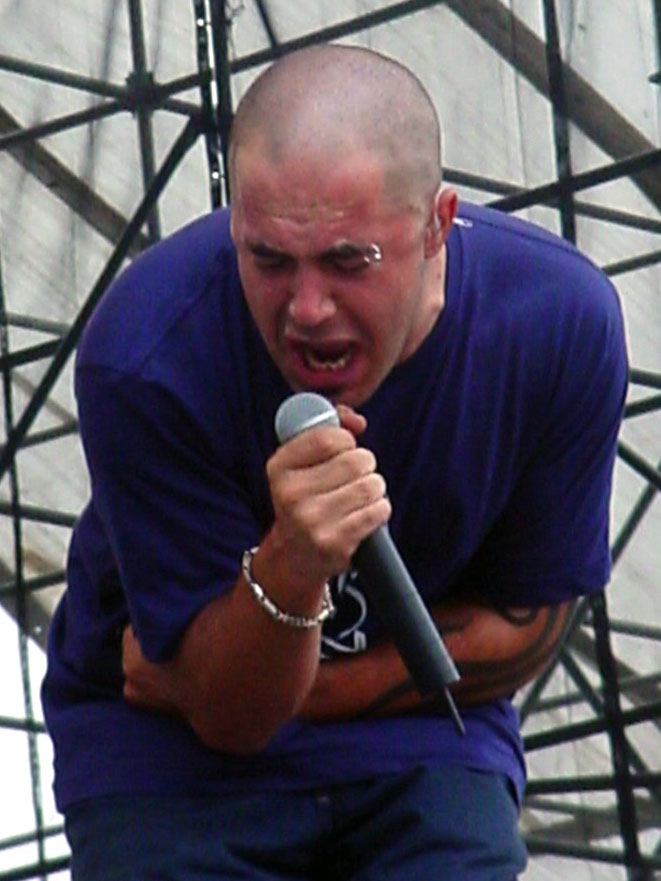
Lewis performing with Staind in 2001

Lewis performing with Staind in 2025

=== Studio albums ===
List of studio albums, with selected chart positions
Title	Album details	Peak chart positions		Sales
Title	Album details	US	US Country	Sales
The Road	Released: November 13, 2012; Label: Blaster; Formats: CD, digital download	30	7	US: 220,000
Sinner	Released: September 16, 2016; Label: Dot Records; Formats: CD, digital download, vinyl	4	1	US: 146,800 Canadian Albums (Billboard) 36
State I'm In	Released: April 12, 2019; Label: Big Machine; Formats: CD, digital download, vinyl	18	2	US: 41,600
Frayed at Both Ends	Released: January 28, 2022; Label: Big Machine; Formats: CD, LP, digital download, streaming	39	5	
The Hill	Released: March 29, 2024; Label: Big Machine; Formats: CD, LP, digital download, streaming	175	33	
"—" denotes a recording that did not chart or was not released in that territory.

- Give My Country Back (2026) US Top Album Sales (Billboard) #27

=== Extended plays ===
List of extended plays, with selected chart positions
Title	Extended play details	Peak chart positions		
Title	Extended play details	US	US Country	US Rock
Town Line	Released: March 1, 2011; Label: Stroudavarious; Formats: CD, digital download	7	1	3

=== Singles ===
List of singles, with selected chart positions and certifications, showing year released and album name
Title	Year	Peak chart positions								Certifications	Album
Title	Year	US	US Adult	US Alt.	US Country	US Country Airplay	US Heri. Rock	US Main. Rock	US Rock	Certifications	Album
"Outside" (with Fred Durst)	2000	56	31	2	—		—	1	—		The Family Values Tour 1999
"Country Boy" (featuring George Jones and Charlie Daniels)	2011	87	—	—	50		20	23	39	RIAA: Platinum	Town Line
"Endless Summer"	2012	—	—	—	39		—	—	—		The Road
"Forever"	2012	—	—	—	50	38	—	—	—		The Road
"Granddaddy's Gun"	2013	—	—	—	—	46	—	—	—		The Road
"That Ain't Country"	2016	—	—	—	—	—	—	—	—		Sinner
"Am I the Only One"	2021	14	—	—	1	52	—	—	—	RIAA: Gold	Frayed at Both Ends
"Let's Go Fishing"	2024	—	—	—	—	—	—	—	—		The Hill
"Made In China"	2024	—	—	—	—	—	—	—	—		The Hill
"Over the Hill"	2024	—	—	—	—	—	—	—	—		The Hill
"—" denotes a recording that did not chart or was not released in that territory.

=== Music videos ===
List of music videos, showing year released and director
Title	Year	Director(s)
"Country Boy" (version 1) (featuring George Jones and Charlie Daniels)	2010	Alex Castino
"Country Boy" (version 2) (featuring George Jones and Charlie Daniels)	2011	—N/a
"Endless Summer" (live)	2012	Jim Wright
"Endless Summer"	2012	Jim Wright
"Forever" (live)	2012	Fran Strine
"Forever"	2012	Jim Wright
"Granddaddy's Gun"	2013	Jim Wright
"That Ain't Country"	2016	Jim Wright

== Awards and nominations ==
Year	Association	Category	Result
2011	CMT Music Awards	USA Weekend Breakthrough Video of the Year – "Country Boy"	Nominated
2011	CMT Music Awards	Collaborative Video of the Year – "Country Boy" (with George Jones and Charlie Daniels)	Nominated
