= New Old Songs =

- Cover art by Wes Borland

Remix album by Limp Bizkit
- Released: December 4, 2001
- Recorded: 2001
- Genre: Hip hop
- Length: 73:51
- Label: Flip; Interscope
- Producer: The Neptunes; Timbaland; DJ Lethal; P. Diddy; Bosko; DJ Premier; Fred Durst; Josh Abraham; Butch Vig; DJ Monk; The Track Mack; William Orbit; The Dub Pistols

Limp Bizkit chronology
Chocolate Starfish and the Hot Dog Flavored Water (2000)	New Old Songs (2001)	Results May Vary (2003)

New Old Songs is the only remix album by American nu metal band Limp Bizkit. Released on December 4, 2001, the album contains hip hop remixes of songs from the band's first three studio albums Three Dollar Bill, Y'all (1997), Significant Other (1999), and Chocolate Starfish and the Hot Dog Flavored Water (2000). It is also the sixteenth best-selling remix album of all time.

== Music and lyrics ==
The sound of New Old Songs is predominantly based in hip hop music, in particular rap infused with rock music styles and culture. The album compiles remixes of songs from Three Dollar Bill, Y'all, Significant Other and Chocolate Starfish and the Hot Dog Flavored Water. This album's remix of "Faith", a cover of the George Michael song, incorporates elements of David Bowie's song "Fame" and a newly recorded rap verse by Everlast.

== Critical reception ==
Professional ratings
Review scores
Source	Rating
AllMusic	2/5 stars
NME	3/5 stars
The Rolling Stone Album Guide	2/5 stars
Martin Charles Strong	5/10

Despite having no singles released, it achieved Gold certification by the RIAA in February 2002 in the US. The album peaked at #26 on the Billboard 200. AllMusic writer Bradley Torreano panned the album, writing "Most of these songs could have even survived the remix if the choruses, which are an important part of the Bizkit formula, retained their massive riffing and awesome production." Torreano appraised three of the album's tracks: Fred Durst and Josh Abraham's remix of "Faith", DJ Premier's remix of "My Way" and Butch Vig's "Nookie" remix. Describing Vig's "Nookie" remix, Torreano said that it might be the album's best track, writing that it "sounds more like Fatboy Slim with its thick beat and dirty keyboard". The Rolling Stone Album Guide awarded the album two out of five stars. In The Essential Rock Discography, Martin Charles Strong gave the compilation a 5 out of 10 rating.

== Track listing ==
No.	Title	Music	Producer(s)	Length
1.	"Nookie - For the Nookie" (Remixed by The Neptunes)	remixed from Significant Other	The Neptunes	3:55
2.	"Take a Look Around" (Remixed by Timbaland (Featuring E-40 and 8-Ball))	remixed from Chocolate Starfish and the Hot Dog Flavored Water	Timbaland	4:54
3.	"Break Stuff" (Remixed by DJ Lethal)	remixed from Significant Other	DJ Lethal	3:33
4.	"My Way - The P. Diddy Remix" (Remixed by Sean "P. Diddy" Combs)	remixed from Chocolate Starfish and the Hot Dog Flavored Water	P. Diddy	4:23
5.	"Crushed" (Remixed by Bosko (Featuring Bosko))	remixed from End of Days soundtrack	Bosko	4:03
6.	"N 2 Gether Now - All in Together Now" (Remixed by The Neptunes (Featuring Method Man))	remixed from Significant Other	The Neptunes	4:05
7.	"Rearranged" (Remixed by Timbaland (Featuring Bubba Sparxxx))	remixed from Significant Other	Timbaland	4:56
8.	"Getcha Groove On - Dirt Road Mix" (Remixed by DJ Premier (Featuring Xzibit))	remixed from Chocolate Starfish and the Hot Dog Flavored Water	DJ Premier	4:19
9.	"Faith/Fame Remix" (Remixed by Fred Durst & Josh Abraham (Featuring Everlast))	remixed from Three Dollar Bill, Y'all	Fred Durst, Josh Abraham	3:32
10.	"My Way" (Remixed by DJ Lethal)	remixed from Chocolate Starfish and the Hot Dog Flavored Water	DJ Lethal	4:28
11.	"Nookie - Androids vs. Las Putas Remix" (Remixed by Butch Vig)	remixed from Significant Other	Butch Vig	4:06
12.	"Counterfeit - Lethal Dose Extreme Guitar Mix" (Remixed by DJ Lethal)	remixed from Three Dollar Bill, Y'all	DJ Lethal	3:20
13.	"Rollin' - DJ Monk-vs-The Track Mack Remix" (Remixed by DJ Monk-vs-The Track Mack)	remixed from Chocolate Starfish and the Hot Dog Flavored Water	DJ Monk, The Track Mack	6:42
14.	"My Way - DJ Premier Way Remix" (Remixed by DJ Premier)	remixed from Chocolate Starfish and the Hot Dog Flavored Water	DJ Premier	4:37
15.	"My Way - William Orbit's Mix" (Remixed by William Orbit)	remixed from Chocolate Starfish and the Hot Dog Flavored Water	William Orbit	6:33
16.	"My Way - Pistols' Dancehall Dub" (Remixed by The Dub Pistols)	remixed from Chocolate Starfish and the Hot Dog Flavored Water	The Dub Pistols	6:24
Total length:				73:51

== Charts ==
=== Weekly charts ===
Weekly chart performance for New Old Songs
Chart (2001–2002)	Peak position
Australian Albums (ARIA)	54
Austrian Albums (Ö3 Austria)	12
Belgian Albums (Ultratop Flanders)	40
Canadian Albums (Billboard)	24
Dutch Albums (Album Top 100)	55
Finnish Albums (Suomen virallinen lista)	22
French Albums (SNEP)	146
German Albums (Offizielle Top 100)	10
Hungarian Albums (MAHASZ)	15
Irish Albums (IRMA)	52
Italian Albums (FIMI)	49
New Zealand Albums (RMNZ)	19
Scottish Albums (Official Charts)	71
Swiss Albums (Schweizer Hitparade)	32
UK Albums (Official Charts)	76
US Billboard 200	26

=== Year-end charts ===
Year-end chart performance for New Old Songs
Chart (2002)	Position
Canadian Alternative Albums (Nielsen SoundScan)	105
Canadian Metal Albums (Nielsen SoundScan)	49
US Billboard 200	145

== Certifications ==
Certifications and sales for New Old Songs
Region	Certification	Certified units/sales
United Kingdom (BPI)	Gold	100,000^{‡}
United States (RIAA)	Gold	500,000^{^}
^{^} Shipments figures based on certification alone.^{‡} Sales+streaming figures based on certification alone.
