= Dirty Water (disambiguation) =

"Dirty Water" is a 1966 single by The Standells.

Dirty Water may also refer to:

- Dirty Water (album), a 1966 album by The Standells
- "Dirty Water" a song performed by contestants from reality show, The Debut: Dream Academy
- "Dirty Water" (The Blackeyed Susans song), a 1994 single by The Blackeyed Susans
- "Dirty Water", a song by Foo Fighters on the 2017 album Concrete And Gold
- "Dirty Water", a song by Low Cut Connie from the 2017 album Dirty Pictures (Part 1)
- "Dirty Water", a 2000 single by Made in London
- "Dirty Water", a 1987 single by Rock & Hyde
- "Dirty Water", a song by Status Quo from the 1977 album Rockin' All Over the World
- "Dirty Water", a song by The Smith Street Band from the 2020 album Don't Waste Your Anger
- "Dirty Water", a song by Baxter Dury from the 2005 album Floor Show
- Dirty Water Club, a London garage rock nightclub
- 'Dirty water', a seasoned hot dog water utilized by New York City hot dog vendors

== See also ==
- Blackwater (waste)
- Gray water
