= DFP =

DFP may stand for:

- Dominica Freedom Party
- Data Facility Product, an IBM program product for MVS, and later a component of Data Facility Storage Management Subsystem for MVS
- Davidon-Fletcher-Powell formula in mathematical optimization
- Decimal floating point
- Defensive fighting position, a military term
- Department of Finance and Personnel
- VESA Digital Flat Panel
- Diisopropylfluorophosphate
- Doriot, Flandrin & Parant, a French car manufactur
- Downstream-facing port, sends data downstream
- Dysfunctional Family Picnic, a series of US rock concerts
- DoubleClick for Publishers, merged into Google Ad Manager
