= Boiler (song) =

2001 single by Limp Bizkit

Single by Limp Bizkit

from the album Chocolate Starfish and the Hot Dog Flavored Water
- Released: July 10, 2001
- Length: 5:47 (single version); 7:00 (album version)
- Label: Flip; Interscope
- Composers: Wes Borland; Sam Rivers; John Otto
- Lyricist: Fred Durst
- Producers: Terry Date; Limp Bizkit

Limp Bizkit singles chronology
"My Way" (2001)	"Boiler" (2001)	"Eat You Alive" (2003)

Music video
- "Boiler" on YouTube

"Boiler" is a song by the American nu metal band Limp Bizkit. It was released on July 10, 2001, as the fifth and final single from their third studio album, Chocolate Starfish and the Hot Dog Flavored Water (2000). Guitar World described the song as "an old-school, L.L. Cool J.-style rap ballad".

The song peaked at No. 30 on the US Billboard's Mainstream Rock Tracks chart. It also charted in several other countries, including Portugal, where it peaked at number two. There was a limited-edition gold numbered version of this single that includes DVD music videos from the band. The music video was directed by David Meyers and Fred Durst and was filmed in Portugal.

== Reception ==
In 2022, Louder Sound and Kerrang ranked the song number four and number seven, respectively, on their lists of Limp Bizkit's greatest songs.

== Music video ==
The video begins by panning down a long hallway being vacuumed by one person but is otherwise deserted before entering a room in the building in which both doors are open. In the room the video shows a woman in a bikini in an apartment looking in the mirror with Fred Durst watching her. Then she turns around and opens her mouth and spits out a mechanical arm holding a levitating bomb that is aimed in Durst's direction, causing Durst to jump out of the window and then blows up the whole apartment. Durst then goes to a burger stand called Bolacha Mole (which is Portuguese for Limp Biscuit), where he sits next to a person with a scar under his eye, across from Wes Borland, whose head falls off. Durst starts to eat his burger, but discovers that it is crawling with worms. After this, a car crashes into the stand and it explodes. This section was filmed in the Praça de São Paulo, in downtown Lisbon, Portugal.

Durst wakes up in a bed with a woman who starts to kiss him, and then he pulls off the wig that she was wearing to discover that she has plugs all over her shaved head. Looking around, he discovers that there were dozens of couples kissing and having sex in similar beds. Prompted by this revelation, he starts to run away. While running, Durst turns into a cartoon and is chased by an army of humans with round bellies, and a sea of hot dogs (all resembling the Chocolate Starfish album's cover art) which turns into a giant sea monster that tries to kill him. After escaping, he changes back into his real form by ripping the cartoon character apart to reveal himself again and jumps onto a stage with the rest of the band. After the band finishes performing the song, Durst drops his hat on the ground and walks away.

This was the final music video to feature guitarist Wes Borland due to him leaving the band in October of that same year (Borland has since returned). The video was banned from MTV due to the scene where couples are having sex and the scene where Wes Borland's head falls off.

== Track listing ==
1. "Boiler"
2. "Faith"
3. "My Way" (DJ Premier remix)
4. "My Way" (P. Diddy remix)
5. "Boiler" (video)

== Charts ==
Chart (2001–2002)	Peak position
Austria (Ö3 Austria Top 40)	44
Germany (GfK)	50
Ireland (IRMA)	24
Netherlands (Dutch Top 40 Tipparade)	3
Netherlands (Single Top 100)	68
Portugal (AFP)	2
Scotland Singles (OCC)	14
Switzerland (Schweizer Hitparade)	57
UK Singles (OCC)	18
UK Rock & Metal (OCC)	2
US Mainstream Rock (Billboard)	30

== Release history ==
Region	Date	Format(s)	Label(s)	Ref.
United States	July 10, 2001	Mainstream rock; active rock; alternative radio	Flip; Interscope	
United Kingdom	October 29, 2001	CD	Flip; Interscope	
Japan	December 19, 2001	CD	Flip; Interscope	
