= My Generation (Limp Bizkit song) =

2000 single by Limp Bizkit

Single by Limp Bizkit

from the album Chocolate Starfish and the Hot Dog Flavored Water
- Released: September 5, 2000
- Genre: Nu metal; rap metal
- Length: 3:43
- Label: Flip; Interscope
- Composers: Wes Borland; Sam Rivers; John Otto
- Lyricist: Fred Durst
- Producers: Terry Date; Limp Bizkit

Limp Bizkit singles chronology
"Take a Look Around" (2000)	"My Generation" (2000)	"Rollin (Air Raid Vehicle)" (2000)

Music video
- "My Generation" on YouTube

"My Generation" is a song by the American nu metal band Limp Bizkit from their third studio album, Chocolate Starfish and the Hot Dog Flavored Water (2000). It was released as the second and third single simultaneously, along with "Rollin'", on September 5, 2000.

== Content ==
It contains lyrical references to the songs "My Generation" by the Who, "Welcome to the Jungle" by Guns N' Roses and "Move Over" by the Spice Girls. Musically, the song displays the interplay between guitarist Wes Borland and drummer John Otto as the two's musical parts are tightly intertwined in a similar way to how the bass and drums intertwine in Primus, who have influenced Limp Bizkit and toured with them.

== Music video ==
The music video for "My Generation" shows Limp Bizkit performing live on an acrylic glass stage, while other scenes show their fans being rebellious outside the Astrodome. During the breakdown of the song, each band member is shown separately, disappearing and reappearing.

Professional wrestler Travis Tomko, who worked as a bodyguard for the band at the time, makes an appearance in the video pulling Fred Durst out of the crowd.

== Reception and legacy ==
In 2022, Louder Sound and Kerrang ranked the song number three and number two, respectively, on their lists of Limp Bizkit's greatest songs.

Fred Durst's vocals from the song were sampled on the Babymetal track "Onedari Daisakusen", which appeared on their 2014 self-titled album. The overall instrumentation of "Onedari Daisakusen" was also inspired by Limp Bizkit.

== Track listing ==
It was released as two different singles (parts) with slightly different covers.

CD2:

1. "My Generation" (Radio Edit)
2. "It's Like That Y'All" (Non-LP Version)
3. "Snake in Your Face" (Non-LP Version)

CD1:

1. "My Generation" (Album Version)
2. "Back o Da Bus" (Non-LP Version)
3. "Faith" (LP Version)

== Charts ==
=== Weekly charts ===
Chart (2000–2001)	Peak position
Australia (ARIA)	31
Austria (Ö3 Austria Top 40)	19
Belgium (Ultratop 50 Flanders)	23
Belgium (Ultratip Bubbling Under Wallonia)	8
Canada (Billboard)	64
Denmark (Tracklisten)	13
Finland (Suomen virallinen lista)	5
France (SNEP)	9
Germany (GfK)	23
Ireland (IRMA)	25
Italy (FIMI)	11
Netherlands (Single Top 100)	14
Norway (VG-lista)	16
Scotland Singles (OCC)	12
Spain (Promusicae)	15
Sweden (Sverigetopplistan)	31
Switzerland (Schweizer Hitparade)	23
UK Singles (OCC)	15
UK Rock & Metal (OCC)	1
US Alternative Airplay (Billboard)	18
US Mainstream Rock (Billboard)	33

=== Year-end charts ===
Chart (2000)	Position
US Modern Rock Tracks (Billboard)	94

== Certifications ==
Region	Certification	Certified units/sales
New Zealand (RMNZ)	Platinum	30,000^{‡}
United Kingdom (BPI)	Silver	200,000^{‡}
^{‡} Sales+streaming figures based on certification alone.

== Release history ==
Region	Date	Format(s)	Label(s)	Ref.
United States	September 5, 2000	Mainstream rock; active rock; alternative radio	Flip; Interscope	
United Kingdom	October 30, 2000	7-inch vinyl; CD	Flip; Interscope	
Japan	February 21, 2001	CD	Flip; Interscope	
