= Chocolate Starfish and the Hot Dog Flavored Water =

2000 studio album by Limp Bizkit

Studio album by Limp Bizkit
- Released: October 17, 2000
- Recorded: January–August 2000
- Studios: NRG Studios (Hollywood); Westlake Audio (Hollywood); Larrabee (Hollywood); Studio Litho (Seattle); Long View Farm Studios (Brookfield, Massachusetts); The Hit Factory (New York); Olympic Studios (London); South Beach Studios (Miami)
- Genres: Nu metal; rap metal
- Length: 75:02
- Labels: Flip; Interscope
- Producers: Terry Date; Limp Bizkit; Swizz Beatz

Limp Bizkit chronology
Significant Other (1999)	Chocolate Starfish and the Hot Dog Flavored Water (2000)	New Old Songs (2001)

Limp Bizkit studio album chronology
Significant Other (1999)	Chocolate Starfish and the Hot Dog Flavored Water (2000)	Results May Vary (2003)

Singles from Chocolate Starfish and the Hot Dog Flavored Water
- 1. "Take a Look Around" Released: July 18, 2000; 2. "My Generation" Released: September 5, 2000; 3. "Rollin' (Air Raid Vehicle)" Released: September 5, 2000; 4. "My Way" Released: January 6, 2001; 5. "Boiler" Released: July 10, 2001

Chocolate Starfish and the Hot Dog Flavored Water is the third studio album by American nu metal band Limp Bizkit. It was released on October 17, 2000, through Flip and Interscope Records. The album saw the band capitalize on newfound mainstream attention following the success of their previous album, Significant Other (1999).

The album debuted at No. 1 on the Billboard 200 chart in the United States, selling 1,054,511 copies in its first week and setting a record for the fastest-selling rock album in the country. It ultimately sold over 6.7 million copies in the U.S. alone and earned platinum certifications in 13 countries, selling a further 10 million copies worldwide.

It was the band's last release to feature guitarist Wes Borland until the EP The Unquestionable Truth (Part 1) (2005), and the last album to featured the band's classic lineup until Gold Cobra (2011).

== Background and recording ==
In January 2000, Limp Bizkit returned to the studio to capitalize on their mainstream success stemming from Significant Other's release the previous year. The band initially hired Rick Rubin to produce the record, though creative differences culminated in him abandoning the project after less than a week, resulting in Terry Date returning to produce the record. Through multiple interviews, Fred Durst and guitarist Wes Borland often expressed that they had very little material prepared for the writing sessions, with Borland claiming during an interview in January 2000; "I don't think that we entered the studio with a method, or there's like 17,000 methods and we used all of them". Recording sessions took longer than expected as the band regularly experimented with newer material whilst simultaneously touring as headliners in Napster's Back-To-Basics tour. The longtime working title for the album had been Limpdependence Day, but this was abandoned after the band failed to meet the deadline for their original intended release date of July 4. Despite numerous delays, the band managed to compose most of their new songs by August 2000, and debuted the track "Livin' It Up" at that year's MTV Video Music Awards in a duet performance with Christina Aguilera.

=== Title and artwork ===
"Chocolate starfish" is a slang term for the human anus. "Hot dog flavored water" is based on an in-joke started by Borland at a truck stop while the band was on tour during the summer of 2000, where he saw bottles of Crystal Geyser flavored water and made a joke about having meat or hot dog-flavored water.

Durst refers to the album name in three songs. First, in "Hot Dog", he tells his detractors to, "Kiss my starfish, my chocolate starfish". Second, in "Rollin' (Air Raid Vehicle)", Durst mentions "Chocolate Starfish" in the introduction. Third, in "Livin' It Up", he declares that, "The chocolate starfish is my man Fred Durst." Borland stated in an interview when questioned on the naming of the album that, "Fred calls himself Chocolate Starfish, because people call him an asshole all the time."

Numerous critics and fans speculated that the name was a humorous parody of the Smashing Pumpkins' 1995 album Mellon Collie and the Infinite Sadness.

== Promotion ==
The band appeared at the 2000 MTV Video Music Awards in September 2000 due in large part as they were nominated for multiple awards, and in conjunction with their performance alongside Christina Aguilera. In a mashup of the two artists following Aguilera's performance of her 1999 single "Come On Over Baby (All I Want Is You)", the band played an excerpt of the song "Livin' It Up" possibly hinting at the song being a future single, though this never materialized for unknown reasons. The following weekend, the band announced a radio-broadcast listening party on New York's 92.3 WXRK live from Electric Lady Studios in New York City while they answered questions from callers, and the station played several songs of the album.

To generate further attention for the album's release; the band's management group The Firm hosted a large scale party at the Playboy Mansion in Southern California on the night of the album's release. The band aired a full hour-long special on MTV with numerous celebrities present, such as Chino Moreno from Deftones, David Silveria from Korn, Mark McGrath from Sugar Ray, Brandon Boyd from Incubus, Xzibit and more. Durst had initially approached MTV producers with his proposal for the special, which they later allowed him to cohost per his own request.

They also embarked on a fall co-headlining tour with Eminem called the Anger Management Tour through North America in late 2000, with Papa Roach, Xzibit and D12 acting as support during the first leg through November 21, 2000. On the second leg from November 24 to December 19, 2000, Godsmack, DMX and Sinnistar took over. The tour was unique for its approach to bridging the gap between rock and hip-hop.

The album's cover art was designed by Borland. It has been featured in several lists of the worst album covers of all time.

== Music and lyrics ==
The song "Hot Dog" features the word "fuck" 47 times. The chorus references the Nine Inch Nails songs "Closer", "The Perfect Drug" and "Burn". Durst said he was a big fan of Nine Inch Nails, who inspired his music, although Nine Inch Nails frontman Trent Reznor had made negative remarks about Durst during that period. Reviewers have often interpreted Durst's lyrics in "Hot Dog" as an insult to Reznor. The lyrical references to Reznor's music led to him getting a co-writer credit, which Reznor said he approved as the record was going to print as not to hold up the release. "Livin' It Up" samples "Life in the Fast Lane" by the American rock band Eagles. The lyrics of "My Generation" reference "My Generation" by the Who and "Welcome to the Jungle" by Guns N' Roses.

=== Lawsuit and sample removal ===
The track "Getcha Groove On" used an uncredited sample of music that is played during the Aerial Trapeze Act of Cirque du Soleil's Cirque Reinvente. In the September 2008 issue of Kerrang!, Wes Borland told the magazine: "We actually got sued over this piece of shit. There was some sort of sample used in it that someone didn't get full clearance for, so we ended up getting into some serious trouble for a little while." When the album was later released onto streaming services, the track "Getcha Groove On (Dirt Road Mix)", from their remix album New Old Songs, replaced the original version.

== Commercial performance ==
Chocolate Starfish and the Hot Dog Flavored Water debuted at number one on the Billboard 200. The album sold 1,054,511 copies in its first week of being released, with 400,000 of those copies being sold in the album's first day of release—the largest first-week sales debut for a rock album in the United States ever since Nielsen SoundScan began tracking album sales in 1991. It was also the fifth highest-week debut sales of 2000, behind Eminem's The Marshall Mathers LP, 'N Sync's No Strings Attached, Backstreet Boys' Black & Blue and Britney Spears' Oops!... I Did It Again. In its second week of being released, the album sold 392,000 copies, and remained at number 1 on the Billboard 200. The album also went to number 1 on the Canadian Albums Chart, selling 98,707 copies in its first week in the country. Two months after its release date, the album was certified 4× platinum by the Recording Industry Association of America (RIAA), and almost seven months after its release date, it was certified 5× platinum by the RIAA. In April 2002, the album was certified 6× platinum by the RIAA. It also was certified 6× platinum by Music Canada in October 2001.

== Critical reception ==
Professional ratings
Aggregate scores
Source	Rating
Metacritic	49/100
Review scores
Source	Rating
AllMusic	2.5/5 stars
The Daily Telegraph	5/5 stars
Entertainment Weekly	C
The Essential Rock Discography	7/10
Melody Maker	4.5/5 stars
NME	6/10
Q	3/5 stars
Rolling Stone	3.5/5 stars
The Rolling Stone Album Guide	3/5 stars
Spin	7/10

According to the review aggregator Metacritic, Chocolate Starfish and the Hot Dog Flavored Water received "mixed or average reviews" based on a weighted average score of 49 out of 100 from 12 critic scores. AllMusic writer Stephen Thomas Erlewine wrote, "Durst's self-pitying and the monotonous music give away that the band bashed Chocolate Starfish out very quickly – it's the sound of a band determined to deliver a sequel in a finite amount of time." The Rolling Stone Album Guide awarded the album three out of five stars, whereas the magazine itself gave the album a 3.5 out of 5. Readers of Kerrang! voted it as the worst album of 2000, with the band and Fred Durst also being voted the worst band of 2000 and "Arse of the Year", respectively.

Even so, Chocolate Starfish and the Hot Dog Flavored Water was listed in the book for 1001 Albums You Must Hear Before You Die, but later removed in recent editions of the book.

In 2020, it was named one of the 20 best metal albums of 2000 by Metal Hammer magazine.

== Track listing ==
All lyrics are written by Fred Durst, except where noted; all music is composed by Wes Borland, Sam Rivers and John Otto, except where noted.

No.	Title	Lyrics	Music	Length
1.	"Intro"			1:18
2.	"Hot Dog"			3:51
3.	"My Generation"			3:43
4.	"Full Nelson"			4:08
5.	"My Way"			4:32
6.	"Rollin' (Air Raid Vehicle)"			3:34
7.	"Livin' It Up"			4:24
8.	"The One"			5:44
9.	"Getcha Groove On" (featuring Xzibit) (Note: "Getcha Groove On" is replaced with the Dirt Road Mix version (4:19) from New Old Songs on streaming services and later vinyl pressings.))	Durst; Alvin Joiner	DJ Lethal	4:29
10.	"Take a Look Around"		Lalo Schifrin	5:22
11.	"It'll Be OK"			5:07
12.	"Boiler" ( (Note: "Boiler" ends at 5:45. An untitled hidden track starts immediately after "Boiler", this hidden track is omitted in the censored version.))			7:00
13.	"Hold On" (featuring Scott Weiland)	Scott Weiland; Durst		5:48
14.	"Rollin' (Urban Assault Vehicle)" (featuring DMX, Method Man and Redman)	Durst; Earl Simmons; Clifford Smith Jr.; Reginald Noble	Swizz Beatz	6:22
15.	"Outro" ( (Note: "Outro" ends at 4:50. Ben Stiller's laughs can be heard until 7:40, when hidden tracks begin. Track 15 features phone conversations and answering machine messages by Stephan Jenkins, Rob Dyrdek, and Mark Wahlberg.))			9:50
Total length:				75:02

Initial release bonus disc
No.	Title	Length
1.	"Snake in Your Face"	4:08
2.	"Back o'da Bus"	1:18
Total length:		80:28

US limited edition bonus track
No.	Title	Length
16.	"It's Like That Y'all" (featuring Run)	4:31
Total length:		79:33

Japanese limited edition bonus tracks
No.	Title	Writer(s)	Length
1.	"Crushed"		3:24
2.	"Faith"	George Michael	2:26
3.	"Counterfeit"		5:06

Special UK edition bonus tracks
No.	Title	Writer(s)	Length
1.	"Crushed"		3:24
2.	"Faith"	George Michael	2:26
3.	"Counterfeit" (Lethal Dose Mix)
4.	"Faith" (CD-ROM video)
5.	"Nookie" (CD-ROM video)
6.	"Re-Arranged" (CD-ROM video)
7.	"N2Gether Now" (CD-ROM video)

== Personnel ==
Adapted from the album's liner notes.

=== Limp Bizkit ===
- Fred Durst – vocals, art direction, liner notes, photography
- Wes Borland – guitars, cover art, vocals on "Snake in Your Face"
- DJ Lethal – turntables, samples
- John Otto – drums, vocals on "It's Like That Y'all"
- Sam Rivers – bass

=== Additional personnel ===
- Scott Borland – keyboards on tracks 2, 4, 5, 7, 8, 11, 12 & 13
- Xzibit – vocals on "Getcha Groove On"
- Scott Weiland – vocals on "Hold On"
- DMX, Redman, Method Man – vocals on "Rollin' (Urban Assault Vehicle)"
- Rich Keller – bass on "Rollin' (Urban Assault Vehicle)"
- Stephan Jenkins, Ben Stiller, Mark Wahlberg, Rob Dyrdek – spoken word on "Outro"
- Run – vocals on "It's Like That Y'all"

=== Production ===
- Producer – Terry Date and Limp Bizkit (all tracks but 9 and 14); DJ Lethal and Fred Durst (track 9); Swizz Beatz (track 14)
- Additional producer – Scott Weiland and Josh Abraham (all tracks but 9 and 14)
- Executive producer – Eve Butler
- Assistant executive producer – Peter Katsis
- Production coordination – Erin Haley
- Editing – Domenic Barbers, DJ Premier, Carl Nappa
- Editing assistant – Cailan Mccarthy
- Engineers – Eric B., Joe Barresi, Barney Chase, Terry Date, Jesse Gorman, Kevin Guarnieri, Scott Olson, Ted Reiger, Dylan Vaughan, Darren Venbitti, Rakim
- Assistant engineers – Barney Chase, Steve Conover, David Dominguez, Jaime Duncan, Fran Flannery, Kevin Guarnieri, Femio Hernández, Matt Kingdom, Carl Nappa, Pete Novak, Ted Reiger, Doug Trantow, Alex Morfas
- Mastering – Vlado Meller
- Mixing – Andy Wallace (all tracks but 9, 10 and 14), Rich Keller (track 14), Brendan O'Brien (track 10), Michael Patterson (track 9)
- Assistant mix engineers – Steve Sisco, Josh Wilbur, Ryan Williams, Karl Egsieker
- Art coordinator – Liam Wars

== Charts ==
=== Weekly charts ===
Chart (2000–2001)	Peak position
Australian Albums (ARIA)	1
Austrian Albums (Ö3 Austria)	1
Belgian Albums (Ultratop Flanders)	1
Belgian Albums (Ultratop Wallonia)	23
Canadian Albums (Billboard)	1
Danish Albums (Hitlisten)	8
Dutch Albums (Album Top 100)	1
European Albums (Music & Media)	1
Finnish Albums (Suomen virallinen lista)	2
French Albums (SNEP)	7
German Albums (Offizielle Top 100)	1
Hungarian Albums (MAHASZ)	5
Irish Albums (IRMA)	1
Italian Albums (FIMI)	6
New Zealand Albums (RMNZ)	1
Norwegian Albums (VG-lista)	5
Polish Albums (ZPAV)	2
Portuguese Albums (AFP)	1
Scottish Albums (Official Charts)	1
Spanish Albums (AFYVE)	11
Swedish Albums (Sverigetopplistan)	4
Swiss Albums (Schweizer Hitparade)	4
UK Albums (Official Charts)	1
UK Rock & Metal Albums (Official Charts)	1
US Billboard 200	1

Chart (2025)	Peak position
Portuguese Albums (AFP)	99

Chart (2026)	Peak position
German Rock & Metal Albums (Offizielle Top 100)	17
Norwegian Rock Albums (IFPI Norge)	10

=== Year-end charts ===
Chart (2000)	Position
Australian Albums (ARIA)	24
Austrian Albums (Ö3 Austria)	25
Belgian Albums (Ultratop Flanders)	19
Canadian Albums (Nielsen Soundscan)	9
Dutch Albums (Album Top 100)	29
European Albums (Music & Media)	45
German Albums (Offizielle Top 100)	38
New Zealand Albums (RMNZ)	48
South Korean International Albums (MIAK)	34
Swedish Albums & Compilations (Sverigetopplistan)	74
Swiss Albums (Schweizer Hitparade)	49
UK Albums (OCC)	63
US Billboard 200	34

Chart (2001)	Position
Australian Albums (ARIA)	9
Austrian Albums (Ö3 Austria)	12
Belgian Albums (Ultratop Flanders)	5
Belgian Alternative Albums (Ultratop Flanders)	1
Belgian Albums (Ultratop Wallonia)	55
Canadian Albums (Billboard)	33
Danish Albums (Hitlisten)	96
Dutch Albums (Album Top 100)	24
European Albums (Music & Media)	12
German Albums (Offizielle Top 100)	14
Irish Albums (IRMA)	19
New Zealand Albums (RMNZ)	9
Swedish Albums (Sverigetopplsitan)	52
Swedish Albums & Compilations (Sverigetopplistan)	70
Swiss Albums (Schweizer Hitparade)	36
UK Albums (OCC)	21
US Billboard 200	5
Worldwide Albums (IFPI)	22

Chart (2002)	Position
Canadian Alternative Albums (Billboard)	132
Canadian Metal Albums (Billboard)	69

Chart (2025)	Position
Belgian Albums (Ultratop Flanders)	149

=== Decade-end charts ===
Chart (2000–2009)	Position
Australian Albums (ARIA)	93
US Billboard 200	18

== Certifications ==
Region	Certification	Certified units/sales
Argentina (CAPIF)	Gold	30,000^{^}
Australia (ARIA)	5× Platinum	350,000^{^}
Austria (IFPI Austria)	Platinum	50,000^{*}
Belgium (BRMA)	Platinum	50,000^{*}
Brazil (Pro-Música Brasil)	Gold	100,000^{*}
Canada (Music Canada)	6× Platinum	600,000^{^}
Denmark (IFPI Danmark)	Gold	25,000^{^}
Finland (Musiikkituottajat)	Platinum	52,202
France (SNEP)	Gold	100,000^{*}
Germany (BVMI)	5× Gold	750,000^{‡}
Hungary (MAHASZ)	Gold	
Italy (FIMI) sales since 2009	Gold	25,000^{‡}
Japan (RIAJ)	Platinum	200,000^{^}
Mexico (AMPROFON)	Platinum+Gold	225,000^{^}
Netherlands (NVPI)	Platinum	80,000^{^}
New Zealand (RMNZ)	5× Platinum	75,000^{^}
Poland (ZPAV)	Gold	50,000^{*}
Spain (Promusicae)	Gold	50,000^{^}
Sweden (GLF)	Gold	40,000^{^}
Switzerland (IFPI Switzerland)	Platinum	50,000^{^}
United Kingdom (BPI)	3× Platinum	900,000^{‡}
United States (RIAA)	6× Platinum	6,000,000^{^}
Uruguay (CUD)	Gold	3,000^{^}
Summaries
Europe (IFPI)	2× Platinum	2,000,000^{*}
^{*} Sales figures based on certification alone.^{^} Shipments figures based on certification alone.^{‡} Sales+streaming figures based on certification alone.
