= Sausage water =

Water used to cook sausages

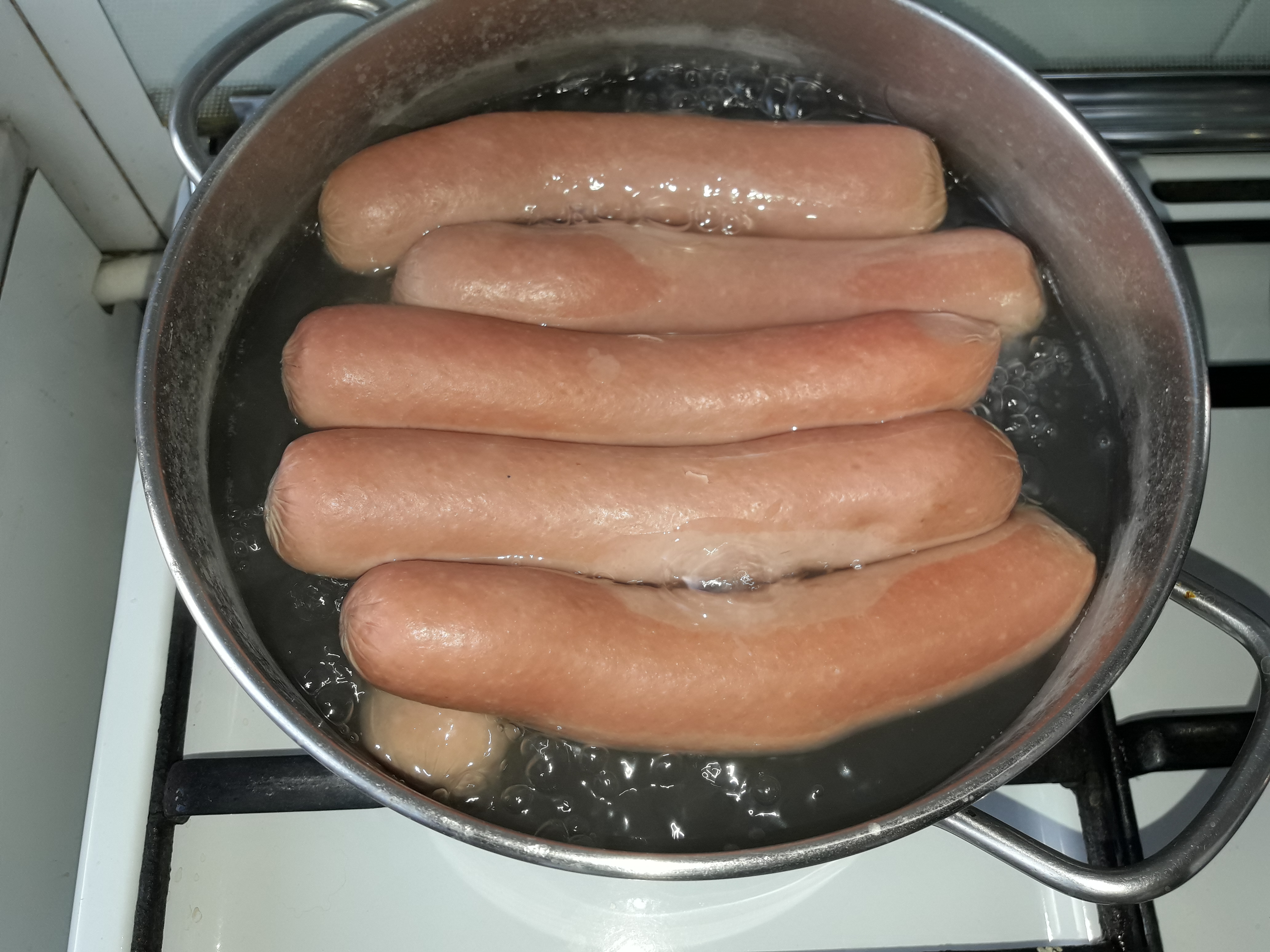
Boiling Vienna sausage

Sausage water is the used boiling liquid after boiling sausages for consumption; hot dog water is specific to preparing boiled hot dogs. Typically considered food waste, sausage water is infrequently consumed as part of local delicacies and culture, or used as a humorous subject.

== Variants ==
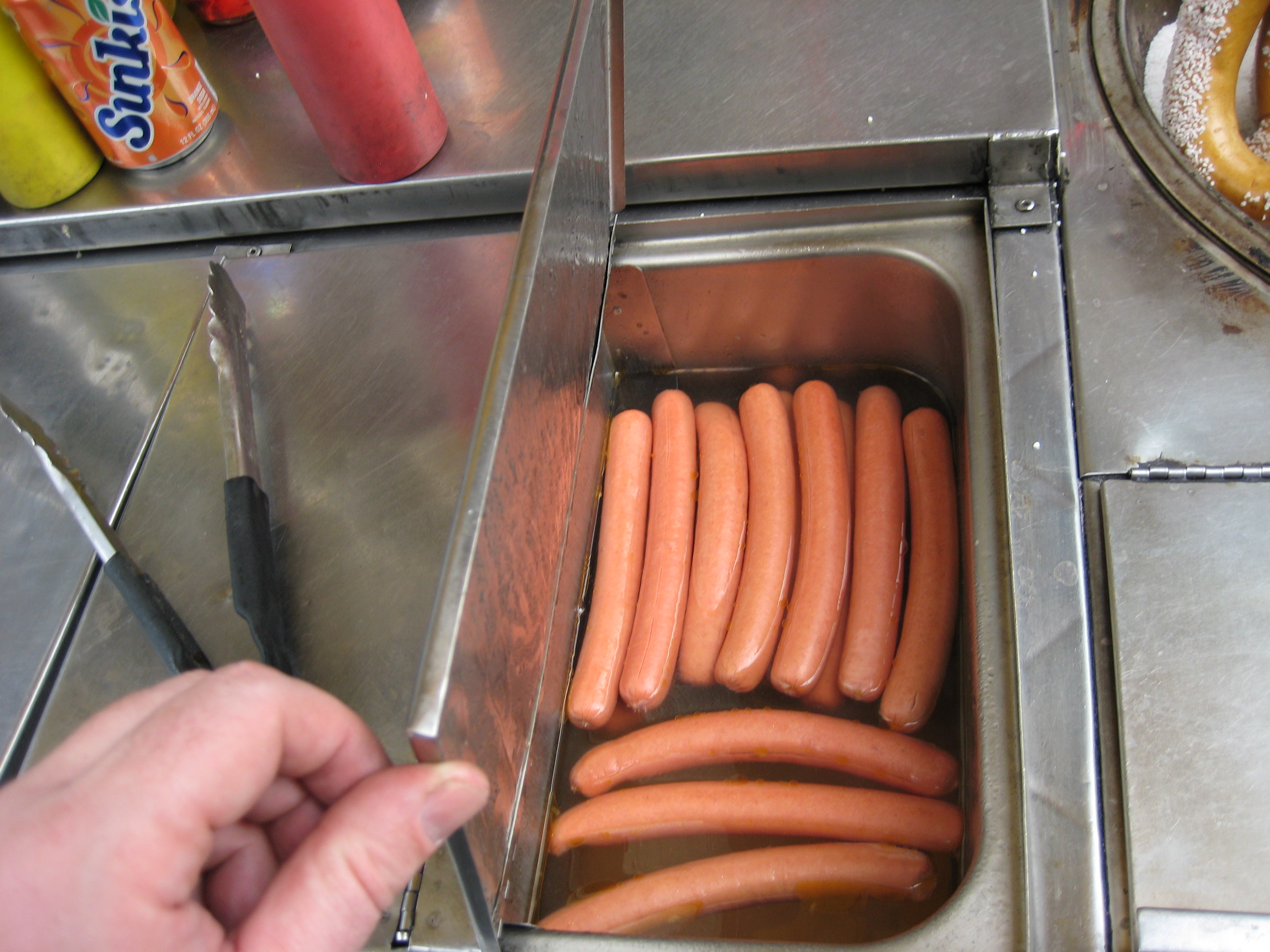
Dirty water dogs in 'dirty' seasoned water in hot dog cart, New York City

Among hot dog carts of New York City, operators poach and warm their hot dogs in 'dirty' hot dog water, calling them 'dirty water dogs.' The water is flavored with cumin, ketchup, nutmeg, onion, red pepper, tomato sauce, vinegar, and other seasonings.

== Consumption ==
At the Aspmyra Stadion of FK Bodø/Glimt in Bodø, Norway, the concession stand traditionally sells club supporters sausage water (Norwegian: pølsevann) to drink. The beverage is valued as a warm delicacy in the Arctic conditions of Nordland, as well as a unifying means of self-identification among supporters.

White borscht, a Polish cuisine variant of sour cereal soup, is based on the sausage water made from boiling the constituent biała kiełbasa.

=== Novelty products ===
On March 28th, 2024, 7-Eleven announced a sparkling canned hot dog water product, flavored with ketchup and mustard, alongside other new sparkling water products. The announcement was confirmed as a joke on April Fool's Day, but a limited run of the product was created for media distribution.

There have been various limited-run novelty alcoholic beverages featuring hot dog water: Neshaminy Creek Brewing Company's 2020 "Project Hop Dog" IPA, in collaboration with Sheetz; Martin House Brewery's 2022 "Bun Length" hard seltzer; Bismarck Distillery's 2024 "Hot Dog Water", in collaboration with the Bismarck Larks; and Insight Brewing's 2024 "Glizzy McGuire" hard seltzer.

== In media ==
The October 2000 Limp Bizkit album Chocolate Starfish and the Hot Dog Flavored Water was named after an inside joke amongst the band, revolving around the surreal humor of spring water bottler Crystal Geyser selling hot dog flavored water.

In the 2010-2013 animated TV series Scooby-Doo! Mystery Incorporated, temporary member of Mystery Incorporated, Marcie Fleach, is also nicknamed "Hot Dog Water". The character was intended by showrunner Tony Cervone as a lesbian love interest to main character Velma Dinkley, but the relationship was forced to be downplayed to better fit the lesbian media portrayals on television at the time.

== In the arts ==
At the 2018 celebration of Car Free Day Vancouver, a Canadian artist sold hot dog water (stylized "HÕT DÕG WATER"), intended as performance art criticizing the wellness industry; the hot dog water was marketed as ketogenic diet-friendly, a nootropic, and an anti-aging product, among other claims. The artist sold 60 bottles to festival goers for CA$38.99 each (equivalent to US$28.57 at the time). The art installation returned outside the October 2018 Goop wellness summit at the Stanley Park Pavilion in Vancouver, in mockery of the company's criticized activities; the artist's team was turned away from the summit by security.

In 2023, self-described "meme artist" Sunday Nobody's Project Hot Dog involved the production of 394 ice sculptures of hot dogs made from frozen hot dog water, produced with a custom-milled aluminum mold. The sculptures were sold online for $44 each, and purposely mailed by Sunday Nobody in normal packages as opposed to insulated shipping containers, to ensure they arrived melted.

== See also ==
- Bovril, a meat-extract paste drank with water at British football stadiums
