= My Way (Limp Bizkit song) =

2001 single by Limp Bizkit

Single by Limp Bizkit

from the album Chocolate Starfish and the Hot Dog Flavored Water
- Released: February 13, 2001
- Genre: Nu metal
- Length: 4:32
- Label: Flip; Interscope
- Composers: Wes Borland; Sam Rivers; John Otto
- Lyricist: Fred Durst
- Producers: Terry Date; Limp Bizkit

Limp Bizkit singles chronology
"Rollin (Air Raid Vehicle)" (2000)	"My Way" (2001)	"Boiler" (2001)

Music video
- "My Way" on YouTube

"My Way" is a song by American nu metal band Limp Bizkit from their third studio album, Chocolate Starfish and the Hot Dog Flavored Water (2000). It was the fourth single released from the album. The song is also known for being the main theme song for the then-World Wrestling Federation pay-per-view WrestleMania X-Seven.

== Reception ==
In 2022, Louder Sound and Kerrang ranked the song number five and number six, respectively, on their lists of Limp Bizkit's greatest songs.

== Music video ==
At the beginning of the video, Fred Durst and Wes Borland are conversing on what should be done for the song's music video, as the two have no ideas, and Durst suggests that they check "wardrobe" for ideas, as they have some "really funny stuff in wardrobe". The video then follows the band's various antics as they attempt to film the video in a variety of settings, including a big band where Durst conducts the rest of the band, a line of motorcycles on which they ride, and a jungle with them dressed up as cavemen.

== Track listings ==
Australian CD1

1. "My Way" (album version)
2. "My Way" (William Orbit remix)
3. "My Way" (William Orbit edit)
4. "My Way" (enhanced video)

Australian CD2

1. "My Way" (album version)
2. "My Way" (Pistols Dancehall dub)
3. "My Way" (Dub Pistols instrumental)
4. "Counterfeit" (Lethal Dose mix)

Japanese and European maxi-CD single

1. "My Way" (album version)
2. "My Way" (William Orbit remix)
3. "My Way" (William Orbit instrumental)
4. "My Way" (enhanced video)

European CD single

1. "My Way" (album version)
2. "My Way" (William Orbit remix)

UK CD1

1. "My Way" (album version)
2. "My Way" (William Orbit remix—full length)
3. "My Way" (DJ Premier remix—main)
4. "My Way" (CD-ROM video)

UK CD2

1. "My Way" (album version)
2. "My Way" (Dub Pistols Dancehall dub)
3. "My Way" (Dub Pistols remix instrumental)

UK cassette single

1. "My Way" (album version)
2. "Rollin' (Air Raid Vehicle)" (album version)

== Charts ==
=== Weekly charts ===
Chart (2001–2013)	Peak position
Australia (ARIA)	57
Austria (Ö3 Austria Top 40)	51
Belgium (Ultratip Bubbling Under Flanders)	6
Belgium (Ultratip Bubbling Under Wallonia)	18
Canada Radio (Nielsen BDS)	95
Canada Rock (Nielsen BDS)	24
Denmark (Tracklisten)	17
Europe (Eurochart Hot 100)	24
Finland (Suomen virallinen lista)	20
Germany (GfK)	38
Ireland (IRMA)	10
Italy (FIMI)	36
Netherlands (Single Top 100)	56
New Zealand (Recorded Music NZ)	41
Norway (VG-lista)	12
Scotland Singles (OCC)	3
Sweden (Sverigetopplistan)	30
Switzerland (Schweizer Hitparade)	99
UK Singles (OCC)	6
UK Rock & Metal (OCC)	9
US Billboard Hot 100	75
US Alternative Airplay (Billboard)	3
US Mainstream Rock (Billboard)	4
US Pop Airplay (Billboard)	40

=== Year-end charts ===
Chart (2001)	Position
Ireland (IRMA)	99
UK Singles (OCC)	132
US Mainstream Rock Tracks (Billboard)	19
US Modern Rock Tracks (Billboard)	19

== Certifications ==
Region	Certification	Certified units/sales
New Zealand (RMNZ)	2× Platinum	60,000^{‡}
United Kingdom (BPI)	Platinum	600,000^{‡}
^{‡} Sales+streaming figures based on certification alone.

== Release history ==
Region	Date	Format(s)	Label(s)	Ref.
United States	February 13, 2001	Mainstream rock; active rock radio	Flip; Interscope	
United States	March 27, 2001	Contemporary hit radio	Flip; Interscope	
Australia	June 4, 2001	CD	Flip; Interscope	
New Zealand	June 11, 2001	CD	Flip; Interscope	
United Kingdom	June 11, 2001	CD; cassette	Flip; Interscope	
Japan	September 19, 2001	CD	Flip; Interscope	
