= Dysfunctional Family Picnic =

Alternative rock concert in New York City

K-Rock Dysfunctional Family Picnic
- Genre: Rock, Metal, Punk, Hip hop, Post-hardcore, Rap, Reggae, Ska
- Dates: Summer
- Location: New York, New York
- Years active: 1997–2004, 2008
- Founders: K-Rock
- Website: 92.3 K-Rock (Archived - May 12, 2008)

Dysfunctional Family Picnic was a multi-artist alternative rock concert, presented annually by the New York City, New York, US radio station K-Rock, beginning in 1997. Its West Coast "sister" concert is the KROQ Weenie Roast.

== History ==
There have been various venues that hosted the Dysfunctional Family Picnic including Forest Hills Tennis Stadium in Queens, New York, PNC Bank Arts Center in Holmdel, New Jersey, Giants Stadium, in East Rutherford, New Jersey, and Jones Beach Amphitheatre in Wantagh, New York.

In 2003, the Dysfunctional Family Picnic was called "DFP 7-Tarium". Instead of booking an original show, it was just another stop on Metallica's Summer Sanitarium tour.

After K-Rock returned to the air in 2007 following a brief and unsuccessful stint as an affiliate of the short-lived hot talk-formatted radio brand Free FM, "Return of the Rock" was their first concert. The comeback ended up a one-off, as K-Rock ended for good in 2009 when it flipped to Top 40 as "92.3 Now".

== Lineups (1997 - 2008) ==
Bands listed in reverse order of night's performance (or alphabetical order if not known).

Date	Event	Lineup
July 1, 1997	Dysfunctional Family Picnic	Bush, Foo Fighters, Echo & the Bunnymen, Blur, Soul Coughing, Luscious Jackson.
May 30, 1998	Revenge of Dysfunctional Family Picnic	Third Eye Blind, Scott Weiland of Stone Temple Pilots, Green Day, the Offspring, Ben Folds Five, Soul Asylum, Fuel, King Norris, Stuttering John.
June 11, 1999	DFP 3.0	Rage Against the Machine, Limp Bizkit, Rob Zombie, Lo-Fidelity Allstars, Blink 182, Live, Kid Rock, King Norris, Stuttering John, Stone Temple Pilots (cancelled), Hole (cancelled).
June 23, 2000	DFP 4.0	Creed, Ozzy Osbourne, Stone Temple Pilots, Limp Bizkit, Godsmack, Deftones, Sevendust
June 22, 2001	DFP 5.0	Jane's Addiction, Stone Temple Pilots, Blink 182, Staind, Papa Roach, Linkin Park, 3 Doors Down, Disturbed, Crazy Town, Adema.
June 8, 2002	DFP 6.0	System of a Down, Korn, Papa Roach, Incubus, P.O.D., Jimmy Eat World, Hoobastank, The Strokes, New Found Glory, Home Town Hero, 3rd Strike.
July 8, 2003	DFP 7-Tarium	Metallica, Limp Bizkit, Linkin Park, Deftones, Mudvayne.
June 19, 2004	DFP 8.0	Main Stage: The Strokes, Jay-Z performing “99 Problems”, Beastie Boys, The Darkness, Cypress Hill, Brand New, Yeah Yeah Yeahs. Festival Stage: New Found Glory, Story Of The Year, Taking Back Sunday, Midtown, Vertigo Blue.
May 31, 2008	Return of the Rock	Stone Temple Pilots, Filter, Ashes Divide
