= Rollin' (Limp Bizkit song) =

2000 single by Limp Bizkit

"Rollin' (Air Raid Vehicle)"

Single by Limp Bizkit

from the album Chocolate Starfish and the Hot Dog Flavored Water
- Released: September 5, 2000
- Studio: Metalworks (Mississauga, Ontario)
- Genre: Nu metal; rap metal
- Length: 3:33
- Label: Flip; Interscope
- Composers: Wes Borland; Sam Rivers; John Otto
- Lyricist: Fred Durst
- Producers: Terry Date; Limp Bizkit

Limp Bizkit singles chronology
"My Generation" (2000)	"Rollin' (Air Raid Vehicle)" (2000)	"My Way" (2001)

Music video
- "Rollin' (Air Raid Vehicle)" on YouTube

"Rollin' (Urban Assault Vehicle)"
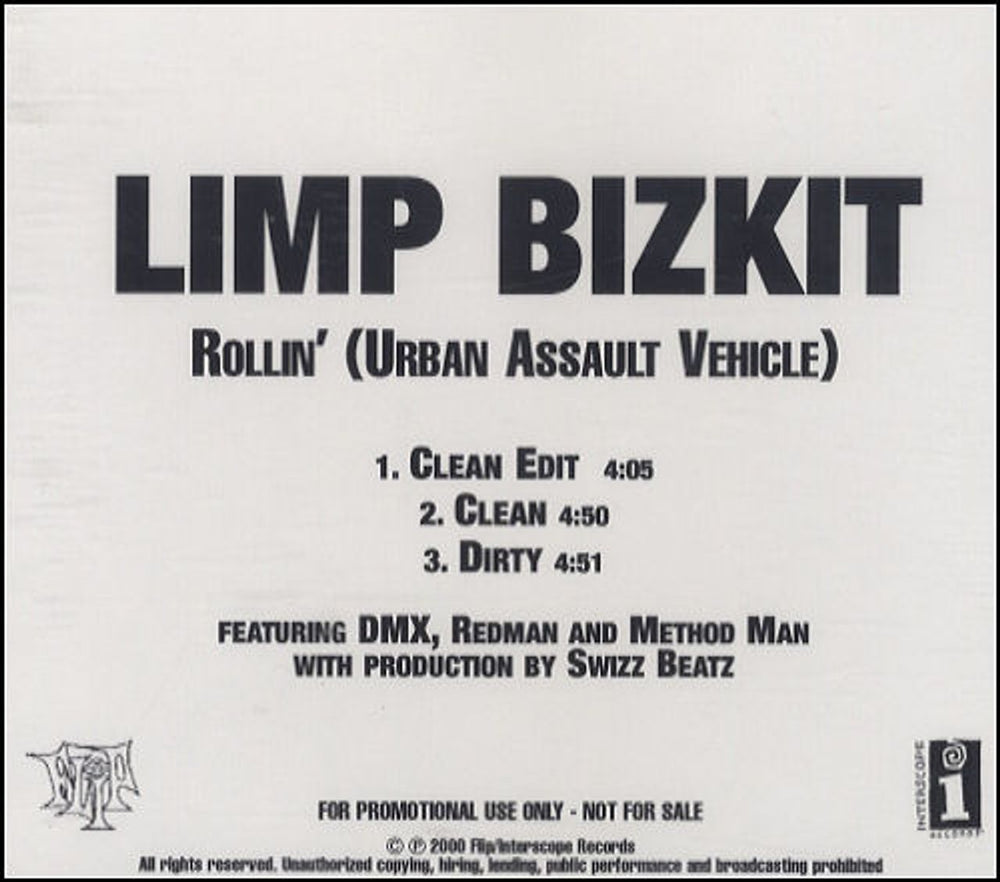

Promotional single by Limp Bizkit featuring DMX, Method Man & Redman

from the album Chocolate Starfish and the Hot Dog Flavored Water
- Released: October 17, 2000
- Length: 6:23
- Label: Flip; Interscope
- Composer: Kasseem Dean
- Lyricists: Fred Durst; Earl Simmons; Clifford Smith; Reginald Noble
- Producer: Swizz Beatz

"Rollin' (Air Raid Vehicle)" is a song by the American nu metal band Limp Bizkit from their album Chocolate Starfish and the Hot Dog Flavored Water. It was released as the second and third single simultaneously, along with "My Generation", on September 5, 2000.

"Rollin' (Urban Assault Vehicle)" was the original version of the song, although sometimes it is referred to as a hip-hop remix of "Rollin' (Air Raid Vehicle)". It features hip-hop artists DMX, Method Man and Redman, and was produced by Swizz Beatz. It is included as the penultimate track on the Chocolate Starfish album. This version is also featured on the soundtrack to the 2001 film The Fast and the Furious.

== Writing and recording ==
"Rollin'" was created through a collaborative effort with hip-hop producer Swizz Beatz. Although sometimes referred to as a hip-hop remix, the "Urban Assault Vehicle" version of the song was actually the first version that was created. Fred Durst and Swizz Beatz worked together to create this version and when it was presented to the band there was some initial frustration. The band felt the song might work better as a rock song, which led to the creation of the "Air Raid Vehicle" version of the song. Wes Borland would later state "we liked both versions so much that that's what it ended up being, two versions: a hip-hop version of the song and a rock version of the song."

== Music video ==
The "Air Raid Vehicle" version received a music video. The video begins with Ben Stiller and Stephen Dorff pulling up in front of The Roxy Hotel in a Bentley Azure, listening to Limp Bizkit's My Generation, where Fred Durst is sitting on a public bench. Mistaking him for the parking valet, Stiller gives Durst the car keys. The video also features scenes of Fred Durst with five girls dancing in a room. The video was filmed around the same time as the film Zoolander, explaining Stiller's appearance (Durst has a small cameo in that film). Parts of the music video were filmed in September 2000 atop the South Tower of the original World Trade Center in New York City. The rest of the video has several cuts of Durst and the band hanging out of the Bentley as they drive around Manhattan; also making a cameo is break-dancer Mr. Wiggles.

The video received the award for Best Rock Video at the 2001 MTV Video Music Awards. Incidentally, just one day before the September 11 attacks and collapse of the World Trade Center, on September 10, 2001, Limp Bizkit received a letter and a fruit basket from the Port Authority of New York and New Jersey, thanking them for featuring the Twin Towers in the video and congratulating the band after the video had won the VMA for Best Rock Video at the VMAs on September 6.

About the music video, Durst said: "It felt like we just started to poke fun at what people thought we were and embrace that. That's why we made the Rollin' video. There were red caps everywhere, and look at Wes at the beginning of the video with his grills in. How the hell did people not realize we weren't being serious? We thought it was hilarious."

In 2018, the staff of Metal Hammer included the video in the site's list of "the 13 best nu metal videos".

== Reception ==
The "Air Raid Vehicle" version was listed on VH1's list of the 50 Most Awesomely Bad Songs. In 2022, Louder Sound and Kerrang ranked the song number eight and number nine on their lists of Limp Bizkit's greatest songs.

The song peaked at number 65 on the US Billboard Hot 100, giving the band their highest-charting single in the US, and remained on the chart for 17 weeks. Its run was entirely because of airplay, as it reached number 60 on the radio component chart while making no appearance on the Hot Single Sales chart. Internationally, "Rollin'" topped the charts in Ireland and the United Kingdom and peaked within the top 10 of the charts in Austria, Finland, Germany, Norway, Portugal, and Sweden.

== Track listings ==
The song was released in three versions, each with a different cover color and track listing. There was also a DVD that was only released in the United Kingdom.

CD1

1. "Rollin' (Air Raid Vehicle)"
2. "I Would for You (Jane's Addiction cover) (Live)"
3. "Take a Look Around (Instrumental)"
4. "Rollin' (Air Raid Vehicle)" (music video)

CD2

1. "Rollin' (Air Raid Vehicle)"
2. "Show Me What You Got"
3. "Rollin' (Instrumental)"
4. Video Snippets

DVD

1. Video Snippets
2. "My Generation" – 0:30
3. "N 2 Gether Now" – 0:30
4. "Break Stuff" – 0:30
5. "Re-Arranged" – 0:30

== Charts ==
=== Weekly charts ===
Chart (2000–2001)	Peak position
Australia (ARIA)	11
Austria (Ö3 Austria Top 40)	10
Belgium (Ultratop 50 Flanders)	23
Belgium (Ultratip Bubbling Under Wallonia)	13
Europe (Eurochart Hot 100)	4
Finland (Suomen virallinen lista)	3
France (SNEP)	72
Germany (GfK)	10
Ireland (IRMA)	1
Netherlands (Dutch Top 40)	16
Netherlands (Single Top 100)	18
New Zealand (Recorded Music NZ)	14
Norway (VG-lista)	9
Portugal (AFP)	6
Scottish Singles Sales (Official Charts)	1
Sweden (Sverigetopplistan)	8
Switzerland (Schweizer Hitparade)	21
UK Singles (Official Charts)	1
UK Rock & Metal (Official Charts)	1
US Billboard Hot 100	65
US Alternative Airplay (Billboard)	4
US Mainstream Rock (Billboard)	10

=== Year-end charts ===
Chart (2000)	Position
US Mainstream Rock Tracks (Billboard)	100
US Modern Rock Tracks (Billboard)	70

Chart (2001)	Position
Australia (ARIA)	45
Austria (Ö3 Austria Top 40)	53
Europe (Eurochart Hot 100)	58
Germany (Media Control)	83
Ireland (IRMA)	27
Sweden (Hitlistan)	66
UK Singles (OCC)	27
US Mainstream Rock Tracks (Billboard)	36
US Modern Rock Tracks (Billboard)	40

=== Decade-end charts ===
20s Decade-end chart performance
Chart (2025–2026)	Position
Russia Streaming (TopHit)	195

== Certifications ==
Region	Certification	Certified units/sales
Australia (ARIA)	Gold	35,000^{^}
Denmark (IFPI Danmark)	Gold	45,000^{‡}
Germany (BVMI)	Platinum	600,000^{‡}
New Zealand (RMNZ)	2× Platinum	60,000^{‡}
Spain (Promusicae)	Gold	50,000^{‡}
United Kingdom (BPI)	2× Platinum	1,200,000^{‡}
^{^} Shipments figures based on certification alone.^{‡} Sales+streaming figures based on certification alone.

== Release history ==
Region	Date	Format(s)	Label(s)	Ref.
United States	September 5, 2000	Mainstream rock; active rock; alternative radio	Flip; Interscope	
United States	October 31, 2000	Urban radio	Flip; Interscope	
Australia	January 15, 2001	CD	Flip; Interscope	
United Kingdom	January 15, 2001	CD; cassette	Flip; Interscope	
Japan	July 18, 2001	CD	Flip; Interscope	
