= Limp Bizkit =

American nu metal band

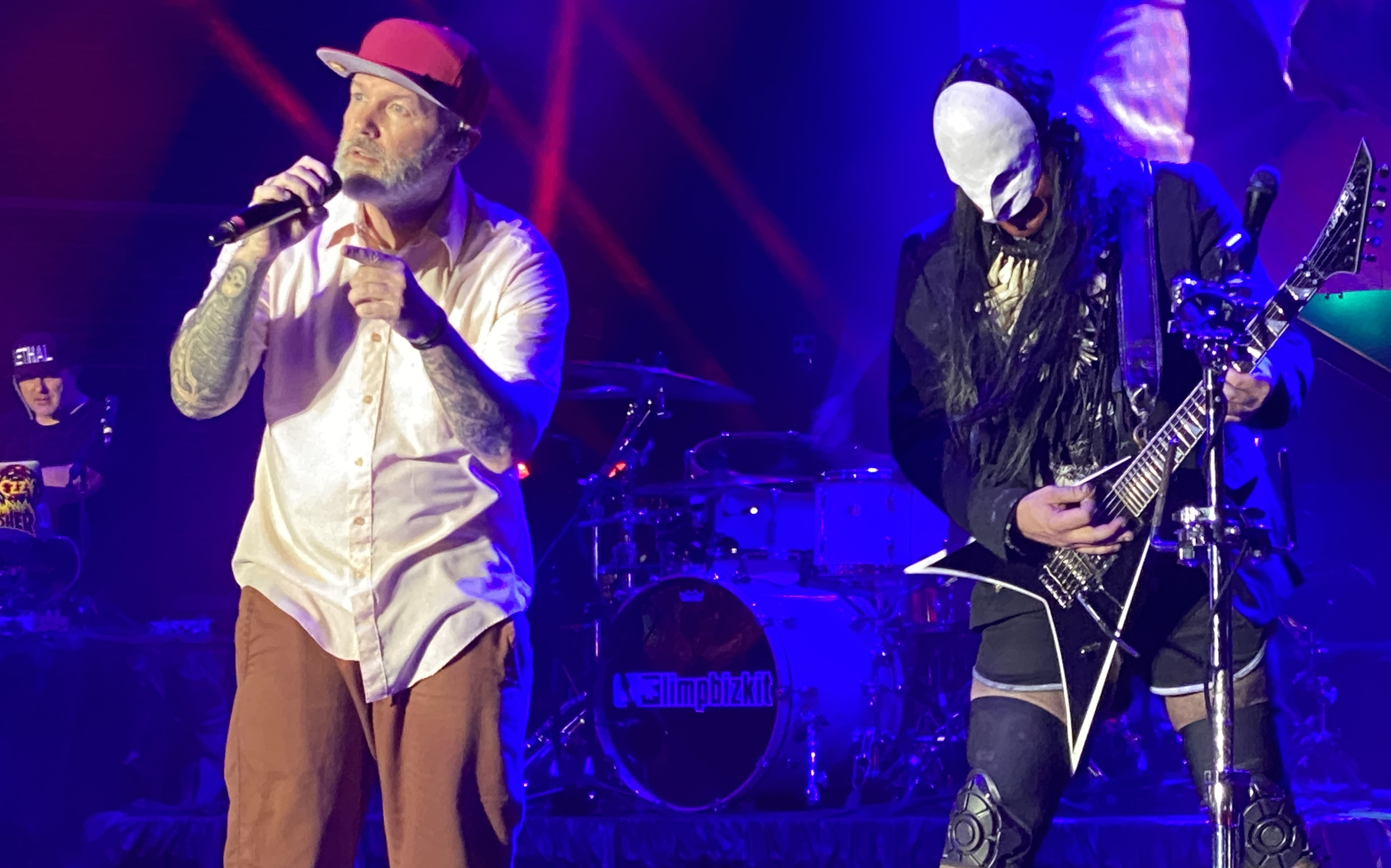
- Left to right: DJ Lethal, Fred Durst, John Otto and Wes Borland performing at Festival of the Lakes in Hammond, Indiana in 2021

Background information
- Origin: Jacksonville, Florida, U.S.
- Genres: Nu metal; rap metal; rap rock
- Works: Discography
- Years active: 1994–2006; 2009–present
- Labels: Flip; Interscope; Mojo; Suretone; Cash Money; Hollywood
- Spinoffs: Big Dumb Face; Sleepkillers
- Spinoff of: Goatslayer; House of Pain
- Members: Fred Durst; John Otto; Wes Borland; DJ Lethal
- Past members: Sam Rivers; Rob Waters; Terry Balsamo; Scott Borland; Mike Smith
- Website: limpbizkit.com

Limp Bizkit is an American nu metal band from Jacksonville, Florida. Its lineup consists of lead vocalist Fred Durst, drummer John Otto, guitarist Wes Borland, and turntablist DJ Lethal. The band's musical style is marked by Durst's angry vocal delivery and Borland's sonic experimentation. The band is one of the most successful nu metal bands of all time. It has been nominated for three Grammy Awards, sold 40 million records worldwide, and won several other awards.

Formed in 1994 by Durst and Sam Rivers, the band was soon joined by John Otto and later Wes Borland. Limp Bizkit became popular playing in the Jacksonville underground music scene in the late 1990s, and signed with Flip Records (with distribution from Interscope), who released the band's debut album, Three Dollar Bill, Y'all (1997). The band achieved mainstream success with its second and third studio albums, Significant Other (1999) and Chocolate Starfish and the Hot Dog Flavored Water (2000). However, this success was marred by a series of controversies surrounding its performances at Woodstock '99 and the 2001 Big Day Out festival.

Borland left the group in 2001; however, Durst, Rivers, Otto, and Lethal continued to record and tour with guitarist Mike Smith. Following the release of their fourth album Results May Vary (2003), Borland rejoined the band and recorded the EP The Unquestionable Truth (Part 1) (2005) with Durst, Rivers, Lethal, and drummer Sammy Siegler before entering a hiatus. In 2009, the band once again reunited with Borland playing guitar and began touring, culminating with the recording of the album Gold Cobra (2011), after which it left Interscope and later signed with Cash Money Records; DJ Lethal quit the band soon afterward, returning in 2018. After years of teasing an album tentatively titled Stampede of the Disco Elephants, the band released its sixth studio album Still Sucks on October 31, 2021. Founding bassist Rivers, who was also responsible for recruiting Otto into the band, died on October 18, 2025.

The band has released 26 singles. Their most notable singles include "Nookie", "Re-Arranged", "Break Stuff", "Take a Look Around", "Rollin' (Air Raid Vehicle)", "My Generation", "My Way", "Eat You Alive", and their cover of The Who's 1971 single "Behind Blue Eyes"; all of these have charted within the top 20 of the US Alternative Airplay Chart.

== History ==
=== Formation and early years (1994–1996) ===
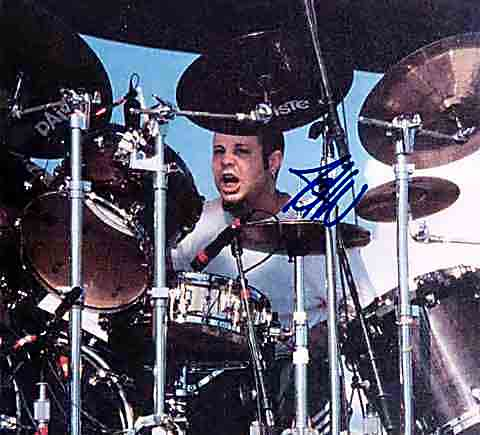
John Otto studied jazz drumming and played in local avant garde bands before joining Limp Bizkit.

While growing up in Gastonia, North Carolina, Fred Durst took an interest in breakdancing, hip-hop, punk rock, and heavy metal. He began to rap, skate, beatbox, and DJ.

While mowing lawns and working as a tattoo artist, he developed an idea for a band that combined elements of rock and hip-hop. Durst played with three other bands, all of which were unsuccessful: Split 26, Malachi Sage, and 10 Foot Shindig, which Durst left to form a new band. Durst told Sam Rivers, the bassist for Malachi Sage, "You need to quit this band and start a band with me that's like this: rappin' and rockin'." Rivers suggested that John Otto, who was studying jazz drumming at the Douglas Anderson School of the Arts and playing in local avant garde bands, become the band's drummer. Durst, Rivers, and Otto jammed and wrote three songs together and after brief stints with guitarists Rob Waters and Terry Balsamo, Wes Borland joined as their permanent guitarist.

Durst named the band Limp Bizkit because he wanted a name that would repel listeners. According to Durst, "The name is there to turn people's heads away. A lot of people pick up the disc and go, 'Limp Bizkit. Oh, they must suck.' Those are the people that we don't even want listening to our music." Durst said that the band liked quirky and corny things and that they did not take themselves seriously all the time. Thus, the name "Limp Bizkit" represented these characteristics and the band as a whole. Other names that were considered by Durst included Gimp Disco, Split Dickslit, Bitch Piglet, and Blood Fart. Every record label that showed an interest in the band pressured its members to change its name. On an article for The Grand Rapids Press in November 1997, Borland stated "just because they wanted us to do it, we were determined not to change the name. We gave them other options, like Funky Moses and the Red Sea Pedestrians, and 600 Pounds of Furious Pig".

Limp Bizkit developed a cult following in the underground music scene, particularly at the Milk Bar, an underground punk club in Jacksonville. The band's local popularity was such that Sugar Ray, who had a major label contract, opened for a then-unsigned Limp Bizkit at Velocity with hip-hop group Funkdoobiest. Milk Bar owner Danny Wimmer stated that Limp Bizkit "had the biggest draw for a local band. They went from playing [for] ten people to eight hundred within months. Fred ... was always marketing the band. He would go to record stores and get people involved, he was in touch with high schools." However, the band knew that to achieve national success, it would have to distinguish itself in its live performances. Attracting crowds by word of mouth, the band gave energetic live performances, covering George Michael's "Faith" and Paula Abdul's "Straight Up" and featuring Borland in bizarre costumes. Borland's theatrical rock style was the primary attraction for many concert attendees.

Durst unsuccessfully tried to attract attention from A&R representatives at various labels by pretending to be the band's manager. Later, when Korn performed in town as the opening act for Sick of It All, Durst invited Korn to drink beer and tattoo them. Although Durst's tattoos were unimpressive, he was able to persuade Reginald "Fieldy" Arvizu to listen to a demo, consisting of the songs "Pollution", "Counterfeit", and "Stalemate". Korn then added Limp Bizkit, still unsigned, to two tours that exposed the band to a new audience. The band attempted to expand its sound by auditioning an additional guitarist, but Borland soon determined that another guitarist was not the answer and DJ Lethal, formerly of the hip-hop group House of Pain, joined the band as a turntablist after a successful practice performance. Joining the band gave Lethal an opportunity to experiment with his turntable technique in ways that hip-hop had not allowed him to do, helping shape the band's style. Due to creative differences, Borland left the band at this point.

=== Record label deals and Three Dollar Bill, Y'all (1997–1998) ===
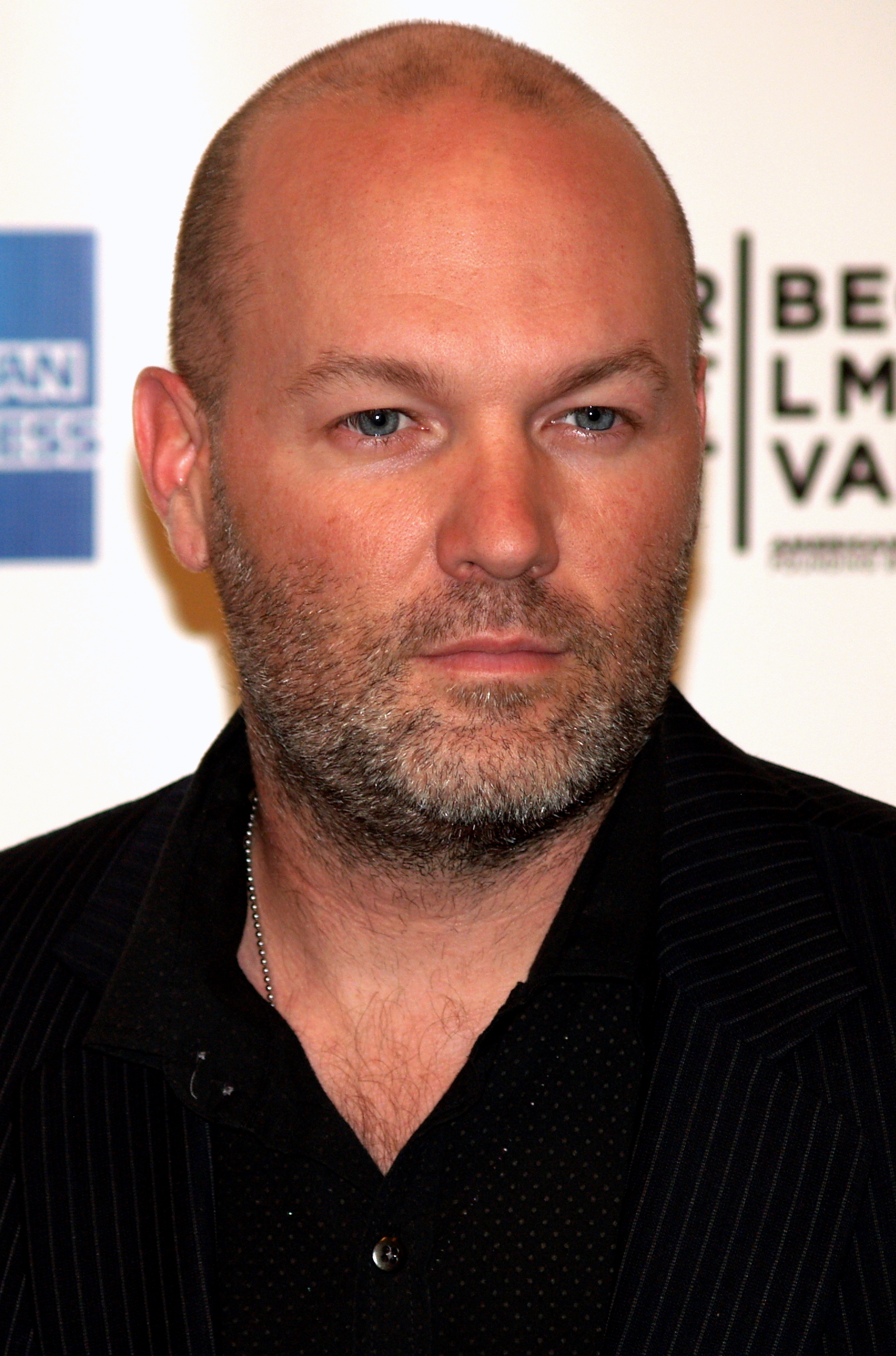
Following the release of Three Dollar Bill, Y'all, vocalist Fred Durst was appointed senior vice president of A&R at Interscope.

After its performance opening for Korn at the Dragonfly in Hollywood was well received, Limp Bizkit were offered a record deal with the Los Angeles-based independent label Flip Records, who attempted to sign the band for $50,000. Soon after that, however, they were also offered a record deal with the major label Mojo, a subsidiary of MCA Records. According to Flip Records' founder Jordan Schur, Limp Bizkit stated that the only way the band would not sign with Mojo was if the band's van flipped over on the way to Los Angeles.

While heading to California to record its first album, the band's van flipped over five times, resulting in all of the band's members sustaining serious injuries. As a result of the near-death experience, Durst made amends with Borland, who rejoined the band. The accident also strained the band's relationship with Mojo, who Durst felt wanted the band to resume working prematurely, resulting in Schur buying out the band's record and management contract and signing the band to Flip, which cost him $175,000.

Arvizu persuaded Ross Robinson to listen to the demo. Robinson neglected to listen to it until it was appraised by his girlfriend. Impressed by the band's motivation and sound, Robinson produced Limp Bizkit's debut, which was recorded at Indigo Ranch. Durst's problems with his girlfriend inspired him to write the song "Sour". The mood and tone set by Robinson in the studio allowed the band to improvise; a recording of the band improvising appeared as the last track on the album, "Everything". Schur bankrolled the recording sessions for the album, and following its completion negotiated a 50/50 agreement with Interscope Records to distribute the album.

Despite the success of live performances of the band's cover of the song "Faith", Robinson was opposed to recording it and tried to persuade the band not to play it on the album. However, the final recording, which incorporated heavier guitar playing and drumming as well as DJ scratching, impressed him. Robinson also bonded with Borland, who he perceived as not taking the band seriously. The progressive metal band Tool provided a strong influence in shaping the album's sound, particularly in the song "Nobody Loves Me", which contains a breakdown in which Durst imitated the singing style of Maynard James Keenan.

Continuing the band's policy of using names that would repulse potential listeners, Limp Bizkit named the album by using part of the phrase "queer as a three dollar bill" and adding the word "Y'all" for Florida flavor, titling it Three Dollar Bill, Y'all. The completed album featured an abrasive, angry sound which Limp Bizkit used to attract listeners to its music.

After the band completed recording, they toured with Korn and Helmet in 1997. Critics reacted unfavorably to performances of Korn and Limp Bizkit; Milwaukee Journal-Sentinel music critic Jon M. Gilbertson criticized Durst's performance, stating "The one attention-grabbing moment of Limp Bizkit's rap/thrash show was when the lead singer expressed a desire for gay men to be 'stomped'. Which isn't remotely rebellious. It's just puerile." That same year, they also notably served as an opening act on the Album of the Year Tour for Faith No More, a band often credited as paving the way for Limp Bizkit and the nu metal genre. They were subject to a hostile reception from Faith No More's fans, with the group's keyboardist Roddy Bottum later recalling, "That guy Fred Durst had a really bad attitude. He was kind of a jerk. I remembered he called the audience faggots at one show when they booed him. Not a good scene."

Interscope proposed to the band that the label pay $5,000 to guarantee that a Portland, Oregon, radio station play the song "Counterfeit" fifty times, preceded and concluded with an announcement that the air time was paid for by Interscope. The paid air time was criticized by the media, who saw it as "payola". The band's manager Jeff Kwatinetz later termed the plan as a "brilliant marketing move". Durst stated, "It worked, but it's not that cool of a thing."

Following the release of "Counterfeit" as a single, Three Dollar Bill, Yall was released on July 1, 1997, and was met with minimal response. AllMusic writer Stephen Thomas Erlewine wrote, "They might not have many original ideas ... but they do the sound well. They have a powerful rhythm section and memorable hooks, most of which make up for the uneven songwriting." However, Robert Christgau panned the album. Despite the minimal response to his band's album, Durst was appointed Senior Vice President of A&R at Interscope.

Limp Bizkit joined the Warped Tour, performing alongside the bands Pennywise, Mighty Mighty Bosstones, Sick of It All, Lagwagon, and Blink-182. Preceding the band's first tour with DJ Lethal, Otto became familiar with Lethal's contributions to collaborate with him better on stage. In addition to touring with Primus and Deftones, Limp Bizkit headlined the Ladies Night in Cambodia club tour, which was intended to diversify the band's largely male fanbase by offering free tickets to female attendees. This plan successfully increased the band's female fanbase.

In 1998, Limp Bizkit toured with Soulfly and Cold on Soulfly's first European tour. Touring consistently increased Limp Bizkit's success and the second single from Three Dollar Bill, Y'all, a cover of George Michael's "Faith", became a successful radio hit, leading to a slot on Ozzfest, a tour organized by Ozzy and Sharon Osbourne. In July, Snot singer Lynn Strait was arrested after he emerged nude from Limp Bizkit's prop toilet, and was charged with indecent exposure. Because Limp Bizkit's fans would often break through the barricades, the band was almost kicked off the tour after two days. In August, John Otto spent the night in jail in Auburn Hills, Michigan on a misdemeanor charge of carrying a concealed weapon after allegedly firing a BB gun and being arrested for carrying a switchblade.

After completing Ozzfest, Limp Bizkit took a break from performing and later performed on Korn's Family Values Tour. Durst also directed a music video for the band's single "Faith" in promotion for its appearance in the film Very Bad Things, but was unsatisfied with it and directed a second video which paid tribute to tourmates like Primus, Deftones, and Korn, who appeared in the video. Borland stated in an interview that George Michael, the song's writer, hated the cover and "hates us for doing it".

=== Significant Other (1999–2000) ===
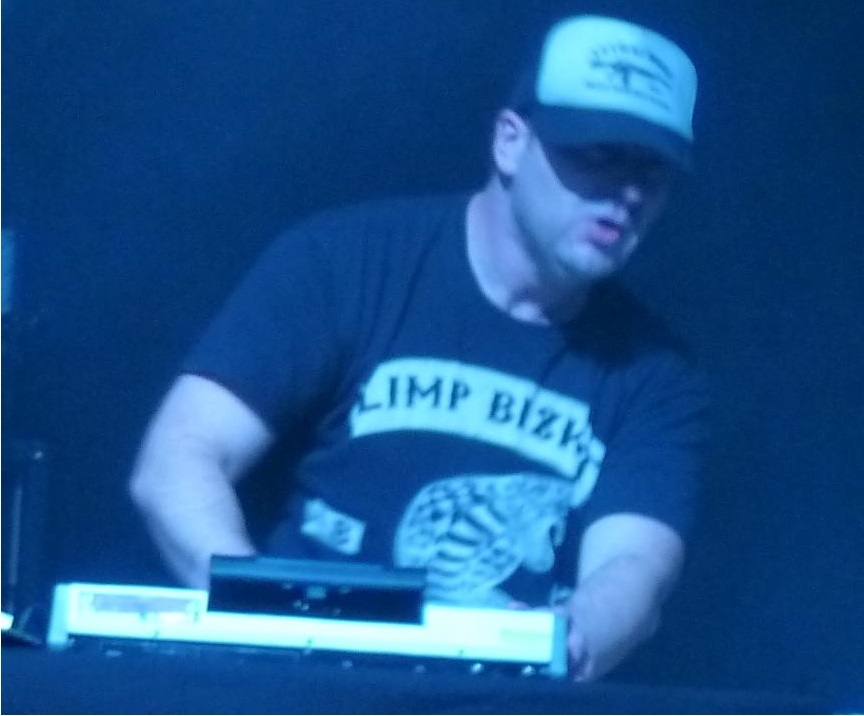
Beginning with Significant Other (1999), DJ Lethal expanded his role as sound designer for the band.

Following the radio success of "Faith", the band was determined to record the follow-up to its first album in order to show that they were not a Korn soundalike or a cover band; the band began writing an album which dealt with issues deriving from its newfound fame. Terry Date, who had produced albums for Pantera, White Zombie and Deftones, was chosen to produce the album. The band allowed Durst and Lethal to explore their hip-hop origins by recording a song with Method Man. The song was originally titled "Shut the Fuck Up", but was retitled "N 2 Gether Now" for marketing purposes. Durst also recorded with Eminem, but the collaboration, "Turn Me Loose", was left off the album. The album also featured guest appearances by Stone Temple Pilots singer Scott Weiland, Korn's Jonathan Davis, Staind singer Aaron Lewis, and interludes by Les Claypool and Matt Pinfield.

Significant Other saw Limp Bizkit reaching a new level of commercial success; the band was featured on the covers of popular music magazines including Spin and now found themselves repeatedly mobbed for autographs; the band was allowed to interact directly with its fans on a website established by Dike 99. Durst also moved from Jacksonville to Los Angeles. Significant Other was seen as an improvement over its debut and was generally well received by critics with mixed-to-positive reviews. However, the band also continued to be criticized by the media; an article profiling the band in Spin and discussing Significant Other claimed that "Limp Bizkit had yet to write a good song", and musicians Marilyn Manson and Trent Reznor criticized the band.

The band promoted the album by playing unannounced concerts in Detroit and Chicago as radio stations received a strong number of requests for the album's first single, "Nookie". Significant Other climbed to No. 1 on the Billboard 200, selling 643,874 copies in its first week of release. In its second week of release the album sold an additional 335,000 copies.

On the opening night of the band's Limptropolis tour with Kid Rock, Sam Rivers smashed his bass in frustration over the venue's poor sound, cutting his hand. After his hand was stitched up at a hospital, Rivers returned to finish the set. On July 12, Durst allegedly kicked a security guard in the head during a performance in St. Paul, Minnesota and was later arrested on assault charges. Further criticisms of the band appeared in Rolling Stone and The New York Times. New York Times writer Ann Powers wrote, "DJ Lethal used his turntables as a metal guitar, riffing expansively and going for effects instead of rhythm. John Otto on drums and Sam Rivers on bass never even tried to get funky, instead steering hip-hop's break-beat-based structure into a backbone for power chords. This makes for a hybrid that would be more interesting if the band did not constantly mire itself in boring tempos, and if Mr. Durst had any talent as a singer".

In the summer of 1999, Limp Bizkit played at the highly anticipated Woodstock '99 show in front of approximately 200,000 people. Violent action sprang up during and after the band's performance, including fans tearing plywood from the walls during a performance of the song "Break Stuff". Several sexual assaults were also reported in the concert's aftermath. Durst stated during the concert, "People are getting hurt. Don't let anybody get hurt. But I don't think you should mellow out. That's what Alanis Morissette had you motherfuckers do. If someone falls, pick 'em up. We already let the negative energy out. Now we wanna let out the positive energy". Durst later stated in an interview, "I didn't see anybody getting hurt. You don't see that. When you're looking out on a sea of people and the stage is twenty feet in the air and you're performing, and you're feeling your music, how do they expect us to see something bad going on?" Les Claypool told The San Francisco Examiner, "Woodstock was just Durst being Durst. His attitude is 'no press is bad press', so he brings it on himself. He wallows in it. Still, he's a great guy." Jonathan Davis of Korn also defended the band: "I think Bizkit is being blamed for it because they were the heavy band … I don't think it was their fuckin' fault". "It's easy to point the finger and blame [us], but they hired us for what we do — and all we did is what we do. I would turn the finger and point it back to the people that hired us," said Durst in reference to original Woodstock co-founder Michael Lang.

Durst saw the band as being scapegoated for the event's controversy, and reflected on the criticisms surrounding the band in his music video for the single "Re-Arranged", which depicted the band members receiving death sentences for their participation in the concerts. The video ended with angry witnesses watching as the band drowned in milk while performing the song. Durst later stated that the promoters of Woodstock '99 were at fault for booking his band due to their reputation for raucous performances.

Despite this controversy, Significant Other remained at No. 1 on the Billboard charts; the band also headlined the year's Family Values Tour. Durst directed a music video for "N 2 Gether Now" which featured Method Man and Pauly Shore, and was inspired by Inspector Clouseau's fights with his butler Cato Fong in the Pink Panther film series.

=== Chocolate Starfish and the Hot Dog Flavored Water (2000–2001) ===
In 2000, Durst announced that the band's third studio album would be titled Chocolate Starfish and the Hot Dog Flavored Water. The press thought he was joking about this title. The album title is intended to sound like a fictional band; the phrase "Chocolate Starfish" refers to the human anus and Durst himself, who has frequently been called an "asshole". Borland contributed the other half of the album's title when the band was standing around at a truck stop looking at bottles of flavored water, and Borland joked that the truck stop did not have hot dog or meat-flavored water.

In June 2000, Limp Bizkit performed at the WXRK Dysfunctional Family Picnic, but showed up an hour late for their set. An Interscope spokesman stated that there was confusion over the band's set time. During the band's performance, Durst criticized Creed singer Scott Stapp, calling him "an egomaniac". Creed's representatives later presented Durst with an autographed anger management manual.

In the summer, Limp Bizkit's tour was sponsored by the controversial file sharing service Napster, doing free shows with a metal cage as the only thing separating them from the audience. Durst was an outspoken advocate of file sharing. They also did a "Guerrilla Tour", which involved the band setting up illegal and impromptu public gigs on rooftops and alleyways, some being shut down by the police.

During the 2000 MTV Video Music Awards, Durst performed "Livin' It Up", a song from the upcoming album, as a duet with Christina Aguilera. In response to the performance, Filter frontman Richard Patrick was quoted as saying "Fred getting onstage with Christina Aguilera embarrassed us all." In response to the negative reactions to the performance, Durst remarked, "People always just wanna talk about Britney or Christina. What's the problem? Because they make a type of music we aren't allowed to like? Or you think they are the nemesis of what our music is about? Why segregate? Why be so musically fuckin' racist? What do you mean, I can't hang out with these types of people? Clearly I didn't give a fuck, which fed a lot of it, too. I mean, someone that's not going to give in and apologise... it's gonna make people carry on talking".

Durst also appeared in the music video for Eminem's song "The Real Slim Shady", a song in which Eminem suggests that Christina Aguilera and Durst had a sexual relationship. Durst denied the rumors and defended Aguilera, saying: "For one thing, it's not true, so it doesn't bother me. [Eminem is] sort of answering the critics. He's going to the extreme with everything he can to now slap them in the face.... It's so over-the-top. For one thing, Christina's amazing. I really like that girl. I think she's an amazing singer. She's gonna have longevity. She's going to be one of those amazing icon women. I'm really attracted to her, I like her, and I've talked to her a couple of times, and that's that. I haven't had any type of relationship with her, or any type of intercourse with her. She's never sucked my dick, she's never sucked Carson's."

Released on October 17, Chocolate Starfish and the Hot Dog Flavored Water set a record for highest first-week sales for a rock album, with over one million copies sold in the US in its first week of release. 400,000 of those sales happened during the first day, making it the fastest-selling rock album ever and breaking the record held for seven years by Pearl Jam's Vs. Chocolate Starfish and the Hot Dog Flavored Water was certified Gold, Platinum, and six times Multi-Platinum.

The album received mixed reviews, with AllMusic's Stephen Thomas Erlewine writing, "Durst's self-pitying and the monotonous music give away that the band bashed Chocolate Starfish out very quickly – it's the sound of a band determined to deliver a sequel in a finite amount of time." Entertainment Weekly writer David Browne named it as the worst album title of 2000, whilst readers of Kerrang! magazine voted it the worst album of the year, as well as voting Limp Bizkit and Fred Durst as the worst band of 2000 and the "Arse of the Year", respectively.

During a 2001 tour of Australia at the Big Day Out festival in Sydney, fans rushed the stage in the mosh pit and teenager Jessica Michalik died of asphyxiation. In court, Durst, represented by long-time attorney Ed McPherson, testified he had warned the concert's organizers Aaron Jackson, Will Pearce, and Amar Tailor, as well as the concert's promoter Vivian Lees, of the potential dangers of such minimal security. After viewing videotapes and hearing witness testimony, however, the coroner said it was evident that the crowd's density was dangerous at the time Limp Bizkit took the stage, stating that Fred Durst should have acted more responsibly when the problem became apparent. Durst stated that he was "emotionally scarred" because of the teenager's death. Durst also stated that he was aware of the security problems, but that he and the band were forced to play in the festival: "There was a demand for us to play Big Day Out 2001, so we filled it. When we came to play we said, "The barricades aren't right – people are gonna go crazy so we're not playing." And they go, "No, you're goddamn wrong. You are playing – you're the headliners." And we go, "No, you gotta have the right barricade." The promoters who owned Big Day Out at the time were rude. The police came and it turned into this huge thing, with them telling us, "There's gonna be a riot if you don't play and if that happens, we're arresting you".

Later in 2001, numerous hip-hop artists including P. Diddy, Timbaland, Bubba Sparxxx, and Everlast remixed famous songs from the band into hip-hop versions, adding their own styles and modifications. The album was called New Old Songs.

=== Departure of Borland and Results May Vary (2001–2003) ===
In October 2001, Durst released a statement on their website stating that "Limp Bizkit and Wes Borland have amicably decided to part ways. Both Limp Bizkit and Borland will continue to pursue their respective musical careers. Both wish each other the best of luck in all future endeavors." Durst also stated that the band would "comb the world for the illest guitar player known to man" to replace Borland. When asked why Borland quit the band, Ross Robinson stated that he quit because "He doesn't sell out for money anymore".

Durst held a nationwide audition for a new guitarist called "Put Your Guitar Where Your Mouth Is." However, Mike Henderson, who was one of the guitarists who went for the audition, revealed that the event was nothing more than a publicity stunt. Durst had no intention to recruit a new guitarist and the whole thing was intended to sell Guitar Center products. This caused an uproar amongst the guitarists who had been waiting for hours. The band eventually recorded with Snot guitarist Mike Smith, though they later scrapped the initial recording sessions with Smith. In May 2002, Durst posted Wes Borland's personal email address online and told fans to ask him to rejoin the group. Borland stated that 75% or more of all the emails pleaded for him not to return to the band.

During the album's production, the working title changed from Bipolar to Panty Sniffer, and was completed under the title Results May Vary. Under Durst's sole leadership, the album encompassed a variety of styles and featured a cover of the Who's "Behind Blue Eyes", which differed from the original's arrangement in its inclusion of a Speak & Spell during the song's bridge. Results May Vary consisted of various recording sessions, some of which included Smith on guitars and some without; however, Smith continued to play live shows with the band.

Limp Bizkit performed at WWE WrestleMania XIX, with both Smith and Korn's Brian Welch on guitars. In the summer of 2003, Limp Bizkit participated on the Summer Sanitarium Tour headlined by Metallica. At the tour's Chicago stop, concert attendees threw items and heckled Durst from the moment he walked on stage. With the crowd chanting "Fuck Fred Durst" and continuing their assault on him, Durst threw the mic down after six songs and walked off stage, but not before heckling the crowd back. He repeatedly said, "Limp Bizkit are the best band in the world!" until a roadie took his microphone away. An article in the Sun-Times stated that the hostility was started by radio personality Mancow.

Results May Vary was released on September 23, 2003, and received largely unfavorable reviews. AllMusic reviewer Stephen Thomas Erlewine panned the album, writing, "the music has no melody, hooks, or energy, [and] all attention is focused on the clown jumping up and down and screaming in front, and long before the record is over, you're left wondering, how the hell did he ever get to put this mess out?" The Guardian reviewer Caroline Sullivan wrote, "At least Limp Bizkit can't be accused of festering in the rap-rock ghetto ... But Durst's problems are ever-present – and does anybody still care?" Despite criticisms of the album, it was a commercial success, peaking at No. 3 on the Billboard 200. Smith departed from the band in August 2004. Durst later told a fan site that he had a falling-out with Smith, saying "We are the type of people that stay true to our family and our instincts and at any moment will act on intuition as a whole. Mike wasn't the guy. We had fun playing with him but always knew, in the back of our minds, that he wasn't where we needed him to be mentally."

=== Borland's return, The Unquestionable Truth (Part 1) and hiatus (2004–2008) ===
In August 2004, Borland rejoined Limp Bizkit, which began recording their first EP, The Unquestionable Truth (Part 1).

In May, The Unquestionable Truth (Part 1) was released. Sammy Siegler took over drumming duties for the band for much of the EP, which featured a more experimental sound, described by AllMusic writer Stephen Thomas Erlewine as "neo-prog alt-metal". At Durst's insistence, the EP was released as an underground release without any advertising or promotion. Borland disagreed with the decision, suggesting that it was "self-sabotage": "Maybe he was already unhappy with the music, and he didn't really want to put it out there."

The EP received mixed reviews. Stephen Thomas Erlewine praised the music, calling it "a step in the right direction – it's more ambitious, dramatic, and aggressive, built on pummeling verses and stop-start choruses." However, he felt that the band was being "held back" by Durst, whom he called "the most singularly unpleasant, absurd frontman in rock." IGN writer Spence D. similarly gave it a mixed review, as he felt that the EP lacked direction, but that showed potential for the band's musical growth.

The Unquestionable Truth (Part 1) sold over 37,000 copies in its first week of release, and debuted at No. 24 on the Billboard 200, but due to its lack of advertising sales fell off quickly and only sold 88,000 copies in the United States by March 2006. Following the release of the band's Greatest Hitz album, the band went on hiatus. Borland stated that it was unlikely that a sequel to The Unquestionable Truth would be produced and that "As of right now, none of my future plans include Limp Bizkit."

=== Reunion, Gold Cobra and departure from Interscope (2009–2011) ===
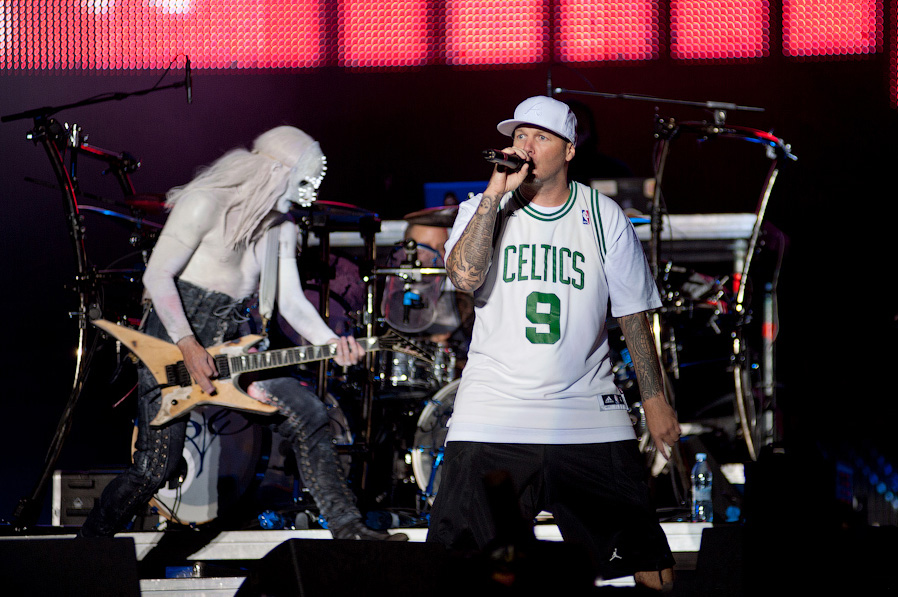
Borland, Otto (background) and Durst performing live (2012)

In 2009, Limp Bizkit reunited with Borland playing guitar and launched the Unicorns N' Rainbows Tour. Durst announced that they had begun to record a new album, which Borland titled Gold Cobra. Borland said that the title does not have any meaning, and that it was chosen because it fit the style of music the band was writing for the album. The band recorded a spoken intro written by Durst and performed by Kiss member Gene Simmons for the album, but it was left off the completed album. The band also recorded additional "non-album" tracks, including "Combat Jazz", which featured rapper Raekwon and "Middle Finger", featuring Paul Wall.

"Shotgun" was released as a single on May 17, 2011. The song is noted for featuring a guitar solo by Borland, something that the band is not known for. "Shotgun" received favorable reviews, with Artistdirect writing, "['Shotgun'] feels like Bizkit approached the signature style on Three Dollar Bill Y'All and Significant Other with another decade-plus of instrumental experience and virtuosity, carving out a banger that could get asses moving in the club or fists flying in the mosh pit."

Gold Cobra was released on June 28 and received mixed to positive reviews. AllMusic's Stephen Thomas Erlewine called it "a return to the full-throttled attack of Three Dollar Bill Y'All. IGN writer Chad Grischow wrote, "Though far from their best work, Limp Bizkit's latest at least proves that their 2005 Greatest Hitz album may have been premature." Metal Hammer writer Terry Bezer appraised the album, writing "Aside from the odd duff moment, Gold Cobra throws out the hot shit that'll make you bounce in the mosh pit over and over again." The band launched the Gold Cobra Tour in support of the album. A music video for the title track was released. Gold Cobra sold nearly 80,000 copies in the United States alone and peaked at No. 16 on the Billboard 200; however, the band left Interscope after the album's release.

=== Stampede of the Disco Elephants and Still Sucks (2012–2022) ===
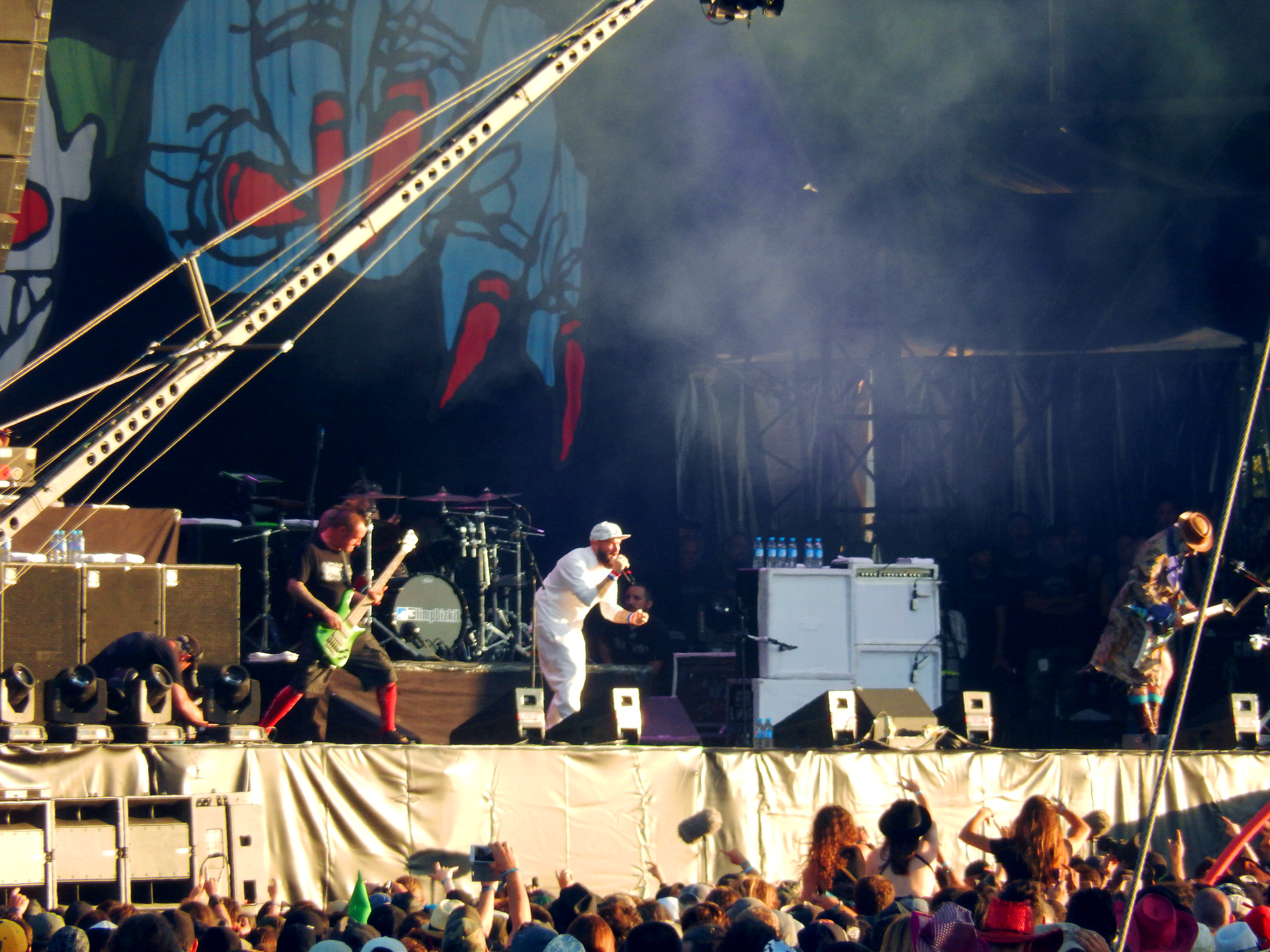
Limp Bizkit performing at Hellfest in 2015

In February 2012, the band returned to Australia for the first time in 11 years to perform at the Soundwave festival. Durst dedicated the shows to Jessica Michalik, who died during the Limp Bizkit performance at Big Day Out 2001. Limp Bizkit signed with Cash Money Records. Following a dispute between Durst, Lethal, and Otto about the latter two's alleged chronic drug and alcohol use, DJ Lethal angrily left the band. DJ Lethal later posted an apology to the band on Twitter, but was ultimately not allowed back into the band.

Fred Durst was featured in the song "Champions" by Kevin Rudolf, which was used as a theme for WWE's Night of Champions. The song debuted on WWE Raw on September 3, 2012. This was the first time Limp Bizkit has worked with WWE since 2003.

He's been in and out and in and out. I know what he wants to do but don't know what he would do if he came back into the band. He's kind of all over the place, and I don't know if he wants to be in the band. When we had him back, nothing materialized as far as material coming out of him to add to the record. We're talking to him. We've opened up dialogue back with him recently, and we'll see what happens.

— Wes Borland on the band's relationship with DJ Lethal

The band recorded their seventh studio album, Stampede of the Disco Elephants with producer Ross Robinson, who also produced the band's debut album Three Dollar Bill, Yall and the 2005 EP The Unquestionable Truth (Part 1).

On March 24, 2013, the first single from the album, "Ready to Go" (featuring Lil Wayne) was released on limpbizkit.com. In November a cover of the Ministry song "Thieves" was released by the band via their official Facebook and Twitter accounts. In December, the band released the previously leaked song "Lightz" along with an accompanying music video. The next single off the album, "Endless Slaughter", was set to be released only on cassette and during concerts, but can be downloaded at the band's official website.

In October 2014, Fred Durst revealed that the band had left Cash Money and became independent again. The split was carried out amicably and Fred says that "We really love the jam we did with Lil Wayne, though. We love that song."

Limp Bizkit performed as headliners of the ShipRocked 2015 cruise from February 2 to 6. Other bands present were Chevelle, Black Label Society, P.O.D., and Sevendust among others. The band announced their major 2015 tour called "Money Sucks", a Russian 20-date tour to take place during October and November celebrating Limp Bizkit's 20th anniversary. The tour name was a nod to the difficult economic situation that Russia was facing at the time. The tour gathered criticism on the background of the Russo-Ukrainian War and Durst's behavior, who was shown in a picture that had surfaced during the tour, holding a flag saying "Crimea = Russia" in reference to the illegal annexation by Russia.

Before the band traveled to Europe to attend the "Money Sucks" Tour, Sam Rivers was diagnosed with a degenerative disease of the spinal discs that was complicated due to a pinched nerve, causing a lot of pain in such areas and which prevented him from being with the band. 23-year-old German bassist Samuel Gerhard Mpungu replaced Rivers for the tour.

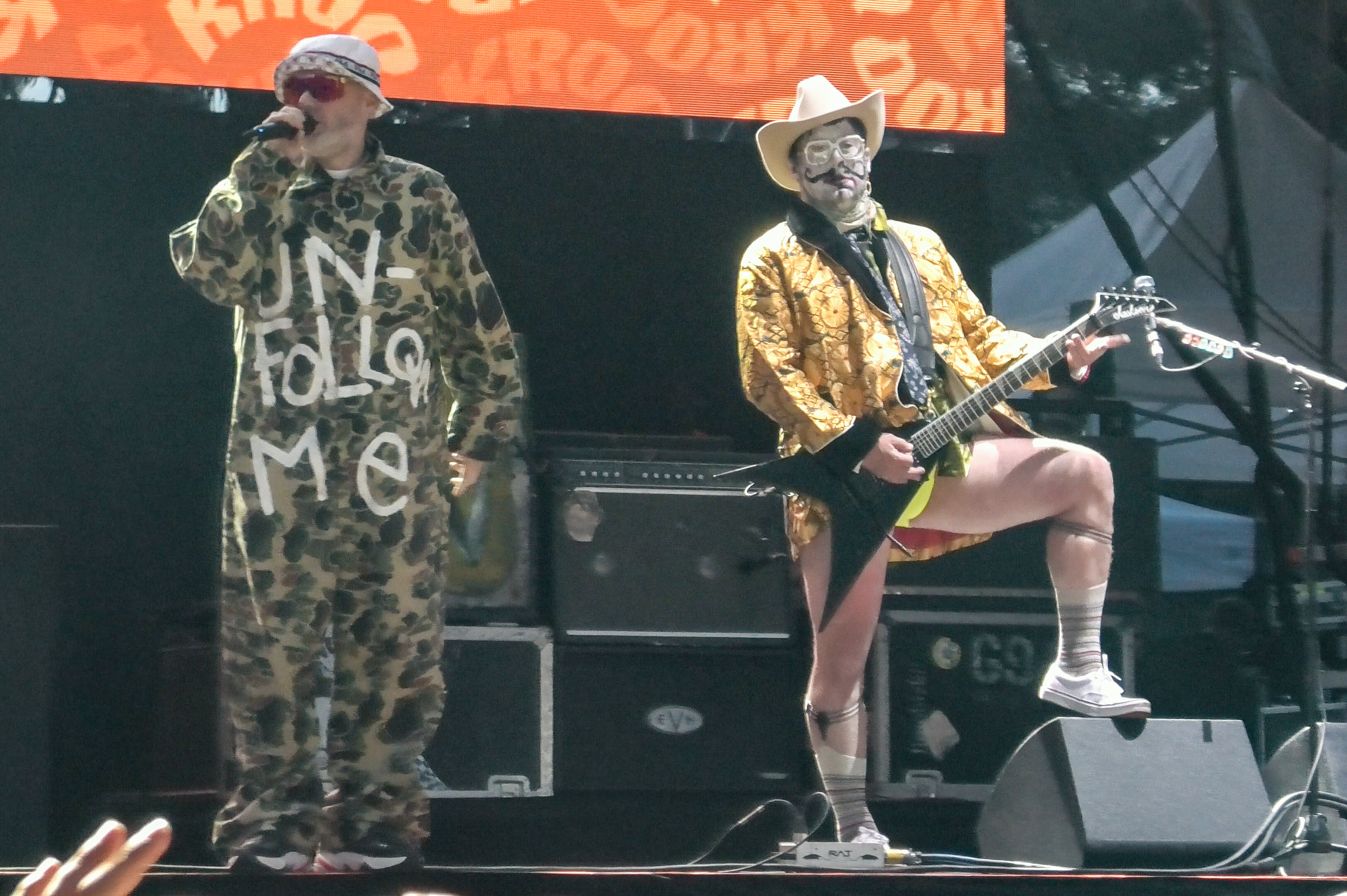
Fred Durst and Wes Borland performing at KROQ Weenie Roast 2019

Limp Bizkit offered several concerts in the United Kingdom during winter 2016 alongside Korn. Regarding this tour, Fred says: "You may have experienced a lot of cool concerts in your life, but I can guarantee you that an evening with Korn and Limp Bizkit will always and forever be your favorite. No one brings the party harder, heavier, and more exciting than us. No one. And ... make sure you get plenty of rest the night before. It's time to bring it back!" Because of little information and constant delays for the release of Stampede, in an interview/talk with the podcast "Someone Who Isn't Me", Wes said that Fred "isn't happy" with what he was working on. The guitarist said that Durst will "just keep working on something until he's happy with it, even if it takes years and years".

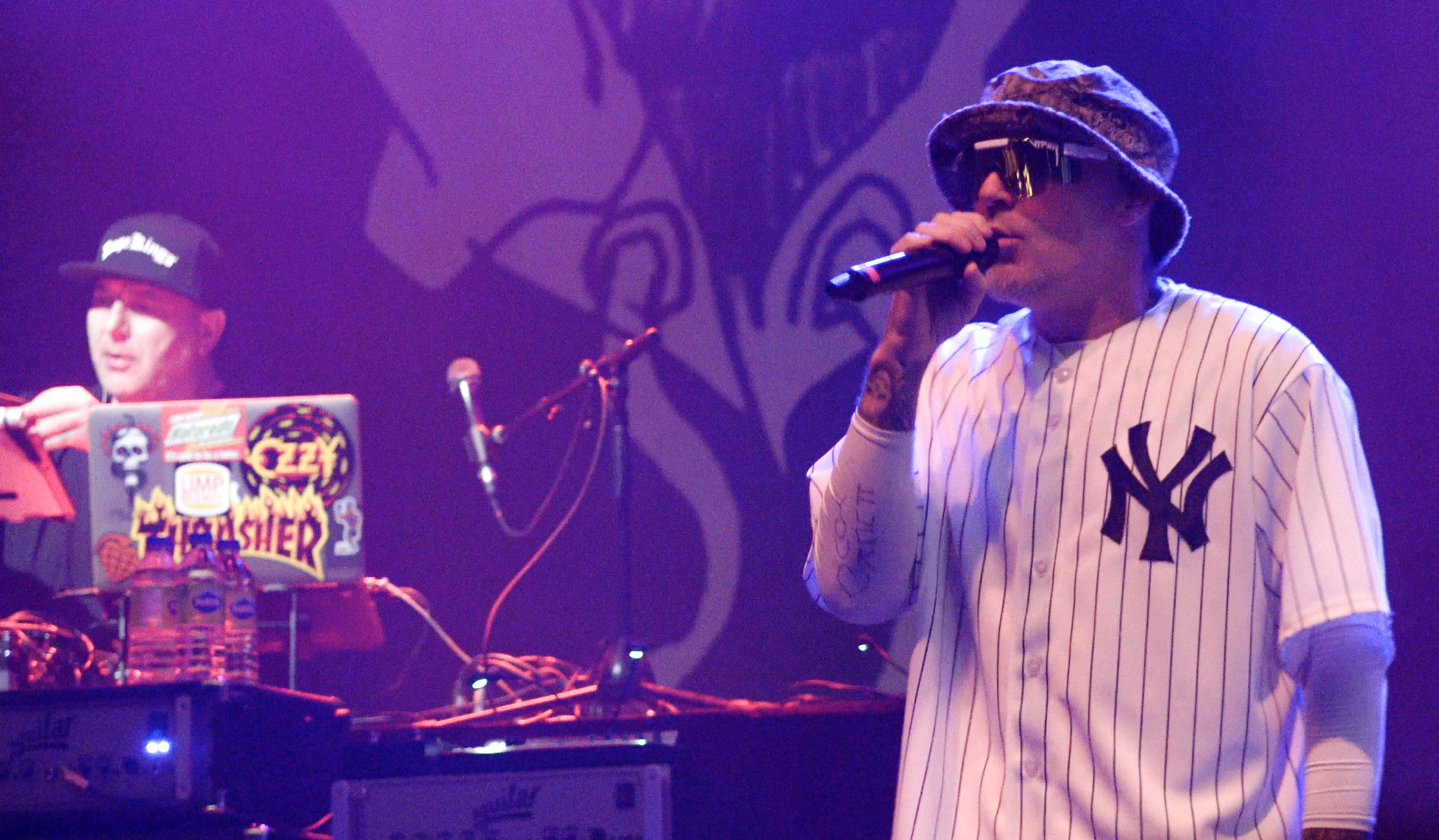
DJ Lethal and Fred Durst performing at Quebec Agora Fest 2019

DJ Lethal resumed performing with the band on March 17, 2018, at the Storm the Gates festival in Auckland, New Zealand. The band again played on the Vans Warped Tour in 2018. On July 8, 2019, the band played a new song from their forthcoming album called "Wasteoid" live in Paris.

Borland provided an album update in June 2021, detailing the struggles with the album:

We've probably, in the last 10 years, been in the studio to try and complete the record, I wanna say, seven times, to different studios. And we've been working on stuff, working on stuff, working on stuff. And Fred [Durst] has been consistently kind of unsatisfied with where vision is, I guess...We probably have 35 songs recorded instrumentally, and he's done vocals on them and then thrown the vocals away — done vocals and then [gone], 'Fuck this,' [and] thrown it away. So I think he's finally at the point now where he's gonna pick a set of these songs that he's finally cool with and finish 'em and we're gonna finish the record. So, fingers crossed."

In August 2021, just a week after their main stage set at Lollapalooza, the band canceled their summer tour, "out of an abundance of caution and concern for the safety of the band, crew and most of all the fans" in relation to rising COVID-19 cases in the United States.

On August 25, 2021, the band revealed new music would be "leaked" in rapid succession with their new album to follow soon after.

On September 30, 2021, the band released a new single "Dad Vibes". On October 19, Durst teased on Instagram that more songs would be coming soon, revealing the titles "Turn It Up Bitch" and "Goodbye", as well as the album containing 12 tracks. On October 28, 2021, Durst confirmed via Instagram that the band's sixth album – now titled Still Sucks – would be released on October 31, 2021.

=== Upcoming seventh studio album and Sam Rivers' death (2023–present) ===
Borland revealed in early 2023 that plans for Limp Bizkit's seventh studio album were underway for 2024. In late October 2024, Durst confirmed that he was "in the studio with John Otto" recording drum tracks for the album. The band's first song in four years was initially teased in a staged partial leak on Instagram, and released on September 12, 2025, entitled "Making Love to Morgan Wallen", as part of the soundtrack for the video game Battlefield 6. They also contributed the song "Battlefield: The After-party" (a reimagining of the traditional Battlefield theme) to the soundtrack, and their 2000 single "Break Stuff" to the game's trailer.

On October 8, 2024, Limp Bizkit, Durst, and his record label Flawless Records sued Universal Music Group in federal district court, alleging that it owed them over $200 million in unpaid royalties from record sales, online streams, and music videos derived from their master recordings, and failed to provide royalty statements between 1997 and 2004. UMG filed a motion to dismiss on November 22.

On March 17, 2025, judge Percy Anderson dismissed 14 of the claims against UMG, including for breach of contract, fraudulent concealment, and rescission of the record contracts, ruling that they must be adjudicated in California and New York state courts. However, he allowed the band's federal copyright infringement claim to continue.

Bassist Sam Rivers, who last performed with Limp Bizkit at the August 2025 Leeds Festival in the United Kingdom, died on October 18, 2025 at the age of 48.

On November 29, 2025, Limp Bizkit performed their first concert in Mexico City without their original bassist, with Richie Buxton, from Ecca Vandal, taking the place of Rivers.

In February 2026, the band was confirmed to be among the headlining acts for Louder Than Life festival taking place in Louisville in September, along with Iron Maiden, My Chemical Romance and Tool.

== Artistry ==
=== Music ===
"Counterfeit" by Limp Bizkit
"Counterfeit", which appears on the band's 1997 debut, Three Dollar Bill, Yall, is noted for "kinetic, frenzied energy" and a mix of music styles.

Durst wanted Limp Bizkit to be a "megaband" which could cross over into as many different styles of music as possible. Limp Bizkit's music has predominately been described as nu metal, rap metal and rap rock. Limp Bizkit have also been described as alternative metal, alternative rock, post-grunge and hard rock. In 2000, the New York Daily News labelled the band as "frat-metal".

Limp Bizkit's music is noted for its "kinetic, frenzied energy". Otto is adept in drumming in a variety of styles ranging from Brazilian and Afro-Cuban music to bebop and funk. DJ Lethal functions as a sound designer for the band, shaping their sound. According to Lethal, "I try and bring new sounds, not just the regular chirping scratching sounds. ... It's all different stuff that you haven't heard before. I'm trying to be like another guitar player." Borland's guitar playing is experimental and nontraditional, and he is noted for his creative use of six and seven-string guitars. Three Dollar Bill, Yall features him playing without a guitar pick, performing with two hands, one playing melodic notes, and the other playing chord progressions. His guitar playing has made use of octave shapes, and choppy, eighth-note rhythms, sometimes accompanied by muting his strings with his left hand, creating a percussive sound. Borland has also made use of unevenly accented syncopated sixteenth notes to create a disorienting effect, and hypnotic, droning licks. The song "Stuck" uses a sustain pedal in the first bar, and muted riffs in the second bar.

AllMusic writer Stephen Thomas Erlewine said that the band's album Significant Other contains "flourishes of neo-psychedelia on pummeling metal numbers" and "swirls of strings, even crooning, at the most unexpected background". The band did not employ solos until Gold Cobra (except for the song "Underneath the Gun" from Results May Vary), however, during the recording of Significant Other, drummer John Otto performed an extended solo in the middle of the song "Nobody Like You". A drum solo can also be heard on "9 Teen 90 Nine" from the same album.

=== Lyrics ===
Durst's lyrics are often profane, scatological or angry. Much of Durst's lyrical inspiration came from growing up and his personal life. The song "Sour", from the album Three Dollar Bill, Yall, was inspired by Durst's problems with his girlfriend. His breakup with her inspired the Significant Other songs "Nookie" and "Re-Arranged". When describing Limp Bizkit's lyrics, The Michigan Daily said "In a less-serious vein, Limp Bizkit used the nu-metal sound as a way to spin testosterone fueled fantasies into snarky white-boy rap. Oddly, audiences took frontman Fred Durst more seriously than he wanted, failing to see the intentional silliness in many of his songs." Durst said that people failed to understand the band's proposal, "There was always a lot of pain in my life. Mental and physical abuse happens regularly in my life. I've been bullied my whole life, but I also love having fun and getting crazy and being silly and outrageous. We always had that in our band and a lot of people didn't understand that." Durst also said that the band's purpose was to serve as a satire but "We just didn't make it that obvious." The band's guitarist, Wes Borland, said that "Limp Bizkit is definitely a dumb rock band." Limp Bizkit's lyrics have also been described as "misogynistic". In response to these accusations, Durst said: "That's because I said the words whore and bitch. My whole record is about my girlfriend who put me through the ringer [sic] for three years and my insecurity about it. It became this big thing." The Baltimore Sun talked about the band's song "Nookie", which is accused of being sexist and misogynistic, "Despite its seemingly salacious title, 'Nookie' is not about the joy of sex; instead, it finds singer Fred Durst talking about how he let his girlfriend take advantage of him because he was a fool for love. So when he gets to the chorus catch-phrase - 'I did it all for the nookie' - what we hear is more self-recrimination than boast." The Unquestionable Truth (Part 1) focuses on more serious and darker lyrical subject matter, including Catholic sex abuse cases, terrorism and fame.

=== Live performances ===
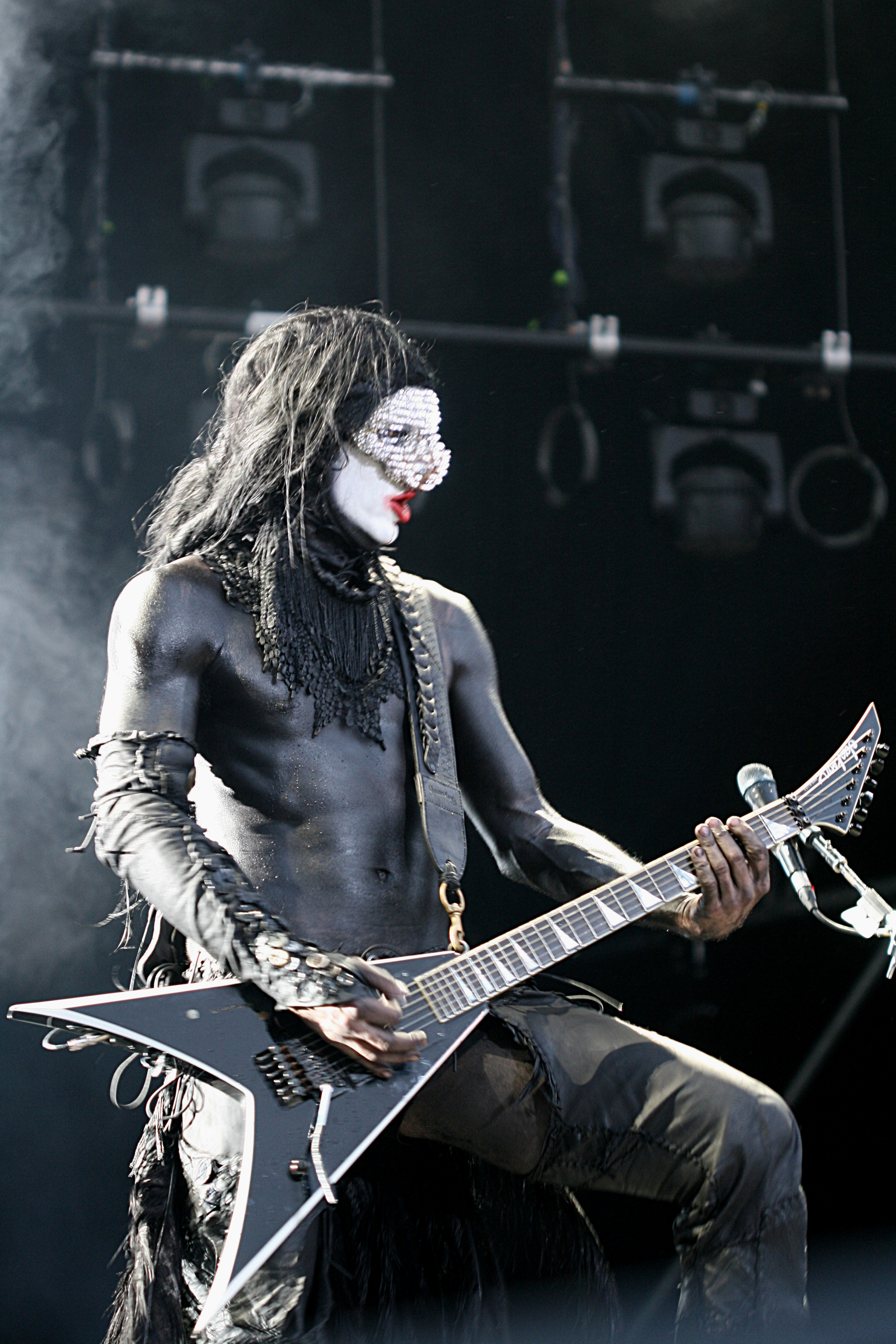
Guitarist Wes Borland is known for his visual performance style, and often performs wearing costumes or body paint.

Guitarist Wes Borland is known for his use of costumes and body paint during concerts, appearing in bunny and kung fu suits, and painted as a skeleton and what he describes as a "burnt match". Describing the character, he stated, "I go onstage wearing almost nothing. I have underwear and my boots on, and I paint my whole head black—from the neck up—and I have the black contacts. All you can see is these glowing teeth." Borland's black contacts were customized for him by a company noted for making contacts for the science fiction TV series Babylon 5.

In addition to Borland's visual appearance, the band has also used elaborate stage setups in their performances. Their Ladies Night in Cambodia club tour visually paid tribute to the film Apocalypse Now, with an elaborate stage setup which featured an empty Jeep, camouflage mesh and palm trees. During the band's tour with Primus, Limp Bizkit took inspiration from Primus' trademark self-deprecatory slogan "Primus sucks": Durst, Borland, Rivers, Otto and Lethal took the stage with middle fingers raised. According to Borland, "they finger us back—and you know what that means to us—that they love us. It's kind of like saying something is bad when you really mean good. Les Claypool came out the first night of the tour and got a big kick out of it. We figured it was the right idea. It makes hecklers go 'huh.'"

During the band's sets at Ozzfest, audience members at the tour heckled Limp Bizkit, leading the band to use a 30-foot (9.1 m) toilet as a stage prop, which they would emerge from during each performance; the band punctuated their sets by "flushing" cardboard cutouts of pop stars like Hanson and the Spice Girls. During their appearance at the first Family Values Tour, Limp Bizkit performed on a set which the Los Angeles Times described as "a mix of The War of the Worlds and Mars Attacks". The band emerged from a spaceship during the tour, and Borland continued to experiment with visual appearances. During the band's Halloween performance on the tour, each of the band's members dressed as Elvis Presley at various stages in his career.

=== Influences ===
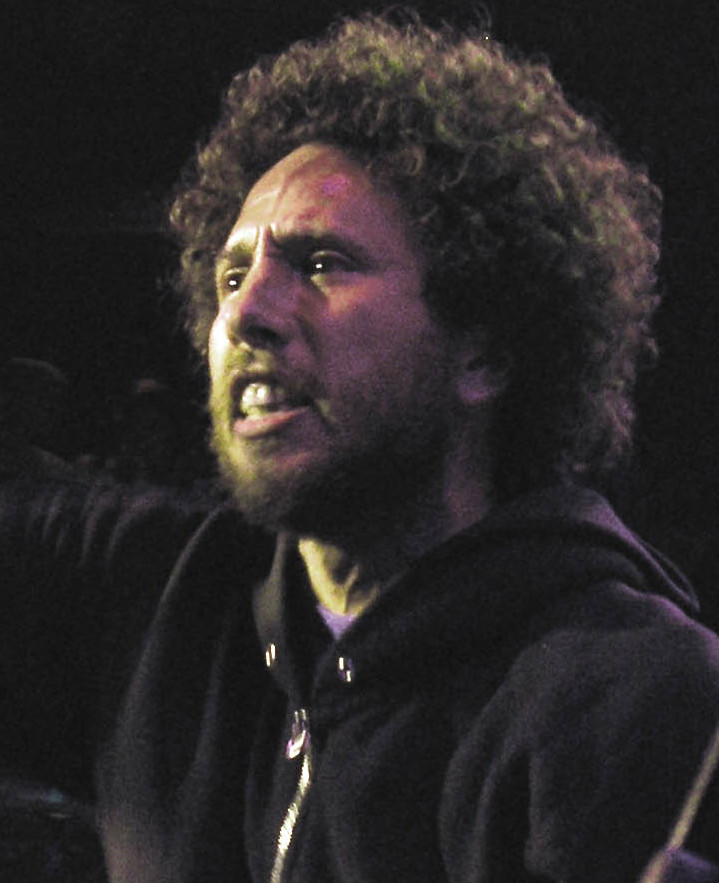
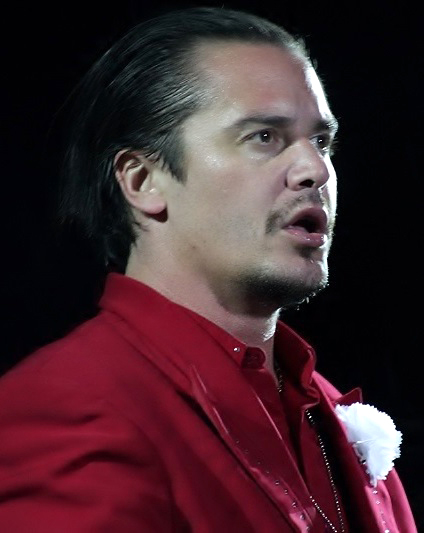
Rage Against the Machine's Zack de la Rocha (left) and Faith No More's Mike Patton (right) were major influences on Fred Durst.

Limp Bizkit cites their inspirations and influences as such acts as Metallica, Faith No More, the Red Hot Chili Peppers, Run-DMC, the Beastie Boys, Public Enemy, the Jesus Lizard, Tomahawk, Dave Matthews Band, Portishead, Mr. Bungle, Sepultura, Ministry, Prong, Tool, Primus, Pantera, Anthrax, Testament, Suicidal Tendencies, Minor Threat, the Angry Samoans, Black Flag, N.W.A, the Fat Boys, the Treacherous Three, the Cold Crush Brothers, Urban Dance Squad, Rage Against the Machine, Korn, Deftones, Jane's Addiction, the Circle Jerks, and John Zorn.

=== Criticism ===
Despite receiving praise for their artistry and musical contributions, the band has received a share of negative criticism from fellow musicians. As pointed out by author Joel McIver, Limp Bizkit's mix of rap and metal was notably preceded by the bands Rage Against the Machine and Faith No More, but its lyrics widely differed from the radical politics of the former and the existential poetry of the latter. Durst cited both bands as two of his biggest influences. Faith No More's semi-ironic cover of "Easy" by the Commodores in 1992 hinted what would be the recording of George Michael's "Faith" by Limp Bizkit in 1997. The frontmen of both groups have distanced themselves from Limp Bizkit; Zack de la Rocha of Rage Against the Machine stated that Limp Bizkit "sucks", while Faith No More vocalist Mike Patton paraphrased the quote attributed to Götz von Berlichingen, Er kann mich am Arsch lecken – "He can lick my ass", when asked by a German reporter about Durst's interest in releasing his music through Interscope Records. During the 2000 MTV Video Music Awards, Rage Against the Machine bassist Tim Commerford climbed part of the set in protest of Limp Bizkit winning the award for Best Rock Video, later expressing his dislike of the band during a 2015 interview with Rolling Stone, claiming "I apologize for inspiring such shit".

== Feuds ==
=== Slipknot ===
Korn and Limp Bizkit shared a long-standing friendship after their original bassist Reginald Arvizu assisted the latter in acquiring a record deal in 1996. The bands continued to strengthen their relationship as they often toured together frequently throughout the late 1990s. Slipknot at the time was an up-and-coming band and would have its self-titled debut produced by Ross Robinson (a producer who worked with all three bands). While on tour promoting their upcoming album during the 1999 Ozzfest tour, lead singer Corey Taylor took notice of Korn's then-drummer David Silveria's modeling campaign for Calvin Klein in several magazines while the band was at a truck stop in Texas. Disgusted with Silveria's business decisions to expand into modeling, Taylor purchased numerous copies of the magazine issue and publicly burned copies onstage during Slipknot's live performances. According to Taylor, Durst and DJ Lethal were enraged by this and attacked Slipknot in various interviews in the spring of 1999. Taylor admits that he and multiple Slipknot members were impressed with Limp Bizkit's 1997 debut record, even citing it as an influence on their debut album, but he later claimed they lost respect for the band following the release of Significant Other in 1999, accusing the band of selling out. Durst would make further retaliatory comments towards Slipknot's fans in December 1999, referring to them as "fat, ugly kids". Slipknot singer Corey Taylor responded during a February 2000 fan interview in Sydney, Australia by claiming that the fans of Slipknot "for the most part, enjoy all kinds of music, like Limp Bizkit… maybe." Taylor went on to claim that insulting fans of Slipknot could also be insulting fans of Limp Bizkit. During an interview with VH1 in October 2000, Durst praised Slipknot's music, expressing his desire to quell the tension between both sides. When asked about Slipknot's music Durst told reporters: "Man this band is super phat, man; we don't even know them. That's their whole thing, that's their chant, that's their thing, that's cool. Maybe all this hate that's going around the world, that's why I said 'It's all the world has even seen lately'". Despite this, Taylor retorted with praise for Durst's financial ventures but attacked his artistic motives, claiming "Fred Durst is a great businessman, but he is not an artist". Despite the attacks between the two bands, they shared numerous UK festival dates together through 2000, including the 2000 Reading and Leeds Festivals.

Taylor later claimed that feud began to subside during the late 2000s after the two bands shared a friendly encounter during the 2009 Download Festival in which Durst approached him, informing Taylor that his children were fans of Slipknot's music. Durst asked Taylor if he would sign several autographs for his son, to which Taylor kindly obliged. The two would continue to find themselves on friendlier terms in 2010. While Limp Bizkit was recording "Gold Cobra", Durst included a line on the song 90.2.10 giving a shoutout to Taylor. Limp Bizkit was later booked on the 2014 Japanese leg of Slipknot's Knotfest tour along with Korn.

In August 2021, Limp Bizkit gave a public tribute to Slipknot drummer Joey Jordison who had recently died on July 26. Durst and the band paid tribute to him during their concert in Des Moines, Iowa (Slipknot's hometown). Durst asked the audience: "Slipknot's from somewhere around here, aren't they?" before expressing support for Jordison and the rest of the band, later telling the crowd "Rest in peace, let's hear it! That's beautiful. Life is short and it's always fleeting so, man, let's just remember all we are is right now" while riling the crowd to chant Jordison's name. On May 19, 2024, former Slipknot turntablist Sid Wilson made a live appearance during Limp Bizkit's performance at that year's Sonic Temple festival in Columbus, Ohio.

=== Marilyn Manson and Trent Reznor ===
Marilyn Manson was known to be overly vocal against Limp Bizkit's music; in 1999, he attacked the band's artistry and their fans, referring to them as "illiterate apes that beat your ass in high school for being a 'fag' and now sell you tuneless testosterone anthems of misogyny and pretend to be outsiders...". Manson, along with Nine Inch Nails frontman Trent Reznor, once again took aim at Durst and the band in Nine Inch Nails' video for the song "Starfuckers, Inc.", in which the two take aim at multiple artists, ranging from The Smashing Pumpkins' frontman Billy Corgan, Michael Stipe of R.E.M., and (most blatantly) Durst and Limp Bizkit. In a 2000 interview, Manson later explained: "With this video, we didn't wanna seem bitching like about somehow that Limp Bizkit's doing better than we are, in their mind." Reznor later added to the comment, stating; "I don't have to say Limp Bizkit sucks, you know it, I know it, I shouldn't have to say it". Durst responded to Manson and Reznor's insults: "I understand that Marilyn Manson is very unhappy that his career has gone in a shambles and he's alienated his fans, so if he has to say things like that because he's very mad at himself, I would forgive him. And Trent Reznor's in the fucking same boat. Trent Reznor is obviously unhappy with how he's alienated the world, how long he took to make a record, and how he thought he was immortal. We're just here doing what we do and we have nothing to say about anybody. I wish them both luck and I feel sorry that they're so jealous and mad at themselves that they have to talk shit." Durst's relationship with Manson had seemingly grown cordial as the two later appeared on the cover of a Rolling Stone magazine issue in June 2003 alongside James Hetfield and Ozzy Osbourne. Limp Bizkit guitarist Wes Borland later joined Manson's touring band in 2008. Borland later departed Manson's touring band after less than nine months, citing an inability to songwrite and criticizing Manson's overbearing leadership. In 2021, Manson would become the subject of further controversy surrounding numerous sexual abuse allegations against him. Borland proceeded to attack Manson in numerous interviews, denouncing him as a "bad fucking dude". Trent Reznor, in an apparent change-of-heart, supported Borland's claims against Manson's misconduct, while also attacking him for the abuse allegations, during an interview with Ultimate Guitar.

=== Placebo ===
Limp Bizkit and Placebo began a long-standing feud, stemming from a show Durst was hosting at Irving Plaza in December 1998. Durst claimed he was prepared to introduce Placebo to the audience before singer Brian Molko insulted him, unaware of who he was. Durst later explained:

"I was on the side of the stage, and the singer comes and pushes me and says, 'Get the fuck out of here!' And I'm like, 'I'm just here because I was asked to introduce you.' And he's like, 'I don't give a fuck who you are, get off my stage' or whatever the fuck he was saying. So I guess he didn't know I was from Limp Bizkit, and I was introducing him."

Molko's behavior prompted Durst to rile up the crowd to chant "Placebo sucks!" prior to their performance. Molko later expressed that he was completely unaware that Durst was hosting the show. On June 11, 1999, Durst was introducing the band Staind, prior to their performance as part of K-Rock's Dysfunctional Family Picnic in Holmdel, New Jersey, when he once again instigated the audience to chant "Fuck Placebo". The feud was reignited during Big Day Out 2001, in which Placebo were billed below Limp Bizkit, with the band's bassist, Stefan Olsdal, claiming Placebo was fearful of the audience as they hostily waited for Limp Bizkit's performance during their set. By 2004, the feud had reportedly ended.

== Legacy and influence ==
Limp Bizkit is considered one of the defining bands of the nu metal genre. Alternative Press said: "As the years have gone by, some nü-metal outfits have progressively downplayed their bracket's hip-hop sensibilities. Even so, you can guarantee one of their primary influences were Limp Bizkit... the happily mismatched band from Jacksonville, Florida, established the ground rules of nü metal.. blur(ring) the lines between the two most polarizing genres in music... Limp Bizkit created timeless odes to teenage angst that, in time, we've discovered still apply right into adulthood." Metal Injection stated that "it's impossible to tell the story of late-'90s heavy music without Limp Bizkit" and argued that they are worthy of induction into the Rock and Roll Hall of Fame, saying "their continued festival dominance shows the nostalgia (and impact) is real."

Kerrang! magazine talked about the impact of the band's song "Break Stuff": "If Deftones represented something deeper about nu-metal, Limp Bizkit represented something entirely at the other end of the scale. Despite having a genuinely innovative guitarist in Wes Borland, whose vision for his genre-straddling band was probably more in line with bands like Primus, Faith No More and Mr. Bungle... Break Stuff, ahem, broke Limp Bizkit through its fiendishly simple two-chord motif, kick-up-the-arse drop, and its glued-to-MTV video featuring Jonathan Davis, Flea, as well as rap megastars Snoop Dogg, Eminem and Dr. Dre, taking them to an audience far beyond metal. The celebrity that followed was huge. The influence it left was huger."

Although Limp Bizkit inspired nu metal bands like Linkin Park in the 2000s, new bands in the genre continue to use Bizkit's sound as an influence, such as acclaimed nu metal revival band Wargasm, whose members grew up listening to Limp Bizkit and have said that they "wouldn't be the band we are today without them". Other bands that have cited Limp Bizkit as influence include Emmure, Hacktivist, Lionheart, Islander, Vision Eternel, and Zeal & Ardor.

Richard Cheese performed a lounge rendition of the songs "Nookie" and "Break Stuff" on his debut album, Lounge Against the Machine. The Vitamin String Quartet recorded a tribute album called The String Quartet Tribute to Limp Bizkit: Break Stuff, which contains reinterpretations of the band's songs performed by a violinist backed by cellos, synthesizers, and keyboard percussion. The Blackout covered "My Generation" for the compilation Higher Voltage!: Another Brief History of Rock.

Limp Bizkit also had a major impact on the professional wrestling world. They famously provided the track "My Way" for the music video for the WrestleMania 17 clash between Steve Austin and The Rock. Fred Durst is also featured in the SmackDown! Just Bring It video game. They performed their buzz single "Crack Addict" and also during WWE Legend, The Undertaker's entrance at Wrestlemania 19. They are the favorite band of several wrestlers including former WWE Diva's Champion and fellow Jacksonville native Kelly Kelly and former AEW athlete Sonny Kiss.

The band was negatively perceived in the early 21st century. In 2003, Guitar World readers voted Limp Bizkit the "worst band of the year". A 2013 Rolling Stone readers' poll voted Limp Bizkit as the third-worst band of the 1990s, behind Creed and Nickelback. The band was insulted by fellow musicians including Deftones' Chino Moreno and Slayer's Kerry King, with King admitting that Limp Bizkit's popularity made him consider quitting music. Slate noted how "liking Limp Bizkit can seem like an ethical failure: Durst's lyrics frequently affirm a noxious value system in which a seething hatred of The Man coexists with a seething hatred of women." The Independent stated that "Limp Bizkit was often... used as a similar shorthand for the misery bad rock music has apparently wrought upon the world." Following the band's set at Lollapalooza 2021, which was broadcast on Hulu, and the release of the song "Dad Vibes", the band began having a shift in public opinion, garnering positive responses from critics and audiences. The band's comeback album Still Sucks helped with the shifting opinion, with the album receiving mostly positive reviews.

Limp Bizkit was mentioned in a scene between Jim Carrey's Dr. Robotnik and Sir Idris Elba's Knuckles in the film Sonic the Hedgehog 2 (2022), where Robotnik compares Knuckles to being as useless as a "Limp Bizkit backstage pass".

Limp Bizkit appears in Generation Kill (2004), originally conceived by journalist Evan Wright as a three-part Rolling Stone magazine series, before being released as a full-length book and becoming a 2008 HBO mini-series under the same name. Generation Kill chronicles Wright's experience as a reporter traveling with a platoon of U.S. Recon Marines during the 2003 invasion of Iraq. While driving along a winding canal en route to Baghdad, a Ripped, Fuel-ed Corporal from Missouri named Josh Ray Person (played by actor James Ransone) memorably "recounts the band he formed after high school, Me or Society. A heavy-metal rap group, his band once opened for Limp Bizkit at a show in Kansas City. 'We sucked, but so did they,' Person says. 'The only difference is, they became famous right after we played together. I became a Marine.

== Band members ==
Current

- Fred Durst – lead vocals (1994–2006, 2009–present), guitar (2003–2004; occasionally 2011, 2020–present)
- John Otto – drums (1994–2006, 2009–present)
- Wes Borland – guitar, backing vocals (1995–1996, 1996–2001, 2004–2006, 2009–present)
- DJ Lethal – turntables, sampling, keyboards, programming (1996–2006, 2009–2012, 2012, 2018–present), backing vocals (2018–present)

Current touring musicians

- Richie Buxton – bass, backing vocals (2025–present)

Former

- Sam Rivers – bass, backing vocals (1994–2006, 2009–2015, 2018–2025; his death), guitar (2003)
- Rob Waters – guitar (1994–1995; died 2018)
- Terry Balsamo – guitar (1995)
- Scott Borland – keyboards, programming, sampling (1995–1996, session member 1996–2000)
- Mike Smith – guitar (2002–2004)

Former touring and session musicians

- Brian Welch – guitar (2003)
- Sammy Siegler – drums (2005; substitute for John Otto)
- Franko Carino (DJ SK3L3TOR) – sampling, programming (2012, 2013–2017), backing vocals (2013–2018)
- Samuel G Mpungu – bass (2015–2017, 2018)
- Nick Annis – guitar (2015)
- Tsuzumi Okai – bass (2018)
- Brandon Pertzborn – drums (2021; substitute for John Otto)
- Danny Connell – bass (2023; substitute for Sam Rivers)

== Discography ==
- Three Dollar Bill, Y'all (1997)
- Significant Other (1999)
- Chocolate Starfish and the Hot Dog Flavored Water (2000)
- Results May Vary (2003)
- Gold Cobra (2011)
- Still Sucks (2021)

== Accolades ==
Limp Bizkit has been nominated for and won several awards. Limp Bizkit has been nominated for three Grammy Awards including Best Hard Rock Performance ("Nookie"), Best Rock Album (Significant Other) and Best Hard Rock Performance ("Take A Look Around"). Limp Bizkit has been nominated for 3 American Music Awards for Favorite Alternative Artist, winning one of them in 2002.

In 1999, the band won the Maximum Vision Award at the Billboard Music Video Awards for their music video "Nookie" At the 2000 and 2001 Blockbuster Awards, the band won the Favorite Group (Rock) award. That year also saw the band winning a MuchMusic Award for Best International Video, honoring their video for the song "Break Stuff". At the 2001 Echo Awards, the band won the Best International Metal Band award. At the 2009 Kerrang! Awards, the band won the Hall of Fame award. Further expanding upon the group's achievements and popularity, they were also the first group inducted into MTV's Total Request Live "Hall of Fame" on May 26, 2001.

Association	Year (Note: Indicates the year of ceremony. Each year is linked to the article about the awards held that year, wherever possible.)	Category	Nominee(s) / Work	Result	Ref(s)
Billboard Music Award	1999	Top Billboard 200 Album Artist – Duo/Group	Limp Bizkit	Nominated	
Billboard Music Award	2000	Top Modern Rock Artist	Limp Bizkit	Won	
Billboard Music Award	2001	Top Billboard 200 Artist	Limp Bizkit	Nominated	
Billboard Music Award	2001	Top Billboard 200 Artist – Duo/Group	Limp Bizkit	Nominated	
Billboard Music Award	2001	Top Billboard 200 Album	Chocolate Starfish and the Hot Dog Flavored Water	Nominated	
Billboard Music Video Awards	1999	Maximum Vision Award	"Nookie"	Won	
Billboard Music Video Awards	1999	Best Hard Rock Clip	"Nookie"	Nominated	
Blockbuster Entertainment Awards	1999	Favorite CD	Significant Other	Nominated	
Blockbuster Entertainment Awards	1999	Favorite Group – Rock	Limp Bizkit	Nominated	
Blockbuster Entertainment Awards	2001	Favorite Group – Rock	Limp Bizkit	Won	
Brit Awards	2002	International Group	Limp Bizkit	Nominated	
Clio Awards	2026	Gaming Trailer/Teaser	"Break Stuff"	Nominated	
Echo Awards	2001	Best International Alternative	Limp Bizkit	Won	
Echo Awards	2002	Best International Alternative	Limp Bizkit	Nominated	
Emma-gaala	2000	Foreign Artist of the Year	Limp Bizkit	Nominated	
Gaffa Awards (Denmark)	2022	Best International Band	Limp Bizkit	Pending	
Grammy Awards	2000	Best Rock Album	Significant Other	Nominated	
Grammy Awards	2000	Best Hard Rock Performance	"Nookie"	Nominated	
Grammy Awards	2001	Best Hard Rock Performance	"Take a Look Around"	Nominated	
Hungarian Music Awards	2001	Best Foreign Rock Album	Chocolate Starfish and the Hot Dog Flavored Water	Nominated	
Hungarian Music Awards	2003	Best Foreign Rock Album	Results May Vary	Nominated	
International Dance Music Awards	2001	Best Alternative 12'	"Rollin'"	Won	
iHeartRadio MMVAs	2000	Best International Video	"Break Stuff"	Nominated	
iHeartRadio MMVAs	2000	Peoples Choice: Favourite International Group	"Re-Arranged"	Nominated	
Kerrang! Awards	2009	Hall of Fame	Limp Bizkit	Won	
MTV Europe Music Awards	2000	Best Rock	Limp Bizkit	Nominated	
MTV Europe Music Awards	2001	Best Rock	Limp Bizkit	Nominated	
MTV Europe Music Awards	2001	Best Group	Limp Bizkit	Won	
MTV Europe Music Awards	2001	Web Award	Limp Bizkit	Won	
MTV Europe Music Awards	2001	Best Album	Chocolate Starfish and the Hot Dog Flavored Water	Won	
MTV Italian Music Awards	2003	Rock the Mic Award (Best Live Performance)	"Nookie"	Nominated	
MTV Video Music Awards Japan	2002	Best Rock	Limp Bizkit	Nominated	
MTV Video Music Brazil	2004	Best International Video	"Behind Blue Eyes"	Nominated	
MVPA Awards	2000	Hip-Hop Video of the Year	"N 2 Gether Now"	Nominated	
MVPA Awards	2002	Best Special Effects in a Video	"Boiler"	Nominated	
My VH1 Music Awards	2000	Giving It Back Award	Limp Bizkit	Won	
NME Awards	2001	Best Single	"Take a Look Around"	Nominated	
NME Awards	2001	Best Metal Act	Limp Bizkit	Nominated	
Online Music Awards	1999	Favorite Hard Rock	Limp Bizkit	Nominated	
Pollstar Concert Industry Awards	2001	Most Creative Tour Package	Tour	Nominated	
Q Awards	2000	Best Single	"Take a Look Around"	Nominated	
Radio Music Awards	2000	Parents Just Don't Understand	Limp Bizkit	Nominated	
Teen Choice Awards	2000	Choice Rock Group	Limp Bizkit	Nominated	
Teen Choice Awards	2000	Choice Album	Significant Other	Nominated	
Teen Choice Awards	2001	Choice Rock Group	Limp Bizkit	Nominated	
Teen Choice Awards	2001	Choice Album	Chocolate Starfish and the Hot Dog Flavored Water	Nominated	
Teen Choice Awards	2001	Choice Rock Track	"My Way"	Nominated	
Top of the Pops Awards	2001	Best Rock Act	Limp Bizkit	Nominated	
UK Festival Awards	2010	Anthem of the Year	"Rollin'"	Nominated	
Žebřík Music Awards	2000	Best International Group	Limp Bizkit	Nominated	
Žebřík Music Awards	2000	Best International Surprise	Limp Bizkit	Nominated	
Žebřík Music Awards	2000	Best International Album	Chocolate Starfish and the Hot Dog Flavored Water	Nominated	
Žebřík Music Awards	2000	Best International Song	"Take a Look Around"	Nominated	
Žebřík Music Awards	2001	Best International Group	Limp Bizkit	Nominated	

== See also ==
- List of nu metal bands
