= Limp Bizkit discography =

Discography of American nu metal band Limp Bizkit

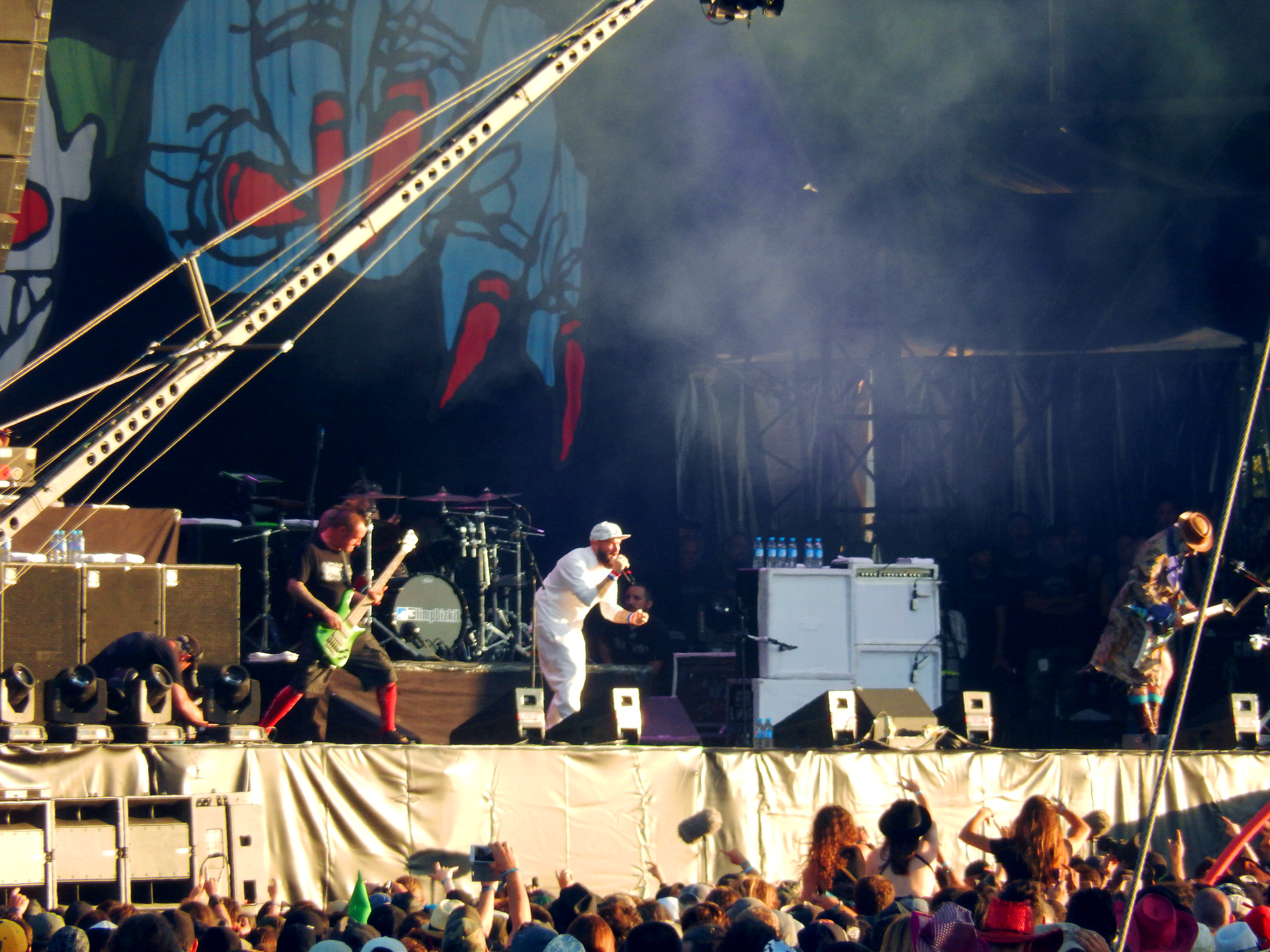
- Limp Bizkit at Hellfest 2015
- Studio albums: 6
- Extended plays: 1
- Live albums: 1
- Compilation albums: 3
- Singles: 21
- Video albums: 2
- Music videos: 31
- Remix albums: 1
- Promotional singles: 15

The discography of Limp Bizkit, an American nu metal band, consists of six studio albums, one EP, three compilation albums, one remix album, one live album, 26 singles, three promotional singles, 28 music videos and two video albums. Limp Bizkit formed in 1994 in Jacksonville, Florida. The band has sold an estimated 40 million albums worldwide.

== Albums ==
=== Studio albums ===
List of studio albums, with selected chart positions, sales figures and certifications
| Title | Album details | Peak chart positions | | | | | | | | | | Sales | Certifications |
| Title | Album details | US | AUS | AUT | CAN | FRA | GER | NLD | NZ | SWI | UK | Sales | Certifications |
|---|---|---|---|---|---|---|---|---|---|---|---|---|---|
| Three Dollar Bill, Y'all | Released: July 1, 1997; Label: Flip, Interscope; Formats: CD, CS, LP, digital download | 22 | 32 | — | 29 | — | — | — | 37 | — | 50 | | RIAA: 2× Platinum; ARIA: Gold; BPI: Gold; MC: Platinum |
| Significant Other | Released: June 22, 1999; Label: Flip, Interscope; Formats: CD, CS, LP, digital download | 1 | 5 | 7 | 1 | 70 | 13 | 11 | 4 | 38 | 10 | US: 7,237,123 (Note: Sales as of April 2002) | RIAA: 7× Platinum; ARIA: 2× Platinum; BPI: Platinum; BVMI: Gold; IFPI AUT: Gold; IFPI SWI: Gold; MC: 6× Platinum; NVPI: Platinum; RMNZ: 2× Platinum |
| Chocolate Starfish and the Hot Dog Flavored Water | Released: October 17, 2000; Label: Flip, Interscope; Formats: CD, CS, LP, digital download | 1 | 1 | 1 | 1 | 7 | 1 | 1 | 1 | 4 | 1 | US: 8,000,000 (Note: Sales as of December 2011); UK: 889,000 (Note: Sales as of 2020) | RIAA: 6× Platinum; ARIA: 5× Platinum; BPI: 3× Platinum; BVMI: 5× Gold; IFPI AUT: Platinum; IFPI SWI: Platinum; MC: 6× Platinum; NVPI: Platinum; RMNZ: 5× Platinum; SNEP: Gold |
| Results May Vary | Released: September 23, 2003; Label: Flip, Interscope; Formats: CD, LP, digital download | 3 | 2 | 1 | 3 | 19 | 1 | 11 | 2 | 6 | 7 | US: 1,337,356 (Note: Sales as of July 2004) | RIAA: Platinum; ARIA: Platinum; BPI: Gold; BVMI: Gold; IFPI AUT: Gold; IFPI SWI: Gold; RMNZ: Gold |
| Gold Cobra | Released: June 28, 2011; Label: Flip, Interscope; Formats: CD, LP, digital download | 16 | 12 | 2 | 13 | 39 | 1 | 23 | 36 | 2 | 30 | US: 63,000 (Note: Sales as of December 2011) | BVMI: Gold |
| Still Sucks | Released: October 31, 2021; Label: Suretone; Formats: CD, digital download | 155 | 35 | 29 | — | — | 54 | — | — | 35 | 79 | | |
"—" denotes a recording that did not chart or was not released in that territory.

=== Live albums ===
List of live albums
| Title | Album details |
|---|---|
| Rock im Park 2001 | Released: May 13, 2008 (DVD); Label: Liberation; Formats: DVD, digital download; Re-released: November 24, 2023 (vinyl); Label: Culture Factory; Record Store Day exclusive.; Formats: Vinyl, CD, digital download |

=== Compilation albums ===
List of compilation albums, with selected chart positions and certifications
| Title | Album details | Peak chart positions | | | | | | | | | Certifications |
| Title | Album details | US | AUS | AUT | CAN | BEL (FL) | BEL (WA) | GER | SWI | UK | Certifications |
|---|---|---|---|---|---|---|---|---|---|---|---|
| Greatest Hitz | Released: November 8, 2005; Label: Flip, Interscope; Formats: CD, digital download | 47 | 29 | 27 | 69 | 68 | 84 | 25 | 41 | 78 | ARIA: Gold; BPI: Platinum; BVMI: Gold |
| Collected | Released: May 12, 2008; Label: Spectrum; Formats: CD, digital download | — | — | — | — | — | — | — | — | — | |
| Icon | Released: July 19, 2011; Label: Interscope; Formats: CD, digital download | — | — | — | — | — | — | — | — | — | |
"—" denotes a recording that did not chart or was not released in that territory.

=== Remix albums ===
List of remix albums, with selected chart positions and certifications
| Title | Album details | Peak chart positions | | | | | | | | | | Certifications |
| Title | Album details | US | AUS | AUT | BEL (FL) | FIN | FRA | GER | NZ | SWI | UK | Certifications |
|---|---|---|---|---|---|---|---|---|---|---|---|---|
| New Old Songs | Released: December 4, 2001; Label: Flip, Interscope; Formats: CD, digital download | 26 | 65 | 12 | 40 | 22 | 146 | 10 | 19 | 32 | 76 | RIAA: Gold; BPI: Gold |

=== Video albums ===
List of video albums
| Title | Album details |
|---|---|
| Greatest Videoz | Released: November 9, 2005; Label: Flip, Interscope; Formats: DVD |
| Rock im Park 2001 | Released: March 31, 2008; Label: Liberation; Formats: DVD |

== Extended play ==
List of extended plays, with selected chart positions
| Title | Details | Peak chart positions | | | | | | | | | | Sales |
| Title | Details | US | AUS | AUT | CAN | FRA | GER | ITA | NLD | SWI | UK | Sales |
|---|---|---|---|---|---|---|---|---|---|---|---|---|
| The Unquestionable Truth (Part 1) | Released: May 2, 2005; Label: Flip, Geffen; Formats: CD, digital download | 24 | 50 | 17 | 23 | 67 | 4 | 35 | 85 | 8 | 71 | US: 93,000 (Note: Sales as of August 2008) |

== Singles ==
=== As lead artist ===
List of singles, with selected chart positions and certifications, showing year released and album name
| Title | Year | Peak chart positions | | | | | | | | | | Certifications | Album |
| Title | Year | US | US Alt. | US Main. Rock | AUS | AUT | GER | IRL | NLD | SWI | UK | Certifications | Album |
|---|---|---|---|---|---|---|---|---|---|---|---|---|---|
| "Counterfeit" | 1997 | — | — | — | — | — | — | — | — | — | — | | Three Dollar Bill, Y'all |
| "Nookie" | 1999 | 80 | 3 | 6 | 13 | — | — | — | 36 | — | — | BPI: Silver; RMNZ: Platinum | Significant Other |
| "Re-Arranged" | 1999 | 88 | 1 | 8 | 35 | — | — | — | — | — | — | | Significant Other |
| "N 2 Gether Now" (featuring Method Man)^{[B]} | 1999 | 70 | — | — | — | — | 42 | — | 28 | 95 | 184 | RMNZ: Gold | Significant Other |
| "Break Stuff"^{[B]} | 2000 | —^{[C]} | 14 | 19 | 41 | — | 42 | — | 28 | 95 | — | BPI: 2× Platinum; RMNZ: 4× Platinum | Significant Other |
| "Take a Look Around" | 2000 | —^{[D]} | 8 | 15 | 28 | 4 | 4 | 11 | 7 | 7 | 3 | BPI: Platinum; BVMI: Gold; IFPI AUT: Gold; IFPI SWI: Gold; RMNZ: 2× Platinum | Chocolate Starfish and the Hot Dog Flavored Water |
| "Rollin' (Air Raid Vehicle)" | 2000 | 65 | 4 | 10 | 11 | 10 | 10 | 1 | 18 | 21 | 1 | ARIA: Gold; BPI: 2× Platinum; BVMI: Platinum; IFPI SWI: Gold; RMNZ: 3× Platinum | Chocolate Starfish and the Hot Dog Flavored Water |
| "My Generation" | 2000 | — | 18 | 33 | 31 | 19 | 23 | 25 | 14 | 23 | 15 | BPI: Silver; RMNZ: Platinum | Chocolate Starfish and the Hot Dog Flavored Water |
| "My Way" | 2001 | 75 | 3 | 4 | 57 | 51 | 38 | 10 | 56 | 99 | 6 | BPI: Platinum; RMNZ: 2× Platinum | Chocolate Starfish and the Hot Dog Flavored Water |
| "Boiler" | 2001 | — | — | 30 | — | 44 | 50 | 24 | 68 | 57 | 18 | | Chocolate Starfish and the Hot Dog Flavored Water |
| "Eat You Alive" | 2003 | — | 20 | 16 | 30 | 16 | 13 | 27 | 36 | 31 | 10 | | Results May Vary |
| "Behind Blue Eyes" | 2003 | 71 | 18 | 11 | 4 | 3 | 2 | 26 | 5 | 5 | 18 | RIAA: Gold; ARIA: Platinum; BPI: Platinum; BVMI: 2× Platinum; IFPI SWI: Gold; RMNZ: 2× Platinum | Results May Vary |
| "Home Sweet Home/Bittersweet Symphony" | 2005 | — | — | — | 44 | 44 | 45 | — | — | 96 | — | | Greatest Hitz |
| "Shotgun" | 2011 | — | — | — | — | — | — | 21 | — | — | — | | Gold Cobra |
| "Ready to Go" | 2013 | — | — | — | — | — | — | 28 | — | — | — | | Non-album single |
| "Dad Vibes" | 2021 | — | — | 37 | — | — | — | — | — | — | — | | Still Sucks |
| "Turn It Up, Bitch" | 2021 | — | — | 39 | — | — | — | — | — | — | — | | Still Sucks |
| "Making Love to Morgan Wallen" | 2025 | — (Note: "Making Love to Morgan Wallen" did not enter the Hot 100, but peaked at number 23 on the US Digital Songs chart.) | 23 | 3 | — | — | — (Note: "Making Love to Morgan Wallen" did not enter the German Singles Chart, but peaked at number 34 on the Germany Airplay Chart.) | — | — | — | — (Note: "Making Love to Morgan Wallen" did not enter the UK Singles Chart, but peaked at number 67 on the UK Singles Sales Chart.) | | Battlefield 6 (Original Video Game Soundtrack) |
"—" denotes a recording that did not chart or was not released in that territory.

=== As featured artist ===
List of singles, showing year released and album name
| Title | Year | Album |
|---|---|---|
| "Here We Are (Champions)" (Kevin Rudolf featuring Limp Bizkit, Birdman and Lil Wayne) | 2013 | Rich Gang |

=== Promotional singles ===
List of promotional singles, showing year released and album name
| Title | Year | Peak chart positions | | Album |
| Title | Year | US Alt. | US Main. Rock | Album |
|---|---|---|---|---|
| "Nobody Loves Me"^{[A]} | 1997 | — | — | Three Dollar Bill, Y'all |
| "Sour" | 1998 | — | — | Three Dollar Bill, Y'all |
| "Faith" | 1998 | 28 | 33 | Three Dollar Bill, Y'all |
| "Crushed" | 1999 | 31 | — | End of Days soundtrack |
| "Getcha Groove On" (featuring Xzibit)^{[E]} | 2000 | — | — | Chocolate Starfish and the Hot Dog Flavored Water |
| "It's Like That Y'all" | 2000 | — | — | Non-album singles |
| "Just Drop Dead" | 2003 | — | — | Non-album singles |
| "Crack Addict" | 2003 | — | — | Non-album singles |
| "Phenomenon" | 2003 | — | — | Results May Vary |
| "Build a Bridge" (with Head) | 2004 | — | — | Results May Vary |
| "Almost Over" | 2004 | — | 33 | Results May Vary |
| "The Truth" | 2005 | — | — | The Unquestionable Truth (Part 1) |
| "Why Try" | 2010 | — | — | Gold Cobra |
| "Walking Away" | 2010 | — | — | Gold Cobra |
| "Gold Cobra" | 2011 | — | — | Gold Cobra |
| "Lightz (City of Angels)" | 2012 | — | — | Non-album singles |
| "Thieves" | 2013 | — | — | Non-album singles |
| "Endless Slaughter" | 2014 | — | — | Non-album singles |

=== Other certified songs ===
| Title | Year | Certifications | Album |
|---|---|---|---|
| "Hot Dog" | 2000 | BPI: Silver; RMNZ: Platinum | Chocolate Starfish and the Hot Dog Flavored Water |

== Music videos ==
List of music videos
| Song | Year | Director(s) |
|---|---|---|
| "Counterfeit" | 1997 | Roger Pistole and Jonathan Craven |
| "Counterfeit" (second version) | 1997 | Roger Pistole |
| "Sour" | 1998 | Fred Durst and Roger Pistole |
| "Faith" | 1998 | Fred Durst |
| "Nookie" | 1999 | Fred Durst |
| "Re-Arranged" | 1999 | Fred Durst |
| "N 2 Gether Now" (featuring Method Man) | 1999 | Fred Durst |
| "Break Stuff" | 2000 | Fred Durst |
| "Take a Look Around" | 2000 | Fred Durst |
| "Rollin' (Air Raid Vehicle)" | 2000 | Fred Durst |
| "My Generation" | 2000 | Fred Durst |
| "My Way" | 2001 | Fred Durst |
| "Boiler" | 2001 | David Meyers and Fred Durst |
| "Counterfeit" (Lethal Dose remix) | 2001 | Roger Pistole |
| "Faith / Fame" (remix) (featuring Everlast) | 2001 | Fred Durst |
| "Nookie" (Neptunes remix) | 2001 | Fred Durst |
| "Nookie" (Androids vs. Las Putas remix) | 2001 | Fred Durst |
| "Re-Arranged" (Timbaland remix) (featuring Bubba Sparxxx) | 2001 | Fred Durst |
| "N 2 Gether Now" (Neptunes remix) (featuring Method Man) | 2001 | Fred Durst |
| "My Way" (William Orbit remix) | 2001 | Fred Durst |
| "Eat You Alive" | 2003 | Fred Durst |
| "Eat You Alive" (extended version) | 2003 | Fred Durst |
| "Behind Blue Eyes" | 2003 | Fred Durst |
| "Behind Blue Eyes" (second version) | 2003 | Fred Durst |
| "The Truth" | 2005 | Fred Durst |
| "Home Sweet Home / Bittersweet Symphony" | 2005 | Fred Durst |
| "Gold Cobra" | 2011 | Fred Durst |
| "Lightz (City of Angels)" | 2012 | Fred Durst and Phil the God |
| "Ready to Go" (featuring Lil Wayne) | 2013 | Fred Durst |
| "Endless Slaughter" | 2014 | Fred Durst |
| "Dad Vibes" | 2022 | Funky Moses |
| "Out of Style" | 2023 | Fred Durst and Mark Klasfeld |
| "Turn It Up, Bitch" | 2024 | Pavel Zhigarev and Fred Durst |

== Notes ==
- A For its original 1997 release in the United States, "Counterfeit" was released as a double A-side single with "Nobody Loves Me". "Counterfeit" was re-released twice; in late 1997, and once more on September 28, 1999, under the revised title "Counterfeit Countdown".
- B "N 2 Gether Now" and "Break Stuff" charted together as a double A-side single in the Netherlands and Switzerland.
- C "Break Stuff" did not enter the Billboard Hot 100, but peaked at number 23 on the Bubbling Under Hot 100 Singles chart, which acts as an extension to the Hot 100.
- D "Take a Look Around" did not enter the Billboard Hot 100, but peaked at number 15 on the Bubbling Under Hot 100 Singles chart, which acts as an extension to the Hot 100.
- E "Rollin" was released as a double A-side single with "Getcha Groove On".
- F "Dad Vibes" did not enter the Billboard Alternative Airplay chart, but peaked at number 50 on the Hot Rock & Alternative Songs chart.
- G "Dad Vibes" did not enter the Billboard Mainstream Rock chart, but peaked at number 6 on the Hot Hard Rock Songs chart.
