= Greatest Videoz =

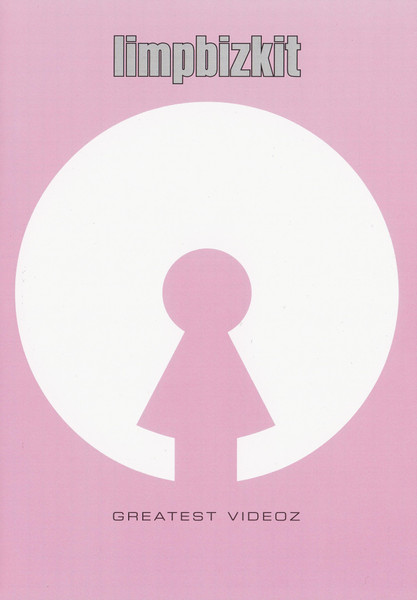

Video by Limp Bizkit
- Released: November 9, 2005
- Recorded: 1997–2003
- Genre: Nu metal; rap metal; rap rock; alternative rock
- Label: Flip; Geffen

Limp Bizkit video chronology
Greatest Videoz (2005)	Rock im Park 2001 (2008)

Greatest Videoz is a DVD by American band Limp Bizkit. Released in 2005, it is a companion to the band's compilation album Greatest Hitz. The DVD compiles music videos from the band's albums Three Dollar Bill, Yall$, Significant Other, Chocolate Starfish and the Hot Dog Flavored Water, Results May Vary and The Unquestionable Truth (Part 1).

== Production and content ==
A greatest hits album was announced for release as early as 2001. While recording the albums Results May Vary and The Unquestionable Truth (Part 1), the band continued to work on the compilation. A companion album, Greatest Hitz, was also released.

Greatest Hitz contains material from the band's albums Three Dollar Bill, Yall$, Significant Other, Chocolate Starfish and the Hot Dog Flavored Water and Results May Vary.

Fred Durst began to take interest in directing late in 1997, directing the band's music video for "Faith". Before directing the final music video featured on this compilation, Durst filmed an early version in promotion for its appearance in the film Very Bad Things, but was unsatisfied with it. The final music video, as featured on this DVD, paid tribute to tourmates like Primus, Deftones and Mötley Crüe, who appeared in the video.

The video for "Re-Arranged" reflects on the criticisms surrounding the band following their performance at Woodstock '99. Durst saw the band as being scapegoated for the event's controversy, and directed a video in which the band receives death sentences for their participation in the concerts. The video ended with angry witnesses watching as the band drowning in milk while performing the song. The ending of the video sets up the concept for the band's next video, "N 2 Gether Now", which featured Method Man and Pauly Shore, and was inspired by Inspector Clouseau's fights with his butler, Cato Fong, in the Pink Panther film series.

However, the videos for "Sour", "Take a Look Around", "The Truth" and "Home Sweet Home/Bittersweet Symphony", as well as the few videos from New Old Songs are missing.

== Music and lyrics ==
The music of Greatest Videoz has predominately been described as nu metal and is noted for "kinetic, frenzied energy". On this compilation, DJ Lethal functions as a sound designer for the band, shaping their sound. According to Lethal, "I try and bring new sounds, not just the regular chirping scratching sounds. [...] It's all different stuff that you haven't heard before. I'm trying to be like another guitar player."

Wes Borland's guitar playing on this compilation is experimental and nontraditional, and is noted for creative use of six and seven-string guitars. The songs from Three Dollar Bill, Yall$ feature him playing without a guitar pick, performing with two hands, one playing melodic notes, and the other playing chord progressions. His guitar playing on this album also makes use of octave shapes, and choppy, eighth-note rhythms, sometimes accompanied by muting his strings with his left hand, creating a percussive sound. Borland's guitar playing also has unevenly accented syncopated sixteenth notes to create a disorienting effect, and hypnotic, droning licks.

Durst's lyrics are often profane, scatological or angry. Much of Durst's lyrical inspiration came from growing up and his personal life. His breakup with her inspired the Significant Other songs "Nookie" and "Re-Arranged".

== Track listing ==
No.	Title	Music	Director(s)	Length
1.	"Counterfeit"	from Three Dollar Bill, Yall$	Roger Pistole and Johnathan Craven
2.	"Faith"	from Three Dollar Bill, Yall$	Fred Durst
3.	"Nookie"	from Significant Other	Fred Durst
4.	"Break Stuff"	from Significant Other	Fred Durst
5.	"Re-Arranged"	from Significant Other	Fred Durst
6.	"N 2 Gether Now" (feat. Method Man)	from Significant Other	Fred Durst
7.	"My Generation"	from Chocolate Starfish and the Hot Dog Flavored Water	Fred Durst
8.	"Rollin' (Air Raid Vehicle)"	from Chocolate Starfish and the Hot Dog Flavored Water	Fred Durst
9.	"My Way"	from Chocolate Starfish and the Hot Dog Flavored Water	Fred Durst
10.	"Boiler"	from Chocolate Starfish and the Hot Dog Flavored Water	Dave Meyers and Fred Durst
11.	"Eat You Alive"	from Results May Vary	Fred Durst
12.	"Behind Blue Eyes"	from Results May Vary	Fred Durst

== Personnel ==
=== Musicians ===
Tracks 1–10

- Fred Durst - vocals
- Wes Borland - guitars
- Sam Rivers - bass
- John Otto - drums, percussion
- DJ Lethal - turntables, samples, keyboards, programming, sound development

Track 11

- Fred Durst - vocals
- Mike Smith - guitar
- Sam Rivers - bass
- John Otto - drums, percussion
- DJ Lethal - turntables, keyboards, samples, programming, sound development

Track 12

- Fred Durst - vocals
- Randy Pereira - guitar
- Sam Rivers - bass
- John Otto - drums, percussion
- DJ Lethal - turntables, keyboards, samples, programming, sound development

=== Cast ===
Counterfeit

- Sen Dog
- Thom Hazaert

Faith

- Jonathan Davis
- Reginald Arvizu
- Brian Welch
- Ice Cube
- James Shaffer
- Les Claypool

Break Stuff

- Eminem
- Dr. Dre
- Jonathan Davis
- Snoop Dogg
- Pauly Shore
- Seth Green

Re-Arranged

- Matt Pinfield

N 2 Gether Now

- Method Man
- Redman
- Pauly Shore

Rollin' (Air Raid Vehicle)

- Ben Stiller
- Stephen Dorff

Eat You Alive

- Bill Paxton
- Thora Birch

Behind Blue Eyes

- Halle Berry
