= Icon (Limp Bizkit album) =

Compilation album by Limp Bizkit
- Released: July 19, 2011
- Recorded: 1997–2005
- Genre: Nu metal, rap metal
- Label: Flip/Interscope

Limp Bizkit chronology
Gold Cobra (2011)	Icon (2011)	Still Sucks (2021)

Icon is the third compilation album by American nu metal band Limp Bizkit. Released in 2011, it is a retrospective compiling material from the band's albums Three Dollar Bill, Yall$, Significant Other, Chocolate Starfish and the Hot Dog Flavored Water, Results May Vary and The Unquestionable Truth (Part 1).

== Critical reception ==
Professional ratings
Review scores
Source	Rating
AllMusic	3.5/5 stars

AllMusic's Stephen Thomas Erlewine wrote that Icon "[provides] a good overview of the leading rap-metal outfit of the '90s."

== Track listing ==
No.	Title	Music	Length
1.	"Counterfeit"	from Three Dollar Bill, Yall$	5:08
2.	"Faith" (George Michael cover)	from Three Dollar Bill, Yall$	2:26
3.	"Nookie"	from Significant Other	4:26
4.	"Break Stuff"	from Significant Other	2:46
5.	"Re-Arranged"	from Significant Other	5:54
6.	"Take a Look Around"	from Chocolate Starfish and the Hot Dog Flavored Water	5:19
7.	"Rollin' (Air Raid Vehicle)"	from Chocolate Starfish and the Hot Dog Flavored Water	3:33
8.	"My Way"	from Chocolate Starfish and the Hot Dog Flavored Water	4:33
9.	"Eat You Alive"	from Results May Vary	3:57
10.	"Behind Blue Eyes" (The Who cover)	from Results May Vary	4:29
11.	"The Truth"	from The Unquestionable Truth (Part 1)	5:25
Total length:			47:36

== Personnel ==
- Fred Durst - vocals
- Wes Borland - guitars
- Mike Smith - guitar on track 9
- Randy Pereira - guitar on track 10
- Sam Rivers - bass
- John Otto - drums, percussion
- DJ Lethal - turntables, samples, keyboards, programming, sound development
