= Greatest Hitz =

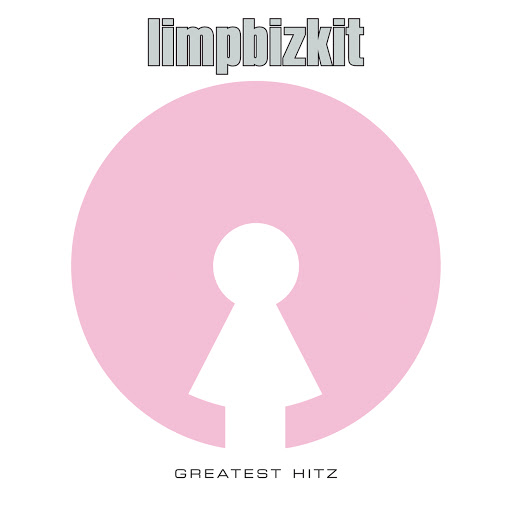

Compilation album by Limp Bizkit
- Released: November 8, 2005
- Recorded: 1997–2005
- Genre: Nu metal; rap metal; rap rock; alternative rock
- Length: 71:41
- Label: Flip; Geffen

Limp Bizkit chronology
The Unquestionable Truth (Part 1) (2005)	Greatest Hitz (2005)	Collected (2008)

Singles from Greatest Hitz
- 1. "Home Sweet Home/Bittersweet Symphony" Released: December 27, 2005

Greatest Hitz is a compilation album by American nu metal band Limp Bizkit. Released in 2005, it is a retrospective compiling material from the band's albums Three Dollar Bill, Y'all (1997), Significant Other (1999), Chocolate Starfish and the Hot Dog Flavored Water (2000) and Results May Vary (2003).

== Production and content ==
Greatest Hitz was announced for release as early as 2001. While recording the album Results May Vary and the EP The Unquestionable Truth (Part 1), the band continued to work on the compilation. A companion DVD, Greatest Videoz, was also released.

Greatest Hitz contains material from the band's albums Three Dollar Bill, Y'all (1997), Significant Other (1999), Chocolate Starfish and the Hot Dog Flavored Water (2000) and Results May Vary (2003), as well as previously unreleased tracks and a new song entitled "Home Sweet Home/Bittersweet Symphony", a medley of "Home Sweet Home" by Mötley Crüe and "Bitter Sweet Symphony" by The Verve.

== Reception ==
Professional ratings
Review scores
Source	Rating
AllMusic	4/5 stars
Decibel	2/10
The Encyclopedia of Popular Music	4/5 stars
The Essential Rock Discography	7/10
IGN	6.9/10

Greatest Hitz peaked at No. 47 on the Billboard 200. AllMusic's Stephen Thomas Erlewine said, "None of [Greatest Hitz] has aged well – as a matter of fact, it's aged incredibly quickly, sounding older than alt-rock hits from the mid-'90s – but that's almost beside the point, because this does its job well, and listeners who want to have some Limp Bizkit in their collection will find this to provide them with more of what they want than any other Bizkit dizc." In The Essential Rock Discography, Martin Charles Strong gave the compilation a 7 out of 10 rating.

== Track listing ==
No.	Title	Original album	Length
1.	"Counterfeit"	Three Dollar Bill, Y'all (1997)	4:48
2.	"Faith" (George Michael cover)	Three Dollar Bill, Y'all	2:26
3.	"Nookie"	Significant Other (1999)	4:26
4.	"Break Stuff"	Significant Other	2:46
5.	"Re-Arranged"	Significant Other	5:54
6.	"N 2 Gether Now" (featuring Method Man)	Significant Other	3:55
7.	"Take a Look Around"	Chocolate Starfish and the Hot Dog Flavored Water/Mission: Impossible 2 (2000)	5:19
8.	"My Generation"	Chocolate Starfish and the Hot Dog Flavored Water	3:41
9.	"Rollin' (Air Raid Vehicle)"	Chocolate Starfish and the Hot Dog Flavored Water	3:33
10.	"My Way"	Chocolate Starfish and the Hot Dog Flavored Water	4:33
11.	"Boiler"	Chocolate Starfish and the Hot Dog Flavored Water	5:44
12.	"Eat You Alive"	Results May Vary (2003)	3:57
13.	"Behind Blue Eyes" (The Who cover)	Results May Vary	4:29
14.	"Build a Bridge"	Results May Vary	3:56
15.	"Why"	Recorded during the Results May Vary sessions / previously unreleased	4:05
16.	"Lean on Me"	Recorded during the Results May Vary sessions / previously unreleased	4:27
17.	"Home Sweet Home/Bittersweet Symphony" (Mötley Crüe and The Verve cover)	Medley of "Home Sweet Home" by Mötley Crüe and "Bitter Sweet Symphony" by The Verve / previously unreleased (2005)	3:42
Total length:			71:41

Bonus track on certain editions
No.	Title	Music	Length
18.	"The Truth"	The Unquestionable Truth (Part 1) (2005)

== Personnel ==
Tracks 1–11

- Fred Durst – vocals
- Wes Borland – guitars
- DJ Lethal – turntables, samples, keyboards, programming, sound development
- John Otto – drums, percussion
- Sam Rivers – bass

Tracks 12–17

- Fred Durst – vocals, guitar
- Mike Smith – guitars on "Eat You Alive"
- Randy Pereira – guitar on "Behind Blue Eyes"
- Brian Welch – guitar on "Build a Bridge"
- DJ Lethal – turntables, keyboards, samples, programming, sound development
- John Otto – drums, percussion
- Sam Rivers – bass

== Charts ==
2005 chart performance
Chart (2005)	Peak position
Australian Albums (ARIA)	29
Austrian Albums (Ö3 Austria)	27
Belgian Albums (Ultratop Flanders)	68
Belgian Alternative Albums (Ultratop Flanders)	33
Belgian Albums (Ultratop Wallonia)	84
Canadian Albums (Nielsen SoundScan)	74
German Albums (Offizielle Top 100)	25
Japanese Albums (Oricon)	19
Scottish Albums (OCC)	68
Swiss Albums (Schweizer Hitparade)	41
UK Albums (OCC)	78
UK Rock & Metal Albums (OCC)	7
US Billboard 200	47

2014 chart performance
Chart (2014)	Peak position
Dutch Midprice Albums (Midprice Top 50)	36

2025 chart performance
Chart (2025)	Peak position
Canadian Albums (Billboard)	69
Irish Albums (IRMA)	67

== Certifications ==
Certifications
Region	Certification	Certified units/sales
Australia (ARIA)	Gold	35,000^{^}
Germany (BVMI)	Gold	100,000^{^}
New Zealand (RMNZ)	Gold	7,500^{^}
United Kingdom (BPI)	Platinum	300,000^{‡}
^{^} Shipments figures based on certification alone.^{‡} Sales+streaming figures based on certification alone.
