= Collected (Limp Bizkit album) =

Compilation album by Limp Bizkit
- Released: May 12, 2008
- Recorded: 1997–2005
- Genres: Nu metal, rap metal
- Length: 64:37
- Label: Spectrum

Limp Bizkit chronology
| Greatest Hitz (2005) | Collected (2008) | Gold Cobra (2011) |

Collected is the second compilation album by American nu metal band Limp Bizkit. Released in 2008, it is a retrospective compilation album from the band's albums Three Dollar Bill, Y'all, Significant Other, Chocolate Starfish and the Hot Dog Flavored Water, Results May Vary and The Unquestionable Truth (Part 1).

== Content ==
Collected contains material from the band's albums Three Dollar Bill, Yall$, Significant Other, Chocolate Starfish and the Hot Dog Flavored Water, Results May Vary and The Unquestionable Truth (Part 1). The compilation was released in Europe by Spectrum Music, a subsidiary of Universal Music Group.

== Critical reception ==
Professional ratings
Review scores
| Source | Rating |
|---|---|
| AllMusic | 2.5/5 stars |

Collected did not chart. AllMusic's James Christopher Monger gave the album 2.5 out of 5, writing "Fans of the raucous rap/nu/alternative metal outfit would be better off with 2005's Greatest Hitz compilation".

== Track listing ==
| No. | Title | Music | Length |
|---|---|---|---|
| 1. | "Pollution" | from Three Dollar Bill, Yall$ | 3:49 |
| 2. | "The Propaganda" | from The Unquestionable Truth (Part 1) | 5:17 |
| 3. | "Build A Bridge" | from Results May Vary | 3:58 |
| 4. | "The Story" | from The Unquestionable Truth (Part 1) | 3:51 |
| 5. | "Rollin' (Air Raid Vehicle)" | from Chocolate Starfish and the Hot Dog Flavored Water | 3:33 |
| 6. | "Livin' It Up" | from Chocolate Starfish and the Hot Dog Flavored Water | 3:33 |
| 7. | "Show Me What You Got" | from Significant Other | 4:29 |
| 8. | "Behind Blue Eyes" (The Who cover) | from Results May Vary | 4:32 |
| 9. | "Getcha Groove On" | from Chocolate Starfish and the Hot Dog Flavored Water | 4:31 |
| 10. | "Nobody Like You" | from Significant Other | 4:22 |
| 11. | "Stuck" | from Three Dollar Bill, Yall$ | 5:13 |
| 12. | "Re-Arranged" | from Significant Other | 5:56 |
| 13. | "Counterfeit" | from Three Dollar Bill, Yall$ | 5:10 |
| 14. | "The Truth" | from The Unquestionable Truth (Part 1) | 5:27 |
| Total length: | | | 64:37 |

== Personnel ==
- Fred Durst - vocals
- Wes Borland - guitars
- Mike Smith - guitar on track 3
- Randy Pereira - guitar on track 8
- Sam Rivers - bass
- John Otto - drums, percussion
- DJ Lethal - turntables, samples, keyboards, programming, sound development
