= Gold Cobra =

2011 studio album by Limp Bizkit

- Deluxe edition cover art. Original release has a silver logo.

Studio album by Limp Bizkit
- Released: June 28, 2011
- Recorded: August 2009 – March 2011
- Genres: Nu metal; rap rock
- Length: 49:37
- Labels: Flip; Interscope
- Producer: Fred Durst

Limp Bizkit chronology
Collected (2008)	Gold Cobra (2011)	Icon (2011)

Limp Bizkit studio album chronology
Results May Vary (2003)	Gold Cobra (2011)	Still Sucks (2021)

Singles from Gold Cobra
- 1. "Shotgun" Released: May 17, 2011; 2. "Gold Cobra" Released: June 28, 2011

Gold Cobra is the fifth studio album by American nu metal band Limp Bizkit. It was released on June 28, 2011, through Flip and Interscope Records. The album was the band's first studio album since 2003's Results May Vary and the first with the classic lineup since 2000's Chocolate Starfish and the Hot Dog Flavored Water. Gold Cobra features an eclectic and diverse sound, but is also similar in style to the band's earlier albums. The album, which featured the single "Shotgun" and received mixed reviews, sold 27,000 copies during its first week in the United States and peaked at No. 16 on the Billboard 200. This was their last album for a decade, until the band released Still Sucks in 2021.

== Background ==
In 2004, Limp Bizkit recorded The Unquestionable Truth (Part 1), with returning member Wes Borland, but John Otto was replaced by Sammy Siegler for much of the album. Following the release of the band's Greatest Hitz album, the band went on hiatus. Borland stated that it was unlikely that a sequel to The Unquestionable Truth would be produced and that "As of right now, none of my future plans include Limp Bizkit." In 2009, Limp Bizkit reunited with Borland on guitar and launched the Unicorns N' Rainbows Tour.

During the tour Durst announced that they had begun to record a new album with Borland, titled Gold Cobra. Borland said that the title does not have any meaning, and that it was chosen because it fit the style of music the band was writing for the album. The band recorded a spoken intro written by Durst and performed by Kiss member Gene Simmons for the album, but it was left off the completed album. The band also recorded additional "non-album" tracks, including "Combat Jazz", which featured rapper Raekwon.

== Music and lyrics ==
The music of Gold Cobra was generally described as nu metal, and has been noted as a return to the established sound of Limp Bizkit's earlier albums. However, the album features noticeable variations from the band's established style for a more eclectic sound. Unlike Significant Other, Chocolate Starfish and the Hot Dog Flavored Water and Results May Vary, Gold Cobra does not feature any guest vocalists, except for two of the bonus tracks, and the album's sound predominately focuses on the guitar work of Wes Borland rather than that of turntablist and sound designer DJ Lethal. Sam Rivers' bass playing incorporates elements of jazz and funk, while Borland's guitar playing incorporates a variety of influences, ranging from heavy metal and hard rock to electronic music and DJ Lethal's keyboards and samples give the album a sound that is both melodic and abrasive. The intro, "Introbra", features distorted air raid sirens, and is much darker in tone than the hip hop-influenced intros on Significant Other and Chocolate Starfish and the Hot Dog Flavored Water. Interludes on the album incorporate elements of hip hop and jazz.

"Shotgun" (sample)
"Shotgun", from Limp Bizkit's album Gold Cobra, highlights Borland's unique playing style in this solo.

"Bring It Back" differs from Limp Bizkit's established sound by being slower and heavier than the band is generally known for. "Shark Attack" is an uptempo track which features references to earlier songs, such as the lyric "another one of those days", which refers to the lyrics of "Break Stuff". "Walking Away", "Loser" and the album's first single, "Shotgun", are noted for featuring guitar solos by Borland, something that Limp Bizkit is not known for. "Shotgun", influenced by heavy metal music, has been described as an anthem by Artistdirect. "Walking Away" is a serene, ambient ballad with introspective lyrics which does not contain any hip hop influence or rapping, in contrast to the sound the band is generally known for, and builds with dramatic solos. "Loser" combines the softer sound of "Walking Away" with rapped verses, and is followed by a heavier track, "Autotunage", featuring Durst singing in autotune, and "90.2.10", which incorporates a thrash influence.

== Critical reception ==
Professional ratings
Aggregate scores
Source	Rating
Metacritic	53/100
Review scores
Source	Rating
About.com	3.5/5 stars
AllMusic	2.5/5 stars
Artistdirect	5/5 stars
Billboard	4/5 stars
Consequence of Sound	3/5 stars
Entertainment Weekly	C−
IGN	7.0/10
Kerrang	3/5 stars
NME	1/10
PopMatters	8/10

According to the review aggregator Metacritic, Gold Cobra received "mixed or average reviews" based on a weighted average score of 53 out of 100 from 11 critic scores. Artistdirect reviewer Rick Florino gave the album 5 out of 5 stars, writing "Gold Cobra is everything you hoped it would be, and rap and metal will be walking funny after it takes a bite out of both them". AllMusic's Stephen Thomas Erlewine gave the album a positive review, calling it "a return to the full-throttled attack of Three Dollar Bill Y'All". Metal Hammer writer Terry Bezer wrote, "Aside from the odd duff moment, Gold Cobra throws out the hot shit that’ll make you bounce in the mosh pit over and over again."

David Buchanan, of Consequence of Sound, called Gold Cobra "an entertaining, boastful, non-alienating piece of nostalgic bliss for those who once held memberships with the LB". In a similar context, Bloody Disgusting writer Jonathan Barkan gave the album a positive review, stating "The album, on a whole, sounds fantastic. [...] It's not Paganini or Opeth or Dream Theater. It's rap rock and it does exactly what it sets out to do." IGN writer Chad Grischow wrote, "Though far from their best work, Limp Bizkit's latest at least proves that their 2005 Greatest Hitz album may have been premature." About.com writer Tim Grierson called Gold Cobra "the group’s strongest since Significant Other".

Entertainment Weekly reviewer Kyle Anderson called the album an "oft-delayed, petulant, and hook-devoid 'comeback' from the onetime champions of early-aughts nü-metal mania. Antiquiet published a negative review which described the album as "music for the sneering scumbags who find kinship in the dregs of cultural rot". The website initially gave the album 1 out of 5 stars. Wes Borland responded to the review, stating "The hatred you have for Fred is part of the reason we've succeeded. [...] No matter what effect he has on people in a ‘TMZ Personality’ kind of way, he is an astonishing front man and performer. I could see 1 out of 5 if you were expecting OK Computer [...] As far as LB records go, Gold Cobra is perfect."

== Commercial performance ==
Gold Cobra charted at No. 16 on the Billboard 200 charts with 27,000 copies sold in the first week in the United States. The album charted on Billboard Albums for the No. 3 Rock Album, No. 11 Digital Album, No. 2 Alternative Album, No. 1 Hard Rock Album and No. 21 Tastemakers Album. In its second week of release overseas Gold Cobra was No. 7 on the Swiss Album Charts, No. 8 on the Austrian Album Charts, No. 24 on the Canadian Albums Chart and No. 1 on the German Albums Chart.

== Track listing ==
All lyrics are written by Fred Durst; all music is composed by Limp Bizkit (Durst, Wes Borland, Sam Rivers, John Otto and DJ Lethal).

No.	Title	Length
1.	"Introbra"	1:20
2.	"Bring It Back"	2:17
3.	"Gold Cobra"	3:53
4.	"Shark Attack"	3:26
5.	"Get a Life"	4:54
6.	"Shotgun"	4:32
7.	"Douche Bag"	3:42
8.	"Walking Away"	4:45
9.	"Loser"	4:53
10.	"Autotunage"	5:00
11.	"90.2.10"	4:18
12.	"Why Try"	2:51
13.	"Killer in You"	3:46
Total length:		49:37

Deluxe version
No.	Title	Music	Length
14.	"Back Porch"	Durst, Boney B.eats	3:22
15.	"My Own Cobain"		3:40
16.	"Angels"		3:20
Total length:			59:57

European iTunes Deluxe version
No.	Title	Length
17.	"Los Angeles"	2:53
Total length:		62:50

HMV/Best Buy Deluxe version
No.	Title	Lyrics	Music	Length
17.	"Middle Finger" (featuring Paul Wall)	Wall, Durst	Mathematics	4:27
Total length:				64:24

Japanese Deluxe version
No.	Title	Music	Length
17.	"Combat Jazz" (featuring Raekwon)	Mathematics	2:37
Total length:			62:34

== Personnel ==
Limp Bizkit

- Wes Borland – guitars
- Fred Durst – vocals, guitars on "Shotgun"
- DJ Lethal – turntables, keyboards, samples, programming
- John Otto – drums
- Sam Rivers – bass

Production

- Cory Durst – photography
- Cliff Feiman – production supervisor
- Dave Schiffman – mixing, recording
- Liam Ward – layout
- Howie Weinberg – mastering
- Boney B.eats – additional production on "Back Porch"
- Hayes – additional production on "Shotgun"
- Wes Borland – cover art design, art direction, illustration
- Fred Durst – producer, art direction

== Charts ==
=== Weekly charts ===
Chart (2011)	Peak position
Australian Albums Chart	12
Austrian Album Chart	2
Canadian Albums Chart	13
Italy	58
German Albums Chart	1
Polish Albums Chart	24
Russian Albums Chart	3
U.S. Billboard 200	16
U.S. Billboard Digital Albums	11
U.S. Billboard Rock Albums	3
U.S. Billboard Alternative Albums	2
U.S. Billboard Hard Rock Albums	1
U.S. Billboard Tastemaker Albums	21

=== Year-end charts ===
Chart (2011)	Position
Austrian Albums Chart	57
German Albums Chart	66
Russian Albums Chart	45

== Certifications and sales ==
Region	Certification	Certified units/sales
Germany (BVMI)	Gold	100,000^{‡}
Russia (NFPF)	Gold	5,000^{*}
^{*} Sales figures based on certification alone.^{‡} Sales+streaming figures based on certification alone.

== Release history ==
Region	Date	Format	Label
Europe	June 24, 2011	CD; digital download	Interscope
United States	June 28, 2011	CD; digital download	Interscope
Japan	June 29, 2011	CD; digital download	Interscope
Brazil	July 19, 2011	CD; digital download	Universal
