= Eat You Alive =

Single by Limp Bizkit

from the album Results May Vary
- Released: September 15, 2003
- Recorded: Summer 2003, Los Angeles
- Genre: Nu metal; alternative metal
- Label: Interscope
- Songwriters: Fred Durst; Sam Rivers; John Otto; Mike Smith
- Producer: Fred Durst

Limp Bizkit singles chronology
"Boiler" (2001)	"Eat You Alive" (2003)	"Behind Blue Eyes" (2003)

Music video
- "Eat You Alive" on YouTube

"Eat You Alive" is a song by the band Limp Bizkit. It was released in September 2003 as a single from their fourth studio album Results May Vary (2003). The song was written by Fred Durst, John Otto, Sam Rivers and Mike Smith, and is Limp Bizkit's first single without Wes Borland, who had left the band in 2001.

== Release and reception ==
In promotion of the single, Durst filmed a music video featuring Thora Birch and Bill Paxton. The single peaked at number 16 on the Billboard Hot Mainstream Rock Tracks chart.

AllMusic gave the single one out of five stars. A 2004 readers poll published by Spin tied "Eat You Alive" with "Headstrong" by Trapt and "Me Against the Music" by Britney Spears as "worst song".

"Eat You Alive" was included on the compilations Greatest Hitz (2005), Collected (2008) and Icon (2011).

== Track listing ==
No.	Title	Length
1.	"Eat You Alive"	4:12
2.	"Shot"	3:47
3.	"Just Drop Dead"	4:04
Total length:		12:03

== Charts ==
Chart (2003)	Peak position
Australia (ARIA)	30
Austria (Ö3 Austria Top 40)	16
Belgium (Ultratop 50 Flanders)	12
Belgium (Ultratop 50 Wallonia)	15
Canada (Billboard)	75
Denmark (Tracklisten)	19
France (SNEP)	16
Germany (GfK)	13
Ireland (IRMA)	27
Italy (FIMI)	20
Netherlands (Single Top 100)	36
New Zealand (Recorded Music NZ)	41
Norway (VG-lista)	17
Poland (ZPAV)	36
Scotland (OCC)	9
Sweden (Sverigetopplistan)	31
Switzerland (Schweizer Hitparade)	31
UK Singles (Official Charts)	10
UK Rock & Metal (OCC)	2
US Alternative Airplay (Billboard)	20
US Mainstream Rock (Billboard)	16
