= Making Love to Morgan Wallen =

Single by Limp Bizkit

from the album Battlefield 6 (Original Video Game Soundtrack)
- Released: September 12, 2025
- Length: 4:09
- Label: Hollywood
- Songwriters: Fred Durst; John Otto; Sam Rivers; Leor Dimant; Wes Borland; Joel Eriksson
- Producer: Fred Durst

Limp Bizkit singles chronology
"Turn It Up, Bitch" (2021)	"Making Love to Morgan Wallen" (2025)

"Making Love to Morgan Wallen" is a song by American nu metal band Limp Bizkit, released by Hollywood Records on September 12, 2025. Written by Fred Durst, John Otto, Sam Rivers, Leor Dimant, Wes Borland, and Joel Eriksson, and produced by Durst, it is the band's first single in 4 years since 2021's "Turn It Up, Bitch", and is the band's final release to feature Rivers before his passing in October 2025.

== Reception ==
Merlin Alderslade of Metal Hammer described "Making Love to Morgan Wallen" as "every bit as Limp Bizkit as you could possibly imagine".

"Making Love to Morgan Wallen" reached number one on the Billboard Hot Hard Rock Songs, Alternative Digital Song Sales, and Hard Rock Digital Song Sales charts, marking their first number one on any Billboard songs chart since 1999's "Re-Arranged".

== Use in other media ==
"Making Love to Morgan Wallen" is featured in the 2025 video game Battlefield 6. This song was also used in EA Sports Madden 26 along with the other Limp Bizkit song Rollin’ (Air Raid Vehicle).

== Charts ==
Chart performance
Chart (2025)	Peak position
Germany Airplay (TopHit)	34
UK Singles Sales (OCC)	67
UK Rock & Metal (OCC)	32
US Digital Song Sales (Billboard)	32
US Hot Rock & Alternative Songs (Billboard)	32
