= Crack Addict =

Song by Limp Bizkit
- Released: March 30, 2003
- Recorded: 2002
- Genre: Nu metal; rap metal
- Length: 4:37
- Songwriter: Fred Durst
- Producers: Fred Durst; DJ Lethal; Al Jourgensen

"Crack Addict" is a song by Limp Bizkit written and recorded in 2002, and produced by Al Jourgensen. The song samples Spoonie Gee's 1979 single, "Spoonin' Rap".

== Production ==
Originally recorded for Results May Vary, the song was even rumored to be an upcoming single; though for unknown reasons the track was omitted from the album.

While working with Limp Bizkit, Al Jourgensen claims that he convinced Fred Durst to strip naked and wear a cowboy hat while singing. Jourgensen recalls, "I got paid to just humiliate him for three songs. It was awesome".

== Legacy ==
On March 7, 2003, Limp Bizkit announced they would be performing live for the first time in two years, at the WWE event, WrestleMania XIX on March 30, 2003. They performed "Crack Addict" and "Rollin' (Air Raid Vehicle)" at the event with Brian Welch and Mike Smith on guitars.

== See also ==
- Limp Bizkit discography
