= Counterfeit (song) =

Single by Limp Bizkit

from the album Three Dollar Bill, Y'all
- B-side: "Nobody Loves Me"
- Released: August 26, 1997
- Studio: Indigo Ranch (Malibu, California)
- Genre: Nu metal; rap metal
- Length: 5:07
- Label: Flip; Interscope
- Songwriters: Wes Borland; DJ Lethal; Fred Durst; John Otto; Sam Rivers
- Producer: Ross Robinson

Limp Bizkit singles chronology
"Counterfeit" (1997)	"Sour" (1998)

Audio sample
- "Counterfeit": file; help

Music video
- "Counterfeit" on YouTube

"Counterfeit" is the debut single by American nu metal band Limp Bizkit, released on August 26, 1997. It is from their debut studio album, Three Dollar Bill, Y'all (1997). Notable for showcasing guitarist Wes Borland's experimental playing style, the song was written by Borland, DJ Lethal, Fred Durst, John Otto and Sam Rivers as a response to local bands that copied Limp Bizkit's style.

"Counterfeit" was the subject of controversy when Interscope Records paid a Portland radio station to play the song fifty times as a paid advertising, sparking payola accusations and criticism of the band and label. In 1999, the song was reissued as another single under the title "Counterfeit Countdown". It also appears on multiple compilations.

In 2022, Eli Enis of Revolver included the song in his list of the "10 Heaviest Nu-Metal Songs of All Time".

== Music and lyrics ==
The song originated from the band's frustrations at the fact that other bands were copying Limp Bizkit's style. According to Borland, "They saw this little thing we built [...] and they were like, 'Oh, let's get baggy pants and dress like kind of hip-hoppy and, you know, play heavy metal and rap.' [...] five or six bands just popped up out of nowhere that became these, you know, groups that were trying to sound like us. It was ridiculous. That's where the song 'Counterfeit' came from."

On the recorded version, Borland played without a guitar pick, performing with two hands, one playing melodic notes, and the other playing chord progressions. Borland's playing featured octave shapes, and choppy, eighth-note rhythms, sometimes accompanied by muting his strings with his left hand, creating a percussive sound. Borland also made use of unevenly accented syncopated sixteenth notes and hypnotic, droning licks to create a disorienting effect.

== Release ==
"Counterfeit" was released as a single in 1997 after the release of Three Dollar Bill, Y'all, and was the first single released from the album. It featured the album versions of the songs "Counterfeit" and "Nobody Loves Me", and a shorter edit of "Counterfeit" intended for radio airplay. A second single of the song was released in 1999 under the title "Counterfeit Countdown", containing three remixes and the album and radio edits of the song.

Interscope Records proposed to the band that the label pay $5,000 to guarantee that Portland radio station KUFO-FM play the song "Counterfeit" fifty times, preceded and concluded with an announcement that the air time was paid for by Interscope. The paid air time was criticized by the media, who saw it as "payola". The band's manager Jeff Kwatinetz later termed the plan as a "brilliant marketing move". Durst stated, "It worked, but it's not that cool of a thing."

== Music video ==
The band filmed a music video for the song depicting a teenage boy with frosted tips who is harassed by others. Unhappy with himself, he cuts his hair short. He then takes his shirt off, and starts to cover himself with a black tar-like substance. He puts on a fly mask, as he continues to cover himself with the tar, with Durst watching him in the background, looking disgusted. The boy then exits his room and comes down the stairs, now mutated into some sort of human fly. He enters the kitchen, where his family simply ignores him. He stands on top of the kitchen table and begins to throw around the food on the table to scare his family away, while eating some of the food.

Alternate music videos for the original song and the "Lethal Dose Extreme Guitar Mix" were also made for the Counterfeit Countdown single, which focuses more on band footage and features a short cameo from Deftones vocalist Chino Moreno.

== Reception ==
The two singles released for the song were received poorly by critics. AllMusic gave the 1997 single two out of five stars. The 1999 reissue, similarly, was also not well received, receiving the same rating from the website as the previous single. Reviewing the 1999 "Lethal Dose Extreme Guitar Mix" by DJ Lethal, AllMusic writer Bradley Torreano criticized DJ Lethal's decision to remove the original music in favor of a hip-hop beat, writing, "[it makes] Durst's shaky lyrics sound that much worse [...] [DJ Lethal] only keeps a little of the original chugging guitar."

In 2001, the "Lethal Dose Extreme Guitar Mix" of the song was included on the remix album New Old Songs. The original version of the song appeared on the compilation albums Greatest Hitz (2005), Collected (2008), and Icon (2011).

In 2022, Louder Sound and Kerrang ranked the song number nine and number eight, respectively, on their lists of Limp Bizkit's greatest songs.

== Cover art ==
The cover art for the Counterfeit Countdown single was produced by Christopher Karl Salat "BeZerk" and M. Figueroa "GONZO247" of the Aerosol Warfare graffiti crew from Houston, Texas. The sculpture was created by "BeZerk" using spray paint cans, clock parts, colored tape and white/red audio chords. The piece is entitled "Aerosol Warfare 2" (US Copyright: VA0001131224) and was displayed by Christopher in many art galleries all over the U.S. before appearing on the single used to promote Limp Bizkit’s song "Counterfeit". The photograph of the sculpture used on the single was taken by "GONZO247" at the “Worship Center”, in Houston’s downtown metropolitan area. Aerosol Warfare was also an underground video documentary about hip hop culture that circulated the underground during the 90's golden age of hip hop. The video kept up with current underground subjects such as; MC/Beatbox battles, graffiti marathons, graffiti artist interviews, breakdancing, and the new styles of the current graffiti movement. Aerosol Warfare is still active in the Arts scene in Houston, Texas.

== Track listing ==
All tracks are written by Wes Borland, DJ Lethal, Fred Durst, John Otto and Sam Rivers.

"Counterfeit" w/ "Nobody Loves Me" (1997)
No.	Title	Length
1.	"Counterfeit" (radio edit)	4:14
2.	"Nobody Loves Me"	4:01
3.	"Counterfeit" (album version)	5:07
Total length:		13:23

"Counterfeit Countdown" (1999)
No.	Title	Length
1.	"Counterfeit" (album version)	5:10
2.	"Counterfeit" (Lethal Dose extreme guitar mix)	3:32
3.	"Counterfeit" (Lethal Dose remix)	3:24
4.	"Counterfeit" (Phat Ass remix)	3:04
5.	"Counterfeit" (USA radio edit)	4:15
