= Nookie (Limp Bizkit song) =

Single by Limp Bizkit

from the album Significant Other
- Released: June 15, 1999
- Genre: Nu metal; rap rock; rap metal
- Length: 4:50 (album version); 4:26 (single version)
- Label: Flip; Interscope
- Composers: Wes Borland; Sam Rivers; John Otto
- Lyricist: Fred Durst
- Producers: Terry Date; Limp Bizkit

Limp Bizkit singles chronology
"Faith" (1998)	"Nookie" (1999)	"Re-Arranged" (1999)

Music video
- "Nookie" on YouTube

"Nookie" is a song by the American nu metal band Limp Bizkit. It was released on June 15, 1999, as the lead single from their second studio album, Significant Other (1999).

== Lyrics and background ==
The song's lyrics have been described as being "not safe for work". In a 2008 interview with British rock magazine Kerrang, guitarist Wes Borland said the following about how the lyrical content turned out: "The music was cool, but I didn't like the lyrics at all. The funny thing is that 'Nookie' was actually the working title. When we were in the studio there was a porn magazine that had the word 'nookie' on the cover, so I was like, 'This song's called Nookie!', I never thought someone would actually run with it. I suppose it's all my fault."

Fred Durst said about the song, "It's about my ex-girlfriend, how she treated me like shit, and I couldn't leave her, wouldn't get over it," he said. "She screwed my friends and used me for my money. I tried to figure out why I did it, and I figured I did it all for the nookie."

== Music video ==
In the music video, filmed in Long Island City, Durst sings the song while walking through city streets drawing a crowd of female followers as he leads them to a secret concert performance of the song in an alley. The band allowed hundreds of fans to participate, playing the song in front of the large crowd. All the guys went to one side of the stage, and the girls on the other side. When Durst sang the chorus at certain parts, he would hold out his microphone to the crowd, getting that particular side to sing. This was, according to Durst, to show that "guys go off hard, but girls go off even harder". At the end of the video, Durst gets arrested and taken away by the police for disturbing the peace.

== Commercial performance ==
"Nookie" made Limp Bizkit extremely popular, helping its parent album Significant Other become certified 7× Platinum by the Recording Industry Association of America (RIAA). It was their first single to chart on the Billboard Hot 100, debuting at number 80 on July 31, 1999 and staying on the chart for 11 weeks. It also went to number 74 on the Radio Songs chart, number six on the Mainstream Rock chart, and number three on the Alternative Songs chart. The song's music video went to number one on MTV's Total Request Live six times during late July and August of 1999. "Nookie" was also the band's first single to chart internationally, reaching #13 in Australia, #33 in New Zealand, and #36 in the Netherlands.

The song gained Limp Bizkit its first Grammy nomination for Best Hard Rock Performance at the 42nd Annual Grammy Awards, which it lost to Metallica's "Whiskey in the Jar".

== Reception ==
Pharrell Williams, while recording N.E.R.D.'s 2008 album Seeing Sounds, cited this song as part of the band's incentive and drive to record more energetic music, noting it as the last energetic hit single before the album's release. According to Stereogum, "aside from the infantile lyrics, the awful rapping, and the yelling, it’s really not that bad of a song". Author Dave Holmes wrote that "Nookie" is "terrible, yet the kids ate it up". In 2022, Louder Sound and Kerrang ranked the song number two and number three, respectively, on their lists of Limp Bizkit's greatest songs.

== Track listing ==
1. "Nookie" – 4:28
2. "Counterfeit" (Lethal Dose Remix) – 3:21
3. "Counterfeit" (Phat Ass Remix) – 3:05
4. "Nookie" (video)
5. "Faith" (video)

== Charts ==
Chart (1999)	Peak position
Australia (ARIA)	13
El Salvador (Notimex)	5
Netherlands (Single Top 100)	36
New Zealand (Recorded Music NZ)	33
US Billboard Hot 100	80
US Alternative Airplay (Billboard)	3
US Mainstream Rock (Billboard)	6

== Certifications ==
Region	Certification	Certified units/sales
New Zealand (RMNZ)	Platinum	30,000^{‡}
United Kingdom (BPI)	Silver	200,000^{‡}
^{‡} Sales+streaming figures based on certification alone.

== Bibliography ==
- Devenish, Colin (2000). Limp Bizkit. Macmillan. ISBN 9781429926546.
- Holmes, Dave (2016). Party of One: A Memoir in 21 Songs. Crown/Archetype. ISBN 9780804187985.
