= Home Sweet Home/Bittersweet Symphony =

"Home Sweet Home / Bittersweet Symphony"

Single by Limp Bizkit

from the album Greatest Hitz
- Released: December 27, 2005
- Recorded: 2005
- Genre: Alternative rock; electronic rock
- Length: 3:52
- Label: Geffen
- Composers: Nikki Sixx; Tommy Lee; Richard Ashcroft
- Producers: Michael Patterson; Fred Durst; Billy Mohler

Limp Bizkit singles chronology
"Behind Blue Eyes" (2003)	"Home Sweet Home / Bittersweet Symphony" (2005)	"Shotgun" (2011)

Music video
- "Home Sweet Home/Bittersweet Symphony" on YouTube

"Home Sweet Home / Bittersweet Symphony", also known as "Bittersweet Home", is a song by American rap rock group Limp Bizkit. It was released in December 2005 as the only single from the compilation album Greatest Hitz. The song is a medley of "Home Sweet Home" by Mötley Crüe and "Bitter Sweet Symphony" by the Verve. It is, along with the songs "Why" and "Lean on Me", the only new content on the Greatest Hitz compilation, and is the third cover song Limp Bizkit has released on an album (the others being the Who's "Behind Blue Eyes" and George Michael's "Faith"). It is also their last single to be released before their three-year hiatus from 2006 to 2009.

== Track listing ==
1. "Home Sweet Home / Bittersweet Symphony"
2. "Head for the Barricade"
3. "The Priest"

== Music video ==
The music video (which is included as a CD-ROM video on the single) is a blend of all the previous Limp Bizkit videos, taking scenes from them, as well as various other footage, including concerts, and backstage footage. At the beginning, however, the video shows a view from space, as the camera moves across the Earth, through a satellite, and finally zooms into Jacksonville, Florida, where the rest of the footage is then shown.

== Charts ==
Chart (2005)	Peak position
Austria (Ö3 Austria Top 40)	44
Denmark (Tracklisten)	33
Finland (Suomen virallinen lista)	31
Germany (GfK)	45
Ireland (IRMA)	35
Italy (FIMI)	38
Netherlands (Single Top 100)	96
Norway (VG-lista)	34
Spain (Promusicae)	33
Sweden (Sverigetopplistan)	40
