= Take a Look Around (song) =

2000 single by Limp Bizkit

Single by Limp Bizkit

from the album Music from and Inspired by Mission: Impossible 2 and Chocolate Starfish and the Hot Dog Flavored Water
- Released: July 3, 2000
- Genre: Nu metal; rap rock; rap metal
- Length: 5:36
- Label: Flip; Interscope
- Songwriters: Fred Durst; Lalo Schifrin
- Producers: Terry Date; Limp Bizkit

Limp Bizkit singles chronology
"Break Stuff" (2000)	"Take a Look Around" (2000)	"My Generation" (2000)

Music video
- "Take a Look Around" on YouTube

"Take a Look Around" (Note: Entitled on the song's cover art as "Take a Look Around (Theme from MI: 2)") is a song by American nu metal band Limp Bizkit. First debuting on the soundtrack to the 2000 film Mission: Impossible 2, it is the first single and tenth track on their third album, Chocolate Starfish and the Hot Dog Flavored Water, and was released on July 3, 2000. The main riff of the song is derived from the original Mission: Impossible theme composed by Lalo Schifrin. In the United Kingdom, "Take a Look Around" was Limp Bizkit's first single release.

The song became a European hit in mid-2000, reaching number one in Iceland and Portugal, number two in Finland and Spain, and number three in Italy and the UK. In addition to reaching the top 10 in several other European countries, it became a top-30 hit in Australia and New Zealand. The song received a Grammy nomination for Best Hard Rock Performance in 2001 but lost to Rage Against the Machine's "Guerrilla Radio". An instrumental version of "Take a Look Around" was released as a promo and later included as a B-side on some versions of the "Rollin'" single.

== Reception ==
In 2022, Louder Sound and Kerrang ranked the song number six and number four, respectively, on their lists of Limp Bizkit's greatest songs.

== Music video ==
The video for the song features the band working undercover at a coffee shop in order to retrieve a disc from a group of secret agents. But just as they are about to succeed, they are ordered to abort the mission, as the secret agents turn out to be decoys. The boys are soon kicked out, and the phone that Fred Durst uses at the beginning blows up right at the end. There are also scenes of the band performing in front of the coffee shop as well as brief shots from Mission: Impossible 2. At the beginning of the video, the song "Break Stuff" can be heard in the car that the band arrives in.

The band decided to release the video only in various markets outside the U.S., particularly Europe. It is not available on either the DVD of Mission: Impossible 2, or the band's DVD compilation Greatest Videoz.

== Track listings ==
UK CD1

1. "Take a Look Around (Theme from MI:2)" (album version) – 5:36
2. "Faith" (George Michael cover) – 3:52
3. "Break Stuff" (CD-ROM video)

UK CD 2

1. "Take a Look Around (Theme from MI:2)" (radio edit) – 4:26
2. "N 2 Gether Now" (live) – 6:37
3. "N 2 Gether Now" (CD-ROM video)

UK cassette single

1. "Take a Look Around (Theme from MI:2)" (radio edit) – 4:24
2. "Take a Look Around (Theme from MI:2)" (album version) – 5:36

European CD single

1. "Take a Look Around (Theme from MI:2)" (album version) – 5:36
2. "Break Stuff" (live) – 4:03

European 7-inch single

A. "Take a Look Around (Theme from MI:2)" (album version)
B. "Faith" (George Michael cover)

Australian CD single and Japanese CD1

1. "Take a Look Around (Theme from MI:2)" (radio edit) – 4:24
2. "N 2 Gether Now" (live) – 4:05
3. "Nookie" (live) – 6:54
4. "N 2 Gether Now" (CD-ROM video) – 3:55

Japanese CD2

1. "Take a Look Around (Theme from MI:2)" (album version) – 5:36
2. "Break Stuff" (live) – 4:03
3. "Break Stuff" (video) – 2:45
4. Screen saver

== Charts ==
=== Weekly charts ===
Chart (2000)	Peak position
Australia (ARIA)	28
Austria (Ö3 Austria Top 40)	4
Belgium (Ultratop 50 Flanders)	10
Belgium (Ultratop 50 Wallonia)	10
Canada Rock/Alternative (RPM)	21
Europe (Eurochart Hot 100)	7
Finland (Suomen virallinen lista)	2
France (SNEP)	16
Germany (GfK)	4
Iceland (Íslenski Listinn Topp 40)	1
Ireland (IRMA)	11
Italy (FIMI)	3
Japan (Oricon)	49
Netherlands (Dutch Top 40)	8
Netherlands (Single Top 100)	7
New Zealand (Recorded Music NZ)	29
Norway (VG-lista)	7
Portugal (AFP)	1
Scottish Singles Sales (Official Charts)	5
Spain (Promusicae)	2
Sweden (Sverigetopplistan)	6
Switzerland (Schweizer Hitparade)	7
UK Singles (Official Charts)	3
UK Rock & Metal (Official Charts)	1
US Bubbling Under Hot 100 (Billboard)	15
US Alternative Airplay (Billboard)	8
US Mainstream Rock (Billboard)	15

=== Year-end charts ===
Chart (2000)	Position
Australia (ARIA)	67
Austria (Ö3 Austria Top 40)	16
Belgium (Ultratop 50 Flanders)	35
Belgium (Ultratop 50 Wallonia)	35
Europe (Eurochart Hot 100)	27
France (SNEP)	61
Germany (Media Control)	39
Iceland (Íslenski Listinn Topp 40)	42
Ireland (IRMA)	64
Netherlands (Dutch Top 40)	46
Netherlands (Single Top 100)	32
Spain (AFYVE)	16
Sweden (Hitlistan)	53
Switzerland (Schweizer Hitparade)	27
UK Singles (OCC)	44
US Mainstream Rock Tracks (Billboard)	51
US Modern Rock Tracks (Billboard)	29

=== Decade-end charts ===
20s Decade-end chart performance
Chart (2025–2026)	Position
Russia Streaming (TopHit)	164

== Certifications ==
Region	Certification	Certified units/sales
Austria (IFPI Austria)	Gold	25,000^{*}
Belgium (BRMA)	Gold	25,000^{*}
Brazil (Pro-Música Brasil)	Gold	30,000^{*}
Finland (Musiikkituottajat)	Gold	5,070
France (SNEP)	Gold	250,000^{*}
Germany (BVMI)	Gold	250,000^{^}
Italy (FIMI)	Gold	50,000^{‡}
New Zealand (RMNZ)	2× Platinum	60,000^{‡}
United Kingdom (BPI)	Platinum	600,000^{‡}
^{*} Sales figures based on certification alone.^{^} Shipments figures based on certification alone.^{‡} Sales+streaming figures based on certification alone.

== Release history ==
Region	Date	Format(s)	Label(s)	Ref(s).
United Kingdom	July 3, 2000	CD; cassette	Flip; Interscope	
Japan	July 19, 2000	CD	Flip; Interscope	
