= The Unquestionable Truth (Part 1) =

EP by Limp Bizkit
- Released: May 2, 2005
- Recorded: October 2004 – February 2005
- Genres: Nu metal; alternative metal; rap metal
- Length: 29:43
- Labels: Flip; Geffen
- Producer: Ross Robinson

Limp Bizkit chronology
Results May Vary (2003)	The Unquestionable Truth (Part 1) (2005)	Greatest Hitz (2005)

The Unquestionable Truth (Part 1) is the first EP and fifth major release overall by American nu metal band Limp Bizkit, released on May 2, 2005, through Flip and Geffen Records. Produced by Ross Robinson, it was the first release by the band since Chocolate Starfish and the Hotdog Flavored Water (2000) to feature guitarist Wes Borland, who rejoined the band in August 2004 following a three-year absence. Drummer John Otto was absent for much of its production, and Sammy Siegler took over drumming duties for the band.

The EP differs from the band's established sound and lyrical subject matter by focusing on darker subjects and featuring a heavier, more experimental sound. Its lyrics focus on subjects such as propaganda, Catholic sex abuse cases, terrorism and fame. Released without advertising and promotion, The Unquestionable Truth (Part 1) sold 37,000 copies during its first week in the United States, peaking at No. 24 on the Billboard 200. Reviews were mixed, but Borland's return to the band was praised, as was the new musical direction, which was considered to be ambitious.

After the release of the full-length album Gold Cobra in 2011, Limp Bizkit signed with Cash Money Records in early 2012. They had planned to release a sequel, titled The Unquestionable Truth (Part 2). However, the band left Cash Money Records in 2014, and never finished the sequel. The band eventually released the full-length album Still Sucks in 2021 instead.

== Music, writing and recording ==
"The Propaganda" (sample)
IGN reviewer Spence D., noting the sinister sound of The Unquestionable Truth (Part 1), described its leading track "The Propaganda" as a "skirling swirl of darkness".

The Unquestionable Truth (Part 1) has been described as nu metal, alternative metal and rap metal. The EP marked a departure from Limp Bizkit's previous releases, featuring a heavier, more experimental sound and focusing on much more serious and ominous lyrical subject matters, including propaganda, Catholic sex abuse cases, terrorism and fame. "The Truth" was strongly influenced from industrial music, while "The Key" features a hip-hop and funk-based sound. "The Surrender" features Fred Durst singing against Sam Rivers' minimalist bass lines and ambiance provided by DJ Lethal. Durst, along with several critics, cited Rage Against the Machine as a musical and lyrical reference point for the EP. In a 2005 interview with MTV News, Durst said: "Emotionally, I was affected a lot by [Rage] ... Not specifically the literal intention of the words or what it was about, but the feel, the sound, those phrases that got me. I believe this [EP] is exactly where they left off." Every song on the EP has their titles beginning with the definite article word "the".

The Unquestionable Truth (Part 1) marked Limp Bizkit's first release since Chocolate Starfish and the Hotdog Flavored Water (2000) to feature guitarist Wes Borland, who parted ways with the band in October 2001. During his three-year absence, the band recorded their next album Results May Vary with Snot guitarist Mike Smith. In August 2004, Durst announced that Borland had rejoined Limp Bizkit and that the band would begin recording a new album later that year. Work on The Unquestionable Truth (Part 1) began in northern California with producer Ross Robinson in October 2004. In February 2005, Durst, Borland and Robinson travelled to Prague to record the EP's vocal tracks, in an apartment located near Charles Bridge. During their month-long stay there, Durst wrote four songs. Sammy Siegler took over drumming duties for the band during much of the EP's production, as John Otto was away in rehab.

== Release ==
The Unquestionable Truth (Part 1) was released on May 2, 2005. Save for the release of a six-minute video clip for "The Truth" on the band's website, it was released as an underground album without any prior advertising, promotion or interviews. This decision, made reportedly at Durst's insistence, drew confused responses from several publications and music industry insiders. Borland also disagreed with the decision, suggesting that it was "self-sabotage": "Maybe he [Durst] was already unhappy with the music, and he didn't really want to put it out there." Durst, on the other hand, was more positive of the EP's no-promotion release: "It felt good to go out there and sell 30 million records and come back and do something that we wouldn't tell anyone about and feel like a real band again that was doing something just because we wanted to do it [...] Instead of Wes coming back and let's shove everything down everyone's throat [sic], let's just do something for us." When Limp Bizkit's career-spanning Greatest Hitz compilation was released in November 2005, Durst was forced by Geffen Records, the band's label, to do interviews to promote the compilation.

Upon release, The Unquestionable Truth (Part 1) sold 37,000 copies during its first week in the United States, peaking at number 24 on the Billboard 200. In its second week, sales reportedly fell by 67%, with only 12,000 copies sold. By August 2008, the EP had sold 93,000 copies in the United States, numbers which were well below those of Limp Bizkit's past releases.

== Critical reception ==
Professional ratings
Review scores
Source	Rating
AllMusic	3/5 stars
The Encyclopedia of Popular Music	3/5 stars
The Essential Rock Discography	5/10
IGN	5.9/10
Kerrang!	2/5 stars
Rock Hard	7.5/10
Rolling Stone	2/5 stars
Stylus	D

The Unquestionable Truth (Part 1) received mixed reviews from critics. AllMusic's Stephen Thomas Erlewine said that the EP's music, which he described as "neo-prog alt-metal", is "a step in the right direction – it's more ambitious, dramatic, and aggressive, built on pummeling verses and stop-start choruses." However, he felt that the band was being "held back" by Durst, who he called "the most singularly unpleasant, absurd frontman in rock."

IGN writer Spence D. wrote, "Given the components of the band—live Limp Bizkit is one tight, intense sonic unit that delivers bristling renditions of their catalog—one would hope that they had chosen to go off the musical deep end and deliver an album that dares to explore rather than rehash. Sadly, only a few brief moments of The Unquestionable Truth (Part 1) exhibit this kind of much needed direction. Here's to hoping that Part 2 expands on the potential hinted at here."

== Track listing ==
No.	Title	Writer(s)	Length
1.	"The Propaganda"	Fred Durst; Wes Borland; Sam Rivers; Sammy Siegler	5:16
2.	"The Truth"	Durst; Borland; Rivers; Siegler	5:28
3.	"The Priest"	Durst; Borland; Rivers; Siegler	4:59
4.	"The Key"	Durst; Borland	1:24
5.	"The Channel"	Durst; Borland; Rivers; John Otto	4:41
6.	"The Story"	Durst; Borland; Rivers; Siegler	3:49
7.	"The Surrender"	Durst	3:59
Total length:			29:43

Sample credits

- "The Key" contains:
  - a sample of "Paris" (Cole Porter, arr. by Jerry Gates), as performed by The Texas Tech Red Raiders Marching Band.
  - a sample of "Soul Ain't No New Thing" (Milton Edwards), as recorded by Boobie Knight & The Soulciety.
  - an interpolation of "Trespasser – Pt. 1" (Arthur Lane).

== Personnel ==
Personnel per liner notes.

Musicians

- Fred Durst – vocals, rhythm guitar on "The Surrender"
- Wes Borland – guitars, harmonica on “The Surrender”
- DJ Lethal – keyboards, samples, programming, sound development
- Sammy Siegler – drums, percussion (except on "The Channel" and "The Surrender")
- John Otto – drums, percussion on "The Channel"
- Sam Rivers – bass

Other personnel

- Wes Borland – cover art
- Ross Robinson – production
- Fred Durst – executive producer
- Jordan Schur – executive producer

== Charts ==
Chart performance
Chart (2005)	Peak position
Australian Albums (ARIA)	50
Austrian Albums (Ö3 Austria)	17
Belgian Albums (Ultratop Flanders)	92
Canadian Albums (Nielsen SoundScan)	23
Dutch Albums (Album Top 100)	85
European Albums (Billboard)	12
French Albums (SNEP)	67
German Albums (Offizielle Top 100)	4
Italian Albums (FIMI)	35
Japanese Albums (Oricon)	7
Polish Albums (ZPAV)	34
Scottish Albums (Official Charts)	66
Spanish Albums (Promusicae)	82
Swiss Albums (Schweizer Hitparade)	8
UK Albums (Official Charts)	71
UK Rock & Metal Albums (Official Charts)	6
US Billboard 200	24
