= Results May Vary =

Studio album by Limp Bizkit
- Released: September 23, 2003
- Recorded: May–June 2003
- Studios: Record Plant (Hollywood); Interscope (Santa Monica); NRG Recording Studios (Hollywood)
- Genres: Nu metal; rap metal; alternative rock; rap rock
- Length: 68:33
- Labels: Flip; Interscope
- Producers: Terry Date; Fred Durst

Limp Bizkit chronology
New Old Songs (2001)	Results May Vary (2003)	The Unquestionable Truth (Part 1) (2005)

Limp Bizkit studio album chronology
Chocolate Starfish and the Hot Dog Flavored Water (2000)	Results May Vary (2003)	Gold Cobra (2011)

Singles from Results May Vary
- 1. "Eat You Alive" Released: September 15, 2003; 2. "Behind Blue Eyes" Released: September 23, 2003

Results May Vary is the fourth studio album by American nu metal band Limp Bizkit. It was released on September 23, 2003, through Flip and Interscope Records. It is the band's only release under the sole-leadership of vocalist Fred Durst after the temporary departure of guitarist Wes Borland, who left in 2001. Guitarist Mike Smith of Snot was brought in to replace Borland, although his time with the band was brief, and Durst along with a number of guests ended up handling the majority of the album's guitar work.

Results May Vary differed from Limp Bizkit's established sound up until that point; although the album still featured elements of hip-hop and nu metal, it also branched out into other musical styles, including alternative rock, acoustic, funk and jazz. It also featured less rapping and more introspective lyrics related to heartbreak, bullying, and self-pity. An alleged affair with Britney Spears by Durst (denied by Spears) during collaborating sessions for her 2003 album In the Zone and resulting rejection by Spears was also cited as an inspiration for some of the album's material. To promote the album, music videos featuring high-profile actors were created for "Eat You Alive" and a cover of the Who's "Behind Blue Eyes"; the former featuring Thora Birch and Bill Paxton and the latter featuring Halle Berry.

Upon its release, Results May Vary peaked at number 3 on the US Billboard 200, selling at least 325,000 copies in its first week of sales. While the album still eventually went platinum, going on to sell at least 1.3 million copies in the United States, both the debut and lifetime sales were still well below prior albums Significant Other (1999) and Chocolate Starfish and the Hot Dog Flavored Water (2000). Results May Vary received mainly negative reviews from critics. It was Limp Bizkit's last studio album released before they went on hiatus for the three years between 2006 and 2009.

== Background and recording ==
In October 2001, Fred Durst posted on the band's website: "Limp Bizkit and Wes Borland have amicably decided to part ways. Both Limp Bizkit and Borland will continue to pursue their respective musical careers. Both wish each other the best of luck in all future endeavors." Borland explained why he left Limp Bizkit; he said: "I could have probably gone on and still played the part of the guitar player of Limp Bizkit, but musically I was kind of bored. If I was to continue, it would have been about the money and not about the true music, and I don't want to lie to myself, or to them or to fans of Limp Bizkit."

According to Durst, Limp Bizkit would "comb the world for the illest guitar player known to man" to replace Borland. After holding a nationwide audition for a new guitarist, "Put Your Guitar Where Your Mouth Is", the band recorded with Snot guitarist Mike Smith. "Mike brought in a breath of fresh air," Durst said. "Creatively, it fit like a glove. It made life easier and more positive. It made us look forward to getting together as a band so much more. The positive effect he had on me just made the whole experience of Limp Bizkit feel like a brand-new entity." Before Smith replaced Borland, Durst originally attempted to write and play a great deal of the guitar tracks before resorting to hire session musician Elvis Baskette to help with writing and recording the majority of the album. Jon Wiederhorn of MTV wrote, "Limp Bizkit jammed with four finalists after their much-publicized guitarist audition tour, but now it looks like Fred Durst might be taking a cue from his Puddle of Mudd pal Wes Scantlin and handling both vocal and guitar duties himself."

After a later falling-out with Smith, Durst told a fansite: "We are the type of people that stay true to our family and our instincts and at any moment will act on intuition as a whole. Mike wasn't the guy. We had fun playing with him but always knew, in the back of our minds, that he wasn't where we needed him to be mentally." Limp Bizkit scrapped many of Smith's sessions, recording another album that was also scrapped.

Before the introduction of Results May Vary's track listing, Page Hamilton of Helmet and Rivers Cuomo of Weezer recorded songs with Limp Bizkit for the album; Al Jourgensen of Ministry also joined the band in the studio. The contributions of all three were omitted from the finished album for unknown reasons. Rappers Jay Z and Bubba Sparxxx both joined Durst in a Los Angeles studio to record various songs respectively, but contributions from either also did not appear on the album. Durst wrote over 30 songs with Limp Bizkit drummer John Otto and the band's bassist, Sam Rivers. During production of Results May Vary, Durst claimed he listened to such artists as the Cure, Patsy Cline, Mazzy Star and classical music for inspiration.

=== Title ===
During production, the album's title changed from Bipolar to Panty Sniffer, and then to Results May Vary. Other working titles were Less Is More, Fetus More, Surrender and The Search for Teddy Swoes. The finished product assembled songs from a number of sessions. On August 20, 2003, Fred Durst posted on the Limp Bizkit website: "The album title is Results May Vary. Like a prescription drug, each persons reaction to the ingredients will be different."

== Music and lyrics ==
"This album is about getting in touch with yourself a little bit, about accepting things a little bit more, maybe accepting the fact that you can't control or change everything and it is the way it is. Sometimes it's about less is more. It's about the seed. Thinking about this gigantic tree that you think is so beautiful but it started with this just seed. So 'less is more' is sort of the theme."

— Durst, explaining what Results May Vary is about

Results May Vary was recorded under the leadership of Durst, who influenced a direction differing from Limp Bizkit's established sound. Although the album is still rooted in nu metal, rap metal and rap rock, it experiments with other genres: mainly alternative rock but also hard rock, jazz, acoustic and funk. The album is more melodic than Limp Bizkit's previous works, has been compared to John Mayer, Bon Jovi, Primus, Linkin Park, Staind and Jane's Addiction (including the Jane's Addiction's album Nothing's Shocking). With a change in the band's sound, Results May Vary has less rapping, more singing and more melody (including power ballads) than previous Limp Bizkit albums. The Observer called the album Limp Bizkit's "safest, most pedestrian-sounding record yet", and Joe D'Angelo of MTV described the album as the band's "most personal album by far", adding it shows Durst "having actual feelings other than rage, angst and conceit under his omnipresent ball cap." Durst described the album as "more sad, more deep, drone-y", and that it demonstrates his "milder, more sensitive streak". Although the songs on Results May Vary are emotional and expressive, screaming is largely absent.

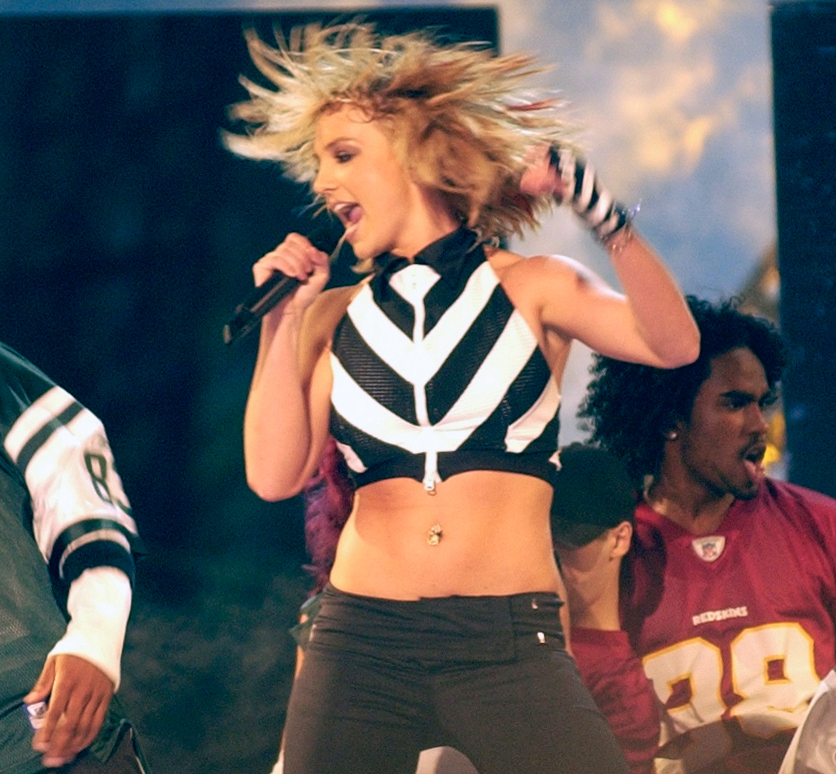
Britney Spears (pictured) initially denied being in a relationship with Durst despite multiple rumors circulating in the media.

Durst's controversy with Britney Spears provided lyrical inspiration for the album. There was rumors him and Spears were in a relationship, with him writing three songs for her 2003 album In the Zone, working on those songs in a studio. After she denied the relationship, he refused to allow those three songs to appear on the album. Results May Vary features a cover of The Who's "Behind Blue Eyes" with a Speak & Spell during the song's bridge. "Gimme the Mic" includes lyrics from the Beastie Boys' "Pass the Mic" and Eric B. & Rakim's "Microphone Fiend", and "Let Me Down" samples Steve Miller's "Take the Money and Run". "Head for the Barricade" borrows from the song "Stick 'Em" by the Fat Boys. "Phenomenon" borrows the line, "Once again back it's the incredible", from "Bring the Noise" by Public Enemy. The album demonstrates Limp Bizkit's gloomy side, with more-serious, less-confident lyrics than previous songs. Lyrical topics include bullying, Durst's past, self-pity, betrayal, childhood pain, heartbreak, feeling misunderstood, love and his views on MTV and radio. About "Down Another Day", Joe D'Angelo of MTV found it difficult to believe that lyrics that were similar to Mayer's could come from Durst, whom, according to him, had recently "likened himself to a chainsaw and threatened to skin your ass raw". "Eat You Alive" was reportedly about Britney Spears (rumored to be involved in an affair with Durst) or Angelina Jolie (whom he admired). According to Durst, "the scream in 'Eat You Alive' is like an animalistic, sexual, crazy, primitive roar", and the desire which came with this behavior. He claimed that "Just Drop Dead" was not (as had been speculated) about Britney Spears, but was inspired by his experience with her and other women, also saying the song is "about a girl who acts like a whore". "Underneath the Gun" is about suicide and the struggle you can have when ending your life becomes an option, according to Durst.

== Critical reception ==
Professional ratings
Aggregate scores
Source	Rating
Metacritic	33/100
Review scores
Source	Rating
AllMusic	1.5/5 stars
Alternative Press	0/5 stars
Entertainment Weekly	C−
The Guardian	2/5 stars
Martin C. Strong	4/10
NME	4/10
The Observer	1/5 stars
Q	4/5 stars
Rolling Stone	3/5 stars
The Rolling Stone Album Guide	3/5 stars

According to the review aggregator Metacritic, Results May Vary received "generally unfavorable reviews" based on a weighted average score of 33 out of 100 from 11 critic scores. This is the third lowest score for an album on Metacritic, with only Bloodhound Gang's Hefty Fine and Kevin Federline's Playing with Fire scoring lower on the site. According to AllMusic reviewer Stephen Thomas Erlewine, "the music has no melody, hooks, or energy, [and] all attention is focused on the clown jumping up and down and screaming in front, and long before the record is over, you're left wondering, how the hell did he ever get to put this mess out?". In a review of Limp Bizkit's Greatest Hitz compilation, Erlewine called "Behind Blue Eyes" the worst in the band's "never-ending series of embarrassing covers". Caroline Sullivan of The Guardian wrote, "Durst's problems are ever-present—and does anybody still care?". Stylus criticized Results May Vary, calling it "an album that can only be described as abysmal". Rob O'Connor of Yahoo! Launch also criticized Results May Vary: "No, Fred, the results don't vary. The results are consistent throughout your new album—consistently crappy." Kitty Empire of The Guardian wrote, "Limp Bizkit have decided to expose their tender side. They really shouldn't have bothered [...] having seen Limp Bizkit's 'other side', you want the old, unapologetic, meathead version back". Scott Mervis of the Pittsburgh Post-Gazette also criticized Results May Vary: "Results May Vary has a few highlights—'Almost Over' (very Everlast) and 'Phenomenon' (very Primus)—but way too few to justify all the time and energy spent".

Although Results May Vary received primarily negative reviews, according to Spin, the album "isn't all that horrible". Some others were not as negative towards the album. Tom Day of MusicOMH wrote, "Ultimately, this album is neither crap nor blindingly good, and results do indeed vary". The Sun-Sentinel gave Results May Vary a positive review, calling Lethal's work "phenomenal", and praising "Behind Blue Eyes" and the soft-to-heavy progression of "Build a Bridge". Steve Appleford of the Chicago Tribune gave Results May Vary a mixed review, writing: "The music achieves some surprising sophistication with new textures both acoustic and electronic. Durst also is not so obnoxious nearly so often; at the same time, his songs too often lack the harsh melodic spark that once turned his ravings into pop hits".

== Commercial performance ==
=== Promotion ===
Durst filmed music videos for "Eat You Alive" and "Behind Blue Eyes" featuring Thora Birch and Halle Berry, respectively. The video for "Eat You Alive" appeared on MTV before Results May Vary was released, and the album was featured on Total Request Live. Limp Bizkit were going to record a music video for Results May Vary's song "Build a Bridge". However, no music video for "Build a Bridge" was recorded. Limp Bizkit performed "Crack Addict" and "Rollin'" during WrestleMania XIX with guitarists Mike Smith and Brian Welch, and "Crack Addict" was played on television commercials for the event. Although "Crack Addict" was the planned first single from Results May Vary, the song was ultimately omitted from the album.

Released on September 23, 2003, Results May Vary peaked at number three on the Billboard 200 with sales of at least 325,000 copies in its first week of being released, ending Limp Bizkit's number-one streak on the chart. This would also be Limp Bizkit's 3rd and final album to enter the Top 10 of the Billboard 200. In three weeks of being released, the album had sold at least 500,000 copies. After thirteen weeks, Results May Vary sold at least 1,000,000 copies. Results May Vary was certified platinum by the Recording Industry Association of America (RIAA) on June 3, 2008 and was certified gold by the British Phonographic Industry (BPI) on October 10, 2003. Results May Vary had sales of 1,337,356 copies in the United States. The album's cover of "Behind Blue Eyes" peaked at number 71 on the Billboard Hot 100, peaked at number 25 on the Mainstream Top 40 chart, and was certified gold by the RIAA on January 26, 2005. "Eat You Alive" peaked at number 16 on the Mainstream Rock chart and number 20 on the Modern Rock Tracks chart, and "Almost Over" peaked at number 33 on the Mainstream Rock chart, despite not receiving a single release. Results May Vary had far less mainstream success than previous Limp Bizkit albums such as Significant Other and Chocolate Starfish and the Hot Dog Flavored Water. Numerous media outlets described the reception of the album as a possible "career killer" for Durst and the band.

=== Touring ===
After the release of Results May Vary, Limp Bizkit joined the band Korn on a tour called the Back 2 Basics Tour. The Back 2 Basics Tour, which was sponsored by Xbox, was scheduled for November 2003. However, during a concert at New York's Hammerstein Ballroom, Durst was hit by an object thrown from the crowd. Durst finished the remaining two songs of Limp Bizkit's set and after the concert, Durst had seven stitches administered by a private physician. During the end of 2003, Limp Bizkit cancelled their tour dates in Southeast Asia after there was a United States Department of State warning of increased security threats abroad. Limp Bizkit planned to play shows in Bali, Bangkok and Manila. However, after a terrorist bombing in Istanbul, Turkey occurred, the United States Department of State issued a travel advisory, and Limp Bizkit cancelled the shows in Southeast Asia. Although they did not perform in Southeast Asia, Limp Bizkit did perform in South Korea and Japan. In January 2004, there were rumors that Limp Bizkit were going to tour with the rock band Kiss, although the band was unable to, citing scheduling conflicts. Wes Borland later rejoined the band in the Spring of 2004, but rumors of tensions arising within the band were still present as American tour dates proved to be unprofitable; leading the band to take an extended European tour through most of 2004.

== Track listing ==
No.	Title	Writer(s)	Producer(s)	Length
1.	"Re-Entry"	Fred Durst; Sam Rivers; John Otto	Terry Date; Fred Durst	2:37
2.	"Eat You Alive"	Durst; Rivers; Otto; Mike Smith	Date; Durst	3:57
3.	"Gimme the Mic"	Durst; Rivers; Otto; Smith	Date; Durst	3:05
4.	"Underneath the Gun"	Durst; Rivers; Otto; Smith	Date; Durst	5:42
5.	"Down Another Day"	Durst; Rivers; Otto	Durst; Rick Rubin (orig.)	4:06
6.	"Almost Over"	Durst; Rivers; Otto; Smith	Date; Durst	4:38
7.	"Build a Bridge"	Durst; Rivers; Otto	Durst; Rubin (orig.)	3:56
8.	"Red Light-Green Light" (featuring Snoop Dogg): "Take It Home"	Durst; Snoop Dogg; DJ Lethal	Durst; DJ Lethal	5:36
9.	"The Only One"	Durst; Rivers; Otto; Smith	Date; Durst	4:08
10.	"Let Me Down"	Durst; Rivers; Otto	Durst; Rubin (orig.)	4:16
11.	"Lonely World"	Durst; Rivers; Otto; Smith	Date; Durst	4:33
12.	"Phenomenon"	Durst; Rivers; Otto; Lethal	Durst	3:59
13.	"Creamer (Radio Is Dead)"	Durst; Rivers; Otto	Durst; Rubin (orig.)	4:30
14.	"Head for the Barricade"	Durst; Rivers; Otto; Smith	Date; Durst	3:34
15.	"Behind Blue Eyes" (The Who cover): "All That Easy"	Pete Townshend	Durst	6:05
16.	"Drown"	Durst; Rivers	Durst; Rubin (orig.)	3:51
Total length:				68:33

Notes

- "Red Light-Green Light" ends at 3:54, while "Behind Blue Eyes" ends at 4:26.

EU edition bonus tracks
No.	Title	Writer(s)	Length
17.	"Shot"	Durst; Otto; Rivers; Smith; Lethal; ^{[A]}	3:45
18.	"Just Drop Dead"	Durst; Otto; Rivers	4:02
Total length:			76:22

iTunes edition bonus tracks
No.	Title	Writer(s)	Length
17.	"All That Easy"	Durst; Lethal	1:32
18.	"Take It Home"	Durst; Lethal	1:41
Total length:			71:48

Japanese edition bonus tracks
No.	Title	Writer(s)	Length
17.	"Let It Go"	Durst; Otto; Rivers; Smith; Lethal; ^{[A]}	5:10
18.	"Armpit"	Durst; Otto; Rivers; Smith; Lethal; ^{[A]}	3:52
Total length:			77:37

== Personnel ==
Limp Bizkit

- Fred Durst – vocals, concept, art direction, cover design, guitar, photography, producer, composer, lyrics
- DJ Lethal – turntables, keyboards, samples, programming, sound development
- Sam Rivers – bass, guitar
- John Otto – drums, percussion, beats
- Mike Smith – guitar

Artwork

- Cory Durst – photography
- Jim Marshall – photography

Additional musicians

- Michael "Elvis" Baskette – engineer, guitar
- Snoop Dogg – vocals on "Red Light–Green Light", lyrics
- Randy Pereira – guitar on "Behind Blue Eyes"
- Brian Welch - guitar on "Build a Bridge"

Production and assistance

- J.D. Andrew – assistant
- Billy Bowers – engineer
- Jason Carson – engineer
- Sergio Chavez – assistant
- Jason Dale – engineer
- Terry Date – engineer, producer
- Cory Durst – photography
- Neal Ferrazzani – assistant
- Dave Holdredge – digital editing, engineer
- Brian Humphrey – assistant
- Jun Ishizeki – assistant
- Aaron Lepley – assistant
- Stephen Marcussen – mastering
- John Morrical – assistant
- Brendan O'Brien – mixing
- Zack Odom – assistant
- Michael Patterson – mixing
- Steve Robillard – assistant
- Rick Rubin – producer
- Andrew Scheps – engineer
- Jordan Schur – executive producer
- Jason Spears – assistant
- Mark Valentine – assistant
- Stewart Whitmore – digital editing
- Ulrich Wild – engineer

== Charts ==
=== Weekly charts ===
Weekly chart performance for Results May Vary
Chart (2003)	Peak position
Australian Albums (ARIA)	2
Austrian Albums (Ö3 Austria)	1
Belgian Albums (Ultratop Flanders)	10
Belgian Albums (Ultratop Wallonia)	18
Canadian Albums (Billboard)	3
Danish Albums (Hitlisten)	6
Dutch Albums (Album Top 100)	11
Finnish Albums (Suomen virallinen lista)	7
French Albums (SNEP)	19
German Albums (Offizielle Top 100)	1
Hungarian Albums (MAHASZ)	26
Italian Albums (FIMI)	7
New Zealand Albums (RMNZ)	2
Norwegian Albums (VG-lista)	10
Portuguese Albums (AFP)	4
Spanish Albums (AFYVE)	13
Swedish Albums (Sverigetopplistan)	10
Swiss Albums (Schweizer Hitparade)	6
UK Albums (Official Charts)	7
US Billboard 200	3

=== Year-end charts ===
2003 year-end chart performance for Results May Vary
Chart (2003)	Position
Australian Albums (ARIA)	75
Austrian Albums (Ö3 Austria)	39
Dutch Albums (Album Top 100)	99
German Albums (Offizielle Top 100)	50
Swiss Albums (Schweizer Hitparade)	55
US Billboard 200	82
Worldwide Albums (IFPI)	40

2004 year-end chart performance for Results May Vary
Chart (2004)	Position
Austrian Albums (Ö3 Austria)	53
German Albums (Offizielle Top 100)	54
Swiss Albums (Schweizer Hitparade)	40
US Billboard 200	135

== Certifications ==
Certifications and sales for Results May Vary
Region	Certification	Certified units/sales
Australia (ARIA)	Platinum	70,000^{^}
Austria (IFPI Austria)	Gold	15,000^{*}
Germany (BVMI)	Gold	100,000^{^}
Japan (RIAJ)	Gold	100,000^{^}
New Zealand (RMNZ)	Gold	7,500^{^}
Russia (NFPF)	Gold	10,000^{*}
Switzerland (IFPI Switzerland)	Gold	20,000^{^}
United Kingdom (BPI)	Gold	100,000^{^}
United States (RIAA)	Platinum	1,000,000^{^} / 1,337,356
^{*} Sales figures based on certification alone.^{^} Shipments figures based on certification alone.
