= Significant Other (album) =

Studio album by Limp Bizkit
- Released: June 22, 1999
- Recorded: November 1998 – February 1999
- Studios: NRG (North Hollywood); Westlake (Los Angeles); D&D (New York City)
- Genres: Nu metal; rap metal
- Length: 62:57
- Labels: Flip; Interscope
- Producers: Terry Date; Limp Bizkit; DJ Premier

Limp Bizkit chronology
Three Dollar Bill, Y'all (1997)	Significant Other (1999)	Chocolate Starfish and the Hot Dog Flavored Water (2000)

Singles from Significant Other
- 1. "Nookie" Released: June 15, 1999; 2. "Re-Arranged" Released: October 12, 1999; 3. "N 2 Gether Now" Released: November 9, 1999; 4. "Break Stuff" Released: May 2, 2000

Significant Other is the second studio album by American nu metal band Limp Bizkit. It was released on June 22, 1999, through Flip and Interscope Records. The album saw the band expand their sound from that of their debut, Three Dollar Bill, Y'all (1997), incorporating further metal and hip-hop influences but with a more melodic and less hardcore punk-influenced sound.

Significant Other was commercially successful, peaking at number one on the US Billboard 200. At least 16 million copies of the album have been sold worldwide. It received generally positive reviews from critics, who noted the band's distinctive sound and performance that was considered an improvement over its predecessor.

The album was nominated for Best Rock Album at the 42nd Annual Grammy Awards, and the lead single "Nookie" was nominated for Best Hard Rock Performance.

== Production ==
Following the radio success of the band's cover of George Michael's "Faith", the band was determined to record the follow-up to their first album in order to show that they were not a "Korn ripoff" or a cover band; the band began writing an album which dealt with issues deriving from their newfound fame. Producer Terry Date, known for working with Pantera, White Zombie and Deftones, was chosen by Limp Bizkit to produce Significant Other. Guitarist Wes Borland stated of Date's production, "he doesn't get overly involved at the 'music' end of things. He's a producer who fools with sound and sonically makes everything perfect. He gets sounds that translate really well on tape and pretty much completely captures what we do, perfectly." The band immediately began recording after the conclusion of the Family Values Tour, despite the insistence of Interscope Records that the band take a break after it.

== Music and lyrics ==
Significant Other has been described as a nu metal and rap metal album. An early version of "I'm Broke" was recorded for Three Dollar Bill, Yall, but was left off the record because of how different the song sounded from the rest of that album's material. The melody for "Trust?" originated from a melody played in rough form in early 1998, during the Ladies Night in Cambodia tour. In response to claims that the lyrics of Three Dollar Bill, Yall were misogynistic, frontman and vocalist Fred Durst toned down his lyrical content on this album, which he described as being more lyrically mature. Durst's breakup with his girlfriend inspired the songs "Nookie" and "Re-Arranged".

Significant Other is Borland's first attempt at using a 7-string guitar, which was inspired by Korn. He was officially endorsed by Ibanez and owned several rare models to record the album including the RG7 CST. He also used a customized Ibanez Musician MC150PW to fit only four strings, creating a baritone guitar to record "Nookie." Sometime in 2000, Borland ended his endorsement with Ibanez and reverted to using 6-string guitars when recording the next album Chocolate Starfish and the Hot Dog Flavored Water.

The band allowed Durst and DJ Lethal to explore their hip hop influences by recording with Method Man. DJ Premier of Gang Starr was brought in to produce the collaboration. The band wanted to record "a track that was straight hip-hop", according to Borland. The song was originally titled "Shut the Fuck Up", but was retitled "N 2 Gether Now" for marketing purposes. Durst also recorded a song with Eminem, "Turn Me Loose", which was left off the album. Durst also recorded a song with System of a Down's vocalist Serj Tankian named "Don't Go Off Wandering". Tankian's vocals only appeared on the demo version of the song, where he sang the bridge and ending chorus, but his vocals do not appear on the album version of the song. The band also collaborated with vocalists Jonathan Davis of Korn and Scott Weiland of Stone Temple Pilots on "Nobody Like You". Weiland would frequently visit NRG Recording Studios and help with the recording, vocally coaching Durst. Staind singer Aaron Lewis provided backup vocals on the song "No Sex", while Scott Borland, Wes' brother, played keyboards on "Just Like This", "Nookie", "Re-Arranged", "I'm Broke", "9 Teen 90 Nine" and "A Lesson Learned". The song "Show Me What You Got" is a sequel to "Indigo Flow" from Three Dollar Bill, Yall. "A Lesson Learned" is a psychedelic trip hop track similar to "Everything" from Three Dollar Bill, Yall.

"Nobody Like You" (sample)
While Limp Bizkit generally opposed solos, they allowed drummer John Otto to perform an extended drum solo in the song "Nobody Like You". This sample also highlights the guest vocals of Korn's Jonathan Davis and Stone Temple Pilots vocalist Scott Weiland.

Describing the album's music, AllMusic's Stephen Thomas Erlewine said that it contains "flourishes of neo-psychedelia on pummeling metal numbers and there are swirls of strings, even crooning, at the most unexpected background." While the band was opposed to solos, they allowed John Otto to perform an extended drum solo in the middle of "Nobody Like You". Scott Borland wrote string melodies for "Don't Go Off Wandering".

The band also recorded interludes featuring celebrity cameos. The first was "Radio Sucks" with MTV VJ Matt Pinfield, in which he rants about "pre-fabricated sorry excuses for singers and musicians who don't even write their own songs" before praising Limp Bizkit for helping launch a musical revolution. The second, "The Mind of Les" featured Primus bass player and singer Les Claypool in what began as an album intro. Claypool stated, "I came in and they wanted me to write some sort of intro for the record. I got stoned and got in front of the mic and started babbling and they ended up not using the intro and using that instead."

== Cover art ==
The album cover depicts a hooded individual with a microphone donning Fred Durst's notorious red Yankees cap and striking a mean pose. American artist Mear One created the cover by painting it on a wall as graffiti. A time-lapse video of the process is featured in the enhanced CD version of Significant Other.

Since its inception, the hooded figure has often been used as Limp Bizkit's logo as seen in subsequent releases by the band, including the albums Results May Vary (2003) and Still Sucks (2021).

== Critical reception ==
Professional ratings
Review scores
Source	Rating
AllMusic	4/5 stars
Christgau's Consumer Guide	(1-star Honorable Mention)
Entertainment Weekly	B
Houston Chronicle	4/5 stars
The Independent	4/5 stars
Los Angeles Times	3/4 stars
NME	3/10
Rolling Stone	3.5/5 stars
The Rolling Stone Album Guide	3.5/5 stars
USA Today	3.5/4 stars

Significant Other received generally positive reviews from critics. Entertainment Weekly reviewer David Browne wrote, "Significant Other isn't simply modern rock; it's postmodern rock." Robert Christgau gave the album an honorable mention and noted the songs "Just Like This" and "N 2 Gether Now" as highlights of the album, writing, "Give their image credit for having a sound." AllMusic's Stephen Thomas Erlewine called the album "considerably more ambitious and multi-dimensional" than the band's previous album, Three Dollar Bill, Yall$.

In later reviews of the album, About.com's Tim Grierson gave the album 4 out of 5 stars, calling it "A buzz saw of bad attitude, metal guitar and white-boy rapping, Limp Bizkit's breakthrough album, Significant Other, is unapologetically rude and immature. But perhaps more importantly, it also rocks very, very hard." Rolling Stone and its album guide awarded the album three and a half out of five stars. A less favorable notice came from author Martin C. Strong, who gave the album 5 out of 10 stars in his book The Essential Rock Discography. In 2014, Revolver magazine said Significant Other was "one of the great guilty-pleasure hard-rock albums of all time", and listed it as one of ten essential nu metal albums "you need to own."

In 2021, it was named one of the 20 best metal albums of 1999 by Metal Hammer magazine. In 2025, Rae Lemeshow-Barooshian of Loudwire included the album in her list of "the top 50 nu-metal albums of all time", ranking it number 5 on the list.

== Commercial performance ==
Significant Other debuted at No. 1 on the Billboard 200, selling 643,874 copies in its first week of release. In its second week of release, the album sold an additional 335,000 copies. The band promoted the album by appearing at Woodstock 1999 and headlining the year's Family Values Tour. Durst directed music videos for the songs "Re-Arranged" and "N 2 Gether Now".

== Controversy ==
Violent action sprang up during and after Limp Bizkit's performance at Woodstock 1999, including fans tearing plywood from the walls during a performance of the song "Break Stuff". Several sexual assaults were reported in the aftermath of the concert. Durst stated during the concert, "People are getting hurt. Don't let anybody get hurt. But I don't think you should mellow out. That's what Alanis Morissette had you motherfuckers do. If someone falls, pick 'em up. We already let the negative energy out. Now we wanna let out the positive energy". Durst later stated in an interview, "I didn't see anybody getting hurt. You don't see that. When you're looking out on a sea of people and the stage is twenty feet in the air and you're performing, and you're feeling your music, how do they expect us to see something bad going on?" Claypool told the San Francisco Examiner, "Woodstock was just Durst being Durst. His attitude is 'no press is bad press', so he brings it on himself. He wallows in it. Still, he's a great guy."

Durst saw the band as being scapegoated for the event's controversy. He later stated that the promoters of Woodstock '99 were at fault for booking his band, due to their reputation for raucous performances. While the performance was the subject of much controversy, the violence did not affect sales of Significant Other. The video for "Re-Arranged" would refer to the controversy, with the band being subjected to a fictitious court trial over the events of the concert.

== Track listing ==
All lyrics are written by Fred Durst, except where noted; all music is composed by Wes Borland, Sam Rivers and John Otto, except where noted.

No.	Title	Lyrics	Music	Length
1.	"Intro"			0:38
2.	"Just Like This"			3:34
3.	"Nookie"			4:50
4.	"Break Stuff"			2:48
5.	"Re-Arranged"			5:56
6.	"I'm Broke"			4:00
7.	"Nobody Like You" (featuring Jonathan Davis and Scott Weiland)	Durst; Jonathan Davis; Scott Weiland		4:20
8.	"Don't Go Off Wandering"			4:01
9.	"9 Teen 90 Nine"			4:36
10.	"N 2 Gether Now" (featuring Method Man)	Clifford Smith; Durst	Chris Martin	4:50
11.	"Trust?"			4:59
12.	"No Sex" (featuring Aaron Lewis)		Borland; Rivers; Otto; Brendan O'Brien	3:57
13.	"Show Me What You Got"			4:28
14.	"A Lesson Learned"			2:39
15.	"Outro" (includes hidden tracks (Note: "Outro" ends at 1:55 on the compact disc release. The first hidden track, "Radio Sucks" featuring Matt Pinfield, begins at 2:25 and ends at 4:06. A second hidden track, "The Mind of Les" featuring Les Claypool, begins at 4:37. On the digital version, "Outro" and "Radio Sucks" are separated tracks (with "Radio Sucks" renamed to "Rant (Matt Pinfield)") and "The Mind of Les" is omitted.))			7:21
Total length:				62:57

Bonus disc version (tracks 1–3 recorded live at Family Values Tour 1999 and released on the album "The Family Values Tour 1999")
No.	Title	Length
1.	"Break Stuff" (Live)	4:02
2.	"Re-Arranged" (Live)	4:55
3.	"Nookie" (Live)	6:42
4.	"Break Stuff" (CD-Rom Video)	2:47
Total length:		18:26

== Personnel ==
=== Limp Bizkit ===
- Fred Durst – vocals, producer (tracks 1–9; 11–15)
- Wes Borland – guitars, artwork, producer (tracks 1–9; 11–15)
- DJ Lethal – turntables, keyboards, producer (tracks 1–9; 11–15)
- John Otto – drums, producer (tracks 1–9; 11–15)
- Sam Rivers – bass, producer (tracks 1–9; 11–15)

=== Additional musicians ===
- Method Man – vocals on "N 2 Gether Now"
- Les Claypool – spoken word on hidden track
- Matt Pinfield – spoken word on hidden track
- Anita Durst – guitar and vocals on hidden track
- Mathematics – voiceover on phone messages on "I'm Broke"
- Scott Borland – keyboards
- Jonathan Davis – vocals on "Nobody Like You"
- Aaron Lewis – backing vocals on "No Sex"
- Scott Weiland – backing vocals on "Nobody Like You"

=== Production ===
- Terry Date – producer (tracks 1–9; 11–15), co-producer (track 10)
- DJ Premier – producer (track 10)
- Brendan O'Brien – mixing
- Mear One – cover art

== Charts ==
=== Weekly charts ===
Chart (1999–2001)	Peak position
Australian Albums (ARIA)	5
Austrian Albums (Ö3 Austria)	7
Belgian Albums (Ultratop Flanders)	7
Canadian Albums (Billboard)	1
Dutch Albums (Album Top 100)	11
Finnish Albums (Suomen virallinen lista)	16
French Albums (SNEP)	70
German Albums (Offizielle Top 100)	13
Hungarian Albums (MAHASZ)	27
Irish Albums (IRMA)	33
New Zealand Albums (RMNZ)	4
Norwegian Albums (VG-lista)	28
Scottish Albums (Official Charts)	8
Swedish Albums (Sverigetopplistan)	49
Swiss Albums (Schweizer Hitparade)	38
UK Albums (Official Charts)	10
US Billboard 200	1

=== Year-end charts ===
Chart (1999)	Position
Australian Albums (ARIA)	38
Belgian Albums (Ultratop Flanders)	98
US Billboard 200	9

Chart (2000)	Position
Australian Albums (ARIA)	21
Austrian Albums (Ö3 Austria)	29
Belgian Albums (Ultratop Flanders)	13
Canadian Albums (Nielsen SoundScan)	52
Dutch Albums (Album Top 100)	43
Europe (European Top 100 Albums)	81
German Albums (Offizielle Top 100)	41
New Zealand Albums (RMNZ)	18
US Billboard 200	22

Chart (2001)	Position
UK Albums (OCC)	85
US Billboard 200	192

=== Decade-end charts ===
Chart (1990–1999)	Position
US Billboard 200	83

Chart (2000–2009)	Position
US Billboard 200	118

== Certifications ==
Region	Certification	Certified units/sales
Argentina (CAPIF)	Gold	30,000^{^}
Australia (ARIA)	2× Platinum	140,000^{^}
Austria (IFPI Austria)	Gold	25,000^{*}
Belgium (BRMA)	Gold	25,000^{*}
Canada (Music Canada)	6× Platinum	600,000^{^}
Germany (BVMI)	Gold	250,000^{^}
Japan (RIAJ)	Gold	100,000^{^}
Mexico (AMPROFON)	Platinum	150,000^{^}
Netherlands (NVPI)	Platinum	100,000^{^}
New Zealand (RMNZ)	Platinum	15,000^{^}
Switzerland (IFPI Switzerland)	Gold	25,000^{^}
United Kingdom (BPI)	Platinum	300,000^{*}
United States (RIAA)	7× Platinum	7,000,000^{^}
Summaries
Europe (IFPI)	Platinum	1,000,000^{*}
^{*} Sales figures based on certification alone.^{^} Shipments figures based on certification alone.
