= Three Dollar Bill, Y'all =

Studio album by Limp Bizkit
- Released: July 1, 1997
- Recorded: November 1996 – February 1997
- Studio: Indigo Ranch (Malibu, California)
- Genres: Nu metal; rap metal; rapcore
- Length: 61:27
- Labels: Flip; Interscope
- Producers: Ross Robinson; Limp Bizkit

Limp Bizkit chronology
Three Dollar Bill, Y'all (1997)	Significant Other (1999)

Singles from Three Dollar Bill, Y'all
- 1. "Counterfeit" Released: August 26, 1997; 2. "Sour" Released: March 17, 1998; 3. "Faith" Released: October 31, 1998 (promotional)

Three Dollar Bill, Y'all (stylized as Three Dollar Bill, Yall$) is the debut studio album by American nu metal band Limp Bizkit. It was released on July 1, 1997, through Flip and Interscope Records. The album established the band's trademark sound with the singles "Counterfeit", which was influenced by hip hop and heavy metal, and "Faith", a cover of the 1987 song of the same name by George Michael.

Three Dollar Bill, Y'all was produced by Ross Robinson, who was introduced to the band through Korn bassist Reginald "Fieldy" Arvizu, who persuaded Robinson to listen to Limp Bizkit's demo. Robinson was impressed by the band's motivation and sound, and agreed to work with them. The album showcased an intentionally abrasive, angry sound which the band felt would attract a fanbase.

== Background ==
Wes Borland left Limp Bizkit preceding a successful performance opening for Korn at the Dragonfly in Hollywood due to a disagreement with Fred Durst. Soon after, Limp Bizkit signed with Mojo, a subsidiary of MCA Records. While heading to California to record their first album, the band's van was involved in a major crash whilst they were driving through Texas. The near-death experience encouraged Durst to phone Borland to put their differences aside. After a dispute with Mojo, Limp Bizkit signed with Flip, a subsidiary of Interscope Records.

Reginald "Fieldy" Arvizu of the fellow nu metal band Korn persuaded Ross Robinson to listen to the band's demo, which consisted of the songs "Pollution", "Counterfeit" and "Stalemate". Robinson finally listened to the tape after it was praised by Robinson's girlfriend. Robinson was impressed by the band's motivation and sound, and produced their debut, which was recorded at Indigo Ranch. During the recording of Three Dollar Bill, Y'all, the band recorded an early version of their song "I'm Broke", but it was decided that the song didn't fit on the album. It was subsequently reworked and recorded for their second studio album, Significant Other, released in 1999.

Continuing the band's policy of using titles that would hopefully repulse potential listeners, the band named the album by using part of the phrase "queer as a three dollar bill" and adding the word "Y'alls" (in possessive form) at the end to embody Florida slang into the title, consequently giving the album the name Three Dollar Bill, Y'all$.

== Music and lyrics ==
"Counterfeit"
"Counterfeit" is a response to other bands copying Limp Bizkit's style and people who change who they are to fit in.

"Nobody Loves Me"
This breakdown from the song "Nobody Loves Me" was inspired by the band Tool. Limp Bizkit vocalist Fred Durst imitates the singing style of Maynard James Keenan in this sample.

"Pollution", according to Durst, is about people who say the band's music is "nothing but noise pollution. There's nothing particularly heavy there. No big-time message." In a Q&A, Durst said about the song: "It's like, well, you're preaching and telling me that I'm so wrong—well, that's noise to me because little do you know that my band says a prayer every time before they go on stage and we're not just praying to Buddha or something."

Limp Bizkit was inspired to write "Counterfeit" after local bands began to copy their style. According to Borland, "They saw this little thing we built [...] and they were like, 'Oh, let's get baggy pants and dress like kind of hip-hoppy and, you know, play heavy metal and rap.' [...] five or six bands just popped up out of nowhere that became these, you know, groups that were trying to sound like us. It was ridiculous. That's where the song 'Counterfeit' came from." Durst said "Counterfeit" is about people who try to fit in and change who they are.

Fred Durst's problems with his girlfriend inspired him to write the song "Sour".

The mood and tone set by Robinson in the studio allowed the band to improvise; a recording of the band improvising appeared as the last track on the album, "Everything". "Everything" is the longest song on the album at over sixteen minutes in length. The recording of the album also allowed the band to showcase the addition of DJ Lethal, and experimental guitar playing by Borland, who played without a guitar pick, performing with right hand fingers.

On the song "Stuck", Borland used a sustain pedal in the first bar, and muted riffs in the second bar. Borland's playing on this album features octave shapes, and choppy, eighth-note rhythms, sometimes accompanied by muting his strings with his left hand, creating a percussive sound. Borland also made use of unevenly accented syncopated sixteenth notes and hypnotic, droning licks to create a disorienting effect.

Despite the success of live performances of the band's cover of George Michael's song "Faith", Robinson was opposed to recording the cover, and tried to persuade the band not to play it on the album. However, the final recording, which incorporated heavier guitar playing and drumming, as well as DJ scratching, impressed Robinson. Robinson also bonded with Borland, who Robinson perceived as not taking the band seriously.

American rock band Tool provided a strong influence in shaping the album's sound, particularly in the song "Nobody Loves Me", which contains a breakdown in which Durst copied the singing of Maynard James Keenan and the intro which has elements of Undertow hidden track "Disgustipated". Durst said "Nobody Loves Me" is about his mother: "When my mom used to ground me and I got upset, she'd say, 'Oh, nobody loves me. I'm going to go eat worms.' So it was like this saying that I used to get pounded with by my mother. She had this little cross-snitch on the wall that said 'Nobody loves me. Everybody hates me. I think I'll go eat worms.' Here's how I look at it: since nobody loves me, I don't owe you a thing."

"Indigo Flow", named after the studio Three Dollar Bill, Y'all was recorded in (Indigo Ranch Studio), was Limp Bizkit's gratitude toward those who helped the band get a record deal and make music professionally.

The completed album featured an abrasive, angry sound which Borland later stated was part of Limp Bizkit's plan to get noticed. "The best way to get our message across is through shock value. That's what grabs people [...] getting people to react by showing something negative, hoping something positive will come out of it. Trying to stay in reality." Three Dollar Bill, Y'all has been described as nu metal, rap metal, and rapcore.

== Release, touring and promotion ==
Three Dollar Bill, Y'all was released by Interscope Records on July 1, 1997. Between September and October 1997, Limp Bizkit opened for Faith No More on the American leg of their Album of the Year Tour, which was the group's final tour before their break up the following year. Despite citing Faith No More as an influence, guitarist Wes Borland has spoken of how touring with them was a negative experience for the band, with Faith No More's fans booing Limp Bizkit off stage at several shows. He said, "The idea of it was cool, we were really excited about it, about the idea of opening for Faith No More. But once we got there, it was a really tough crowd. They have a really tough crowd to please, who are very vocal about not liking you. We opened for Faith No More and Primus in the same year, and the Primus tour went a lot better than the Faith No More tour. I did not get to know Mike Patton on that tour, I got to know him later [through Adam from Tool]." At one show opening for Faith No More, Fred Durst referred to the audience as "faggots" when they started booing Limp Bizkit. Following this show, Durst apologized to Faith No More's keyboardist Roddy Bottum, who, unbeknownst to him, had come out as gay in the early 1990s. At another show with Faith No More, bassist Sam Rivers was so frustrated at the booing that he ended up smashing his instrument at the end of their set. In October 1997, the Hartford Courant gave Limp Bizkit's live shows a negative review, writing "In 1997, seeing some twentysomething kid sputter and curse about his problems just isn't very shocking — or very interesting." Between March and June 1997, before the album's release, Limp Bizkit had toured North America and Europe with Korn and Helmet, two other artists they cite as influences. This was also Helmet's last tour before their initial break up the following year, with DJ Lethal having earlier collaborated with them on the 1993 song "Just Another Victim", when he was in House of Pain.

The music video for "Counterfeit" was released in 1997 and played on music channels like The Box and M2. Limp Bizkit performed on MTV's 1998 Spring Break special Fashionably Loud, which brought the band attention. A music video was later made for the single "Sour". Durst directed a music video for the band's single "Faith" in promotion for its appearance in the film Very Bad Things, but was unsatisfied with it, and directed a second video which paid tribute to tourmates like Primus, Deftones, and Mötley Crüe, who appeared in the video. The music video for "Faith" received heavy rotation on MTV and ended up on the MTV show Total Request Live. The album's popularity grew in 1999 as the band's mainstream profile began to increase. In March of that year, it went platinum in the United States, and it eventually went double platinum in July 2001. As of October 1999, Three Dollar Bill, Y'all sold 1.8 million copies in the United States, according to Nielsen SoundScan.

== Controversy ==
In 1998, controversy came about when it was revealed Interscope paid $5,000 to guarantee that a radio station in Portland, Oregon play the song "Counterfeit" 50 times, preceded and concluded with an announcement that the air time was paid for by Interscope. The paid air time was criticized by the media, who saw it as "payola". However, payola specifically refers to songs played on the radio in which they are not disclosed as paid air time. Jeff Kwatinetz, the band's manager, later termed the plan as a "brilliant marketing move". Durst stated, "It worked, but it's not that cool of a thing." The payola controversy hurt Limp Bizkit's image. Despite criticism, the paid air time did not increase sales, which stood at only 170,000 in early 1998. Much of the album's resulting sales instead came from consistent touring by the band.

Three Dollar Bill, Y'all received controversy for its lyrical content, with the lyrics often being labeled as misogynistic. Durst said: "That's because I said the words 'whore' and 'bitch'. My whole record is about my girlfriend who put me through the wringer for three years and my insecurity about it. It became this big thing." Durst also said: "Somebody may hear the word 'bitch' on our songs, but I love women. I will always be ready for my soul mate to fall into my lap. So those people who think it's derogatory towards women are the people that aren't listening to the words."

== Critical reception ==
Professional ratings
Review scores
Source	Rating
AllMusic	3.5/5 stars
Christgau's Consumer Guide	(dud)
The Encyclopedia of Popular Music	3/5 stars
The Essential Rock Discography	7/10
Kerrang!	4/5 stars
Metal Hammer	4/5 stars
The Rolling Stone Album Guide	2/5 stars
Tom Hull – on the Web	B+

Three Dollar Bill, Y'all received mixed to positive reviews from critics. A June 1997 review from the Gavin Report stated, "Limp Bizkit has created a sound that will fast be incorporated into the hard rock genre—let's call it grindhop. Even if the name doesn't stick, Limp Bizkit will still appeal to anyone with an ear for innovative music." Stephen Thomas Erlewine of AllMusic praised the album in his retrospective review, writing "They might not have many original ideas [...] but they do the sound well. They have a powerful rhythm section and memorable hooks, most of which make up for the uneven songwriting." In The Essential Rock Discography, Martin Charles Strong gave the album a 7 out of 10 rating. Robert Christgau gave the album a negative review. Borland stated in an interview that George Michael, the writer of the song "Faith", hated Limp Bizkit's cover and "hates us for doing it". Durst, however, said: "I heard that he loves the song. We asked him to perform 'Faith' with us on New Year's, but George thought he might come off looking funny. I wouldn't make fun of him." In 2020, Three Dollar Bill, Y'all was named one of the 20 best metal albums of 1997 by Metal Hammer. Metal Hammer also included it on their 2022 list of the "10 essential rap metal albums". Despite publicly expressing his disdain for nu metal and his personal dislike of Durst, Megadeth frontman Dave Mustaine spoke very positively about Three Dollar Bill, Y'all, praising Borland's guitar work and the musicianship. In 2021, the staff of Revolver included the album in their list of the "20 Essential Nu-Metal Albums".

== Track listing ==
All lyrics are written by Fred Durst, except "Faith" by George Michael; all music is composed by Limp Bizkit (Wes Borland, DJ Lethal, Durst, John Otto and Sam Rivers), except "Faith" by Michael.

No.	Title	Length
1.	"Intro"	0:48
2.	"Pollution"	3:52
3.	"Counterfeit"	5:07
4.	"Stuck"	5:24
5.	"Nobody Loves Me" ( (Note: "Nobody Loves Me" is stylized as "Nobody ♡'s Me" on the back of physical editions.))	4:27
6.	"Sour"	3:32
7.	"Stalemate"	6:14
8.	"Clunk"	4:03
9.	"Faith" (George Michael cover (Note: The original release contains a hidden track titled "Blind". On some digital editions such as Spotify, the hidden track "Blind" is omitted from "Faith".))	3:52
10.	"Stink Finger"	3:03
11.	"Indigo Flow"	2:23
12.	"Leech" (demo version)	2:11
13.	"Everything"	16:27
Total length:		61:27

== Personnel ==
Personnel taken from Three Dollar Bill Y'All CD booklet.

=== Limp Bizkit ===
- Wes Borland – guitars
- DJ Lethal – turntables, samples
- Fred Durst – vocals, art direction
- John Otto – drums
- Sam Rivers – bass

=== Additional musicians ===
- Scott Borland – keyboards (tracks 1, 2, 6)

=== Production ===
- Ross Robinson – producer
- Limp Bizkit – producer, art direction
- Richard Kaplan – engineer
- Rob Agnello – assistant Engineer
- Andy Wallace – mixing at Soundtrack Studio (New York City)
- Steve Sisco – assistant mixer
- Howie Weinberg – mastering at Masterdisk (Peekskill, New York)
- Tom Simpson – media
- Jordan Schur – executive producer
- John Otto (Flip) – layout

== Charts ==
=== Weekly charts ===
Year	Chart	Position
1998	US Heatseekers	1
1999	US Billboard 200	22
1999	US Catalog Albums	1
1999	Canadian Albums Chart	29

=== Year-end charts ===
Chart (1999)	Peak position
US Billboard 200	56

== Certifications ==
Region	Certification	Certified units/sales
Australia (ARIA)	Gold	35,000^{^}
Canada (Music Canada)	Platinum	100,000^{^}
United Kingdom (BPI)	Gold	100,000^{^}
United States (RIAA)	2× Platinum	2,000,000^{^}
^{^} Shipments figures based on certification alone.
