= John Otto (drummer) =

American drummer (born 1977)

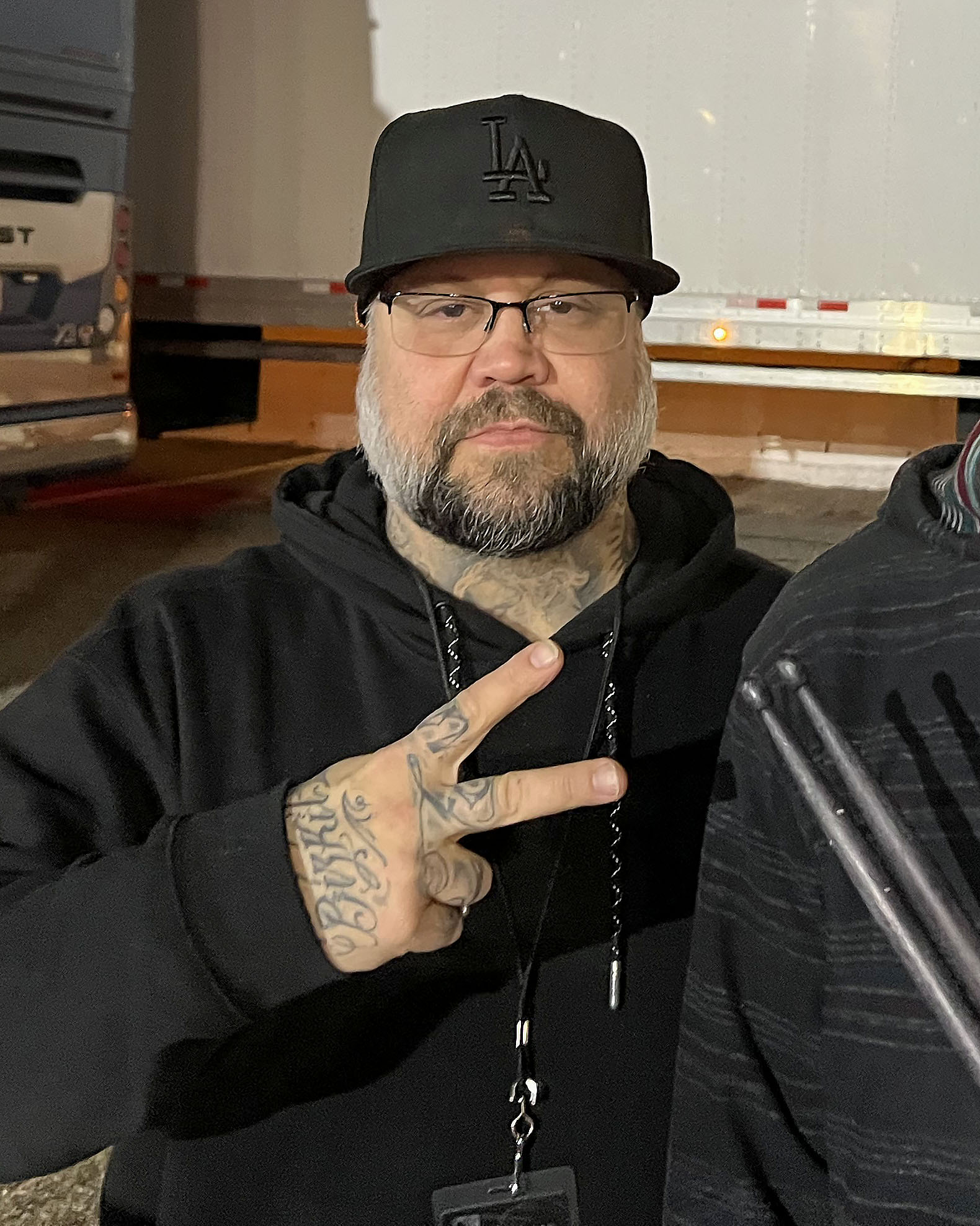
- Otto in 2022

Background information
- Born: March 22, 1977 (age 49); Jacksonville, Florida, U.S.
- Genres: Nu metal; funk metal; rap metal; rap rock
- Occupation: Musician
- Instrument: Drums
- Years active: 1994–present
- Member of: Limp Bizkit

John Everett Otto (born March 22, 1977) is an American musician best known as the drummer and a founding member of the nu metal band Limp Bizkit. Modern Drummer reported that Otto's playing is "grounded in metal, jazz, and hip-hop [and that his] fireball rhythms are the grease that makes the Bizkit cook."

== Biography ==
=== Limp Bizkit ===
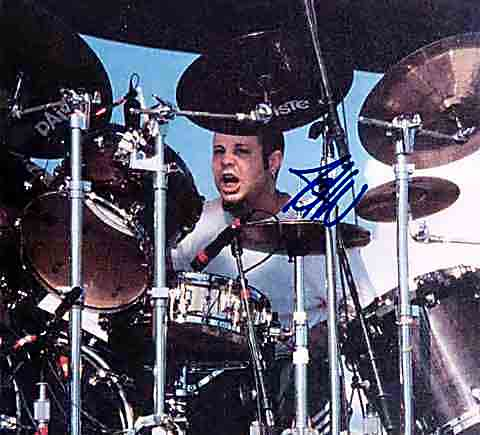
Otto with Limp Bizkit in 1996

Otto studied jazz drumming at the Douglas Anderson School of the Arts and played in local avant-garde bands before joining Limp Bizkit, which was being formed by Fred Durst and Sam Rivers. What started as a small band from Jacksonville, Florida quickly became one of the most popular bands in the world, selling over 40 million records worldwide. Otto would join the band after being recommended by Rivers.

In November 2004 rumors began to surface about Otto having left Limp Bizkit. These rumours derived from the fact that new pictures of him had not shown up on the band's official site for several months. Rumors also arose that Otto had become a Benedictine monk. This was addressed by Durst in a post on the band's website titled "People are Dumb". Durst did not address the topic directly; he chose to give subliminal hints that Otto was indeed still in the band. Pictures of Otto later surfaced on the band's website, disproving the rumors.

Otto wrote and recorded drums for all the tracks for The Unquestionable Truth (Part 1), but without his knowledge, the band had Sammy Siegler record drums for the EP. The other band members and the producer made the decision as to which drummer would be on the final release. The EP featured Siegler on six tracks, and Otto on one ("The Channel", which he also co-wrote). Otto stated that Siegler is a good punk drummer, but that Siegler failed to achieve the stylistic groove imprint that is unique to Otto's playing and also the backbone of Limp Bizkit. The band released the EP and the Greatest Hitz compilation in 2005, then went on hiatus the following year. Otto resumed working with Limp Bizkit on their comeback world tour in 2009, which featured the band's original lineup.

=== Other activities ===
Otto has a rap career under the name 'Johnny Ottomatic'. He released several tracks on his MySpace, along with the Sun Zoo rap group, which also features rapper L.A. Jay. Otto later formed a new rap group Stereo Chemix, which featured Ceekay, DJ Apokalypze, Finbar and Norm aka NC3. The group released their debut music video on their Myspace. Otto later worked with San Jose alternative metal act Fishnoise on their debut EP "Four Dollar Bill, Y'all". Otto produced and performed drums on rapper Diabolic's song "Riot" on the latter's 2010 debut album. He also played drums on all tracks on The Killer and the Star's debut album, which was a solo project of Cold frontman Scooter Ward.

In May 2022, Otto and his daughter Ava performed on the first series of reality television show Come Dance with Me.

Otto lived in Marina del Rey, California and later in Santa Clarita, California.

== Style and influences ==
Otto is adept in drumming in a variety of styles ranging from Brazilian and Afro-Cuban music to bebop and funk.

Otto endorses Orange County Drum and Percussion, Zildjian cymbals and sticks, Remo drumheads and Gibraltar hardware. Prior to endorsing Gibraltar, he was a longtime endorser of Pearl hardware.

== Discography ==
Limp Bizkit

- Three Dollar Bill, Y'all (1997)
- Significant Other (1999)
- Chocolate Starfish and the Hot Dog Flavored Water (2000)
- Results May Vary (2003)
- Gold Cobra (2011)
- Still Sucks (2021)

The Killer and the Star

- The Killer and the Star (2009)
