= Sam Rivers (bassist) =

American bassist (1977–2025)

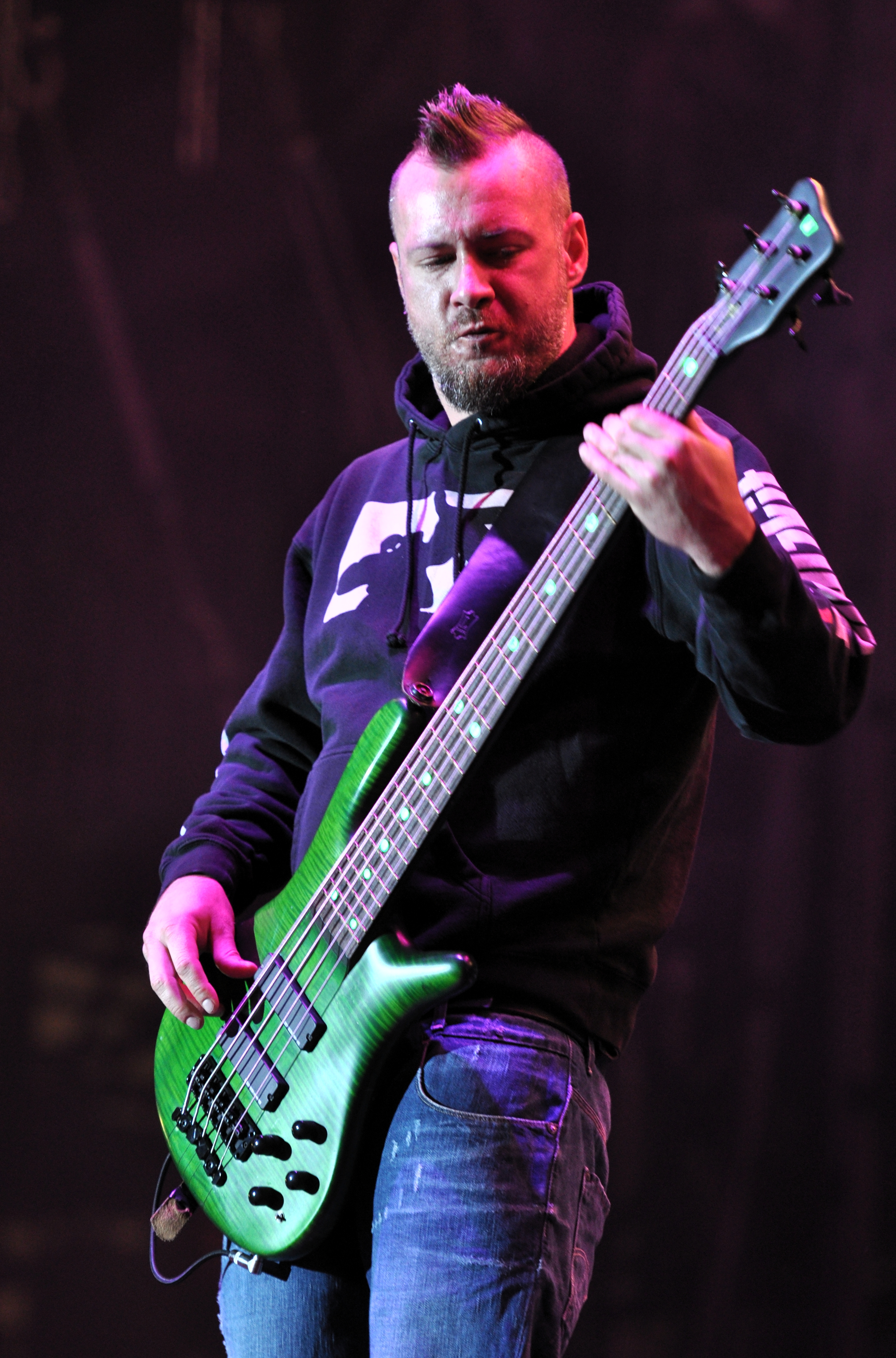
- Rivers performing with Limp Bizkit in 2013

Background information
- Born: September 2, 1977; Jacksonville, Florida, U.S.
- Died: October 18, 2025 (aged 48) St. Johns County, Florida, U.S.
- Genres: Nu metal; rap rock; rap metal; alternative metal
- Occupation: Musician
- Instruments: Bass; vocals; guitar
- Years active: 1994–2025
- Formerly of: Limp Bizkit; Sleepkillers; Malachi Sage

Samuel Robert Rivers (September 2, 1977 – October 18, 2025) was an American musician. He was the bassist, backing vocalist and one of the founding members of the nu metal band Limp Bizkit.

== Early life ==
Rivers' musical career started fairly early on, with him playing the tuba in a band in Arlington Middle School. He got into music initially because his friend John Otto played jazz-style drums.

Many had said that Otto was a cousin of Rivers, but during a documentary that was recorded of the band recording their second album, Rivers admitted that they initially thought they were cousins but realized neither parents were related.

He attended Bishop Kenny High School. He started playing guitar before switching to bass at the suggestion of his music teacher.

== Career ==
=== Limp Bizkit ===
Rivers first met Fred Durst while working at a Chick-fil-A in a mall in Jacksonville. The two started talking, and found they shared several interests, including skateboarding and music. They decided to get together for a jam session. Rivers was becoming an accomplished bass guitarist, and Durst was to be a vocalist. Together with several other people they formed a short-lived band called Malachi Sage.

When the band did not work out, the two decided to try again, and this time Otto came into the picture to be the drummer at the suggestion of Rivers. In 1994, the three formed Limp Bizkit. Later on, Borland came into the fold, as well as DJ Lethal, in 1996. Rivers was the youngest member of the band. When their first album Three Dollar Bill, Yall was released, he was 19 years old. Limp Bizkit went on to become one of the defining bands of the nu metal genre.

On Limp Bizkit's Results May Vary album, Rivers subbed in on guitar on some tracks in the absence of guitarist Wes Borland.

In 2015, Rivers reportedly left Limp Bizkit following a diagnosis of degenerative disc disease. However, Rivers revealed in 2020 his departure from Limp Bizkit was due to liver disease caused by excessive drinking. Rivers subsequently received a liver transplant. In absentia, live bass duties were covered by Samuel Gerhard Mpungu and Tsuzumi Okai.

He was voted Best Bass Player at the 2000 Gibson Awards.

=== Later work ===
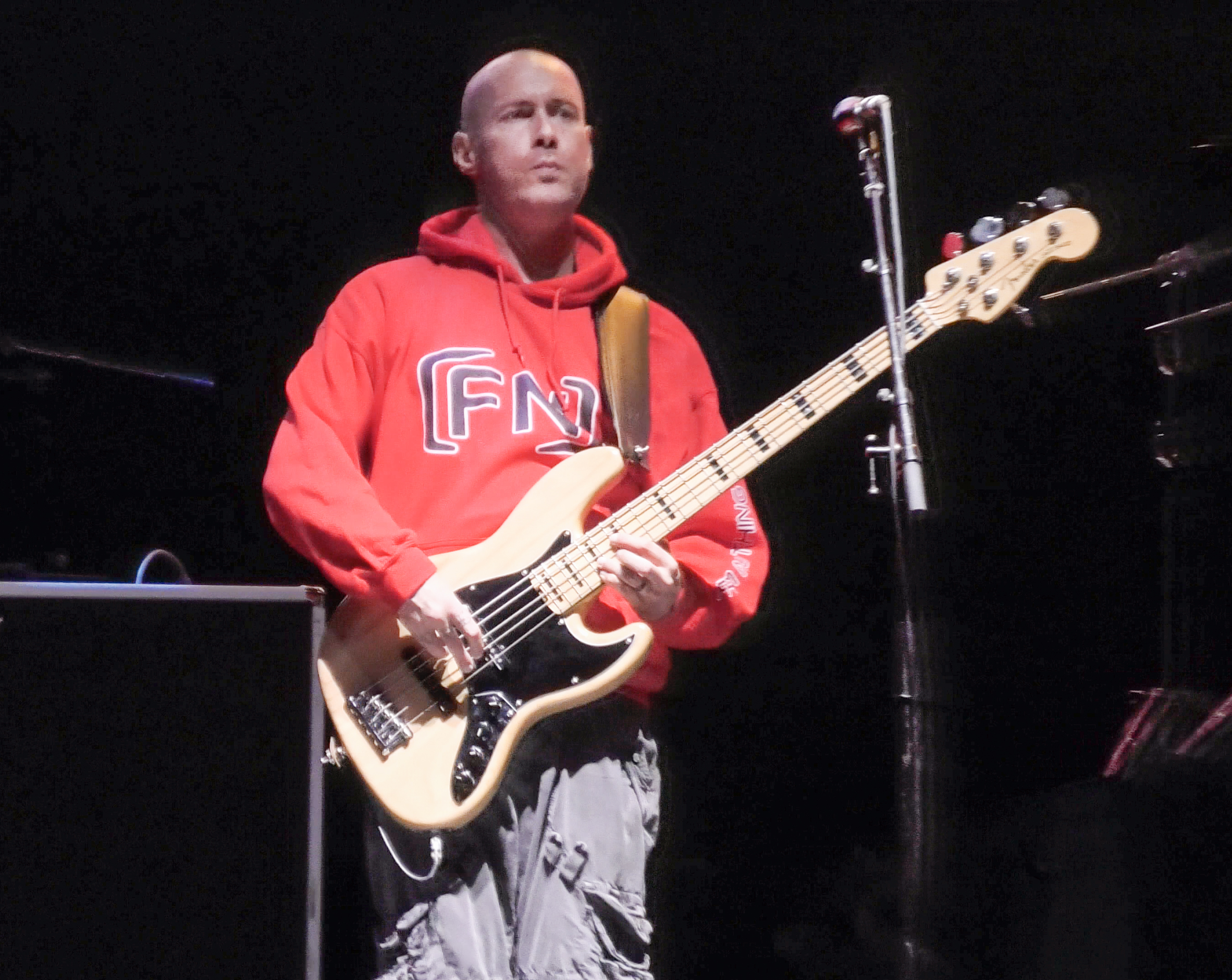
Rivers performing at KROQ Weenie Roast 2019

After Limp Bizkit went on hiatus, Rivers became a producer for local bands in Jacksonville. He produced the debut albums by Burn Season and The Embraced. More recently, Rivers had been producing for the Orlando-based band Indorphine. Aside from producing their new studio material, Rivers got them booked as the opening act for a Mushroomhead/SOiL concert. He was invited to Christian Olde Wolbers' Arkaea project, but dropped out due to scheduling.

In early 2009, Rivers reunited with Limp Bizkit for tours and recorded two more albums with the band, Gold Cobra (2011) and Still Sucks (2021).

Rivers pursued another project with Burn Season vocalist Damien Starkey in a band called Sleepkillers, along with Adam Latiff and Saliva vocalist Bobby Amaru, who was also a founding member and drummer for Burn Season. They released their self titled debut album in March 2019.

Rivers' last musical performance would be with Limp Bizkit at the Leeds Festival in Leeds, England on August 24, 2025.

== Death ==
Rivers died on October 18, 2025, at the age of 48 in his home in Florida. His death was announced by Limp Bizkit on social media. By the time of his death, Rivers had been working on new music with Limp Bizkit. To handle live duties, the band enlisted Richie "Kid Not" Buxton as their touring bassist.

== Collaborations ==
- Marilyn Manson ft. Sam Rivers – "Redeemer" (Queen of the Damned: Music from the Motion Picture)
- David Draiman ft. Sam Rivers – "Forsaken" (Queen of the Damned: Music from the Motion Picture)
- Black Light Burns ft. Sam Rivers – "I Have a Need" (Cruel Melody)
