= Flip Records (1994) =

Californian record label

Flip Records, LLC
- Genre: Nu metal; rock
- Founded: April 1994
- Founder: Jordan Schur
- Fate: Inactive
- Successor: Suretone Records
- Headquarters: California, United States

Flip Records is a Californian record label, started by Jordan Schur in April 1994. The label is known for the signing of popular nu metal bands such as Limp Bizkit, Dope and Cold. The label has sold 70 million albums worldwide.

== History ==
Flip Records was founded by Jordan Schur in April 1994, who was looking to set up a record label of musical acts playing "hard rock with pop sensibilities". Schur left his family's import-export business to start the label, and initially received US$2 million in financial capital. Flip was originally headquartered in West Broadway, New York.

Flip's first release was the self-titled debut album by Big Hate, released in January 1996, and the label's releases were initially distributed by Ichiban Records before the label went bankrupt in 1998. Flip Records' first major label-distributed release was Comic Book Whore by Jane Jensen, which was initially released in October 1996 before Interscope Records picked the album up and re-released it in 1997. Jensen later left Flip and Interscope in 1998 due to conflicts over her creative direction.

In 1997, Limp Bizkit signed to Flip Records, after deciding against signing to Mojo Records. The band's debut album, Three Dollar Bill, Y'all, was financed by Schur and released as a joint partnership with Interscope; it became Flip Records' first successful album, selling over 1.8 million copies in the United States by 1999. Thanks to its success, Schur was able to cut Flip a number of distribution deals with other major labels for its acts, including Epic (Dope) and A&M (Big Hate) between 1997 and 1998. Limp Bizkit's frontman, Fred Durst, was also responsible for signing Cold (with A&M) and Staind (with Elektra) to Flip in 1997 and 1998, respectively.

In October 1999, Schur became the president of Geffen Records following the UMG-PolyGram merger. Subsequently, he left his position as head of Flip Records, but continued to retain ownership of the label and worked with their acts. As a result of this deal, Flip's subsequent signings were largely distributed through Interscope-Geffen-A&M Records. Flip Records became the first record label to achieve over one million album sales of a rock music album in its first week in October 2000, with the release of Limp Bizkit's Chocolate Starfish and the Hot Dog Flavored Water.

After Schur was ejected from his position at Geffen Records in 2006, Flip Records became inactive as Schur moved on to Suretone Records. The Flip label name was still used regardless on releases by Staind (The Illusion of Progress and Staind) and Limp Bizkit (Gold Cobra) up to 2011; since then, the label has not released any new material.

== Alumni ==
- Big Dumb Face
- Big Hate
- Cold
- Dope
- Fine
- Go! Dog! Go!
- The Hotheads
- Jane Jensen
- Limp Bizkit
- Marcy
- Staind

== See also ==
- List of record labels
- Suretone Records
