= Cold discography =

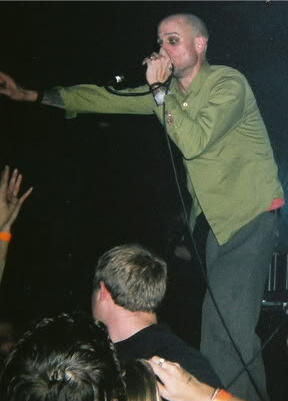
- Frontman Scooter Ward in 2009
- Studio albums: 6
- EPs: 3
- Singles: 13
- Music videos: 13
- Promotional singles: 15

The American rock band Cold has released six studio albums, four extended plays, fourteen singles, fifteen promotional singles and fourteen music videos.

== Studio albums ==
List of studio albums, with selected chart positions and certifications
| Title | Album details | Peak chart positions | | | | Sales | Certifications |
| Title | Album details | US | US Alt. | US Rock | UK | Sales | Certifications |
|---|---|---|---|---|---|---|---|
| Cold | Released: January 20, 1998; Label: Flip/A&M; Formats: CD, CS, digital download | — | — | — | 146 | US: 39,778+ | |
| 13 Ways to Bleed on Stage | Released: September 12, 2000; Label: Flip/Geffen; Formats: CD, digital download | 98 | — | — | 85 | US: 467,000+ | RIAA: Gold |
| Year of the Spider | Released: May 13, 2003; Label: Flip/Geffen; Formats: CD, digital download | 3 | — | — | 144 | US: 533,000+ | RIAA: Gold |
| A Different Kind of Pain | Released: August 30, 2005; Label: Flip/Lava; Formats: CD, digital download | 26 | — | — | — | | |
| Superfiction | Released: July 19, 2011; Label: SonicStar/Eleven Seven; Formats: CD, LP, digital download | 37 | 10 | 10 | — | | |
| The Things We Can't Stop | Released: September 13, 2019; Label: Napalm; Formats: CD, LP, digital download | — (Note: Although The Things We Can't Stop did not enter the Billboard 200, it reached number 34 on the Billboard Top Album Sales chart.) | 11 | 15 | — (Note: Although The Things We Can't Stop did not enter the UK Albums Chart, it reached number 34 on the UK Independent Album Breakers Chart.) | | |
"—" denotes a recording that did not chart or was not released in that territory.

== Extended plays ==
List of extended plays
| Title | EP details |
|---|---|
| Oddity EP | Released: 1998; Label: Flip; Formats: CD |
| Project 13 | Released: 2000; Label: Flip; Formats: CD |
| Something Wicked This Way Comes | Released: 2000; Label: Geffen; Formats: CD |

== Singles ==
List of singles, with selected chart positions, showing year released and album name
| Title | Year | Peak chart positions | | | | | Album |
| Title | Year | US | US Alt. | US Main. Rock | US Rock | UK | Album |
|---|---|---|---|---|---|---|---|
| "Go Away" | 1998 | — | — | — | × | 91 | Cold |
| "Give" | 1998 | — | — | — | × | 83 | Cold |
| "Just Got Wicked"^{[A]} | 2000 | — | — | 25 | × | — | 13 Ways to Bleed on Stage |
| "Confession"^{[A]} | 2000 | — | — | — | × | — | 13 Ways to Bleed on Stage |
| "No One" | 2000 | — | 13 | 17 | × | — | 13 Ways to Bleed on Stage |
| "End of the World" | 2001 | — | — | 24 | × | — | 13 Ways to Bleed on Stage |
| "Bleed" | 2001 | — | — | — | × | — | 13 Ways to Bleed on Stage |
| "Gone Away" | 2002 | — | — | 28 | × | — | Year of the Spider |
| "Stupid Girl" | 2003 | 87 | 6 | 4 | × | — | Year of the Spider |
| "Suffocate" | 2003 | — | 21 | 17 | × | — | Year of the Spider |
| "Wasted Years" | 2003 | — | — | — | × | — | Year of the Spider |
| "Happens All the Time" | 2005 | — | 29 | 21 | × | — | A Different Kind of Pain |
| "A Different Kind of Pain" | 2006 | — | 38 | 35 | × | — | A Different Kind of Pain |
| "Wicked World" | 2011 | — | — | 21 | 50 | — | Superfiction |
| "American Dream" | 2012 | — | — | — | — | — | Superfiction |
| "Emily" | 2012 | — | — | — | — | — | Superfiction |
| "Delivering the Saint" | 2012 | — | — | — | — | — | Superfiction |
| "Flight of the Superstar" | 2012 | — | — | — | — | — | Superfiction |
| "Shine" | 2019 | — | — | — | — | — | The Things We Can't Stop |
| "Without You" | 2019 | — | — | — | — | — | The Things We Can't Stop |
| "The Devil We Know" | 2019 | — | — | — | — | — | The Things We Can't Stop |
| "Run" | 2019 | — | — | — | — | — | The Things We Can't Stop |
| "We All Love" | 2019 | — | — | — | — | — | The Things We Can't Stop |
| "Quiet Now" | 2020 | — | — | — | — | — | The Things We Can't Stop |
| "Check Please" | 2020 | — | — | — | — | — | Non-album single |
"—" denotes a recording that did not chart or was not released in that territory. "×" denotes periods where charts did not exist or were not archived.

== Music videos ==
List of music videos, showing year released and director
| Title | Year | Director(s) | Album |
|---|---|---|---|
| "Go Away" | 1998 | Josh Evans | Cold |
| "Give" | 1998 | Peter Christopherson | Cold |
| "Just Got Wicked" | 2000 | Marc Webb | 13 Ways To Bleed On Stage |
| "No One" | 2001 | Fred Durst | 13 Ways To Bleed On Stage |
| "End of the World" | 2001 | Jacques Rey | 13 Ways To Bleed On Stage |
| "Bleed" | 2001 | Fred Durst | 13 Ways To Bleed On Stage |
| "Gone Away" (Version 1) | 2002 | —N/a | Year of the Spider |
| "Gone Away" (Version 2) | 2002 | Atom Rothlein | Year of the Spider |
| "Stupid Girl" | 2003 | Marc Webb | Year of the Spider |
| "With My Mind" | 2004 | Marc Webb | Psi-Ops Soundtrack |
| "Happens All the Time" | 2005 | Zach Merck | A Different Kind Of Pain |
| "Wicked World" | 2011 | Blake Judd | Superfiction |
| "American Dream" | 2012 | —N/a | Superfiction |
| "Without You" | 2019 | William McHale | The Things We Can't Stop |
| "Run" | 2019 | Matthew Cowan | The Things We Can't Stop |
| "Quiet Now" | 2020 | Alex Schroer | The Things We Can't Stop |
