= Flip Records (1994) discography =

American record label discography

This is the discography of Flip Records, an American record label founded in April 1994 by Jordan Schur. The discography of Flip Records consists of 23 studio albums, 3 greatest hits albums, two extended plays and one remix album. Schur negotiated split 50/50 agreements with a variety of major labels to distribute the label's artists, including Interscope, Geffen, A&M, Elektra, Atlantic, Roadrunner and Epic.

The discography of Flip Records has sold a combined total of 70 million albums worldwide as of 2017. Limp Bizkit is Flip's best selling artist, having sold over 40 million albums worldwide whilst on the label.

== Studio albums ==
List of studio albums, with selected chart positions, sales figures and certifications (as of 2022)

Year	Artist / Band	Release	Release date	Distributor	Billboard 200 position	Sales	Music certifications	Cite
1996	Big Hate	Big Hate	January 23, 1996	Ichiban	—			
1996	Go! Dog! Go!	Engine 7"	March 22, 1996	Ichiban	—			
1996	Jane Jensen	Comic Book Whore	October 1, 1996	Interscope	—			
1996	The Hotheads	World Wide Vibe	October 22, 1996	Ichiban	—			
1997	Marcy	Marcy	February 25, 1997	Ichiban	—			
1997	Limp Bizkit	Three Dollar Bill, Yall	July 1, 1997	Interscope	22	US: 1,800,000	RIAA: 2× Platinum; ARIA: Gold; BPI: Gold; MC: Platinum	
1998	Cold	Cold	June 2, 1998	A&M	—	US: 39,778		
1998	Big Hate	You're Soaking In It	September 1998	A&M	—			
1999	F.I.N.E.	Against The View	February 23, 1999	Elektra	—			
1999	Staind	Dysfunction	April 13, 1999	Elektra	74	US: 1,126,000	RIAA: 2× Platinum	
1999	Limp Bizkit	Significant Other	June 22, 1999	Interscope	1	US: 7,237,123; WW: 16,000,000	RIAA: 7× Platinum; ARIA: 2× Platinum; BPI: Platinum; BVMI: Gold; IFPI AUT: Gold; IFPI SWI: Gold; MC: 6× Platinum; NVPI: Platinum; RMNZ: 2× Platinum	
1999	Dope	Felons and Revolutionaries	September 14, 1999	Epic	—	US: 236,000		
2000	Cold	13 Ways to Bleed on Stage	September 12, 2000	Geffen	98	US: 500,000	RIAA: Gold	
2000	Limp Bizkit	Chocolate Starfish and the Hotdog Flavoured Water	October 17, 2000	Interscope	1	US: 8,000,000; UK: 889,000	RIAA: 6× Platinum; ARIA: 5× Platinum; BPI: 3× Platinum; BVMI: Gold; IFPI AUT: Platinum; IFPI SWI: Platinum; MC: 6× Platinum; NVPI: Platinum; RMNZ: 5× Platinum	
2001	Big Dumb Face	Duke Lion Fights the Terror!!	March 6, 2001	Geffen/Flawless	194			
2001	Staind	Break The Cycle	May 8, 2001	Elektra	1	US 5,300,000	RIAA: 5× Platinum; ARIA: Gold; BPI: Platinum; BVMI: Gold; MC: 2× Platinum; RMNZ: 2× Platinum	
2001	Dope	Life	November 6, 2001	Epic	180	US: 73,000		
2001	Limp Bizkit	New Old Songs	December 4, 2001	Interscope	26		RIAA: Gold; BPI: Gold	
2003	Cold	Year of the Spider	May 13, 2003	Geffen	3	US: 533,000	RIAA: Gold	
2003	Staind	14 Shades of Grey	May 20, 2003	Elektra	1	US: 1,400,000	RIAA: Platinum; MC: Gold	
2003	Limp Bizkit	Results May Vary	September 23, 2003	Interscope	3	US: 1,337,356	RIAA: Platinum; ARIA: Platinum; BPI: Gold; BVMI: Gold; IFPI AUT: Gold; IFPI SWI: Gold; RMNZ: Platinum	
2005	Limp Bizkit	The Unquestionable Truth (Part 1)	May 2, 2005	Geffen	24	US: 88,000		
2005	Staind	Chapter V	August 9, 2005	Atlantic	1	US: 986,000	RIAA: Platinum	
2005	Cold	A Different Kind of Pain	August 30, 2005	Lava	26			
2005	Limp Bizkit	Greatest Hitz	November 4, 2005	Geffen	47		ARIA: Gold; BPI: Gold; BVMI: Gold; IFPI AUT: Gold; MC: Gold; NVPI: Gold; RMNZ: Gold	
2006	Staind	The Singles: 1996–2006	November 14, 2006	Atlantic	41			
2008	Staind	The Illusion of Progress	August 19, 2008	Atlantic/Roadrunner	3	US: 318,724		
2011	Limp Bizkit	Gold Cobra	June 28, 2011	Interscope	16	US: 77,000		
2011	Limp Bizkit	Icon	July 19, 2011	Interscope	—			
2011	Staind	Staind	September 13, 2011	Atlantic/Roadrunner	5			
"—" denotes a recording that did not chart or was not released in that territory.

== See also ==
- Flip Records (1994)
