= Idiot Pilot discography =

- Studio albums: 2
- Extended plays: 5
- Singles: 2
- Music videos: 4

The following is the complete discography of the American alternative rock/electronica duo Idiot Pilot.

== Albums ==
=== Studio albums ===
| Year | Album details |
|---|---|
| 2005 | Strange We Should Meet Here: Label: Clickpop/Reprise; Producer: Idiot Pilot, Paul Turpin, Chip Westerfield, Dave Richards |
| 2007 | Wolves: Label: Reprise; Producer: Ross Robinson, Mark Hoppus |
| 2019 | Blue Blood: Label: Self-released |

=== Extended plays ===
| Year | Title |
|---|---|
| 2002 | A Silent Film: Released: 2002; Label: Self-released |
| 2005 | To Buy a Gun: Released: October 3, 2005; Label: Reprise |
| 2005 | Strange We Should Meet Here (Remixes): Released: October 4, 2005; Label: Reprise |
| 2007 | Cruel World Enterprise: Released: September 5, 2007; Label: Reprise |
| 2008 | Heart Is Long: Released: March 18, 2008; Label: Reprise |

== Singles ==
| Year | Title | Album |
|---|---|---|
| 2006 | "A Day in the Life of a Poolshark" | Strange We Should Meet Here |
| 2010 | "The Tail of a Jet Black Swan" | The Tail of a Jet Black Swan |

== Music videos ==
| Year | Title | Director |
|---|---|---|
| 2005 | "To Buy a Gun" | |
| 2006 | "A Day in the Life of a Poolshark" | Shafei & Levitz |
| 2007 | "Retina and the Sky" | Adam Egypt Mortimer |
| 2007 | "Planted in the Dark" | |
| 2010 | "Tail of a Jet Black Swan" | Micah Knapp |
| 2019 | "Saboteur" | |
| 2019 | "Only So Much" | |
