= The Killer and the Star (album) =

The Killer and The Star

Studio album by The Killer and the Star
- Released: July 14, 2009
- Genres: Experimental, Alternative Rock
- Label: SonicStar Records
- Producer: Ross Robinson

Singles from The Killer and The Star
- 1. "Starts When You Fall" Released: 2009

The Killer and The Star is the only album from Cold frontman Scooter Ward's side project The Killer and the Star. It was released July 14, 2009 and had been in the works since 2006 when Cold disbanded. It was originally set to be titled The Series of Emotion.

== Track listing ==
No.	Title	Length
1.	"Living With Musicians"	3:40
2.	"Hallelujah"	4:22
3.	"Starts When You Fall"	3:55
4.	"Symphony For a Mad World"	4:48
5.	"End of Summer"	4:11
6.	"The Low"	4:06
7.	"Questions"	4:45
8.	"The Avenue"	5:38
9.	"Angel Falls"	4:20
10.	"One Fine Line"	6:14
