= Behold! A Pale Horse =

Studio album by The Ghost and the Grace
- Released: July 6, 2009
- Genre: Indie folk Indie rock
- Length: 53:51
- Label: Self-released
- Producer: Daniel Anderson

Behold! A Pale Horse is the debut album of the Bellingham, Washington, band The Ghost and the Grace, a moniker for the founder/creator Daniel Anderson (of Idiot Pilot fame). The album is based loosely on the concept of death and dying.

== Track listing ==
No.	Title	Length
1.	"What Have I Done?"	3:58
2.	"How Far You Go"	4:00
3.	"Cloud of Flies"	4:07
4.	"The End"	3:52
5.	"Antlion"	4:08
6.	"A Pretty Good Place To Start"	3:53
7.	"Genetics"	3:49
8.	"Nevada"	3:33
9.	"Unfortunately, That's Life"	3:41
10.	"My Shell Is Broken"	4:18
11.	"We Should Get Back Into Books"	4:11
12.	"The Angry Youth March"	3:34
13.	"After All"	6:39

== Personnel ==
Taken from CD liner:

- Daniel Anderson - Vocals, banjo, guitar, bass, mandolin, piano, keyboard, percussion, programming, accordion, glockenspiel, vibraphone, string and horn arrangements
- Chip Westerfield - Additional guitar on "Cloud of Flies"and "My Shell Is Broken", and additional bass on "How Far You Go" and "The End"
- Ryan Soukkala - Additional percussion
- Stephanie Warmouth - Additional vocals on "The End"
- Produced by Daniel Anderson
- Co-produced by Chip Westerfield
- Mixed and recorded at Bayside Recording, Bellingham, Washington, and Anderson's home, Bellingham, Washington, by Daniel Anderson and Chip Westerfield
- Engineering by Daniel Anderson
- Additional engineering by Chip Westerfield
- Mastered by Paul Turpin at Bayside Recording, Bellingham, Washington
- Creative direction and design by Karl Peterson.
