= The Killer and the Star =

American musical solo project

- Origin: Jacksonville, Florida, U.S.
- Genres: Alternative rock, experimental rock
- Years active: 2006–2009
- Label: SonicStar Records
- Members: Scooter Ward

The Killer and the Star was a musical side project started by American musician Scooter Ward, frontman of the band Cold.

== History ==
Originally named "The Witch", the band name was changed to "When November Falls" in November 2006, before any work had been done. In March 2008 the band again changed its name to its final name, "The Killer and The Star". Five demos were put out on the band's MySpace player: "My Heart", "Symphony for a Mad World", "Let the Rain Begin", "Questions" and "Starts When You Fall". Three additional song names revealed as well: "End of Summer", "The Avenue", and "Hallelujah".

On June 25, Scooter Ward announced that John Otto from Limp Bizkit would be playing the drums on the upcoming debut album. The Series of Emotion was recorded in Los Angeles over the summer and fall of 2007 and was slated for a fall 2008 release through the new label I AM: WOLFPACK, of which Ross Robinson is the producer. Robinson was also the producer for Cold's major label debut, Cold.

The song "Symphony for a Mad World" also has two music videos which can be seen on the band's MySpace page: one filmed in the Wolfpack Offices and another created by a MySpace user. Additional rehearsal and practice videos have been posted on the band's official YouTube channel, where it was also announced that Michael Harris from Idiot Pilot would help out on the studio guitars.

The debut single "Hallelujah" was released on their MySpace page on March 24, 2009.

Another single "Starts When You Fall" was released via iTunes and other digital outlets in June 2009.

Scooter announced on "Alternative Addiction" that the debut self-titled album would be released in the second week of July via SonicStar Records, a label he co-developed with executive producer Toby McDonald. He was true to his word as the album was released on July 14, 2009. To date it is the only album released by the outfit, with Ward electing to focus on Cold's reunion.

== Members ==
- Scooter Ward (Cold) – vocals, guitar, piano

=== Touring and session members ===
- Rocky Gray (We Are the Fallen, Machina, Ex-Evanescence, Living Sacrifice) – drums (live)
- John Otto – (Limp Bizkit) – drums (session)
- Michael Harris (Idiot Pilot) – bass (session & live)

== Albums ==
- The Killer and The Star (2009)
