= Glowbug =

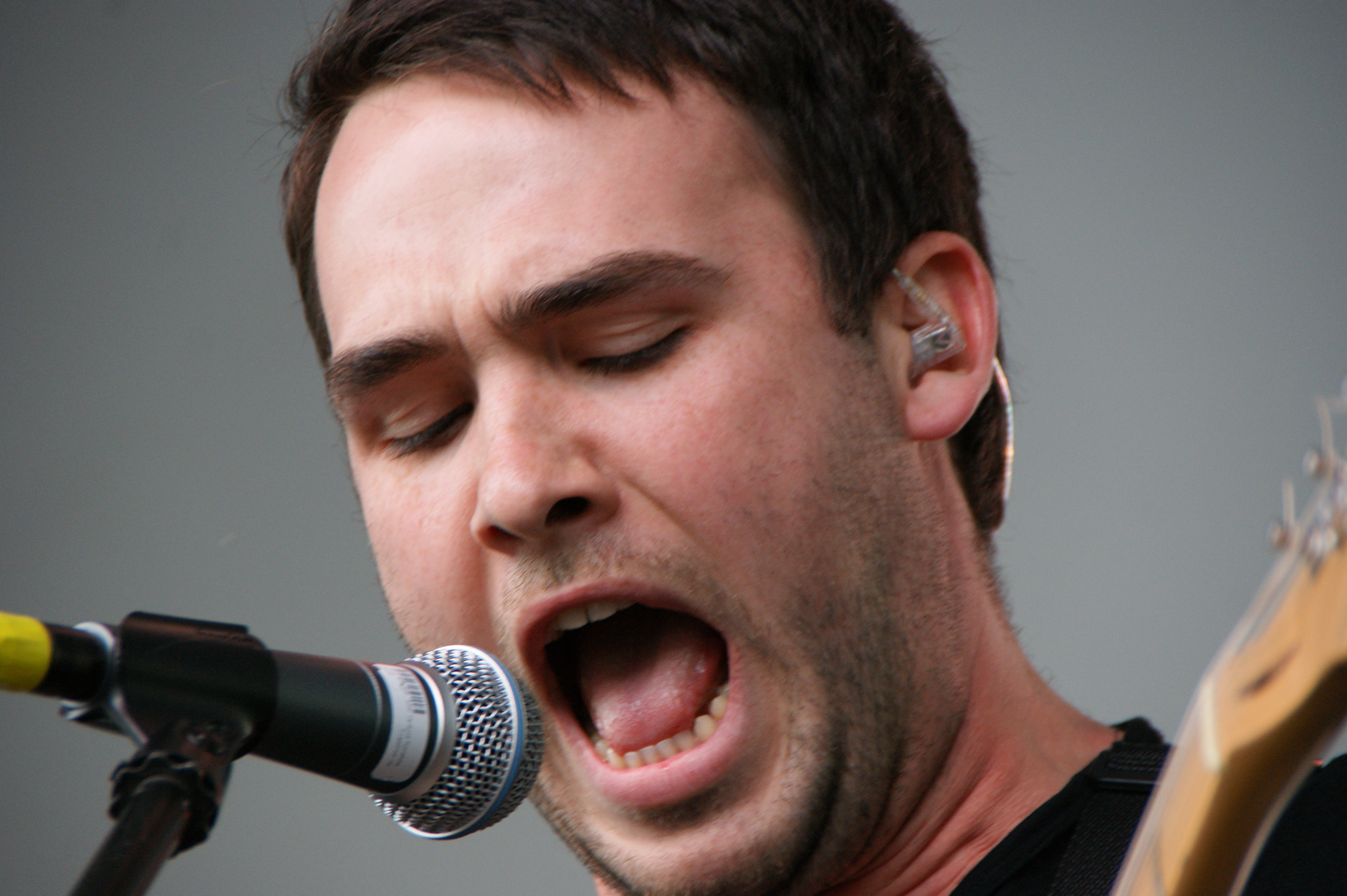
- Daniel Anderson of Glowbug

Background information
- Origin: Bellingham, Washington, United States
- Genres: Electronic, Dance
- Years active: 2010–present
- Labels: Self-released
- Members: Daniel Anderson
- Website: glowbugsounds.com

Glowbug is the dance/electronic band of Los Angeles, CA artist Daniel Anderson, who also fronts The Ghost and the Grace and is one-half of the band Idiot Pilot.

== History ==
The band originated in October 2010 when Daniel Anderson attempted an experiment of writing, recording, mastering and releasing an EP of new material within three days; the final product being the first digital EP Awful Scary, Yes, Very. The following two months (November/December 2010) saw the release of two more EPs: Silian Rail, and Displacer Beast respectively.

A Glowbug song, "Gold And Chains And Guns" from the Silian Rail EP, was used for a Flaunt Magazine photoshoot with Gillian Jacobs (of the NBC show Community).

On May 12, 2011, Glowbug announced via Facebook that the first full-length LP "Mr. Plastic" will be available digitally May 25, 2011. The 12-track album was released free of charge, or for a donation to a charitable organization.

On October 1, 2011 Glowbug released a free, digital-only EP through Bandcamp entitled "Covered In Lights Vol.1" featuring cover songs by The Pixies ("Where Is My Mind), The Smiths (Shoplifters of the World Unite), Radiohead ("Gagging Order"), and Yeah Yeah Yeahs (Maps).

With very little announcement prior, Glowbug released their second LP "Suit of Swords" for free (or by donation) via bandcamp on May 22, 2012.

The album "Headhunters" was released on January 21, 2015. Like past releases, it was made available as a free download via the Glowbug bandcamp website. A vinyl version was also made available as a limited pressing. "Headhunters" features many guest vocals, such as ex-Blood Brothers singer Johnny Whitney. All songs were written, recorded and produced at ABC Studios in Los Angeles, CA.

== Discography ==
=== Albums ===
- Mr. Plastic (2011)
- Suit of Swords (2012)
- Wordless (2014)
- Headhunters (2015)
- Fantasma Del Tropico (2017)
- Weezing (2018)
- Vampire Empire (2020)
- The Bumblebee King (2021)
- Your Funeral (2022)
- VHS (2023)
- Weird (2025)

=== Singles and EPs ===
- Awful Scary, Yes, Very (2010)
- Silian Rail (2010)
- Displacer Beast (2010)
- Covered In Lights Vol. 1 (2011)
- Go Easy (2013)
- Ultimate Stranger (2015)
- Spectorize (2016)
