= Wicked World =

Wicked World may refer to:

- The Wicked World, a play by W. S. Gilbert
- Wicked World (2009 film), a 2009 film by Barry J. Gillis
- Wicked World Records, a UK record company
- "Wicked World" (Black Sabbath song)
- "Wicked World" (Cold song)
- "Wicked World" (Daniel Johnston song), a song by Daniel Johnston from Songs of Pain
- Descendants: Wicked World a 2015 animated TV series
