= Stupid Girl (Cold song) =

Single by Cold

from the album Year of the Spider
- Released: March 18, 2003
- Recorded: September – December 2002
- Studio: Bay 7 Studios (Valley Village, California)
- Genre: Nu metal
- Length: 3:10
- Label: Geffen
- Songwriters: Terry Balsamo; Rivers Cuomo; Stephen D. Hayes; Jeremy Marshall; Sam McCandless; Scooter Ward
- Producers: Cold; Howard Benson

Cold singles chronology
"Gone Away" (2002)	"Stupid Girl" (2003)	"Suffocate" (2003)

"Stupid Girl" is a song by the American rock band Cold and the lead single from their third major label album, Year of the Spider. It was the second song released for the album overall; "Gone Away" was released on the WWF Tough Enough 2 soundtrack while recognized as a Year of the Spider track a year prior to its release. "Stupid Girl" made its radio debut on March 18, 2003, and was the only Cold single to crack the Billboard Hot 100 staying on for 20 weeks and peaking at No. 87. The song, as well as its music video, were heavily played on MTV2 and Fuse TV throughout the several months following its release.

The single was also included on the 2003 heavy metal compilation, MTV2 Headbangers Ball.

== Overview ==
"Stupid Girl" marks a shift in Cold's style into a substantially more commercial direction. Frontman Scooter Ward began working on the song in 2002 and, although he liked the guitar riff, considered it too reminiscent of Weezer, a band that Cold had toured with earlier and befriended. Ward subsequently asked Weezer frontman Rivers Cuomo to lend a hand in the song's development for their first and only collaboration. The verse lyrics and opening/chorus guitar riff were then written by Cuomo. Originally the two singers planned to trade off vocals, but after Cuomo heard Ward's tracks, he decided to limit his own vocal contribution to the pre-chorus. The song blatantly revolves around relationship troubles with bits of tongue-in-cheek phrasing commonly found in Cuomo's writing style.

The song begins with an electric guitar intro followed by an increasingly louder snare beat. This carries into a verse emphasizing vocals of disdain over the subtle guitar and drum beat. The song's bridge halts the established melody for a solo, acoustic chord progression. An anthemic vocal harmony then ensues before returning to the chorus.

An acoustic version of the song was performed on Sessions@AOL which aired on Fuse TV in 2003. The CD single of "Stupid Girl" also includes a remix by Chris Vrenna who hired a Paul Romero as a string arranger and used a complete string section as a basis for the mix.

== Music video ==
The "Stupid Girl" video was directed by Marc Webb, who previously worked with Cold on "Just Got Wicked", on February 22, 2003, in Minneapolis. The band drafted fans for the video to meet at the Bancroft schoolyard in south Minneapolis. "Stupid Girl" has the band performing on a small outdoor stage in the cold February weather. Fans are shown tearing up signs with the names of their apparent former significant others. The song is generally recognized simply as a Cold song and Rivers Cuomo, who contributed to its development, does not appear in the video.

The band initially wanted shots of them performing on a frozen lake filled with fans, but with Geffen worrying about the potential for injury, the band opted for the schoolyard instead.

== Track listing ==
No.	Title	Length
1.	"Stupid Girl"	3:10
2.	"Stupid Girl" (My Life is Long remix)	4:51

== Personnel ==
Cold

- Scooter Ward – vocals
- Kelly Hayes – lead guitar
- Terry Balsamo – rhythm guitar, acoustic guitar
- Jeremy Marshall – bass, backing vocals
- Sam McCandless – drums

== Charts ==
Chart (2003)	Peak position
US Billboard Hot 100	87
US Alternative Airplay (Billboard)	6
US Mainstream Rock (Billboard)	4
