= Sierra Swan =

American singer

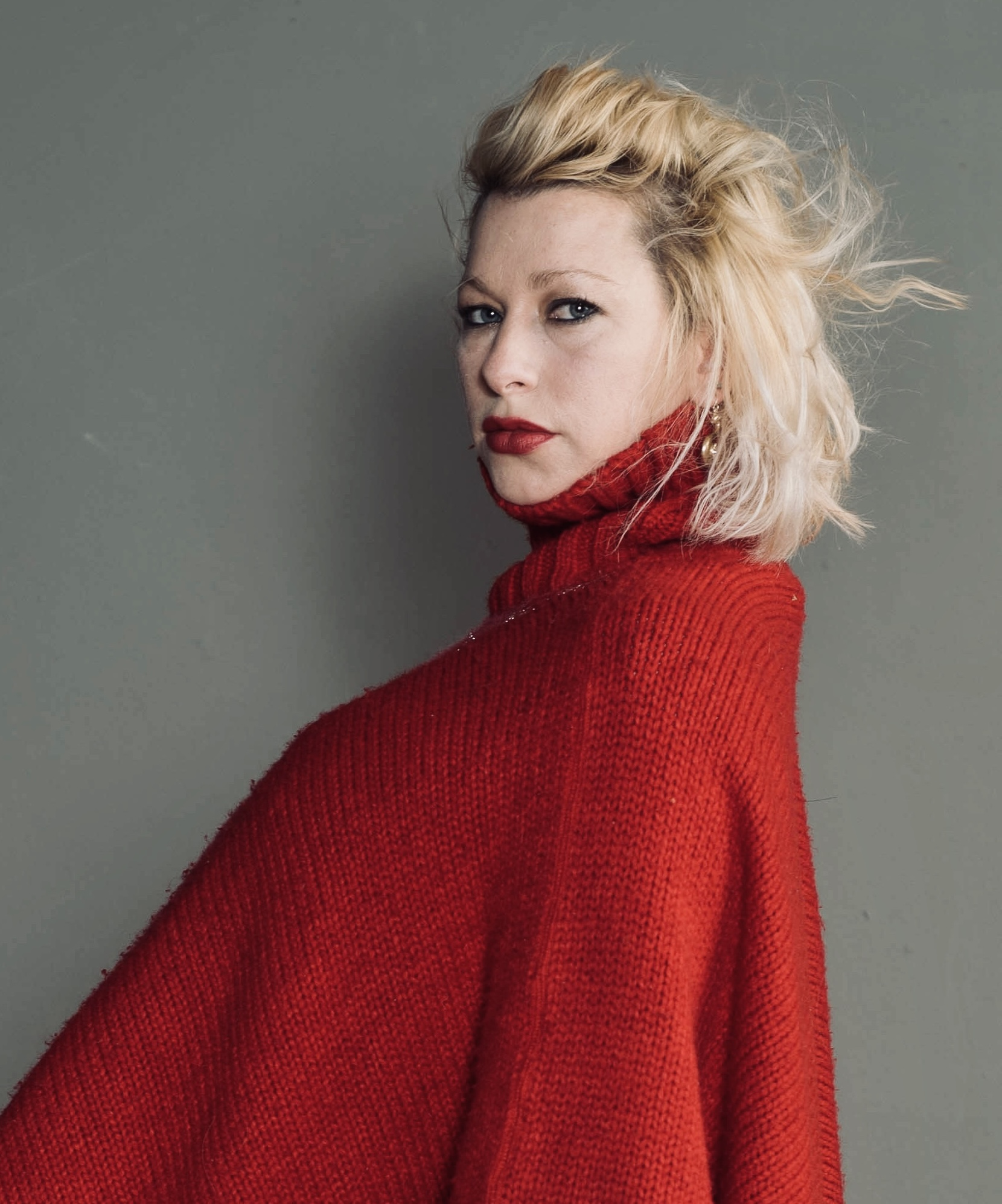
- Picture photographed by Britleigh Cocozzello

Background information
- Born: Sierra Marie Swan; April 5, 1978 (age 48); Los Angeles, California, U.S.
- Genres: Alternative rock; hip hop
- Occupations: Singer, songwriter
- Website: sierraswan.com

Sierra Marie Swan (born April 5, 1978) is an American singer. She is known for her work with Dollshead, Black Eyed Peas and as a solo artist.

== Biography ==
=== Early life ===
Swan is the daughter of 1970s country and pop musician Billy Swan, who played rhythm guitar for Kris Kristofferson.

=== Career ===
When she was sixteen Swan began playing at coffeehouses in Los Angeles. At eighteen she got a residency in Hollywood at Goldfinger's.

In 1997, Swan got together with Graham Edwards and Dollshead was formed. The band was signed and eventually dropped from MCA. After Dollshead, Swan was a member of the Black Eyed Peas during 1998–2000, featuring on the song "Fallin' Up".

After leaving the Black Eyed Peas she went solo. Swan was discovered by Anne Previn and Scott Cutler of Ednaswap. She wrote several songs with Previn and Cutler. In 2001, she was signed to Atlantic Records.

She has released various albums and EPs since 2006. She completed the Queen Of The Valley LP, which was originally titled Queen of the Valley Girls. However, she was dropped from her label which delayed release until 2008. The LP featured such producers as Chad Hugo of the Neptunes and Linda Perry (formerly of the musical group 4 Non Blondes).

Linda Perry worked with Swan on her next (and officially, her first) album, Ladyland in 2006. The album included a duet with singer-songwriter Aimee Mann, titled "Get Down to It" and features additional production work by Bill Bottrell.

Swan released an EP entitled Coward, available on iTunes only, in 2007. She has also released promotional songs online.

Swan has also toured and collaborated with Dave Stewart, Ringo Starr, and Frank Black.

In 2014 she released Good Soldier on February 25 which was produced by Billy Corgan of the Smashing Pumpkins. She sang and played various instruments with the Smashing Pumpkins on their 2016 In Plainsong tour.

In 2018 Swan collaborated once again with Chad Hugo for a five-track EP titled Caterwaul.

== Discography ==
- LadyLand (2006)
- Coward – EP (2007)
- Queen of the Valley (2008)
- Girl Who Cried Wolf (2009)
- The Sun Sessions (2011)
- Good Soldier (2014)
- Tangerines – EP (2020)
- System Breaker – EP (2023)

== Guest vocals ==
Swan is credited as guest vocalist on the following albums:

- Cyr by the Smashing Pumpkins
- Atum: A Rock Opera in Three Acts by the Smashing Pumpkins
- Ogilala by Billy Corgan ("Processional")
- ...Is a Real Boy by Say Anything
- Infinite Motion by T-Tauri
- Two Angels and a Dream by Depswa, on the song "Traveler's Song"
- From There to Here by John Oszajca
- Fast Man Raider Man by Frank Black
- 13 Ways to Bleed on Stage by Cold, on the songs "No One" and "Witch"
- Year of the Spider by Cold, on the song "Suffocate"
- "Fallin Up" by the Black Eyed Peas
