= Matt Loughran =

American guitarist

- Origin: Jacksonville, Florida
- Genres: Alternative metal; post-grunge; nu metal; hard rock; alternative rock
- Occupation: Guitarist
- Years active: 1986–present

Matt Loughran is an American musician who is best known as a founding member and former lead guitarist of the rock band Cold. He is now the lead guitarist for a band in Jacksonville, Florida called Dawn Patrol.

== Career ==
=== Grundig ===
In 1986, Loughran formed the band Grundig, which would later be known as Cold, along with several other students; Scooter Ward, Jeremy Marshall, and Sam McCandless at Fletcher High School in Neptune Beach, Florida. The band played their first gig in 1990 at a club called the Spray. In 1992, Loughran left the band.

=== Cold ===
In September of 2004, Loughran rejoined Grundig, which the band was now renamed Cold, and helped them record their fourth studio album, A Different Kind of Pain, which was released on August 30, 2005. Loughran remained in the band until they disbanded on November 17, 2006.

=== Dawn Patrol ===
Since his departure from Cold, Loughran has been the lead guitarist for the Jacksonville, Florida band, Dawn Patrol.

== Discography ==
Cold

- A Different Kind of Pain (2005)
