= The Ghost and the Grace =

- Origin: Bellingham, Washington, United States
- Genres: Indie folk Indie rock
- Years active: 2009–2010
- Label: None
- Members: Daniel Anderson
- Website: theghostandthegrace.com

The Ghost and The Grace was an American indie folk project for Daniel Anderson. The live band consisted of singer-songwriter Daniel Anderson along with several other rotating musicians from the Bellingham, Washington music scene.

== History ==
The band was conceived by Anderson during a tour with Drop Dead, Gorgeous, during which he was overwhelmed by playing with metal and hardcore bands and decided to create an outlet for other genres of music.

The debut album, Behold! A Pale Horse, was released on July 6, 2009, through the band's website. The choice to release the record without a label was "a kind of experiment" by Anderson so test if an artist could create and distribute an album completely independently .

The Ghost and the Grace released the first installment of holiday music on November 26, 2009, entitled Holiday Spirit Vol. 1 on its website, either free of charge or donations towards the Breast Cancer Research Foundation.

On June 29, 2010, The Ghost and The Grace announced the title of their new record Rat King on their website. Later in the year Anderson eventually dropped all work on the album in favor of his new project Glowbug.

== Discography ==
=== Studio albums ===
- Behold! A Pale Horse (July 6, 2009)

=== Extended plays ===
- Holiday Spirit Vol. 1 (November 26, 2009)

=== Singles ===
- Genetics (June 16, 2009)
- Bullet with Butterfly Wings (October 18, 2009)
- Los Angeles (June 17, 2010)
