= Black Eyes & Neckties =

US musical group

- Genres: Hardcore, Horror punk
- Years active: 2002—2009
- Labels: Clickpop, New Regard Media, Krazy Keith
- Members: Bradley Horror; Ryan Cadaver; Davey Crypt; Brenda Grimm; Josh Homicide; The Fist

Black Eyes & Neckties is an American horror punk/punk rock band from Bellingham, Washington, United States.

== History ==
Often abbreviated as "BENt", Black Eyes & Neckties was formed in 2002 by founding members Ryan Greer (Cadaver), Bradley Lockhart (Horror), Davey Albert (Crypt), Thomas Robinson (Juan) and Ryan Patterson (Dead Sexy).

The bands' debut album, Stiletto, was released in 2004 by New Regard Media. The follow-up, Apparition!, was released in October 2007 on Clickpop Records.

In June 2009 they released a split vinyl 12" with The Russians on Krazy Keith Records. BENt was awarded "Best Rock Band" in Bellingham, WA in 2004, 2005, 2006, 2007 (tied with the Russians), and 2008 by What's Up!. In March 2009 they signed with the William Morris Agency and toured throughout the UK in May 2009.

They have also been featured in the Seattle newspaper The Stranger. BENt broke up in the Fall of 2009 after guitar player Josh Homicide quit the band. They played their final show on October 31, 2009 at The Nightlight Lounge in Bellingham, WA.

Recent projects of former members include Dryland (featuring Brad Lockhart and Ryan Greer), Rookery (featuring David Albert, Brenda Grimm and Ryan Greer), Baltic Cousins (featuring Brad Lockhart), and Dog Shredder/Wild Throne (featuring Josh (Homicide) Holland).

The band performed a reunion show on March 3, 2018 at the Wild Buffalo House of Music in Bellingham, WA for What's Up! Magazine's 20th Anniversary party with The Trucks, The Growers, Keaton Collective, and The Patio Kings.

== Current members ==
The band currently consists of six members:

- Bradley Horror (vocals)
- Ryan Cadaver (guitar)
- Davey Crypt (drums)
- Brenda Grimm (keyboard)
- Josh Homicide (guitar)
- The Fist (bass).

== Discography ==
- Stiletto (2004)
- Apparition! (2007)
- Black Eyes & Neckties/The Russians (Split 12") (2009)
