= Wolves (Idiot Pilot album) =

Album by Idiot Pilot

Studio album by Idiot Pilot
- Released: August 20, 2007
- Genres: Alternative rock, indie rock, post-rock, shoegaze, screamo, post-hardcore
- Length: 43:12
- Label: Reprise
- Producers: Ross Robinson, Mark Hoppus

Idiot Pilot chronology
Strange We Should Meet Here (2005)	Wolves (2007)	Blue Blood (2019)

Wolves is the second full-length release album by Washington duo Idiot Pilot. It was produced by Ross Robinson (At the Drive-In, Glassjaw) and Mark Hoppus (singer and bassist of +44 and Blink 182). The third track, "Retina and the Sky" was also featured on the soundtrack of Michael Bay's film Transformers. The album had a delayed release, first digitally on August 20, 2007 and physically October 2, 2007. Wolves features guest performers Travis Barker on drums in "Elephant" and Chris Pennie on drums in the rest of the tracks. Cover art is by Frank Maddocks Design.

The disc was available at stores starting February 12, 2008.

== Background ==
Based out of Bellingham, WA, since the age of 12 Michael Harris and Daniel Anderson of Idiot Pilot have been producing and composing music. With the release of Strange We Should Meet Here in 2004 with Clickpop Records, then a re-release in 2005 on Reprise, anticipation had built for a new record. With producer Ross Robinson (At the Drive-In, Glassjaw) and Mark Hoppus (singer and bassist of +44 and Blink 182), Idiot Pilot spent four months in the studio recording Wolves.

== Reception and aftermath ==
Professional ratings
Review scores
Source	Rating
AbsolutePunk.net	69%
Allmusic	3/5 stars
Outburn Magazine	9/10

The release of Wolves pushed Idiot Pilot on the mainstream scene. Their second song "Elephant" had Travis Barker on drums which brought a larger fan base from Blink 182. Their third song on the album, "Retina and the Sky", made its way on to the Transformers soundtrack. With the initial success of the album, Idiot Pilot joined the Taste of Chaos tour with Bullet For My Valentine and Avenged Sevenfold in late 2008. Early 2009, Idiot Pilot parted ways with Reprise "due to artistic differences".

== Track listing ==
All tracks are written by Michael Harris and Daniel Anderson.

Wolves
No.	Title	Length
1.	"Last Chance"	4:06
2.	"Elephant"	3:45
3.	"Retina and the Sky"	3:37
4.	"In Record Shape"	4:11
5.	"Good Luck"	4:07
6.	"Cruel World Enterprise"	3:29
7.	"Red Museum"	4:42
8.	"Theme from the Pit"	4:50
9.	"Planted in the Dark"	3:26
10.	"Recurring Dream"	6:59
Total length:		43:12

== Personnel ==
Idiot Pilot

- Michael Harris - Lead vocals, Guitar
- Daniel Anderson - Guitar, programming, bass guitar, keyboards, unclean vocals

Additional Musicians

- Travis Barker - Drums on "Elephant"
- Chris Pennie - Drums

Artwork

- Frank Maddocks - Creative Director, design, photography
- Darren Ankenman - Photography

Production

- Ross Robinson - Producer
- Mark Hoppus - Producer
- Ted Jensen - Mastering
- Craig Aaronson & Rachel Howard - A&Rs
- James Ingram & Paul Turpin - Engineers
- Chip Westerfield - Engineer, vocal producer
- Tim Palmer & Jamie Seyberth Mixing
