= The Trucks =

Studio album by The Trucks
- Released: August 10, 2006
- Genres: Electronic rock, alternative
- Label: Clickpop Records/ spinART Records

Professional ratings
Review scores
Source	Rating
SFStation	link

The Trucks is the debut studio album by the electronic rock band The Trucks. It was released in 2006 on Clickpop Records. The Trucks played Sasquatch! Music Festival in 2006.

== Track listing ==
1. "Introduction" – 3:22
2. "Titties" – 4:22
3. "Zombie" – 3:21
4. "Shattered" – 3:12
5. "Messages" – 3:25
6. "Old Bikes" – 2:55
7. "Man Voice" – 3:09
8. "Comeback" – 3:58
9. "3AM" – 4:03
10. "Big Afros" – 2:17
11. "March 1st" – 2:55
12. "Diddle-Bot" – 3:45
13. "Why The?" – 3:50
