= Daniel Anderson (musician) =

American musician and record producer

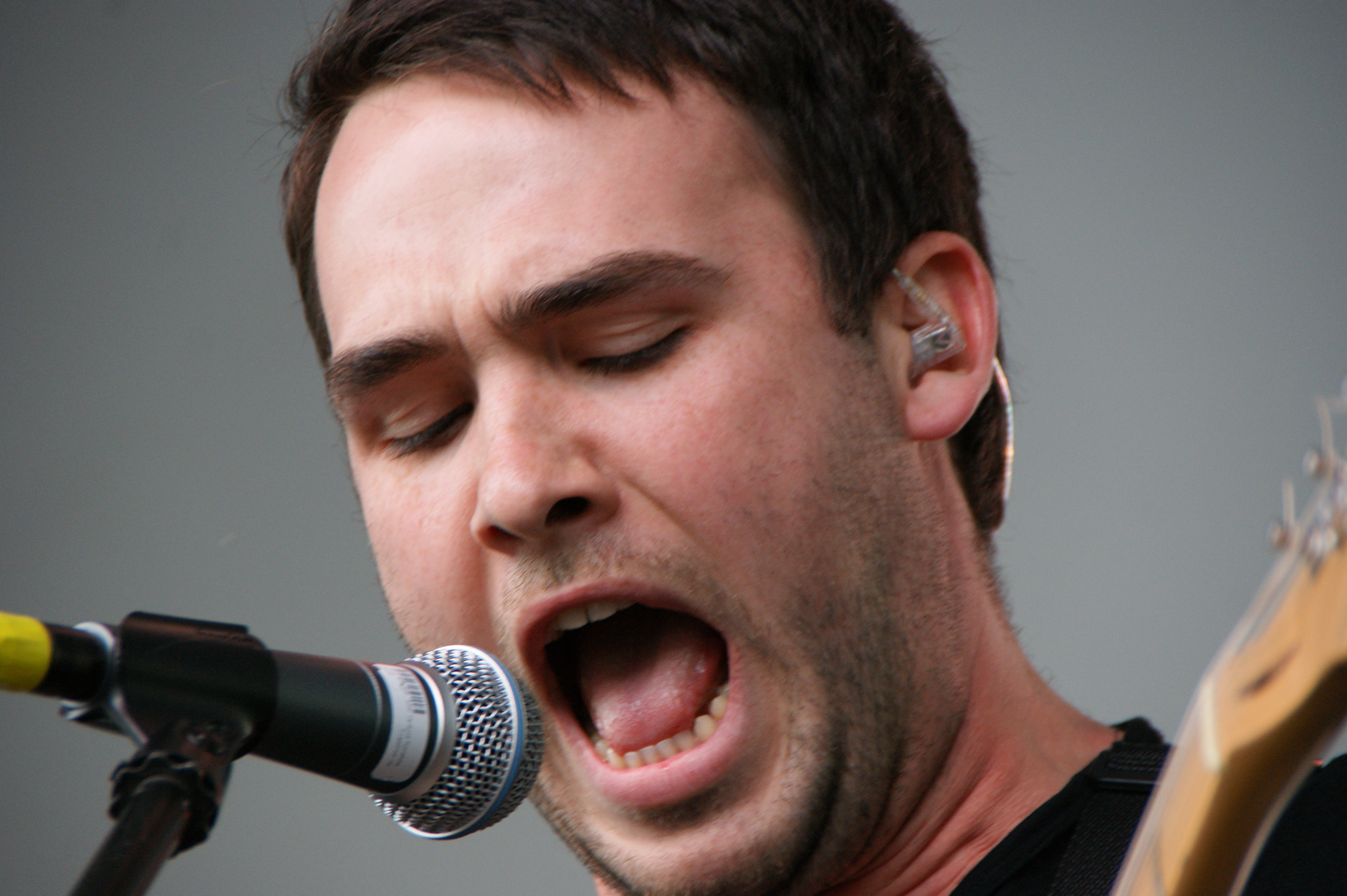
- Anderson in 2010

Background information
- Born: Daniel Robert Anderson; March 3, 1986 (age 40); Bellingham, Washington, U.S.
- Origin: Bellingham, Washington, U.S.
- Genres: Alternative rock Post-hardcore; Experimental; Electronica; Indie rock
- Occupation: Musician
- Instruments: Vocals; Guitar; Keyboards; Programming; Banjo; Accordion; Bass
- Years active: 2005–present
- Member of: Idiot Pilot; The Ghost and the Grace; Glowbug

Daniel Robert Anderson (born March 3, 1986) is an American musician and record producer, and one of the founding members of the alternative rock band Idiot Pilot and dance/electronic band Glowbug. His side projects include Tarantula Tapes and the Ghost and the Grace. He is a multi-instrumentalist and vocalist.

== History ==
In 2010, Anderson officially held the fifth highest score ever recorded on Nintendo's Tetris. He has a brief cameo in the season 8 episode of CSI: New York, "Kill Screen", which is about competitive gaming.

Anderson recorded guitar on rapper Hyro Da Hero's 2011 album, Birth, School, Work, Death.

On October 14, 2010, Anderson released an EP of electronic and dance music under the moniker, Glowbug.

In late 2013, Anderson announced a musical collaboration with Lourdes Hernández of Russian Red, called Spectorize.

== Discography ==
=== With Idiot Pilot ===
Studio albums

- Strange We Should Meet Here (2005)
- Wolves (2007)
- Blue Blood (2019)

=== With The Ghost and the Grace ===
Studio albums

- Behold! A Pale Horse (2009)

=== With Glowbug ===
Studio albums

- Mr. Plastic (2011)
- Suit of Swords (2012)
- Wordless (2014)
- Headhunters (2015)
- Fantasma Del Tropico (2017)
- Weezing (2018)
- Vampire Empire (2020)
- The Bumblebee King (2021)
- Your Funeral (2022)
- VHS (2023)
- Weird (2025)

=== With Ancient Lasers ===
Studio albums

- You In The Future (2013)
- In Quicksand (2015)
- Artifact Wavs (2016)
- No Photos on God Mode (2018)
