= The Jackal (soundtrack) =

Soundtrack album by Various Artists
- Released: 28 October 1997
- Genres: Big beat, electronica, breakbeat, trip hop, alternative rock
- Label: MCA Records

Professional ratings
Review scores
Source	Rating
Uncut	3/5 stars

The Jackal soundtrack features music from and inspired by the 1997 remake of the film of the same name. It was released in 1997 on MCA Records.

== Track listing ==
1. "Going Out of My Head" - Fatboy Slim
2. "Poison" - The Prodigy
3. "Superpredators (Metal Postcard)" - Massive Attack (based on samples of Siouxsie and the Banshees' "Mittageisen")
4. "Star" - Primal Scream
5. "Swallowed" (Goldie/Toasted on Both Sides Mix) - Bush
6. "Joyful Girl" (Peace and Love Mix) - Ani DiFranco
7. "Shining" - Moby
8. "It's Over, It's Under" - Dollshead
9. "Get Higher" - Black Grape
10. "Sunray 2" - Goldie & J Majik
11. "Shineaway" - BT featuring Richard Butler
12. "Red Tape" - Agent Provocateur
13. "Toothache" (Chemical Risk mix) - The Charlatans
14. "Leave You Far Behind" - Lunatic Calm
15. "Raw Power" - Apollo 440
16. "Demon's Theme" - LTJ Bukem
17. "Quédate Aquí" - Mariachi Ameca (Written by José Luis Cervantes)
