= Dollshead =

American rock band

- Origin: Los Angeles, California, U.S.
- Genres: Alternative rock, electronic
- Years active: 1997–1998
- Labels: MCA
- Past members: Sierra Swan, Graham Edwards

Dollshead was an American alternative rock/electronic band. Its members were California-born vocalist Sierra Swan and bassist Graham Edwards from Scotland, who in 1997 began collaborating after an impromptu jam session at a Los Angeles studio. The band released their first and only album Frozen Charlotte in 1998. Critics have likened Dollshead's sound to that of the bands Garbage and Curve.
At present, the two members of the duo work separately on other musical projects: Sierra released a solo album in 2006 and Graham is a member of the music production team The Matrix.

== Releases ==
- "It's Over, It's Under" – single, released December 1997, on record label MCA Records. The song appeared on the soundtrack to the movie The Jackal, as well as in "The Harsh Light of Day", an episode from the fourth season of the television show Buffy the Vampire Slayer. The song was also in the film The 13th Floor.
- Frozen Charlotte – album, released April 1998, on record label MCA Records. Includes 12 tracks.
