= Wicked World (Cold song) =

Single by Cold

from the album Superfiction
- Released: May 10, 2011
- Recorded: Early 2011
- Genre: Post-grunge; alternative metal
- Length: 3:36
- Label: Eleven Seven Music
- Songwriters: Scooter Ward, Kato Khandwala Bobby Huff
- Producer: Cold

Cold singles chronology
| "A Different Kind of Pain" (2006) | "Wicked World" (2011) | "American Dream" (2012) |

"Wicked World" is a song by American post-grunge band Cold and the lead single from their fifth studio album, Superfiction. The song was released to radio stations on May 10, 2011.

== Music video ==
The band released the music video for the song directed by Blake Judd.

== Track listing ==
| No. | Title | Length |
|---|---|---|
| 1. | "Wicked World" | 3:36 |

== Charts ==
| Chart (2011) | Peak position |
|---|---|
| US Mainstream Rock Songs (Billboard) | 21 |
| US Rock Songs (Billboard) | 50 |
