= Superfiction (album) =

Studio album by Cold
- Released: July 19, 2011
- Recorded: 2010
- Studio: Sonicstar Studios (Jacksonville Beach, Florida)
- Genres: Alternative rock; post-grunge; alternative metal
- Length: 45:51
- Labels: SonicStar; Eleven Seven Music
- Producers: Jeremy Parker; Kato Khandwala

Cold chronology
A Different Kind of Pain (2005)	Superfiction (2011)	The Things We Can't Stop (2019)

Singles from Superfiction
- 1. "Wicked World" Released: May 10, 2011; 2. "American Dream" Released: January 1, 2012; 3. "Emily" Released: May 12, 2012; 4. "Delivering the Saint" Released: September 18, 2012; 5. "Flight of the Superstar" Released: December 13, 2012

Professional ratings
Review scores
Source	Rating
AllMusic	3/5 stars
[&].com	8/10 stars

Superfiction is the fifth album by the American rock band Cold. It was released on July 19, 2011 in the US and in the UK. This is Cold's first album since their reunion and six years since their previous release. Two singles were released; "Wicked World" and "American Dream".

== Background ==
While touring the band announced that at every show they would be recording their new song "Snowblind" and that the best performance would be included as a hidden track on the new album, this however turned out to be untrue as the retail versions only contain the original twelve songs proposed for the release. "The Crossroads" was originally titled "My Religion" during Cold's live shows before the album's release. "What Happens Now?" was written for a new Spider-Man movie and was initially titled "The Web". To the band's dismay, it was ultimately not chosen to be featured in the film.

This is Cold's first album to be released on vinyl, the first album the band recorded as a four-piece since their 1998 debut, and their last album with members Jeremy Marshall, Zach Gilbert and Sam McCandless.

== Commercial performance ==
The album debuted at #37 on the Billboard 200, selling 11,000 copies in its first week. It dropped off the chart after two weeks.

== Track listing ==
All lyrics are written by Scooter Ward; all music is composed by Scooter Ward, except where noted; all drum beats created by Sam McCandless

Standard edition
No.	Title	Music	Length
1.	"Wicked World"	Ward; Kato Khandwala; Bobby Huff	3:36
2.	"What Happens Now"		3:42
3.	"American Dream"	Ward; Khandwala	3:38
4.	"The Break"		3:45
5.	"Welcome2MyWorld"		3:30
6.	"Emily"		3:36
7.	"The Crossroads"		4:18
8.	"Delivering the Saint"	Ward; Zac Gilbert; McCandless; Jeremy Marshall	4:24
9.	"So Long June"	Ward; Gilbert; McCandless; Marshall	4:41
10.	"The Park"		3:40
11.	"Flight of the Superstar"		3:30
12.	"The Ballad of the Nameless"		3:29

iTunes exclusive
No.	Title	Writer(s)	Length
13.	"Dream On"	Steven Tyler	3:34

== Personnel ==
Cold

- Scooter Ward – lead vocals, rhythm guitar, piano
- Zach Gilbert – lead guitar
- Jeremy Marshall – bass, backing vocals
- Sam McCandless – drums

Additional personnel

- Jeremy Parker – co-producer
- Kato Khandwala – co-producer, mixing, additional engineering
- Nathan James – mastering
- Christopher Flowers – assistant and additional engineer
- Brian Robbins – assistant engineer
- Michael "Mutoh" Milan – guitar tech, digital editing
- Terrence Deutsch – digital editing
- John Bender – additional background vocals
- Philipa Ruben – voice of news personality (track 9)
- Trevor Niemann – art direction and design

== Charts ==
Charts	Peak position
U.S. Billboard 200	37
U.S. Billboard Rock Albums	10
U.S. Billboard Independent Albums	5
U.S. Billboard Alternative Albums	10
U.S. Billboard Hard Rock Albums	4
