= Scooter Ward =

American singer

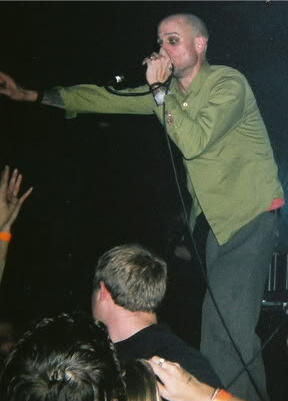
- Ward in 2005

Background information
- Also known as: KeviWard
- Born: Ronald Ward Jr. May 7, 1970 (age 55); Jacksonville, Florida, U.S.
- Genres: Alternative metal; post-grunge; nu metal; hard rock; alternative rock
- Occupations: Singer; musician; songwriter
- Instruments: Vocals; guitar; keyboards
- Years active: 1986–present
- Member of: Cold; The Killer and the Star
- Formerly of: Grundig

Ronald "Scooter" Ward Jr. (born May 7, 1970), sometimes credited as KeviWard, is an American singer, musician, and songwriter. He is best known as the lead singer, occasional guitarist, and only constant member of the rock band Cold, which he co-founded in 1986. In 2006, he was ranked at No. 61 on the "Top 100 Heavy Metal Vocalists" list by Hit Parader.

== Career ==
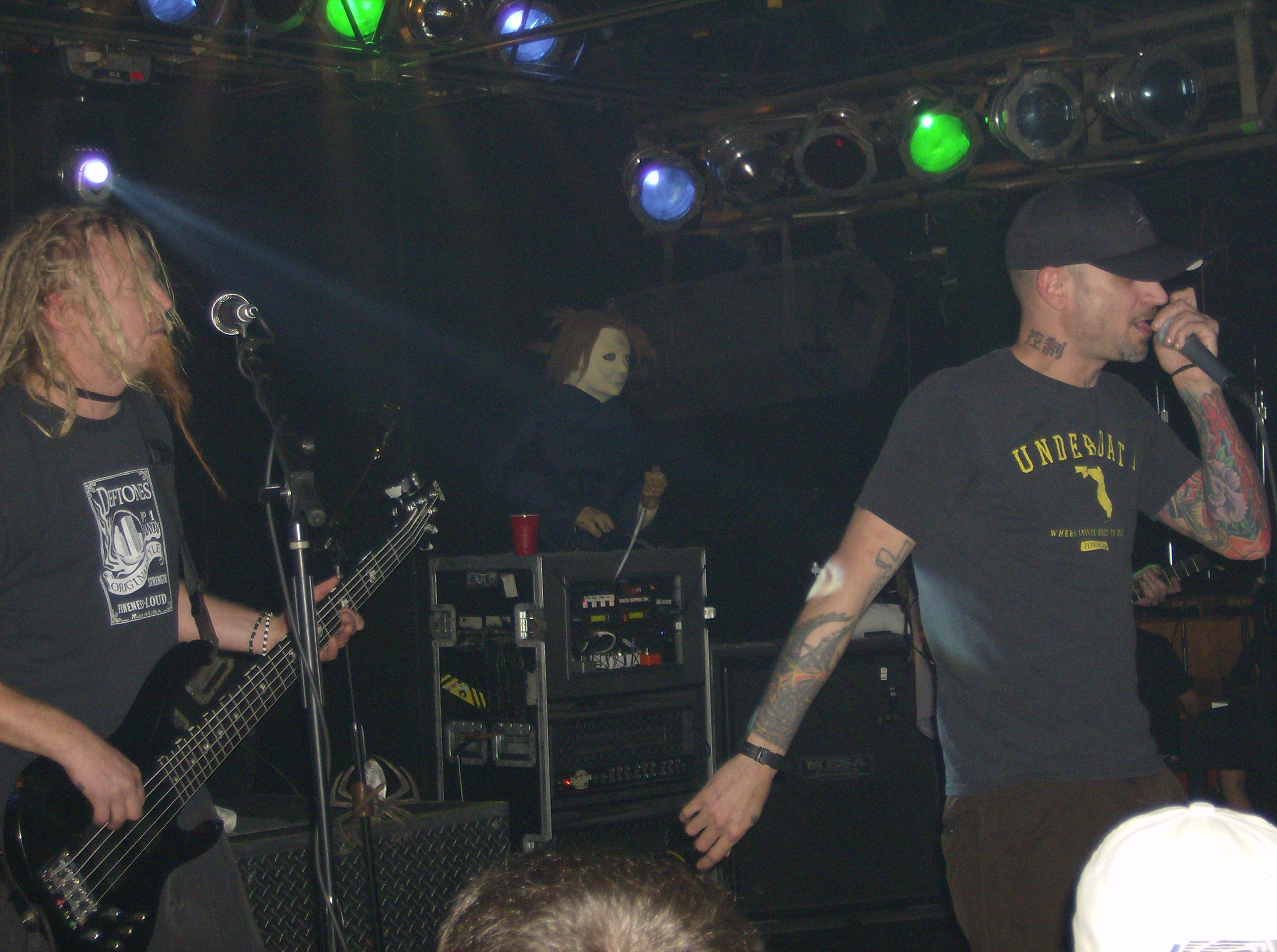
Ward (right) with Cold in 2009

In 1986, Ward formed the band Grundig along with several other students, Sam McCandless, Jeremy Marshall, and Matt Loughran, at Fletcher High School in Neptune Beach, Florida. The band played their first gig in 1990 at a club called the Spray. In 1992, the band released an eight-song EP called "Into Everything" and moved to Atlanta, Georgia. Three and a half years later in 1995, Grundig broke up and Ward moved back to Jacksonville, where he, McCandless, Kelly Hayes, and Pat Lally formed the band Diablo. Diablo would only last about three months.

At the end of that three-month period, Grundig reformed under the name Cold and signed a six-album record deal with A&M Records. Ward would remain in Cold until February 2006 when, after several lineup changes and battles with record labels, the band decided to break up. Scooter Ward and McCandless promptly began working on their new project, The Witch, which McCandless has since left. The project has been renamed twice, When November Falls and now The Killer and the Star. The debut album was released in July 2009. In early 2009, Cold reformed for a reunion tour. Their album Superfiction was released on July 19, 2011. Their latest album, The Things We Can't Stop, was released on September 13, 2019, after Cold went through some lineup changes.

== Personal life ==
Ward is married and has two daughters. He was previously engaged, but his fiancée ended the engagement in 2004 just as he was dealing with his sister's cancer diagnosis, during which time he also checked himself into rehab for drug and alcohol issues. While in rehab, he became a Christian after finding relief through spirituality and recalling his time growing up in a Southern Baptist household.

Ward has been an avid Spider-Man and Marvel fan since childhood and has collected much Spider-Man merchandise. He wrote the song "What Happens Now" with the hopes that it would be featured in The Amazing Spider-Man (2012), and the track later appeared on Cold's album Superfiction with artwork of a Spider-Man-esque character in the album's booklet.

== Instruments ==
Ward played both guitar and piano in Grundig and on Cold's debut album, but stopped playing guitar when the band recruited Terry Balsamo; he picked it up again during the recording of Superfiction nearly a decade later. He usually uses Gibson SG guitars with DR DDT strings and Vox amplification.

== Discography ==
Album information
Cold
- Released: June 2, 1998 (US)
- Label: A&M Records
- Chart Positions: –
- RIAA Certification: –
- Singles: "Go Away", "Give"
Oddity EP
- Released: 1998 (US)
- Label: Flip Records
- Chart Positions: –
- RIAA Certification: –
- Singles: –
13 Ways to Bleed on Stage
- Released: September 12, 2000 (US)
- Label: Geffen Records
- Chart Positions: #98 (US), #1 (Heatseekers)
- RIAA Certification: Gold
- Singles: "Just Got Wicked", "Confession", "End of the World", "No One", "Bleed"
Year of the Spider
- Released: May 13, 2003 (US)
- Label: Geffen Records
- Chart Positions: #3 (US)
- RIAA Certification: Gold
- Singles: "Gone Away", "Stupid Girl", "Suffocate", "Wasted Years"
A Different Kind of Pain
- Released: August 30, 2005 (US)
- Label: Lava Records
- Chart Positions: #26 (US)
- RIAA Certification: –
- Singles: "Happens All the Time", "A Different Kind of Pain"
Superfiction
- Released: July 19, 2011 (US)
- Label: SonicStar
- Chart Positions: #37 (US)
- RIAA Certification: –
- Single: "Wicked World", "American Dream", "Emily", "Delivering the Saint", "Flight of the Superstar"
The Things We Can't Stop
- Released: September 13, 2019 (US)
- Label: Napalm
- RIAA Certification: -
- Singles: "Shine", "Without You", "The Devil We Know", "Run", "We All Love", "Quiet Now"

== Guest vocals ==
In addition to his releases with Cold and Grundig, Ward has also been a guest vocalist on the songs:

- Tony Iommi – "Something Wicked This Way Comes"
- Reveille – "Inside Out (Can You Feel Me Now)"
- Superfly Rodeo – "Reach"
- Sierra Swan – "You Got Away"
- Professor Hoetester – "The Saddest Song"
- He-Nis-Ra – "Derailed" (2015)
- Breaking Benjamin – "Far Away"
- deer death - “Letter To My Inner Child” (2023)
