= Strange We Should Meet Here =

Studio album by Idiot Pilot
- Released: March 8, 2004; May 17, 2005 (Re-release)
- Genre: Alternative rock, electronic rock, post-hardcore, ambient, art rock, experimental rock
- Length: 57:29
- Label: Reprise/Clickpop Records
- Producer: Idiot Pilot, Paul Turpin, Chip Westerfield, Dave Richards

Idiot Pilot chronology
Strange We Should Meet Here (2004)	Wolves (2007)

Professional ratings
Review scores
Source	Rating
Allmusic	2.5/5 stars
Drowned in Sound	6/10 stars
MusicOMH	5/5 stars
Pitchfork	3.5/10

Strange We Should Meet Here is an album released by electronic rock duo, Idiot Pilot, on May 17, 2005.

== Track listing ==
All tracks are written by Michael Harris and Daniel Anderson.

No.	Title	Length
1.	"Losing Color"	3:55
2.	"A Day in the Life of a Poolshark"	4:26
3.	"Open Register"	4:47
4.	"Les Lumieres"	4:19
5.	"The Violent Tango"	3:40
6.	"Nightlife"	4:08
7.	"Spark Plug"	3:43
8.	"Moerae (The Locust)"	3:57
9.	"Strange We Should Meet Here"	4:41
10.	"Militance Prom"	2:53
11.	"To Buy a Gun"	4:20
12.	"A Light at the End of the Tunnel"	3:15
13.	"Arrhythmia"	4:36
14.	"Lucid"	4:45

== Personnel ==
- Michael Harris – vocals, producer
- Daniel Anderson – vocals, guitar, programmer, bass guitar, keyboard, piano, producer, engineering
- Joseph Lipham – drums
- Paul Turpin – additional bass guitar, additional Moog, producer, mixing, engineer
- Chip Westerfield – producer, engineer
- Dave Richards – producer
