= The Things We Can't Stop =

Studio album by Cold
- Released: September 13, 2019
- Recorded: 2017–2019
- Genres: Alternative rock; post-grunge
- Length: 45:50
- Label: Napalm
- Producers: Scooter Ward; Nick Coyle; Jeremy Parker

Cold chronology
Superfiction (2011)	The Things We Can't Stop (2019)

Singles from The Things We Can't Stop
- 1. "Shine" Released: June 27, 2019; 2. "Without You" Released: July 19, 2019; 3. "The Devil We Know" Released: August 22, 2019; 4. "Run" Released: September 12, 2019; 5. "We All Love" Released: December 31, 2019; 6. "Quiet Now" Released: April 2, 2020

Professional ratings
Review scores
Source	Rating
AllMusic	3/5 stars
Cryptic Rock	4/5 stars

The Things We Can't Stop is the sixth album by the American rock band Cold. It was released on September 13, 2019, in the US through Napalm Records. The album was produced by Jeremy Parker, who produced the previous album. This is Cold's first album since 2011's Superfiction. This is Cold's only album to include guitarist Nick Coyle, the first to feature bassist Lindsay Manfredi, and their first album not to feature bassist Jeremy Marshall and drummer Sam McCandless. Aaron Fulton was credited as the drummer.

The first single "Shine" was released on June 27, 2019, along with an accompanying lyric video on the same date.

== Release and promotion ==
The album was released on September 13, 2019, on CD, vinyl and digital platforms. To promote the album, the band began the Broken Human tour in selected areas in the United States in fall 2019.

The music video for "Without You" was released on September 18, 2019

== Critical reception ==
James Christopher Monger of AllMusic called the album "commercial-grade active rock angst made with great care and sincerity" that "resonates, but on a mostly superficial/ripped-from-the-headlines level".

=== Accolades ===
Publication	Country	Accolade	Year	Rank
Loudwire	United States	50 Best Rock Albums of 2019	2019	Placed

== Track listing ==
All lyrics and music written by Scooter Ward, except where noted.

No.	Title	Lyrics	Music	Length
1.	"Intro"			0:51
2.	"Shine"			4:40
3.	"Snowblind"			5:11
4.	"The Devil We Know"		Ward; Nick Coyle	2:58
5.	"Run" (Snow Patrol cover)	Gary Lightbody	Lightbody; Jonathan Quinn; Mark McClelland; Nathan Connolly; Iain Archer	4:21
6.	"Better Human"		Ward; Lindsay Manfredi	4:21
7.	"Without You"			3:16
8.	"Quiet Now"			4:14
9.	"The One That Got Away"		Zac Gilbert	3:13
10.	"Systems Fail"			4:24
11.	"Beautiful Life"			4:43
12.	"We All Love"	Coyle; Ward	Coyle	3:36
Total length:				45:50

== Personnel ==
Credits adapted from album liner notes, Discogs and Allmusic.

Cold

- Scooter Ward – lead vocals, rhythm guitar, keyboards, piano
- Nick Coyle – lead guitar, keyboards, strings, programming, backing vocals (tracks 1–11), lead vocals (track 12)
- Lindsay Manfredi – bass

Additional musicians

- Aaron Fulton – drums (tracks 2–4, 6–9, 11)
- Josh Karis – drums (track 5)
- Ethan York – drums (track 10)
- Jonny Nova – rhythm guitar (tracks 5, 10)
- Charlotte B. Freeman – vocals (track 6)
- Jane Jensen – backing vocals (track 11)
- Brian Thompson – piano (track 11)

Technical and artistic personnel

- Scooter Ward – production, mixing
- Nick Coyle – production, mixing
- Jeremy Parker – production, engineer
- Andy VanDette – mastering
- Tom York – executive production
- Dave Jackson – cover art, photo editing
- Britney Lee Betterman – cover art, cover photo
- Joe Torres – cover layout, design

== Charts ==
Chart (2019)	Peak position
US Digital Albums (Billboard)	20
US Independent Albums (Billboard)	11
US Top Album Sales (Billboard)	34
US Top Alternative Albums (Billboard)	11
US Top Hard Rock Albums (Billboard)	7
US Top Rock Albums (Billboard)	15
UK Official Independent Album Breakers (Official Charts)	19
