= Two Angels and a Dream =

Studio album by Depswa
- Released: June 3, 2003
- Studio: Bay 7, Valley Village, California; Sparky Dark Studios, Calabasas, California
- Genre: Alternative metal; post-grunge; nu metal
- Length: 45:29
- Label: Geffen
- Producer: Howard Benson

Depswa chronology
Two Angels and a Dream (2003)	Distorted American Dream (2010)

Two Angels and a Dream is the debut album by American rock band Depswa. It was released on June 3, 2003, via Geffen Records. Album sales were impressive despite the lack of promotion, with over 39,000 copies to date sold in the United States.

The band decided to remove themselves from the Ozzfest 2003 tour when Geffen cut off communication; the band was eventually released from their contract.

An official music video was released for "This Time", which was also featured in the video game NASCAR Thunder 2004. "From the Inside" was featured in the games MLB 2005 and MX Unleashed. "Two Angels and a Dream" was featured in NHL Rivals 2004.

== Reception ==
Professional ratings
Review scores
Source	Rating
AllMusic	3/5 stars
Sputnikmusic	1.5/5

MetalSucks called the album "a collection of excellent alt-metal tinged hard rock songs, a much underappreciated gem that resulted in the band being dropped from Geffen after failing to live up to commercial expectations."

== Track listing ==
1. "This Time" – 2:57
2. "Not Responsible" – 3:06
3. "Needles" – 3:13
4. "Let It Go" – 2:48
5. "Prom Song" – 4:48
6. "Two Angels and a Dream" – 3:02
7. "From the Inside" – 3:12
8. "Voyeur" – 3:53
9. "Charades" – 3;58
10. "Silhouette" – 3:55
11. "The Path" – 3:12
12. "Where I've Begun" – 3:44
13. "Traveler's Song" – 3:25
