= Depswa =

American metal band

- Also known as: Carcinogen (1997–1999)
- Origin: Modesto, California, U.S.
- Genres: Alternative metal; nu metal
- Years active: 1997–2011 (hiatus)
- Label: Geffen
- Members: Jeremy Penick; Dan Noonan; Ryan Burchfeild; Steve White

Depswa is an American alternative metal band from Modesto, California. The band released two studio albums, two EPs, and a compilation before entering an indefinite hiatus in 2011.

== History ==
=== Formation and EP releases ===
The beginnings of Depswa came together in 1997 with vocalist Jeremy Penick and bassist Ryan Burchfield, under their original band name "Carcinogen". With this name, the band released their first EP, named Depswa, that eventually will become the band's name. In 1999, Penick and Burchfield had moved to Los Angeles and added guitarist Dan Noonan. The band would then rename themselves as "Depswa".

The band released their debut EP in 2000 titled Faithless, and by October 2001, had added drummer Gordon Heckaman into the fold.

Depswa had generated some significant interest around a number of major record labels. Ultimately they decided to sign with Geffen Records.

The band went to work recording their debut album with producer Howard Benson. A second guitarist in James Mills also joined the band at this point.

=== Two Angels and a Dream (2003–2004) ===
Depswa released their debut album titled Two Angels and a Dream on June 3, 2003. The band was part of Ozzfest 2003, as a second stage act. Their song, "This Time", was featured in EA Sports' NASCAR Thunder 2004 in two forms, the original with lyrics, and an instrumental version. "This Time" was also sampled by Krayzie Bone on the track "Don't Know Why" from the album Gemini: Good vs. Evil. "From The Inside", was featured in the soundtrack of MX Unleashed.

As of August 13, 2003, Depswa had sold 9,060 copies of their debut album in the United States (according to Nielsen SoundScan). At this point, it was rumored that the band had been dropped off the remaining part of the Ozzfest tour, due to Geffen withdrawing their tour support of the band. Geffen was not in communications with the band's management and had not sent the remainder of the tour support that was needed. The band told Geffen that if they did not receive the backend support they would pull themselves off the tour. Geffen responded saying that they were going to send the funds two days after the band started for home. Upon returning to L.A. Depswa's attorney requested that the label let the band go to pursue other labels that might be more supportive.

On December 6, 2003, guitarist James Mills departed Depswa. The band was seeking a replacement guitarist, but nobody was ever hired, and have since continued as a four-piece with Penick playing second guitar and singing.

=== Inactivity, second studio album, re-releases, and indefinite hiatus (2005–2011) ===
In January 2005, Depswa revealed via their MySpace blog that they were under way recording material for their second album. After working with a couple different producers, Depswa eventually decided to re-record much of the material along with several new songs. In May 2007, they entered the final stages of the recording and mixing process.

May 13, 2007, was Gordon's last show with Depswa as their drummer, being replaced by Steve White. As of April 2008, they've been working hard on mixing the tracks for their next album and hope to be wrapped up by the end of summer 2008.

On March 16, 2010, Depswa released their second studio album Distorted American Dream.

In 2011, Depswa announced they will be going on an indefinite hiatus.

On February 17, 2015, the band released a compilation album of unreleased recordings entitled "Lucid Dreams – Demos, B-Sides, Covers and Rarities", along with a re-release of the Faithless EP and the Depswa EP (originally released, as Carcinogen). The band stated that this will be their last release as of now due to them being on an indefinite hiatus since 2011.

== Band members ==
Current

- Jeremy Penick – vocals, guitar
- Dan Noonan – guitar
- Ryan Burchfeild – bass
- Steve White – drums, vocals

Former

- Gordon Heckaman – drums
- James Mills – guitar
- Jesse Nunn – lead guitar

== Discography ==
Studio albums

- Two Angels and a Dream (2003)
- Distorted American Dream (2010)

EPs

- Depswa (1998) as "Carcinogen"
- Faithless (2000)

Compilations

- Lucid Dreams – Demos, B-Sides, Covers and Rarities (2015)

Music Videos

- "This Time" (2003)
