= Terry Balsamo =

American guitarist (born 1972)

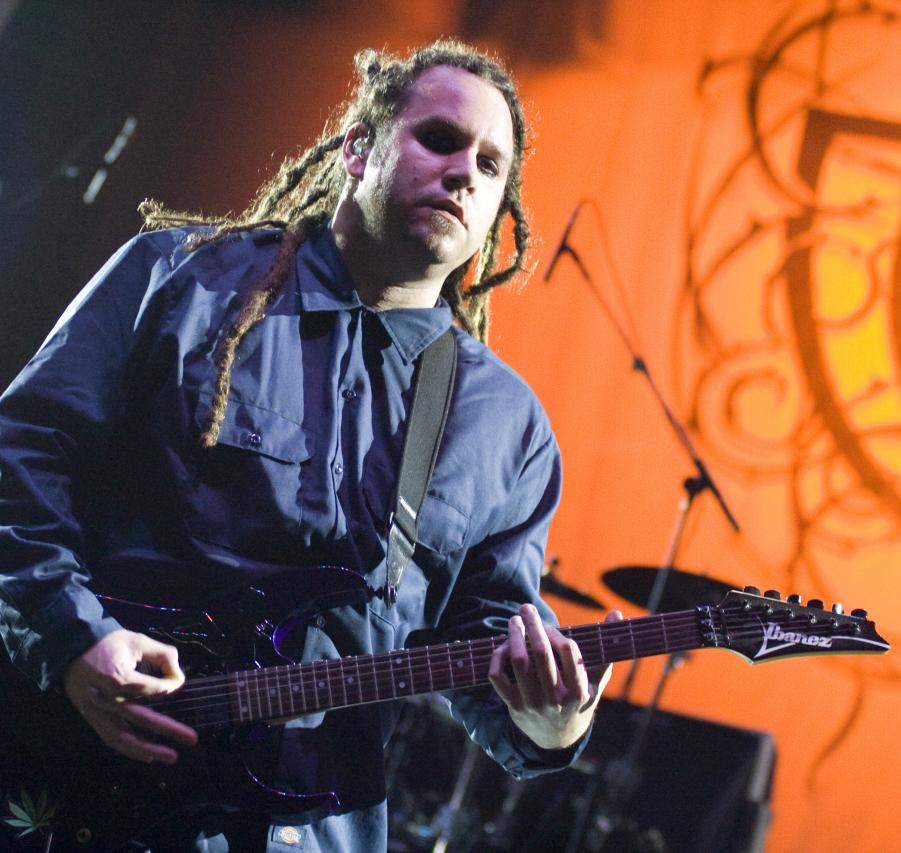
- Balsamo performing with Evanescence in 2009

Background information
- Born: October 8, 1972 (age 53); Tampa, Florida, U.S.
- Genres: Alternative metal; nu metal; hard rock
- Occupation: Musician
- Instrument: Guitar
- Years active: 1994–present
- Formerly of: Evanescence; Cold; Limp Bizkit

Terry Philip Balsamo II (born October 8, 1972) is an American musician who is best known as a former guitarist of the rock bands Cold and Evanescence.

== Biography ==
=== Early projects and Cold ===
After a brief run with the early lineup of Limp Bizkit in 1995, Balsamo joined fellow Jacksonville rockers Scooter Ward, Sam McCandless, Jeremy Marshall and Kelly Hayes of the band Cold in 1999.

Balsamo wrote and recorded with Cold for their albums 13 Ways to Bleed on Stage (2000) and Year of the Spider (2003). He also appeared alongside Staind in Staind's 2001 MTV Unplugged performance. Near the end of his stint with Cold, the band joined Evanescence as an opening act on the 2003 Nintendo Fusion Tour.

Balsamo briefly re-joined Cold for their early 2009 reunion tour. According to a post on Cold's Facebook page on July 8, 2016, Balsamo was returning to the band for the recording of new music. However, he had departed the group again by January 2018, when Cold announced a new album with a new lineup.

=== Evanescence ===
When Evanescence guitarist Ben Moody left the band during the European tour of their debut album Fallen (2003), Balsamo replaced him as lead guitarist on tour and soon joined as Evanescence's permanent guitarist. Balsamo featured on Evanescence's 2004 live album and concert DVD Anywhere but Home, and became singer and pianist Amy Lee's musical collaborator on their second album, The Open Door (2006). Balsamo continued with the band, playing and co-writing on their 2011 self-titled third album. In August 2015, it was announced on the band's Facebook page that Balsamo had parted ways with the band. He performed with the band again in 2019 for the song "Sweet Sacrifice".

== Health issues ==
In October 2005, two days after having finished recording all of his guitar tracks for Evanescence's album The Open Door, Balsamo suffered a stroke from a torn neck artery, leaving the left side of his body paralyzed. The doctors showed him that it was caused by a blood clot in his neck, possibly a result of headbanging on-stage and likely formation of an aneurysm, allowing for pooling of static blood and a thrombus. His doctors did not think he would ever be able to play guitar again. However, Balsamo was determined to overcome the paralysis, and began physical therapy and the process of re-training his hand to play.

== Equipment ==
I use Ibanez guitars. In the studio, I kind of use a similar setup to what I used on the last Cold record I did, which is mix up the amps and combine the sound together. It's a Diezel and a Mesa/Boogie Triple Rectifier and mixed that for one side. Then I took a Bogner and a Mesa/Boogie Triple Rectifier on the other side. I combined it and made one big wall of metal! Right now on tour I'm using T.C. Electronics, the G-System.

— Terry Balsamo, Ultimate-Guitar.com

== Band projects ==
- Evanescence – guitar (2003–2015; 2019 tour performance)
- Cold – guitar (1999–2004, 2009 tour only, 2016–2018)
- Shaft – guitar (1996–1999)
- Limp Bizkit – guitar (1996)

== Discography ==
=== Cold ===
- 13 Ways to Bleed on Stage (2000)
- Year of the Spider (2003)

=== Evanescence ===
- The Open Door (2006)
- Evanescence (2011)
