= WWF Tough Enough 2 =

- Despite the inclusion of the “WWE” logo on the album artwork, this was released under the “WWF” name as it had already been cataloged by Geffen.

Compilation album by Various artists
- Released: May 14, 2002
- Genres: Alternative metal; nu metal; hard rock; post-grunge
- Label: Geffen
- Producers: Jordan Schur (ex.); Steve Berman (ex.); Howard Benson; Fred Durst; DJ Lethal; Josh Abraham; Don Gilmore; Ric Ocasek; Josh Homme; Eric Valentine; Miguel; Unwritten Law; Scott Weiland; Jonathan Davis; Marz; Bob Marlette; Butch Walker; Scott Humphrey; Rob Zombie

Professional ratings
Review scores
| Source | Rating |
|---|---|
| AllMusic | 2/5 stars |

WWF Tough Enough 2 is a compilation album of music related to MTV's reality series of the same name. Cold's "Gone Away" served as the album's single with a popular music video released in mid-April 2002. According to a label spokesperson mere weeks before the album's release, WWF Tough Enough 2 was originally to include a track by Godsmack.

Despite the inclusion of the “WWE” logo on the album cover, the spine on the CD case labels this as a "WWF" release. This is because a week prior to the album's release, WWE had changed its name from "WWF" following a trademark dispute with the World Wide Fund for Nature (WWF). The album had already been cataloged as a "WWF" release by Geffen. The album remains listed as a legacy "WWF" release on digital music services.

== "Gone Away" ==
The album's single, a moody ballad, was originally written for Cold vocalist Scooter Ward's daughter Raven. It focuses on missing family while being on the road and traveling to performances, a necessary evil in both music and professional wrestling. Regarding the song's addition to the Tough Enough 2 album, Ward said:

"Leaving home all the time, never being here because we were on the road — I thought that [wrestlers] must feel the same way because they travel a lot. They leave their family and all that, so I figured I'd just send [what I was working on] to them, thinking they'd never pick it up, but they did."

The song's music video was credited as from Cold's then-forthcoming album Year of the Spider, which wouldn't be released until a year later. Two videos were made, the original having been shot in March 2002 in the group's hometown of Jacksonville, Florida, by director Paul Boyd. In it, the daughter is seen on one of three giant projection screens as Cold perform in a plush, empty theater while fans are projected on the other screens. The audience, some of which traveled from Chicago to be cast into the video, was also treated to a few other Cold songs at the small venue.

== Track listing ==
| No. | Title | Writer(s) | Producer(s) | Length |
|---|---|---|---|---|
| 1. | "Gone Away" (Cold) | Ronald Ward | Howard Benson | 3:14 |
| 2. | "Crushed" (Limp Bizkit) | Fred Durst; DJ Lethal | Fred Durst; DJ Lethal | 3:23 |
| 3. | "Take It" (Staind) | Staind | Josh Abraham | 3:34 |
| 4. | "Falling Apart" (Trust Company) | Trust Company; Don Gilmore | Don Gilmore | 3:30 |
| 5. | "Control" (acoustic version) (Puddle of Mudd) | Wesley Scantlin; Brad Stewart | | 4:09 |
| 6. | "Oh Lisa" (Weezer) | Rivers Cuomo | Ric Ocasek | 2:45 |
| 7. | "Millionaire" (Queens of the Stone Age) | Josh Homme; Mario Lalli | Josh Homme; Eric Valentine | 2:38 |
| 8. | "Seein' Red" (Unwritten Law) | Scott Russo | Miguel; Unwritten Law | 3:47 |
| 9. | "The Bad Touch" (Bully Remix) (Bloodhound Gang) | Jimmy Pop | | 3:47 |
| 10. | "Break Your Silence" (Cinder) | Cinder | Scott Weiland | 4:39 |
| 11. | "Out the Cage" (Marz) | Marz | Jonathan Davis; Marz | 3:22 |
| 12. | "Freak of Nature" (Sinisstar) | Edgy (lyrics); Sinisstar (music); Bob Marlette (music) | Bob Marlette | 4:14 |
| 13. | "Faithless" (Injected) | Injected | Butch Walker | 3:20 |
| 14. | "Feel So Numb" (Rob Zombie) | Rob Zombie | Scott Humphrey; Rob Zombie | 3:53 |

== See also ==
- Music in professional wrestling
