= 13 Ways to Bleed on Stage =

Studio album by Cold
- Released: September 12, 2000
- Recorded: February–June 2000
- Studios: Amethyst Digital, Los Angeles, California; Studio X, Seattle, Washington
- Genres: Nu metal; post-grunge; alternative metal; heavy rock
- Length: 48:31
- Labels: Flip; Geffen
- Producers: Adam Kasper; Chris Vrenna; Fred Durst

Cold chronology
Cold (1998)	13 Ways to Bleed on Stage (2000)	Year of the Spider (2003)

Singles from 13 Ways to Bleed on Stage
- 1. "Just Got Wicked"/"Confession" Released: 2000; 2. "No One" Released: 2000; 3. "End of the World" Released: 2001; 4. "Bleed" Released: 2001

Professional ratings
Review scores
Source	Rating
AllMusic	4/5 stars
Blabbermouth.net	8/10
The Encyclopedia of Popular Music	3/5 stars
Kerrang!	4/5 stars
PopMatters	mixed
Rock Sound	4/5 stars

13 Ways to Bleed on Stage is the second studio album by the American rock band Cold, released on September 12, 2000. With four popular singles, it gained substantial commercial success, achieving gold status, and landed Cold in the mainstream rock scene.

== Background and recording ==
About a year prior to recording 13 Ways, the band enlisted guitarist Terry Balsamo; frontman Scooter Ward, who had sung and played guitar, wanted to focus solely on singing. After trying a few musicians from Los Angeles, Cold chose fellow Jacksonville native Balsamo, who'd played with its members since the age of 18.

The main song structures for 13 Ways were written prior to entering the studio. Using C tuning (the main tuning used in Cold's catalog), the band then experimented with various sounds and dynamics in the studio. Balsamo primarily used an Ibanez RG570 and Mesa Boogie Triple Rectifier.

It is often considered as Cold's darkest record. The album has a Parental advisory on the cover art for strong language and dark graphic themes such as drug addiction and its consequences, relationship troubles, and social indifference. Guest vocalists include Aaron Lewis of Staind and Sierra Swan who would also appear on the band's next album.

== Album art ==
Cold's second album marked the first appearance of the band's spider logo and corresponding text. Its CD booklet design depicts a tattered old book held shut with rubber bands. The liner notes feature morbid figure illustrations and imagery of X-Acto knives and other cutting utensils.

== Touring and promotion ==
Following the album's release, Cold toured for a year and a half to promote it. They embarked on a three-week tour with 3 Doors Down and a month with Marilyn Manson before joining Limp Bizkit and DMX on the Anger Management Tour for a few weeks. Cold (along with the Offspring, Weezer, Social Distortion, Incubus and Adema) was on the bill for the first annual Inland Invasion, which took place on August 25, 2001, and was hosted by the Los Angeles radio station KROQ.

Singles for the album included "Just Got Wicked", "End of the World", "No One" and "Bleed". All of the said tracks had music videos which saw moderate airplay on MTV2. The majority of singles from 13 Ways also received significant radio play and were instrumental in launching Cold into the mainstream music scene.

"Just Got Wicked" appears on MTV: The Return of the Rock, Vol. 2, ECW: Extreme Music Vol. 2: Anarchy Rocks, and the soundtrack to the video game Jet Grind Radio. "No One" is featured on the soundtrack to the film A Walk to Remember.

== Commercial performance ==
The album debuted at #174 on the Billboard 200, selling 6,251 copies in its first week. It later peaked at #98, staying on the chart for 27 weeks. Five months after its release, it had sold 81,046 copies according to Nielsen Soundscan.

In February 2002, the album was certified gold by the RIAA for shipments of over 500,000 copies.

As of 2003, the album has sold 467,000 copies in the US.

=== Accolades ===
Publication	Country	Accolade	Year	Rank
The Nu Metal Agenda	United States	The 100 Greatest Nu Metal Albums of All Time	2024	35

== Track listing ==
All lyrics are written by Scooter Ward; all music is composed by Cold.

No.	Title	Length
1.	"Just Got Wicked"	4:00
2.	"She Said"	4:08
3.	"No One" (featuring Sierra Swan)	3:17
4.	"End of the World"	3:04
5.	"Confession"	3:49
6.	"It's All Good"	3:43
7.	"Send in the Clowns" (featuring Aaron Lewis)	4:13
8.	"Same Drug"	3:43
9.	"Anti-Love Song"	3:10
10.	"Witch" (featuring Sierra Swan)	3:48
11.	"Sick of Man"	4:04
12.	"Outerspace"	3:37
13.	"Bleed" (featuring Aaron Lewis) (also known as "Thirteen" after 9/11)	3:57

Japanese edition
No.	Title	Length
14.	"Ghost in Here" (Demo)	2:48
15.	"Bizarre" (Demo)	3:29

== Personnel ==
Credits adapted from album's liner notes.

Cold

- Scooter Ward – vocals, keyboards, piano, guitars
- Sam McCandless – drums
- Kelly Hayes – guitar
- Terry Balsamo – guitar
- Jeremy Marshall – bass

Additional personnel

- Aaron Lewis – additional vocals on "Send in the Clowns" and "Bleed"
- Sierra Swan – additional vocals on "No One" and "Witch"

Production

- Producers: Cold, Adam Kasper, Chris Vrenna (tracks 1–6, 8, 9, 11), Fred Durst (track 2)
- Engineers: Chris Vrenna (tracks 1–6, 8, 9, 11), Sam Hofstedt (tracks 7, 10, 12, 13)
- Programming: Chris Vrenna
- Mixing: David J. Holman (tracks 1, 2, 4–13), Tom Lord-Alge (track 3)
- Mastering: Louis F. Hemsey
- Executive producer: Jordan Schur
- Art direction: Stefan G. Bucher and Cold
- Production coordination: Les Scurry
- Creative director: Joe Mama-Nitzberg
- Photography: Myriam Santos Kayda, Jason Timss

== Charts ==
Chart (2000)	Peak position
Scottish Albums (Official Charts)	77
UK Albums (Official Charts)	85
US Billboard 200	98
US Heatseekers Albums (Billboard)	1

== Certifications ==
Region	Certification	Certified units/sales
United States (RIAA)	Gold	500,000^{^}
^{^} Shipments figures based on certification alone.

== Acoustic EP ==
An acoustic EP was released as a free bonus disc with the purchase of 13 Ways to Bleed on Stage.

=== Track listing ===
1. "No One (Acoustic)" – 3:16
2. "End of the World (Acoustic)" – 3:37
3. "Just Got Wicked (Acoustic)" – 3:59

==== Track 1 & 3 ====
- Mixed by Ross Hogarth at Master Control
- Produced by Cold

==== Track 2 ====
- Mixed by David J. Holman
- Produced by Cold

=== Credits ===
- All Songs Mastered by Louis F. Hemsey
- Executive Producer – Jordan Schur
- All Songs Written by Cold
- Published by Into Everything Music
- 2001 Flip/Geffen Records
