= Idiot Pilot =

Alternative rock band

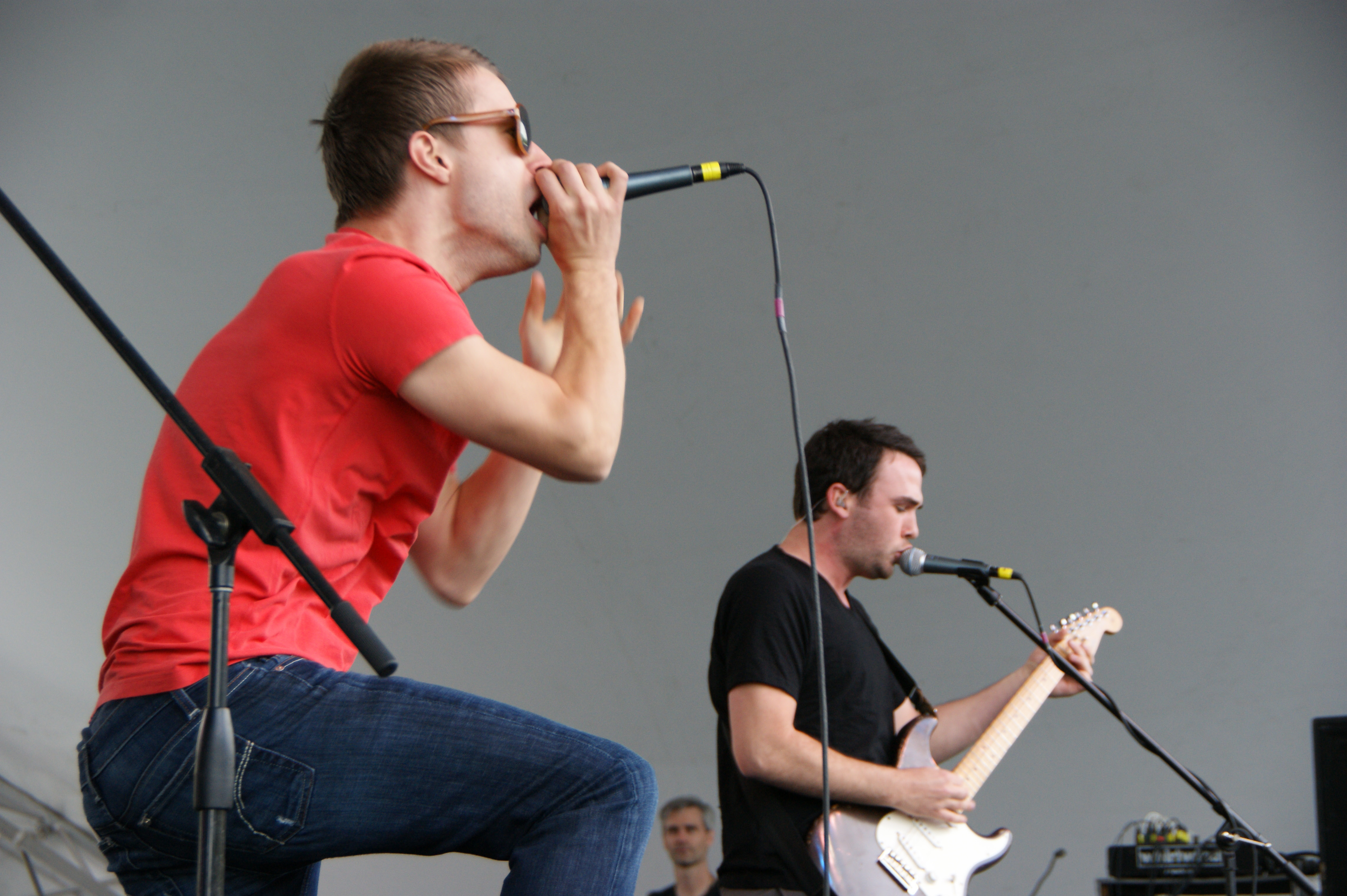

Background information
- Origin: Bellingham, Washington, U.S.
- Genres: Alternative rock; electronic rock; post-hardcore
- Years active: 2003–2011, 2019-present
- Labels: Reprise; Clickpop Records
- Members: Michael Harris; Daniel Anderson

Idiot Pilot is an alternative rock duo from Bellingham, Washington, consisting of Michael Harris and Daniel Anderson.

== History ==
After their previous band, pop-punk outfit Azero Cherry, broke up, high schoolers Michael Harris and Daniel Anderson decided to go it alone and started Idiot Pilot. Their debut album, Strange We Should Meet Here was originally self-released, before they were signed and remastered by Reprise. The band has collaborated with Chino Moreno of Deftones for their B-Sides & Rarities album. They have previously toured in the UK, but have also done stints in the US. These have been with acts such as Team Sleep, +44, The Seal Cub Clubbing Club, The Smashing Pumpkins, and The Used.

They released their second album, Wolves, on October 2, 2007, which was co-produced by Mark Hoppus of +44 and Blink-182, and Ross Robinson (Glassjaw, At the Drive-In, The Blood Brothers). The album features drumming by Chris Pennie of Coheed and Cambria (formerly of the Dillinger Escape Plan) and Travis Barker of +44 and Blink-182. It includes the song "Retina and the Sky", which is on the Transformers soundtrack. They also filmed a video for Retina and the Sky with director Adam Egypt Mortimer. From 2007 they have also included live drummer Ryan Soukkala to their live show as well as Michael playing guitar in addition to singing.

In mid-2007, the duo appeared on the new album of Colorado post-hardcore band Drop Dead, Gorgeous, Worse Than a Fairy Tale. The collaboration was arranged by Ross Robinson, who produced the album.

In 2008, Idiot Pilot toured the United States on the Taste of Chaos tour alongside Avenged Sevenfold, Bullet for My Valentine and Atreyu.

In March 2009, Idiot Pilot chose to leave Reprise Records following the label's merger with parent company Warner Bros., due to poor promotion of their second album, Wolves. Since this time, Harris has toured and recorded with Cold vocalist Scooter Ward's side project The Killer and The Star, playing bass, and more recently toured with Cold as a second guitarist.

In March 2010, Idiot Pilot released a new song, "The Tail of a Jet Black Swan", through their official website as a pay-what-you-want download. It is unknown as to whether the single will be included on their upcoming third album or not.

In January 2011, Idiot Pilot announced an indefinite hiatus, writing on their website: "After months of recording, working and pouring our hearts into more Idiot Pilot material, we have decided to take a moment to ourselves." Weeks later, it was announced that a compilation of unreleased material spanning the group's career would be in the works and ready for a release later in the year.

In February 2019 the band officially ended their hiatus with the announcement via their official website of their third studio album, Blue Blood, which the band self-released on March 12, 2019.

== Members ==
- Michael Harris – vocals, guitar, drums
- Daniel Anderson – guitar, bass, programming, keyboards, vocals

Touring members

- Ryan Soukkala – drums (2007–2009)
- Chris Newton – drums (2010)
- Dimiter Yordanov – bass (2010)

== Discography ==
- Strange We Should Meet Here (2004)
- Wolves (2007)
- Blue Blood (2019)
