= Clickpop Records =

Record label based in Washington, U.S.

- Founder: Paul Turpin, Dave Richards
- Country of origin: U.S.
- Location: Bellingham, Washington

Clickpop Records is an independent record label in Bellingham, Washington, that releases music predominantly from the Pacific Northwest. Bands who have achieved this goal to some degree include Idiot Pilot (who signed with Reprise Records shortly after releasing the first album) and The Trucks who have gained a nationwide audience and have been featured on the cable TV program The L Word.

Founded by Paul Turpin and Dave Richards, the label has also put out albums by Kristin Allen-Zito (a member of The Trucks), Jenni Potts, Black Eyes & Neckties, Darin Schaffer, Scatterbox, Prosser, and Delay. From 2006 through 2007, the label had a co-release deal with SpinArt Records. This resulted in widespread promotion and distribution through Rykodisc, particularly regarding early albums by The Trucks and Prosser that were released during that time. There is also an electronic music imprint, Memex Records, which was created in 2006.

== Catalog ==
- cp001 – Idiot Pilot Strange We Should Meet Here – 2004
- cp002 – Kristin Allen-Zito Helium – 2004
- cp003 – Prosser Prosser (s/t) – 2006
- cp004 – The Trucks The Trucks (s/t) – 2006
- cp005 – Delay Delay (s/t) – 2007
- cp006 – The Trucks Titties EP (remixes) – 2007
- cp007 – Jenni Potts The Fourth EP – 2007
- cp008 – Jenni Potts Take This and Go – 2008
- cp009 – The Trucks Zombie remix CD EP – 2008
- cp010 – The Trucks Zombie remix 12" Vinyl – 2008
- cp011 – The Trucks Never Forever – 2008
- cp012 – Various artists compilation Music from the Center of the Universe (Bellingham) Vol. 1 – 2008 (co-released with Murder Mountain Records – cat is also MMR009)
- cp013 – Black Eyes & Neckties Apparition! – 2008

== See also ==
- List of record labels
