= Year of the Spider =

Studio album by Cold
- Released: May 13, 2003
- Recorded: September–December 2002
- Studios: Bay 7 Studios (Valley Village, California); Sparky Dark Studios (Calabasas, California); Capitol Studios (Los Angeles, California)
- Genres: Alternative rock; post-grunge; alternative metal; nu metal
- Length: 63:43
- Labels: Flip; Geffen
- Producers: Howard Benson; Cold

Cold chronology
13 Ways to Bleed on Stage (2000)	Year of the Spider (2003)	A Different Kind of Pain (2005)

Singles from Year of the Spider
- 1. "Stupid Girl" Released: March 18, 2003; 2. "Suffocate" Released: June 10, 2003

Professional ratings
Review scores
Source	Rating
AllMusic	4/5 stars
Blender	2/5 stars
The Encyclopedia of Popular Music	3/5 stars
Melodic	4/5 stars
Rolling Stone	2/5 stars
USA Today	2.5/4 stars

Year of the Spider is the third studio album by the American rock band Cold. It was released on May 13, 2003, through Geffen Records. The album was Cold's most commercially successful, debuting at number three on the Billboard album charts, with over 101,000 copies sold in its first week. Early pressings of Year of the Spider were shipped with a DVD and a temporary tattoo of the Cold spider logo. The DVD included the making of the (as well as the actual) video for "Stupid Girl", fan testimonials, and some home video shot during the recording of the album. This is also the last album with guitarists Terry Balsamo and Kelly Hayes.

== Background ==
A year prior to the album's release, the mellow ballad "Gone Away" was released on the WWF Tough Enough 2 soundtrack. Its music video, which met with considerable airplay upon release, listed it as from the album Year of the Spider despite the long wait for its release. "Gone Away" was subsequently used as a hidden track; the song begins at 16:06 on "Kill the Music Industry" after 13 minutes and 13 seconds of silence (a reference to the superstitious nature of the band's previous effort 13 Ways to Bleed on Stage). The song "Came All The Way" was a B-side, which was cut late from the album. It's mentioned on the back cover of the album's booklet. It was later released on the Psi Ops soundtrack.

The album was frequently postponed from its projected release date. As early as April 2002, Year of the Spider was scheduled by Geffen for an October 2002 release. Frontman Scooter Ward also expected Elias Soriano of Nonpoint to contribute, but this did not come to fruition.

== Composition and lyrics ==
With producer Howard Benson on hand, Year of the Spider is significantly more commercial than its dark predecessor, 13 Ways to Bleed on Stage. It features a variety of guitar styles, violin, viola, and cello, and digital effects as well as a number of power ballads. While still dwelling on topics like drug abuse and relationships, other topics are covered. "Cure My Tragedy" deals with the struggle with the cancer Scooter Ward's sister was having during the album's recording. "The Day Seattle Died" is about the deaths of grunge icons Kurt Cobain and Layne Staley. The band originally called the song "Kurt", but decided to pay homage to Staley as well after contemplating the apathy of the media towards his death; "[Staley] dies, and he doesn't even get on the front page of Rolling Stone. I have to do somethin'- not that I matter at all, but it matters to me." The album's final song, "Kill the Music Industry", was not directly about any record label or individual, but the state of the music industry, according to Scooter Ward; "I hate all the bullshit they try to cram down your throat. Every kind of music I hear has no emotion to it anymore- no feeling, no depth in the lyrics."

== Singles ==
"Stupid Girl", served as the album's lead single and was the only Cold single to crack the Billboard Hot 100, where it peaked at number 87. Its music video garnered frequent airplay as well. Like "Gone Away", the introductory song "Remedy" was used by WWE as the theme for the Backlash 2003 pay-per-view.

Following the release of the album's second single, "Suffocate", to radio stations, plans were set-forth for a video to accompany the song. However, for reasons unknown, Geffen refused to make the video or promote the album any further. The song was used in the promotional package for Scott Steiner versus Test at Unforgiven 2003. The stalemate with the label led to frustrations within the band, and in early 2004, Terry Balsamo departed, replacing Ben Moody as lead guitarist in Evanescence. Balsamo was later replaced by ex-Darwin's Waiting Room guitarist Eddie Rendini. The band made efforts to release another single in "Wasted Years", but Geffen stayed true to their earlier promise by not financing or promoting the album any further.

== Track listing ==
All songs written by Scooter Ward, except "Stupid Girl", by Ward and Rivers Cuomo

No.	Title	Length
1.	"Remedy"	2:57
2.	"Suffocate" (featuring Sierra Swan)	3:39
3.	"Cure My Tragedy (A Letter to God)"	3:55
4.	"Stupid Girl"	3:09
5.	"Don't Belong"	3:40
6.	"Wasted Years"	4:07
7.	"Whatever You Became"	3:45
8.	"Sad Happy"	3:36
9.	"Rain Song"	3:37
10.	"The Day Seattle Died"	3:34
11.	"Change the World"	4:01
12.	"Black Sunday"	4:30
13.	"Kill the Music Industry" (listed as "Kill the Fucking Music Industry" in album booklet)	19:13

- "Kill the Music Industry" ends at 2:56; a hidden track titled "Gone Away" starts at 16:06 after 13:13 of silence – a reference to the superstitious nature of their previous effort 13 Ways to Bleed on Stage.

== Personnel ==
Credits adapted from album's liner notes.

Cold

- Scooter Ward – vocals
- Kelly Hayes – lead guitar
- Terry Balsamo – rhythm guitar, acoustic guitar
- Jeremy Marshall – bass
- Sam McCandless – drums

Additional musicians

- Howard Benson – piano solo (track 10), keyboards and programming
- Samuel Fischer – violin (track 6)
- Julie Gigante – violin (track 6)
- Roland Kato – viola (track 6)
- Armen Ksajikian – cello (track 6)
- Ana Landauer – violin (track 6)
- Songa Lee – violin (track 6)
- Phillipe Levy – violin (track 6)
- David Low – cello, contractor (track 6)
- Deborah Lurie – conductor and string arrangements (track 6)
- Simon Oswell – viola (track 6)
- David Speltz – cello (track 6)
- Sierra Swan – vocals (track 2)
- Michael Valerio – string bass (track 6)
- Evan Wilson – viola (track 6)

Artwork

- Jason Harter – art direction, design
- Olaf Heine – photography

Production

- Dan Adam – digital editing
- Howard Benson – producer, programming
- Ted Jensen – mastering
- Vince Jones – digital editing
- Jason Lader – digital editing
- Chris Lord-Alge – mixing
- Eric Miller – digital editing, additional engineering
- Mike Plotnikoff – engineer, digital editing
- Mark Robertson – concertmaster
- Casey Stone – strings engineer

Management

- Scott Adair – business manager
- Sean Ballhorn – business manager
- Desiree Barlow – management
- Terri DiPaolo – legal representation
- Tom Donnell – merchandise
- Fred Durst – A&R
- Darryl Eaton – booking agent
- Paul Geary – management
- Dhenys Lau – merchandise
- Jenn Littleton – A&R
- Peter Lubin – merchandise
- Martie Muhoberac – production coordination
- Jordan Schur – executive producer, A&R
- Les Scurry – production coordination
- Ron Valeri – management

== Charts ==
=== Weekly charts ===
Weekly chart performance for Year of the Spider
Chart (2003)	Peak position
Canadian Albums (Nielsen SoundScan)	50
UK Albums (OCC)	144
UK Rock & Metal Albums (Official Charts)	17
US Billboard 200	3

=== Year-end charts ===
Year-end chart performance for Year of the Spider
Chart (2003)	Position
US Billboard 200	180

== Certifications ==
Certifications for Year of the Spider
Region	Certification	Certified units/sales
United States (RIAA)	Gold	500,000^{^}
^{^} Shipments figures based on certification alone.
