= A Different Kind of Pain =

Studio album by Cold
- Released: August 30, 2005
- Recorded: December 2004 – January 2005
- Studio: Studio Barbarossa (Bavon, Virginia) Bearsville Studios (Bearsville, New York)
- Genres: Post-grunge; alternative rock
- Length: 42:32
- Labels: Flip; Atlantic; Lava
- Producer: Michael "Elvis" Baskette

Cold chronology
Year of the Spider (2003)	A Different Kind of Pain (2005)	Superfiction (2011)

Singles from A Different Kind of Pain
- 1. "Happens All the Time" Released: June 21, 2005; 2. "A Different Kind of Pain" Released: December 6, 2005

A Different Kind of Pain is the fourth studio album by the American rock band Cold. It was released on August 30, 2005 in the US and September 12, 2005 in the UK and features the singles "Happens All the Time" and "A Different Kind of Pain". It has sold over 160,000 copies in the US and would be Cold's last album before their nearly three-year breakup beginning in 2006.

The time of the album's recording and release marks a turbulent period for Cold with the band signing to a new record label, experiencing numerous lineup changes, and obtaining weakened commercial success. Frontman Scooter Ward's struggles with his sister's cancer as well as the fallout of the relationship with his fiancé during this time also provided lyrical inspiration. The result, A Different Kind of Pain, expands on the melodic, less aggressive sound that the band had begun exploring with 2003's Year of the Spider.

== Background ==
In March 2004, Cold was in the process of seeking a new record label after leaving their previous label, Geffen, due to disputes over the promotion of Year of the Spider. By May, they were in discussions of signing to Lava Records, and officially signed to the label in July. Upon the group's return to Jacksonville from touring, Ward briefly checked himself into rehab.

By September 2004, the band had added former member Matt Loughran, and they set about recording a new album. It was to be produced by Elvis Baskette and slated to be released in December 2004. However, Cold suffered another blow with Eddie Rendini leaving the band. The new album was then scheduled for a spring 2005 release before Cold decided to head back to the studio and record several more tracks. In June 2005, the band's official website noted a third and final change to the album's title. Two previous working titles were And a Sad Song Lives On and The Calm That Killed the Storm; however, it was again changed to broaden the interpretation of the album's songs. The song "Anatomy of a Tidal Wave" was originally called The Calm That Killed the Storm.

== Composition and lyrics ==
The name and much of the album's lyrics were inspired by Ward's sister Jen's battle with cancer. In fact, the band wrote much of the material in Ward's parents' house, particularly in Jen's room. Ward described the making of the album as "a healing process", and fortunately, as the band was finishing up, his sister had gone into remission. Given the record's primary source of inspiration, A Different Kind of Pain maintains the visceral, anxious tones characteristic of Cold's sound yet strays from the band's typical aggression. Instead, it focuses almost entirely on perseverance through love and personal struggle which, while still conjuring a somber atmosphere, provides a distinctly more uplifting and spiritual presence that the group notably began exploring on Year of the Spider. This is evident "God's Song", one of various tracks laced with religious themes. Other subjects include the end of Ward's relationship to his fiancé and mother of his daughter and the physical abuse of a 14-year-old girl by her father. In a first for Cold, the album also includes a trudging piano ballad in the form of its title track.

== Release and reception ==
=== Commercial success ===
The album faced multiple delays until its release in August 2005. The album was expected to sell 40,000-50,000 copies upon its release. It debuted at number 26 on the Billboard 200, with more than 36,000 copies sold, falling behind expectations. A Different Kind of Pain would ultimately sell over 160,000 copies in the US, failing to match the success of its major label predecessors.

Cold's fourth album featured the lead single "Happens All the Time", which managed to chart modestly on both Mainstream Rock and Modern Rock Tracks in 2005. "Happens All the Time" appeared as a sample track on all Xbox 360 Premium Systems. A music video was also filmed in which the band performs on a cloudy beach. Frontman Scooter Ward is also shown unconscious following a car accident on the rocky shore. Paramedics attempt to resuscitate him as a concerned crowd of youth, as well as the band members and Ward himself, watches on. Finally, Ward's hand reaches out and grabs the wrist of the paramedic as the video comes to a close.

The album's title track served as a follow-up single and similarly charted modestly; however, a music video was not filmed.

The album is planned to be rereleased on vinyl for the first time on May 10, 2024.

=== Critical response ===
Professional ratings
Review scores
Source	Rating
AllMusic	2.5/5 stars
Blabbermouth.net	5/10
E! Online	B−
The Encyclopedia of Popular Music	3/5 stars
PopMatters	3/10

A Different Kind of Pain received mixed reviews. Critics were largely bothered by the album's spiritual undertones and emotional emphasis and also claimed that the band strayed too far from its heavy roots. Johnny Loftus of Allmusic summed it up with "Different Kind of Pain might work as therapy, but it falters musically."

== Track listing ==
All songs written by Scooter Ward and Sam McCandless, except where noted.

No.	Title	Length
1.	"Back Home"	4:31
2.	"Feel It in Your Heart"	3:46
3.	"Anatomy of a Tidal Wave"	4:27
4.	"A Different Kind of Pain"	5:19
5.	"Another Pill" (Ward, McCandless, Matt Loughran)	3:45
6.	"Happens All the Time"	3:28
7.	"When Heaven's Not Far Away" (Ward, McCandless, Loughran)	3:06
8.	"God's Song"	3:13
9.	"When Angels Fly Away"	3:58
10.	"Tell Me Why"	3:21
11.	"Ocean"	3:46

Bonus CD
No.	Title	Length
12.	"Check Please"	3:53
13.	"Wasted Years (Piano/Strings Version)"	3:52

== Personnel ==
Credits adapted from album's liner notes.

Cold

- Scooter Ward – vocals, piano, additional guitars
- Matt Loughran – lead guitar
- Mike Booth – rhythm guitar
- Jeremy Marshall – bass
- Sam McCandless – drums

Additional personnel

- Michael "Elvis" Baskette – producer, all keyboards, string arrangements
- Dave Holdredge – engineer, cello
- Jeff Moll – digital editing
- Damien Shannon – additional editing
- Brian Sperberg – additional piano
- Ben Grosse – mixing
- Ted Jensen – mastering

== Charts ==
Album – Billboard (United States)

Year	Chart	Position
2005	The Billboard 200	26

Singles – Billboard (United States)

Year	Single	Chart	Position
2005	"Happens All the Time"	Mainstream Rock Tracks	21
2005	"Happens All the Time"	Modern Rock Tracks	29
2006	"A Different Kind of Pain"	Mainstream Rock Tracks	35
2006	"A Different Kind of Pain"	Modern Rock Tracks	38
