= Cold (band) =

American rock band

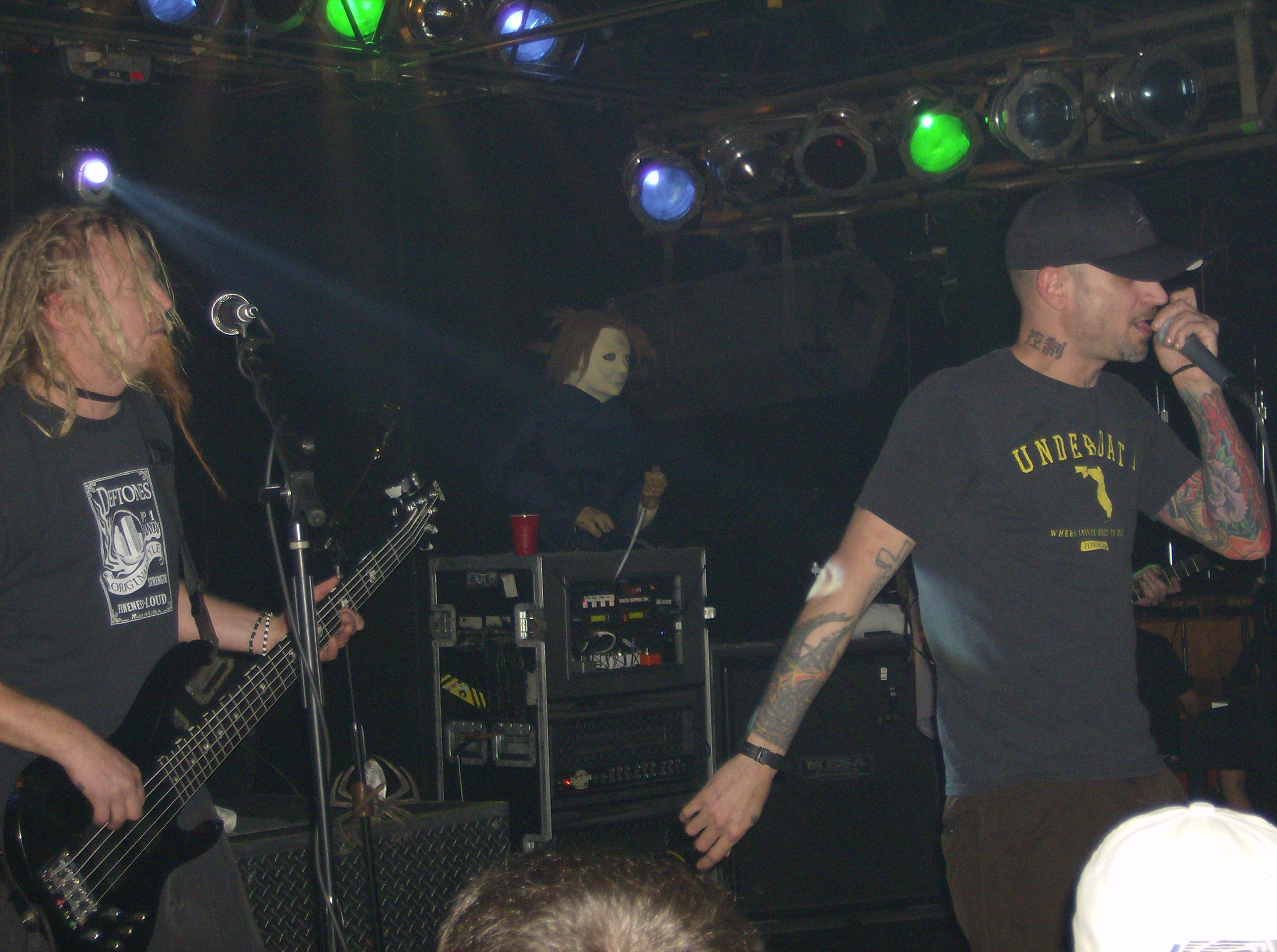
- Cold performing in 2009

Background information
- Also known as: Grundig (1986–1995); Diablo (1995–1996)
- Origin: Neptune Beach, Florida, U.S.
- Genres: Post-grunge; alternative metal; nu metal; alternative rock
- Years active: 1986–2006; 2009–present
- Labels: Flip; A&M; Geffen; Lava; SonicStar; Eleven Seven; Napalm
- Spinoffs: The Killer and the Star
- Members: Scooter Ward; Lindsay Manfredi; Tony Kruzska; Angelo Maruzzelli; Dave Pike
- Past members: Zac Gilbert; Drew Molleur; Matt Loughran; Pat Lally; Sean Lay; Kelly Hayes; Eddie Rendini; Mike Booth; Joe Bennett; Michael Harris; Jeremy Marshall; Terry Balsamo; Ethan York; Sam McCandless; Nick Coyle; Jonny Nova; Ed Cuozzo
- Website: coldarmy.com

Cold is an American rock band formed in 1986 in Neptune Beach, Florida. Co-founded by lead singer and rhythm guitarist Scooter Ward, drummer Sam McCandless, bassist Jeremy Marshall, and lead guitarist Matt Loughran, the band has undergone numerous lineup changes with Ward being its only constant member.

In 1997, at the urging of Fred Durst, Flip Records/A&M Records signed Cold to a recording contract. The band's debut album, Cold (1998), sold poorly due to A&M's closure in the months following its release, resulting in the band moving to Geffen Records. Cold found mainstream success with 13 Ways to Bleed on Stage (2000) and its follow-up Year of the Spider (2003), which saw the band incorporate influences of post-grunge and alternative rock into their sound; both albums were certified Gold by the RIAA, with the latter reaching number three on the Billboard 200 chart and producing the band's only single to chart on the Billboard Hot 100, "Stupid Girl". However, Cold would soon part ways with Geffen in March 2004 over disputes surrounding the promotion of Year of the Spider, and went through a succession of lineup changes throughout the rest of the year.

Cold signed with Lava Records in July 2004, who released their fourth album, A Different Kind of Pain (2005); the album's more sombre, downbeat tone alienated fans and subsequently failed to repeat the success of the band's prior albums. After a period of uncertainty, Cold announced their disbandment In November 2006. In July 2008, it was announced that the classic line-up would reunite for a tour in early 2009, which later spiralled into a fully fledged reunion. The band have since released two more studio albums; Superfiction in 2011, and their most recent album, The Things We Can't Stop, in 2019.

== History ==
=== Early history (1986–1998) ===
Cold, who at the time were called Grundig, formed in 1986 with the line-up of Scooter Ward (vocals, rhythm guitar), Sam McCandless (drums), Jeremy Marshall (bass) and Matt Loughran (lead guitar) at Fletcher High School in Neptune Beach, Florida. The band played their first gig in 1990 at a club called the Spray. In 1992, the band released an 8-song EP called "Into Everything".

Initially based in Jacksonville, Florida, they moved to Atlanta, Georgia, hoping to get a break in the industry. During this time, Matt Loughran left the band and was replaced by Sean Lay, who also left the group. Kelly Hayes then joined, and they all later returned to Florida. Three and a half years later in 1995, Grundig broke up and Ward moved back to Jacksonville, where he, McCandless, Kelly Hayes, and Pat Lally formed the band Diablo. Diablo would only last about three months. At the end of that three-month period, Grundig reformed under the name Cold in 1996.

=== Self titled album (1998–2000) ===
Following Cold's progress in the Jacksonville scene was local Fred Durst. Impressed by what he had heard, he invited Ward to record two acoustic tracks, "Check Please" and "Ugly." The two demos were passed on to producer Ross Robinson, who was also impressed by what he had heard, leading the recently renamed Cold to record their debut album titled Cold in 1997.

In 1997, Cold was signed to Flip Records, with distribution through the major label A&M Records. Cold was released in 1998, and received positive reviews from critics. However, shortly after its release, A&M folded due to the Universal Music Group–PolyGram merger, resulting in the album's promotion being suddenly cut, which hurt the album's sales greatly; Flip Records' founder, Jordan Schur, described the album as being "a car shut off in midgear", and thus only managed to sell just below 40,000 copies in the US. However, thanks to Schur, Cold avoided being dropped by UMG during the merger, and soon after Flip transferred the band's contract over to Geffen Records, where Schur had just been named president of, in 1999. Regardless of the label's poor promotion of the album, Cold soon opened for Limp Bizkit and Soulfly during a brief European tour in the spring of 1998.

That same year, the band released the Oddity EP. Its cover photo, taken by the wife of McCandless, depicts their pet tarantula named Wednesday, crawling on the face of her doll. The band sought a signature element that fans could remember them by, and Wednesday served as the inspiration; McCandless gave a particularly favorable image of a spider to a friend and tattoo artist who transformed it into what would become Cold's official logo. The drummer would later note, "Our music kind of creeps along like a spider."

=== 13 Ways to Bleed on Stage (2000–2002) ===
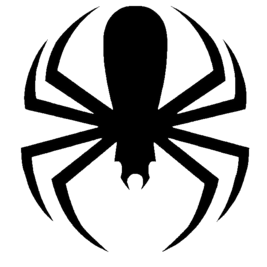
The "Spider" logo, which has been used on most of Cold's releases since 2000.

Geffen financed their second album titled 13 Ways to Bleed on Stage, which was released on September 12, 2000. In 1999 before recording the album, the group recruited local guitarist Terry Balsamo, who briefly played for Limp Bizkit. With the new guitar addition Ward was now able to focus more on singing and interacting with the crowd. 13 Ways to Bleed on Stage proved to be Cold's breakthrough album with successful singles in "End of the World" and "No One" frequently played on hard rock radio, with "No One" hitting No. 17 on Mainstream Rock Tracks and No. 13 on Modern Rock Tracks, and the music video being put in heavy rotation on MTV2. The album included guest singer Aaron Lewis from Staind on the songs "Send in the Clowns" and "Bleed" and singer Sierra Swan from Dollshead on "No One" and "Witch". The song "Just Got Wicked" was also a surprise hit, being featured in the soundtrack to the game Jet Grind Radio and hitting No. 25 on Mainstream Rock tracks, which aided in the band's popularity.

In April 2002, the band released "Gone Away, "a surprisingly moody ballad. The song first appeared on the WWF Tough Enough 2 album and had a successful music video.

=== Year of the Spider and split with Geffen (2002–2004) ===
With the success of 13 Ways to Bleed on Stage, Geffen financed their third major album titled Year of the Spider, which was released on May 13, 2003 (It was slated to release in October 2002, but was pushed back). The album has been to date the band's most commercially successful album, debuting at No. 3 on the Billboard Album charts, with over 101,000 copies of the album sold in its first week of release.[Cold at AllMusic] The album's first single, "Stupid Girl," has been the only Cold single to crack the Billboard Hot 100, peaking at No. 87. Following the release of the album's second single "Suffocate" to radio stations, plans were set-forth for a video to accompany the song. However, a music video was not made due to Geffen not giving approval. The stalemate with the label led to frustrations within the band, and in January 2004 Terry Balsamo departed, replacing Ben Moody in Evanescence. Balsamo was later replaced by ex-Darwin's Waiting Room guitarist Eddie Randini, the following month.

In April 2004, guitarist Kelly Hayes quit the band as well. A week later, Hayes officially confirmed his position as the guitarist in the Jacksonville hard rock outfit Allele, a move that had been in the works from the time Terry Balsamo left the band. The band made efforts to release another single, "Wasted Years" from Year of the Spider. However, Geffen continued to not support the album any further.

Subsequently, in March 2004, Cold parted ways with Geffen. Around this time, Cold recorded the soundtrack for the video game Psi-Ops: The Mindgate Conspiracy featuring the songs "With My Mind", "Came All the Way" a b-side from Year of the Spider, "Just Got Wicked (Chris Vrenna Remix)", and "Go Away (Chris Vrenna Eye Socket Remix)" and embarked on a short tour with Sevendust in support of "With My Mind", the single released from the CD. They also performed at E3 to promote the game; however, the song was never released on any of their albums.

=== Lava Records, A Different Kind of Pain and breakup (2004–2006) ===
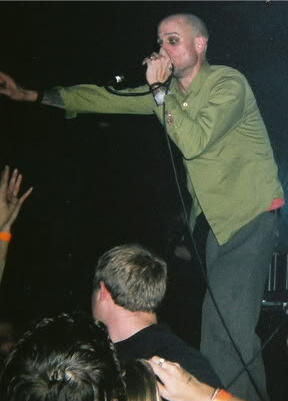
Cold performing in 2005

In May 2004, it was reported that Cold was considering signing with Lava Records, a division of Atlantic Records, with the band officially signing to the label that July. By September 2004, the band had added former member Matt Loughran and set about recording a new album. The album was to be produced by Elvis Baskette and slated to be released in December 2004. However, Cold suffered another blow with Eddie Rendini leaving the band on November 14, 2004. The new album was scheduled to be released in spring of 2005. Before releasing the album, Cold went back in the studio to record several more tracks. The album was originally to be titled And a Sad Song Lives On but was later changed to The Calm that Killed the Storm, and the release date was moved to September 13, 2005.

In June 2005, the band's official website noted yet another change to the new album's title, changing it to A Different Kind of Pain. "Happens All the Time" was the first single and video released. Just prior to shooting the video, the band added Las Vegas guitarist Mike Booth to the band. He would appear in the video and tour with them for a few months, being replaced later that fall by Florida-native Zac Gilbert. The album debuted at No. 26 on the Billboard Albums charts with more than 36,000 copies sold. A Different Kind of Pain was the beginning of a significant departure from the more radio-friendly alternative metal sound that was featured in the prior two albums. The title track was released as the second single, but Atlantic did not fund another video. The majority of A Different Kind of Pain was written in Ward's sister's bedroom while she battled cancer, and is said to have been the root of the subject matter on the album. Other subjects include the end of his relationship to his fiancée/mother of his daughter, and the physical abuse of a 14-year-old girl by her own father, and also had an alcoholic mother (a theme echoed from each of the three previous albums). The album has sold over 160,000 copies in the US.

On November 17, 2006, a MySpace post announced that Cold had decided to disband permanently. Ward announced that he and Sam McCandless had started a side-project called The Witch, later known as When November Falls and now known as The Killer and the Star. Shortly after forming, McCandless left the project.

=== Reunion and Superfiction (2008–2012) ===
On July 25, 2008, a blog written by Ward on The Killer and the Star's MySpace confirmed both a b-sides/rarities release and a new Cold album featuring the classic line-up, due Fall 2009.

In January 2009, Cold officially announced the first dates of its reunion tour on the band's MySpace page. When the page was originally updated, the lineup consisted of Scooter Ward, Sam McCandless, Jeremy Marshall, Kelly Hayes and Terry Balsamo. Hayes was replaced by Joe Bennett, who parted ways with Cold in July 2009 and has been replaced by former Cold guitarist Zac Gilbert. Terry Balsamo was briefly replaced by Michael Harris of Idiot Pilot, who also played bass in The Killer and the Star. After the first tour in the spring, the band went out on the road again later that summer.

Cold confirmed on their site that the album had a release in mid-July 2011. Although initially dubbed the "final album," Ward has said on "Alternative Addiction" that Cold will continue to record and tour after the 5th album comes out. The first official single from Superfiction was "Wicked World".

Superfiction was released on July 18, 2011, through Eleven Seven. The album debuted at No. 37 on the Billboard 200 with 11,317 copies sold. The band had mentioned while touring that they would be including a live version of their song "Snowblind" as a hidden track on the new album, though many fans who have purchased the album noticed that there was no hidden track at all. "Snowblind" was released 8 years later, as a track on their sixth album, The Things That We Can't Stop. The second single from the album, "American Dream", was released on January 1, 2012. The music video for it was released through Eleven Seven official YouTube channel two weeks later.

=== COLD:LIVE and departure of Jeremy Marshall (2012–2016) ===
In November 2012, Scooter Ward revealed via Facebook that Cold was going to record an acoustic album of fan favorites from the first four albums, b-sides, rarities and four new songs in 2013. In April 2013, Ward reported that in addition to the acoustic record a double live album was set to be recorded in May 2013 in Jacksonville. Since then there was no news about the acoustic album with the recording of the live album being pushed back.

On February 7, 2014, Cold started an Indiegogo campaign for the recording of the double live album and DVD, initially titled Live in Orlando and later renamed to COLD:LIVE. The campaign ended with 167% of the goal raised. On February 28, Cold played their first gig in almost three years in Central Florida Fair with Saliva.

On April 28, 2014, the show date & location for the Live DVD were announced - July 12, Jacksonville Beach, Florida. The band also performed a gig as Grundig on July 11, 2014, and re-recorded the 6-track live set (originally recorded at Furies in 1996) with intentions to release the record digitally. On July 12, 2014, the band played and recorded a live concert at University of North Florida Theater of 27 songs in total, including special piano/acoustic performances of "Black Sunday", "Bleed", "Cure My Tragedy" and "Rain Song" and special guest appearances such as Damien Starkey of Burn Season/Puddle of Mudd who performed "Suffocate" with the band onstage and drummer Ethan York who played on "Just Got Wicked".

On November 11, 2014, the band announced via Facebook that Jeremy Marshall left Cold to pursue another band called Fall to June and was replaced by Lindsay Manfredi. On January 30, 2015, former band member Eddie Rendini died.

After much delay, COLD:LIVE, directed and edited by the band's former guitarist Drew Molleur, was independently released by the band on January 27, 2016, on DVD, Blu-Ray and a double CD via their official site.

=== Line-up changes and The Things We Can't Stop (2016–2020) ===
On March 13, 2015, it was announced that Cold signed the deal with Napalm Records to release a new album and play a worldwide tour in 2016. According to a post on Cold's Facebook page on July 8, 2016, Terry Balsamo has returned to the band, and that they would begin recording their next album in August 2016.

On January 1, 2017, Nick Coyle (former singer of Lifer, myDownfall and The Drama Club) announced that he joined Cold as their new guitar player. It was later confirmed by the band. On January 11, 2017, Cold entered the studio to record their new album.

On January 14, 2018, vocalist Scooter Ward posted an update via the band's Facebook page that the new album has undergone the final stages of production and they will announce the album title, artwork and release date by next month. He also announced new members Ethan York and Jonny Nova to round out the new lineup. Terry Balsamo and Sam McCandless would not be a part of the new album or tour, instead electing to pursue other commitments. McCandless was working on his new project The Cocky Bitches, along with his comic book ventures.

On June 27, 2019, Cold announced that The Things We Can't Stop, their first album in eight years, would be released on September 13, 2019. The band later started their "Broken Human Tour" to promote the album. During the tour, McCandless returned to the band taking over York's position and later re-joined the band full-time. The band also released music videos for "Without You" on September 18, 2019, followed by "Run" on December 19, 2019, and "Quiet Now" on April 1, 2020. The band later announced "A Different Kind of Tour" concerts in 2020 but was postponed due to the impact of the COVID-19 pandemic.

=== Continued touring, anniversary shows and upcoming seventh studio album (2021–present) ===
The band would return to touring a year later, beginning in the fall of 2021. McCandless did not participate in the tour as he focused on his other ventures. Tony Kruszka would later join as their drummer in September 2021.

Cold announced that they would be touring in celebration of the 20th anniversary of Year of the Spider from March - May 2023. Prior to the tour, Coyle and Nova left the band on February 14, 2023 to pursue their musical ventures with Death Valley Dreams. Ed Cuozzo and Angelo Maruzzelli of University Drive joined as guitarists. Cold would later add more dates for their Year of the Spider 20th anniversary tour through September 2023; playing only east coast dates for this leg of the tour. The band has also been working on new material for their seventh studio album. The band held anniversary shows commemorating both 13 Ways to Bleed on Stage and A Different Kind of Pain from April to June 2025. The band held a "Beneath The Low Hum Tour: A Special Evening Of Songs Reimagined" shows at City Winery locations for fall 2025, which was joined by Sierra Swan.

The band announced the "Goodbye Cruel World" tour for April to June 2026, performing the self-titled album in its entirety. Prior to the show, some of the shows were rescheduled or cancelled due to a family emergency, however, the rest of the dates remained unaffected. They will also be touring in the UK with Hed PE and MÜ for September and October 2026 shows. During the tour, Kruszka was hospitalized and was unable to join the tour while Cuozzo mutually left the band in order to focus on University Drive. Jose a.k.a. El Drumwrench is filling in for Kruszka while Cold's guitar tech Dave Pike will take over Cuozzo's place.

== Musical style and influences ==
Cold has been described as alternative rock, hard rock, nu metal, alternative metal and post-grunge. Their musical influences include AC/DC, U2, The Cure, Depeche Mode, Black Sabbath, Rush, Queensrÿche, Tool, Radiohead, Korn and Deftones.

== Band members ==
Current members

- Scooter Ward – lead vocals, keyboards, rhythm guitar (1986–2006, 2009–present)
- Lindsay Manfredi – bass (2014–present)
- Tony Kruszka – drums (2021–present)
- Angelo Maruzzelli – rhythm guitar, backing vocals (2023–present)
- Dave Pike – lead guitar (2026–present)

Former members

- Matt Loughran – lead guitar (1986–1992, 2004–2006)
- Jeremy Marshall – bass, backing vocals (1986–1995, 1996–2006, 2009–2014)
- Sam McCandless – drums (1986–2006, 2009–2015, 2019–2021)
- Sean Lay – lead guitar (1992)
- Kelly Hayes – lead guitar (1992–2004, 2009)
- Pat Lally – bass (1995–1996)
- Terry Balsamo – rhythm guitar (1999–2004, 2009, 2016–2018)
- Eddie Rendini – rhythm guitar (2004; died 2015)
- Mike Booth – rhythm guitar, keyboards (2005)
- Zac Gilbert – rhythm guitar (2005–2006), lead guitar (2005–2006, 2009–2016)
- Joe Bennett – lead guitar (2009)
- Michael Harris – rhythm guitar (2009)
- Drew Molleur – rhythm guitar, backing vocals (2010–2016)
- Ethan York – drums (2017–2019)
- Nick Coyle – lead guitar, backing vocals (2017–2023), keyboards (2021–2023)
- Jonny Nova – rhythm guitar (2018–2023), programming (2021–2023)
- Ed Cuozzo - lead guitar, backing vocals (2023–2026)

Timeline

== Discography ==
- Cold (1998)
- 13 Ways to Bleed on Stage (2000)
- Year of the Spider (2003)
- A Different Kind of Pain (2005)
- Superfiction (2011)
- The Things We Can't Stop (2019)
