= Cold (Cold album) =

Studio album by Cold
- Released: January 20, 1998
- Recorded: 1997
- Studio: Indigo Ranch Studios (Malibu, California)
- Genre: Nu metal; alternative metal
- Length: 49:26
- Label: Flip; A&M
- Producer: Ross Robinson

Cold chronology
Cold (1998)	13 Ways to Bleed on Stage (2000)

Singles from Cold
- 1. "Give" Released: Late 1997; 2. "Go Away" Released: May 17, 1998

Professional ratings
Review scores
Source	Rating
AllMusic	4/5 stars
The Encyclopedia of Popular Music	4/5 stars
Kerrang!	5/5 stars

Cold is the debut studio album by the American rock band Cold. The album produced two singles: "Go Away" and "Give".

== Background ==
Regarding the album's producer Ross Robinson, vocalist Scooter Ward stated "Ross is, to me, the best metal producer you can get. He just drags the heaviness out of everything, like with Slipknot. It's amazing what he does. When you record with Ross one time, you gotta give it your all. You have to go off like you would onstage."

When they began recording the album in 1997, Cold were known as Grundig. During the recording process, Ward learned that German stereo manufacturer Grundig was trying to sue him and the band for $300,000 over use of its name. Ward reflected "I thought, what are you talking about? We don't have any money. Everybody was throwing names around. Wes, the Limp Bizkit guitarist, said he had a great idea: Cold. It was the perfect name. It fits the music."

The album is copyrighted from 1997, despite being released in 1998. It was meant to come out on November 18, 1997, but was pushed back.

== Track listing ==
All tracks written by Scooter Ward.

No.	Title	Length
1.	"Go Away"	4:41
2.	"Give"	3:48
3.	"Ugly"	4:14
4.	"Everyone Dies"	3:19
5.	"Strip Her Down"	6:13
6.	"Insane"	5:41
7.	"Goodbye Cruel World"	3:28
8.	"Serial Killer"	5:35
9.	"Superstar"	4:17
10.	"The Switch"	4:07
11.	"Makes Her Sick"	3:59

Japanese edition
No.	Title	Length
12.	"Blame" (feat. Fred Durst)	4:21

== Release and reception ==
AllMusic gave the album four out of five stars stating "Cold's songwriting isn't always great and they're too concerned with adolescent angst and horror ('Everyone Dies,' 'Insane,' 'Serial Killer,' etc.), but the band's sound is fully formed, resulting in a strong debut." Although the album didn't have excellent sales and lacked heavy promotion, it was ranked the eighth-best album of 1998 by Kerrang! magazine.

A music video was shot for "Give" in 1998, featuring cameos by both Jonathan Davis of Korn and director Fred Durst of Limp Bizkit.

== Personnel ==
Cold

- Scooter Ward – vocals, guitar, percussion, piano
- Kelly Hayes – guitars, backing vocals
- Jeremy Marshall – bass, backing vocals
- Sam McCandless – drums, backing vocals

Additional musicians

- Ross Robinson – additional vocals
- Chuck Johnson – additional percussion
- Krystal Atkins – female vocal on "Strip Her Down"
- Fred Durst – additional vocals on "Blame" and "Go Away"

Production and management

- Production and recording: Ross Robinson
- Executive producer: Jordan Schur
- A&R for Flip: Fred Durst
- A&R for A&M: Larry Weintraub
- Mixed by Terry Date: All tracks except "Ugly" and "Strip Her Down"
- Mixed by Ross Robinson: "Ugly" and "Strip Her Down"
- Engineered by: Richard Kaplan
- Assisted by: Chuck Johnson and Rob Agnello
- Mastered by: Howie Weinberg

Artwork

- Art direction: John Otto and Cold
- Photography: Matthew Barnes
- Paintings: Sam McCandless
