= Duncan U. Fletcher High School =

Location
- 700 Seagate Avenue; Neptune Beach, Florida 32266; United States; 30°18′28″N 81°24′05″W

Information
- Type: Public high school
- Motto: Pride of The Beaches
- Established: 20 September 1937; 89 years ago
- School district: Duval County Public Schools
- Superintendent: Diana L. Greene
- CEEB code: 109305
- NCES School ID: 120048000748
- Principal: James Ledford
- Teaching staff: 92.00 (on an FTE basis)
- Grades: 9–12
- Enrollment: 2,192 (2023-2024)
- Student to teacher ratio: 23.83
- Campus size: 20.5 acres (8.3 ha)
- Campus type: Urban
- Colors: Purple and white
- Nickname: Senators
- Website: dcps.duvalschools.org/o/dfhs

Duncan U. Fletcher High School, commonly referred to as Fletcher High, is a comprehensive public high school in Neptune Beach, Florida, United States. The school is one of 47 high schools in the Duval County School District. Like all Duval County schools, it is accredited through the Southern Association of Colleges and Schools.

As of 2019, Fletcher High offered its 2,146 students 20 Advanced Placement courses, several varsity sports and the Advanced International Certificate of Education (AICE) program. As part of the Department of Education's full-service community schools (FSCS) program, the school also hosts the Beaches Resource Center, which provides mental health services to the Jacksonville Beaches area.

Student academic and athletic teams, including mock trial, have represented the school at state and national competitions. Fletcher's mock trial team has competed in the National High School Mock Trial Championship (NHSMTC) after placing first in the state-level competition three times.

== History ==
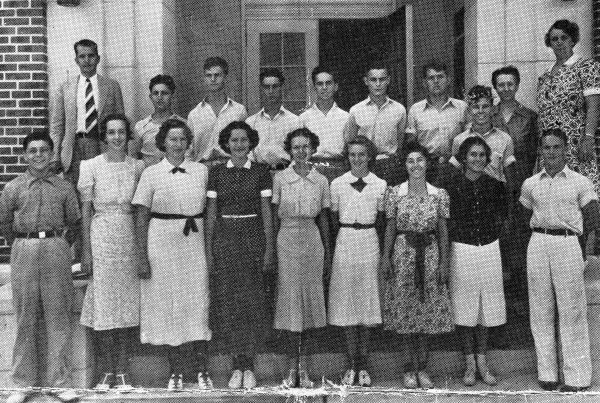
Fletcher High's first graduating class, 1938.

=== Founding and split ===
Former Jacksonville Mayor and United States Senator Duncan U. Fletcher obtained a federal grant to build the school which bears his name. It opened September 20, 1937 for grades seven through twelve. The school's mascot, the Senators, is also derived from their namesake. The original building was located in Jacksonville Beach and contained 10 classrooms. Frank Doggett, the first principal, oversaw a body of 269 students from the Jacksonville Beaches area with the help of 13 teachers.

In 1964, the school was racially integrated and split into two schools; Duncan U. Fletcher Junior High, now Duncan U. Fletcher Middle School, kept grades seven through eight in the original building while a new campus was built for Duncan U. Fletcher Senior High School down the street which kept grades nine through twelve. The 1969-70 freshman class was the last ninth grade class to attend the Senior High for over 20 years, as, beginning in the 1969-70 school year, ninth grade was moved to Fletcher Junior High.

=== Recent history ===
In 1991, the 9th grade was moved back from junior high schools to senior high schools, county-wide. Sixth grade was moved from elementary schools to junior high schools, which were renamed "middle schools." In 1997, Fletcher High became a full service school with the construction of the Beaches Resource Center on campus. The center provides mental health services to the Jacksonville Beaches community, including counseling, behavioral therapy and substance abuse treatment.

In 2007, Fletcher High tied with Lee High School (now Riverside High School) as the most crowded in Duval County. The high school obtained a new science lab in 2008, a critical addition after a 2007 protest by parents about the high school's inadequate science facilities for its 2600 students. Later in 2008, a new master plan for the school proposed the construction of a new wing to replace the school's 21 portable classrooms. As of 2019, this plan has yet to be implemented.

== Academics ==
=== Enrollment ===
As of the 2018-19 school year, Fletcher High had an enrollment of 2,146 and 92 classroom teachers (on an FTE basis), for a student-teacher ratio of 23.33; this ratio is higher than the district-wide ratio of 18.43. Of those 2,146 students, 26 percent (559) of them were eligible for free or reduced lunch under the National School Lunch Act. The school is primarily White, but with substantial Black and Hispanic or Latino minorities.

=== Performance ===
In 2019, the school received an "A" on the Florida Department of Education's School Accountability Grading Scale. Fletcher High offers the Advanced International Certificate of Education (AICE) program along with 20 Advanced Placement courses, including AP United States History, AP Psychology, AP United States Government and Politics and AP Statistics. 72 percent of students take an Advanced Placement course. Dual enrollment courses are also offered through Florida State College at Jacksonville

== Extracurriculars ==
=== Athletics ===
Fletcher High offers several varsity sports for each gender, including boys' football, basketball, baseball, lacrosse, soccer, swimming, tennis, track and wrestling alongside girls' basketball, cross country, flag football, lacrosse, soccer, softball, track and volleyball. The school also has a coeducational golf team. Like all other Duval County schools, Fletcher High competes in the Florida High School Athletic Association (FHSAA). The boys swim team frequently travels to the FHSAA State Championships, where in 2018 they placed 8th in class 4A. In 2017, the boys varsity lacrosse team became first in the county to win a district championship, allowing them to go to state playoffs.

=== Student clubs ===
Fletcher High's Interact club was founded in coordination with the local Rotary International chapter, and is one of 35,000 member clubs worldwide. The Interact Club is the largest club at the school, with 135 members as of December 2019. The school also hosts a local Key Club, which provides leadership development through local service.

The school also hosts the Marine Coastal Club, which has been running beach cleanups in Neptune Beach and Jacksonville Beach since 2010. In 2018, the club collaborated with the Public Trust Environmental Legal Institute of Florida to found Duval Dunes, a project to conserve the local dunes and the population of sea oats which help protect them.

The school's mock trial team, founded by teacher Edward Lange in 1991, has represented the school in the National High School Mock Trial Championship (NHSMTC) after winning the state-level competition three times. In 1997, Fletcher High won the state championships, qualifying them to travel for Nashville, Tennessee for the national competition. In 2012, they also participated in Empire Mock Trial World Championships in New York City, where they placed tenth. Later in 2014 and 2016, the team went to nationals again, where they placed 11th and 27th, respectively.

The school also hosts many other clubs including Chess, Model United Nations, Jewish Student Union, Speech and Debate, Brain Brawl, Speak Up, Dungeons & Dragons, WPC Photography Club, etc.

== Notable alumni ==
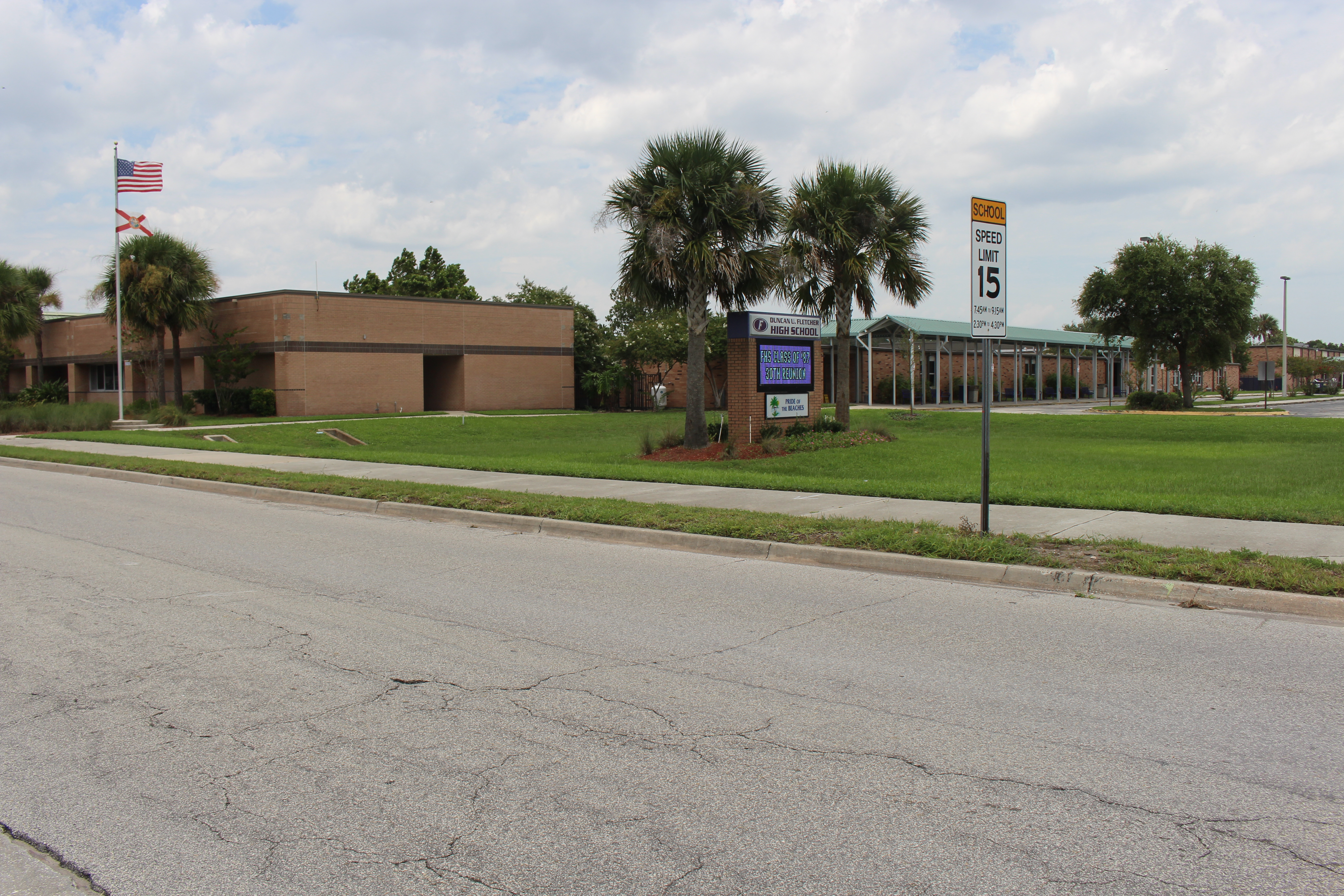
Fletcher's campus, 2017

- Khalid Abdullah – former NFL and CFL linebacker for the Cincinnati Bengals, Calgary Stampeders and Montreal Alouettes
- Rahim Abdullah – former NFL and CFL linebacker for the Cleveland Browns, Edmonton Eskimos and Calgary Stampeders
- Ephesians Bartley – former NFL linebacker for the Philadelphia Eagles
- Jo Ann Campbell - pop singer and recording artist
- Carey Cavanaugh – former United States Ambassador
- Andre Cooper – former NFL wide receiver for the Denver Broncos
- Ciatrick Fason – former NFL running back for the Minnesota Vikings
- Noah Jackson – former NFL and CFL offensive lineman for the Chicago Bears, Tampa Bay Buccaneers and Toronto Argonauts
- Kris Keller, former MLB pitcher for the Detroit Tigers
- Matt Loughran, Jeremy Marshall, Sam McCandless and Scooter Ward – founding members of the band Cold
- Sean Mattison – professional surfer, 2003 United States Surfing Champion
- Myles Montgomery – NFL running back for the New England Patriots
- Michael D. Reynolds – astronomy professor and teacher; 1986 Florida Teacher of The Year, Teacher in Space Project finalist and namesake of 298877 Michaelreynolds
- David Sharpe – NFL offensive tackle for the Carolina Panthers
- Tom Sullivan – former NFL running back for the Philadelphia Eagles and Cleveland Browns
- Allison Tant, politician
- Whitney Thompson – America's Next Top Model winner, cycle 10
- Scooter Ward - founding member and lead singer of the rock band Cold
- Malachi Witherspoon – MLB pitcher for the Detroit Tigers
- Kyson Witherspoon – MLB pitcher for the Boston Red Sox
- Lajae Jones – NBA forward for the Golden State Warriors
