= San Pablo Island =

Barrier island in Florida, United States

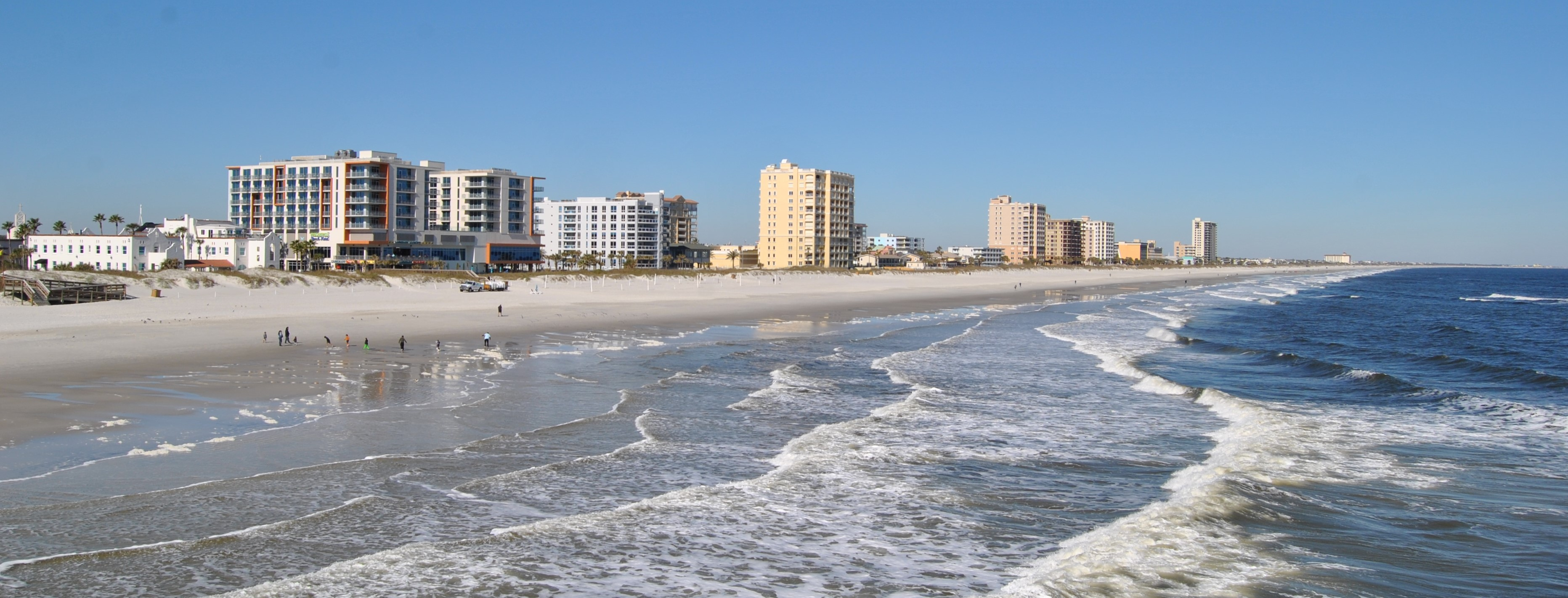
- Coastline of Jacksonville Beach on San Pablo Island.

- San Pablo Island San Pablo Island (North Atlantic)

Geography
- Location: North Atlantic
- Coordinates: 30.2841°N 81.3961°W

Administration
- United States
- State: Florida
- Counties: Duval; St. Johns

Demographics
- Population: 82,254 (2020)

San Pablo Island is an unofficial name of a barrier island located off the northeast Atlantic coast of Florida in the United States. It composes the Jacksonville Beaches sitting on the eastern edge of the Jacksonville metropolitan area. The island is about 34 miles (55 km) long. It is separated from the mainland by the Intracoastal waterway to the west, the St. Johns River to the north, and St. Augustine Inlet to the south.

The island's name has been recognized by the city-county consolidated government of Jacksonville and by the municipal government of Atlantic Beach. Multiple other names had been proposed, including Pablo Island, San Diego Island, Diego Island. The goal of uniting a 30-plus mile stretch with its seven communities, some unincorporated, under one name is to provide better opportunities for tourism business.

The northern half of the island is in Duval County, and consists of the cities of Atlantic Beach, Neptune Beach, Jacksonville Beach, as well as a portion of Jacksonville, including Mayport village. The southern half of the island is in St. Johns County, and includes the communities of Ponte Vedra Beach, Sawgrass and Vilano Beach

Naval Station Mayport is at the northern tip of the island, and the mouth of the St. Johns River.

== History ==
San Pablo Island has a rich history influenced by various cultural and economic developments. Originally inhabited by Native American tribes like the Timucua, the area saw increased activity in the 19th century as Jacksonville emerged as a key port, and rapid development in the mid-to-late 20th century.

In the 1940s, the U.S. Army Corps of Engineers constructed the Intracoastal Waterway, which connected the San Pablo River to the Matanzas River, completely separating San Pablo from mainland Florida. This development bolstered local shipping, tying the coastal area closer to the Jacksonville economy and leading to suburban growth in the mid-20th century.

Today, San Pablo Island is primarily residential, known for its natural beauty and recreational opportunities like boating, hiking, and golf, contributing to the overall charm of the Jacksonville area.

== Transportation ==
Growth on north San Pablo Island was facilitated by roads and bridges built over time to connect it with Jacksonville on the mainland, beginning with Atlantic Blvd in the early 1900s, Beach Blvd (which was constructed on the railway bed of the former Jacksonville and Atlantic Railroad) in the late 1940s, the Butler Blvd expressway in the late 1980s, and finally, the Wonderwood Connector completed in the mid 2000s. The St. Johns River Ferry carries A1A across the St. Johns river near the northern tip of the island.

Six bridges link San Pablo Island to the rest of the Jacksonville metropolitan area, four in Duval County, and two in St. Johns County.

== Towns and Cities ==
=== Duval County ===
(3 cities, 1 unincorporated town, 1 naval station)

- Atlantic Beach
- Jacksonville Beach
- Mayport
- Mayport Naval Station
- Neptune Beach

=== St. Johns County ===
(All are unincorporated census-designated places)

- Ponte Vedra Beach
- Sawgrass
- Vilano Beach

== See also ==
- Jacksonville Beaches
- Anastasia Island

== Sources ==
- McGuinness, N. (2010). The Beaches: A History and Tour. McGuinness Financial Corporation. ISBN 978-0-615-38519-8.
