= Community school (United States) =

Publicly funded school in the United States

The term community school refers to a type of publicly funded school in the United States that serves as both an educational institution and a center of community life. A community school is both a physical place and a network of partnerships linking the school with community resources. Its integrated focus on academics, youth development, family support, health and social services, and community development leads to improved student learning, stronger families, and healthier communities. By using public schools as hubs, community schools unite multiple partners to provide a wide range of supports and opportunities for children, youth, families, and communities—before, during, and after school, as well as on weekends.

According to the Coalition for Community Schools, a branch of the Institute for Educational Leadership, a community school is "both a place and a set of partnerships between the school and other community resources" with an integrated focus on academics, health and social services, leadership, and community engagement. Community schools are generally public—that is, government- and taxpayer-funded—although many private and charter schools have also adopted the model. One challenge the movement has faced is the wide diversity of institutions that identify as community schools. This diversity, combined with the decentralized structure of American education, has made it difficult to accurately quantify the number of community schools currently operating nationwide.

The movement gained momentum in the Chicago area, where the Federation for Community Schools is working to disseminate the model throughout the public-school infrastructure. With the appointment of Arne Duncan, former CEO of Chicago Public Schools, to the post of Secretary of Education, by President Obama, the concept of "schools as centers of community life" became a part of the national education agenda during Obama's tenure. Currently, many local, state, and national organizations seek the establishment of community schools throughout the country. Of these the most prominent non-profits are the Coalition for Community Schools, Communities In Schools, Schools of the 21st Century (an initiative of Yale University), the National Community Education Association (NCEA), and the Children's Aid Society. The United States government (through the 21st Century Community Learning Center) and various state governments also provide funding and policy support for community school initiatives.

== Characteristics ==
The American Federation of Teachers defines a community school as one that has:

- community partners, which can include nonprofit organizations, unions, businesses, public agencies, local government, faith-based organizations, philanthropic organizations, post-secondary education institutions, hospitals, and other community organizations
- a site coordinator to recruit community partners and facilitate communication.
- an advisory team including "the principal, teachers and school staff, school health and mental health professionals, parents, students, and community partners"
- support programs that extend beyond the bounds of traditional education. Examples include substance abuse prevention, GED services, housing assistance, and insurance enrollment assistance
- programming outside of school hours, with content connected to the curriculum
- close communication between parents and educators
- a culture of trust, transparency, belonging, and values-based learning
- a focus on student health

== Research ==
Several leading universities have established centers to investigate the community-school-family triad. A key focus of the Harvard Family Research Project is "linking families, schools, and communities to support success in school and in life." The Institute for Education and Social Policy at New York University also studies the relationship between these three tributaries to student learning. Fordham University's National Center for Schools and Communities has a slightly narrower focus, emphasizing quality education for minority and low-income students. At Johns Hopkins University, the Center on School, Family, and Community Partnerships augments academic research with guides to best practices and workshop resources for parents, educators, and activists.

Scholarship has made explicit the precise effects of such partnerships on everything from drop-out rates to standardized test results. For example, a 2003 study of 82 Maryland elementary schools found, after controlling for external variables, that "the degree to which schools were working to overcome challenges to family and community involvement predicted higher percentages of students scoring at or above satisfactory on state achievement tests." Joyce Epstein, the director of the Center on Schools, Family, and Community Partnerships is a lead researcher in the field. In a 2005 article for The Journal of Educational Research, she and colleague Steven Sheldon not only established the link, via data collection and analysis, between school-family-community partnerships and improved student attendance, they also laid out several activities to reduce chronic absenteeism. The establishment of channels of communication between schools and parents, workshops for parents, and after-school programs for students are among the best practices utilized by the community school model of education.

In 2020 Mavis G. Sanders and Claudia L. Galindo published an impact review volume, Reviewing the Success of Full-Service Community Schools in the US.

== Policy ==
The Full Service Community Schools (FSCS) Grant Program, part of an amendment to the Elementary and Secondary Education Act of 1965, offers grants from the Department of Education intended to fund the establishment, or expansion, of one or more community schools. Grants will be awarded annually and are estimated to range between $275,000 – 500,000 per annum. Applicants must be part of a consortium that consists of a local educational agency and one or more community-based organizations, non-profit organizations, or other public or private entities.

== See also ==
- Full-service community schools in the United States
- Education in the United States
