= Neptune Beach, Florida =

- City
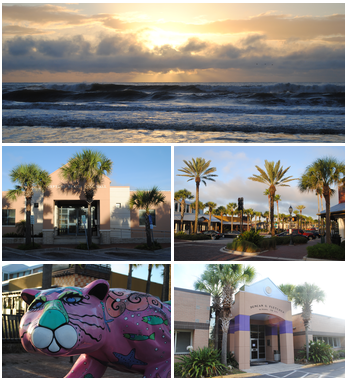
- Images from top, left to right: Sunrise at the beach, City Hall, Beaches Town Center, jaguar statue in the Beaches Town Center, Duncan U. Fletcher High School

- Seal Logo

- Location of Neptune Beach, Florida
- Coordinates: 30°18′58″N 81°22′55″W
- Country: United States
- State: Florida
- County: Duval
- Incorporated: August 11, 1931

Government
  - Type: Council–Manager

Area
  - City: 6.850 sq mi (17.741 km^{2})
  - Land: 2.337 sq mi (6.052 km^{2})
  - Water: 4.513 sq mi (11.688 km^{2})
- Elevation: 0 ft (0 m)

Population (2020)
  - City: 7,217
  - Estimate (2023): 6,984
  - Density: 2,988.9/sq mi (1,154.01/km^{2})
  - Urban: 1,247,374
  - Metro: 1,713,240
- Time zone: UTC−5 (Eastern (EST))
  - Summer (DST): UTC−4 (EDT)
- ZIP Code: 32266
- Area codes: 904 and 324
- FIPS code: 12-48100
- GNIS feature ID: 2404355
- Website: nbfl.gov

Neptune Beach is a beachfront city east of Jacksonville in Duval County, Florida, United States. When the majority of Duval County communities consolidated with Jacksonville in 1968, Neptune Beach, along with Jacksonville Beach, Atlantic Beach and Baldwin remained quasi-independent. Like those other municipalities, it maintains its own municipal government but its residents vote in the Jacksonville mayoral election and are represented on the Jacksonville city council. The population was 7,217 at the 2020 census. Neptune Beach is the smallest of the Jacksonville Beaches communities. it is part of the Jacksonville, Florida Metropolitan Statistical Area.

== History ==
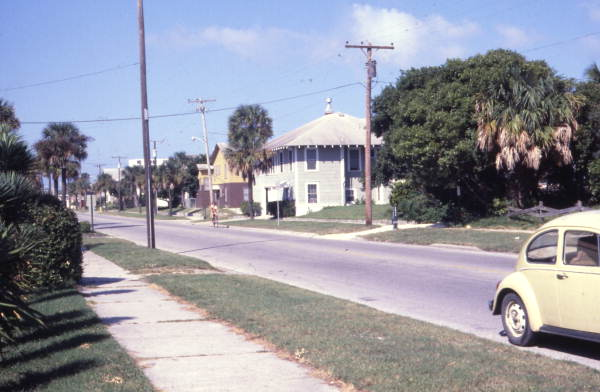
Looking north along 1st St. at Neptune Beach in 1979

Neptune Beach was originally part of Jacksonville Beach. Through its development, the part of Jacksonville Beach north of 20th Avenue North was sparsely populated, with a brick road (First Street) connecting the more populated southern area with Atlantic Beach. The name "Neptune Beach" originated in 1922 with Dan G. Wheeler, one of the few residents. Wheeler had a home at what is now One Ocean Hotel (now in Atlantic Beach), and had to walk all the way home from Mayport each evening after taking the Florida East Coast Railway train home from work in Jacksonville. A friend who worked for the railroad informed Wheeler that if he had a station, the train would have to stop for him, so Wheeler built his own train station near his home and named it Neptune.

Neptune seceded from Jacksonville Beach and incorporated as its own municipality in 1931, following a tax revolt. The comparatively few residents of the area were largely cut off from Jacksonville Beach city services such as police, fire, garbage collection, and road developments, though they paid taxes in equal share. The first mayor was O. O. McCollum, and the government met in Wheeler's old train station until a new town hall was completed in 1935.

== Geography ==
According to the United States Census Bureau, the city has a total area of 6.850 square miles (17.74 km^{2}), of which, 2.337 square miles (6.05 km^{2}) is land and 4.513 square miles (11.69 km^{2}) (65.96%) is water.

Neptune Beach is one of several towns on San Pablo Island, which stretches through two counties (Duval and St. Johns) and extends from Naval Station Mayport at its northern tip to Vilano Beach in the south, across from St. Augustine.

== Transportation ==
=== Major highways ===
- SR A1A
- SR 10

== Demographics ==
Historical population
Census	Pop.	Note	%±
1940	1,363		—
1950	1,767		29.6%
1960	2,868		62.3%
1970	4,281		49.3%
1980	5,248		22.6%
1990	6,816		29.9%
2000	7,270		6.7%
2010	7,037		−3.2%
2020	7,217		2.6%
2023 (est.)	6,984	▼	−3.2%
U.S. Decennial Census; 2020 Census

As of the 2022 American Community Survey, there are 3,020 estimated households in Neptune Beach with an average of 2.23 persons per household. The city has a median household income of $109,375. Approximately 2.2% of the city's population lives at or below the poverty line. Neptune Beach has an estimated 73.8% employment rate, with 59.6% of the population holding a bachelor's degree or higher and 97.0% holding a high school diploma.

The top five reported ancestries (people were allowed to report up to two ancestries, thus the figures will generally add to more than 100%) were English (94.2%), Spanish (5.0%), Indo-European (0.5%), Asian and Pacific Islander (0.0%), and Other (0.4%).

=== Racial and ethnic composition ===
Neptune Beach, Florida – racial and ethnic composition Note: the US Census treats Hispanic/Latino as an ethnic category. This table excludes Latinos from the racial categories and assigns them to a separate category. Hispanics/Latinos may be of any race.
Race / ethnicity (NH = non-Hispanic)	Pop. 2000	Pop. 2010	Pop. 2020	% 2000	% 2010	% 2020
White alone (NH)	6,878	6,464	6,302	94.61%	91.86%	87.32%
Black or African American alone (NH)	53	84	73	0.73%	1.19%	1.01%
Native American or Alaska Native alone (NH)	27	23	19	0.37%	0.33%	0.26%
Asian alone (NH)	75	58	85	1.03%	0.82%	1.18%
Pacific Islander alone (NH)	4	1	7	0.06%	0.01%	0.10%
Other race alone (NH)	3	14	29	0.04%	0.20%	0.40%
Mixed-race or multiracial (NH)	78	115	320	1.07%	1.63%	4.43%
Hispanic or Latino (any race)	152	278	382	2.09%	3.95%	5.29%
Total	7,270	7,037	7,217	100.00%	100.00%	100.00%

=== 2020 census ===
As of the 2020 census, there were 7,217 people, 3,237 households, and 1,973 families residing in the city. The median age was 43.0 years. 17.2% of residents were under the age of 18 and 18.7% were 65 years of age or older. For every 100 females there were 97.7 males, and for every 100 females age 18 and over there were 94.9 males age 18 and over.

100.0% of residents lived in urban areas, while 0.0% lived in rural areas.

Of households in Neptune Beach, 24.9% had children under the age of 18 living in them. Of all households, 48.2% were married-couple households, 19.8% were households with a male householder and no spouse or partner present, and 25.8% were households with a female householder and no spouse or partner present. About 28.2% of all households were made up of individuals, and 9.5% had someone living alone who was 65 years of age or older.

There were 3,500 housing units, of which 7.5% were vacant. The homeowner vacancy rate was 1.0% and the rental vacancy rate was 5.8%. The population density was 3,088.1 inhabitants per square mile (1,192.3/km^{2}), and there were 1,497.6 per square mile (578.2/km^{2}) housing units per square mile.

=== 2010 census ===
As of the 2010 census, there were 7,037 people, 3,192 households, and 1,771 families residing in the city. The population density was 3,017.6 inhabitants per square mile (1,165.1/km^{2}). There were 3,493 housing units at an average density of 1,497.9 per square mile (578.3/km^{2}). The racial makeup of the city was 94.59% White, 1.21% African American, 0.36% Native American, 0.97% Asian, 0.03% Pacific Islander, 0.78% from some other races and 2.07% from two or more races. Hispanic or Latino people of any race were 3.95% of the population.

=== 2000 census ===
As of the 2000 census, there were 7,270 people, 3,282 households, and 1,857 families residing in the city. The population density was 2,968.8 inhabitants per square mile (1,146.3/km^{2}). There were 3,472 housing units at an average density of 1,417.9 per square mile (547.5/km^{2}). The racial makeup of the city was 96.08% White, 0.73% African American, 0.40% Native American, 1.03% Asian, 0.06% Pacific Islander, 0.52% from some other races and 1.18% from two or more races. Hispanic or Latino people of any race were 2.09% of the population.

In 2000, there were 3,282 households, out of which 24.2% had children under the age of 18 living with them, 44.9% were married couples living together, 8.2% had a female householder with no husband present, and 43.4% were non-families. 31.3% of all households were made up of individuals, and 7.7% had someone living alone who was 65 years of age or older. The average household size was 2.22 and the average family size was 2.85.

In 2000, in the city, the population was spread out, with 19.3% under the age of 18, 8.4% from 18 to 24, 33.3% from 25 to 44, 26.9% from 45 to 64, and 12.1% who were 65 years of age or older. The median age was 39 years. For every 100 females, there were 103.8 males. For every 100 females age 18 and over, there were 99.7 males.

In 2000, the median income for a household in the city was $53,576, and the median income for a family was $65,684. Males had a median income of $43,431 versus $30,264 for females. The per capita income for the city was $30,525. About 1.9% of families and 2.5% of the population were below the poverty line, including 1.8% of those under age 18 and 2.9% of those age 65 or over.

== Education ==
Duval County Public Schools operates public schools. Schools in Neptune Beach include:

- Neptune Beach Elementary School
- Duncan U. Fletcher Middle School
- Duncan U. Fletcher High School

Jacksonville Public Library operates the Beaches Branch in Neptune Beach.

== Gallery ==
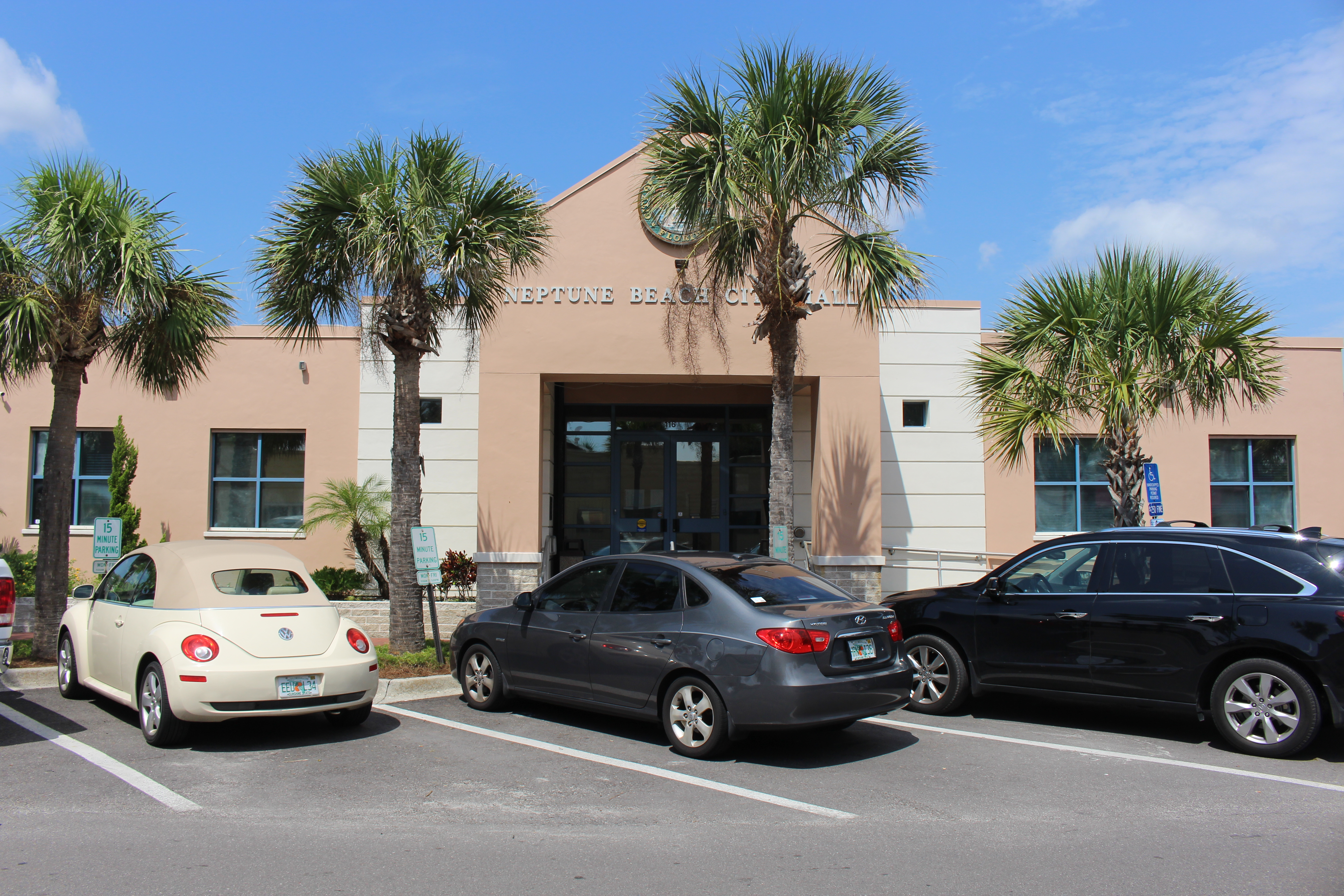
Neptune Beach City Hall

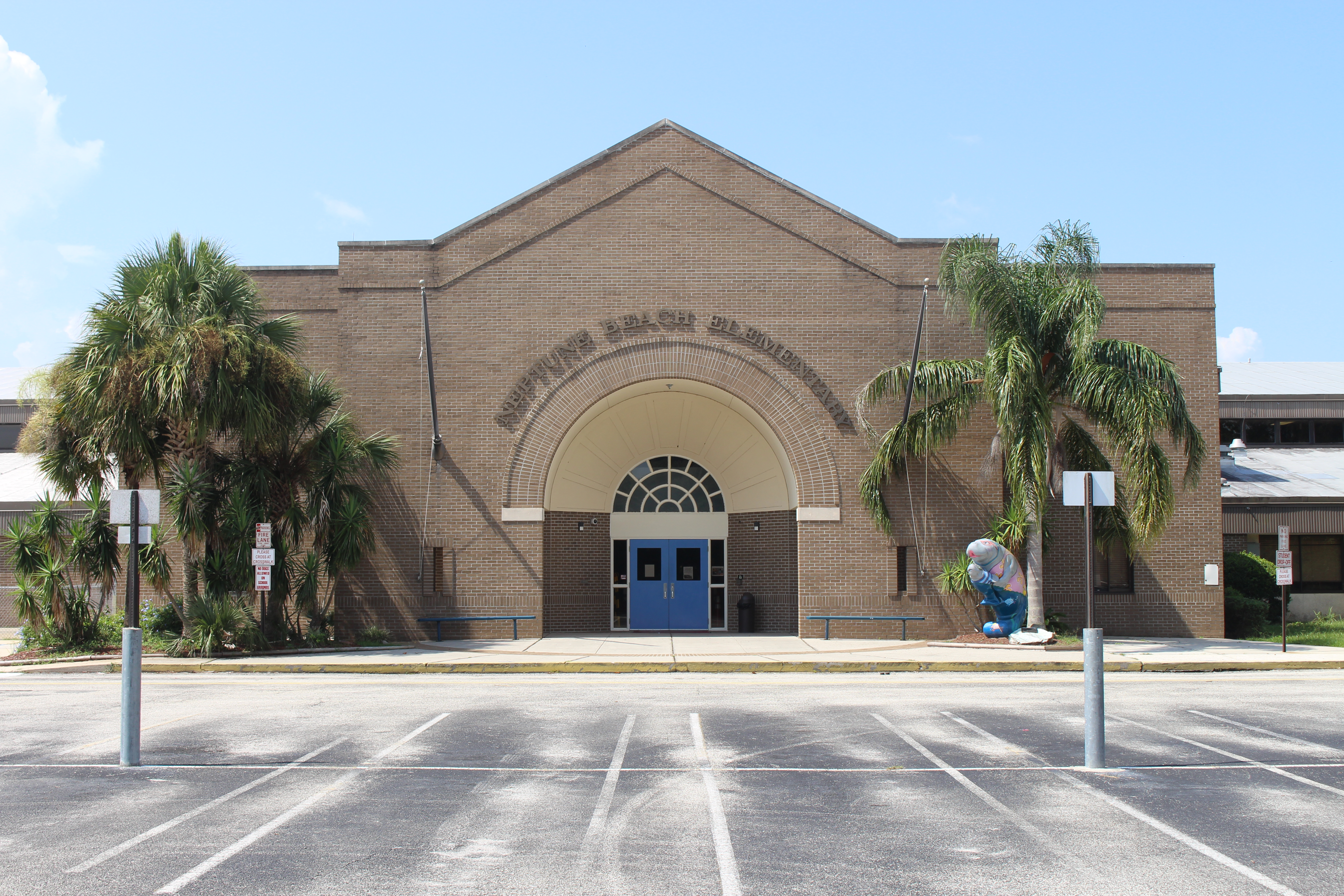
Neptune Beach Elementary School

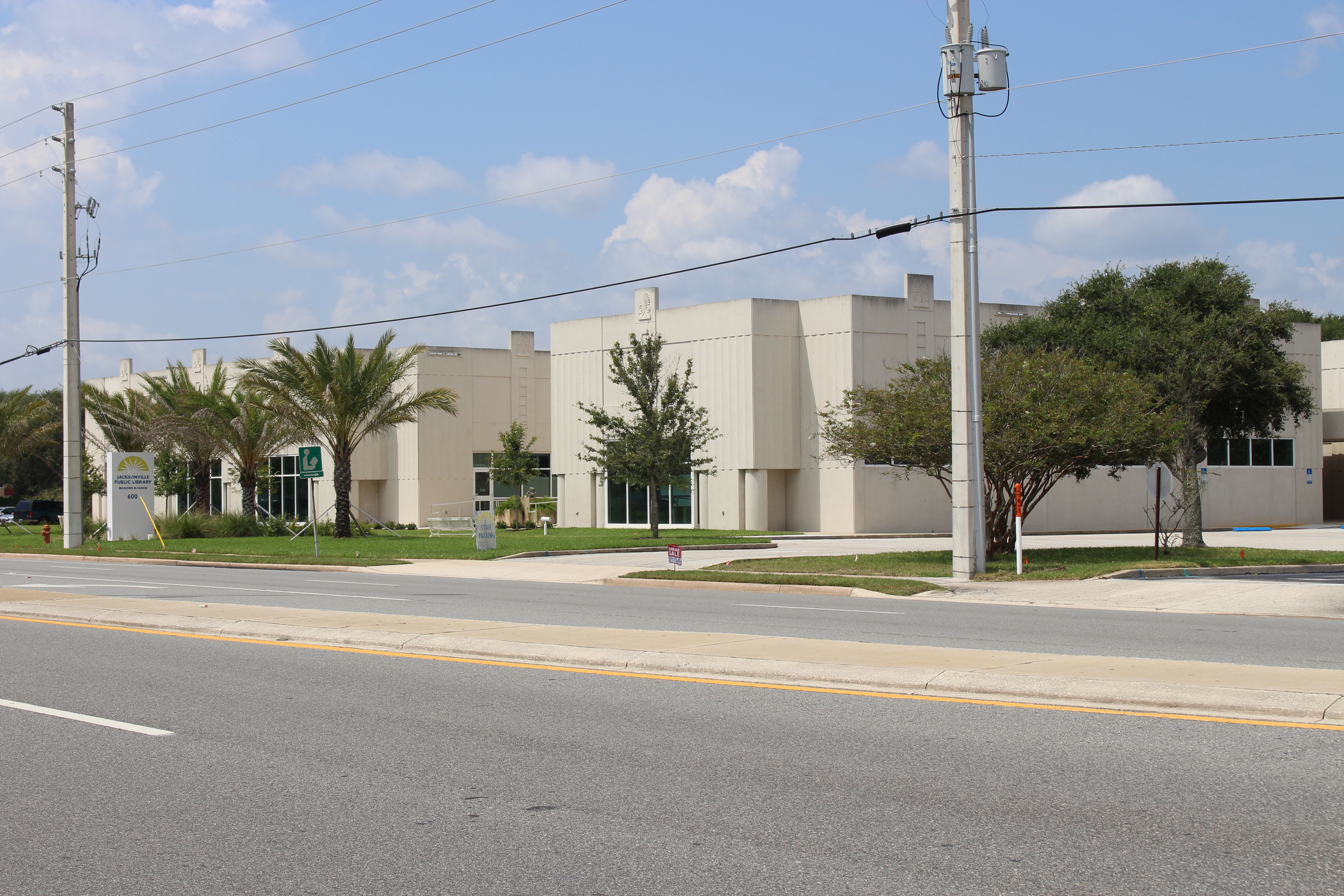
Beaches Branch Library, Jacksonville Public Library

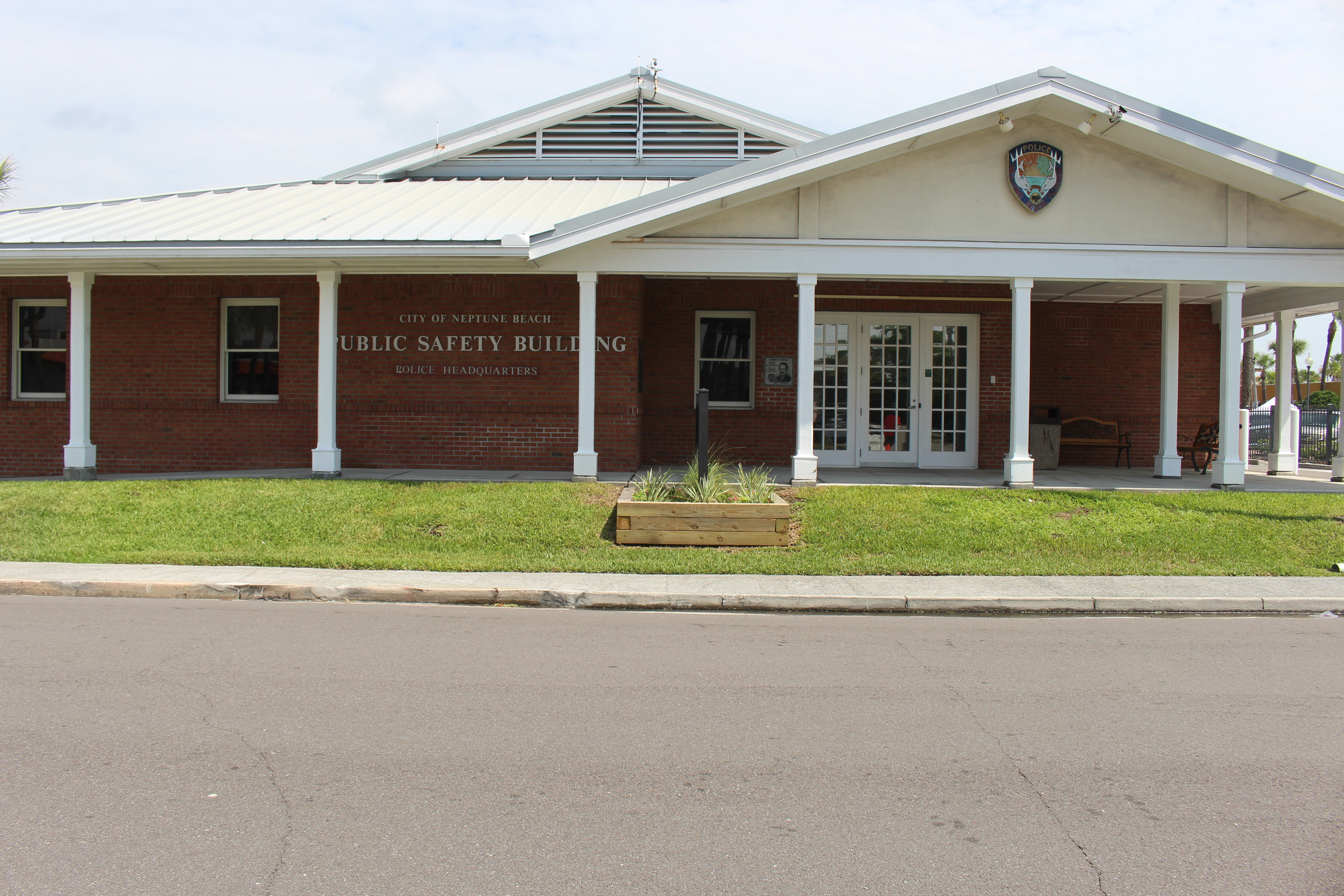
Public safety building (police headquarters)

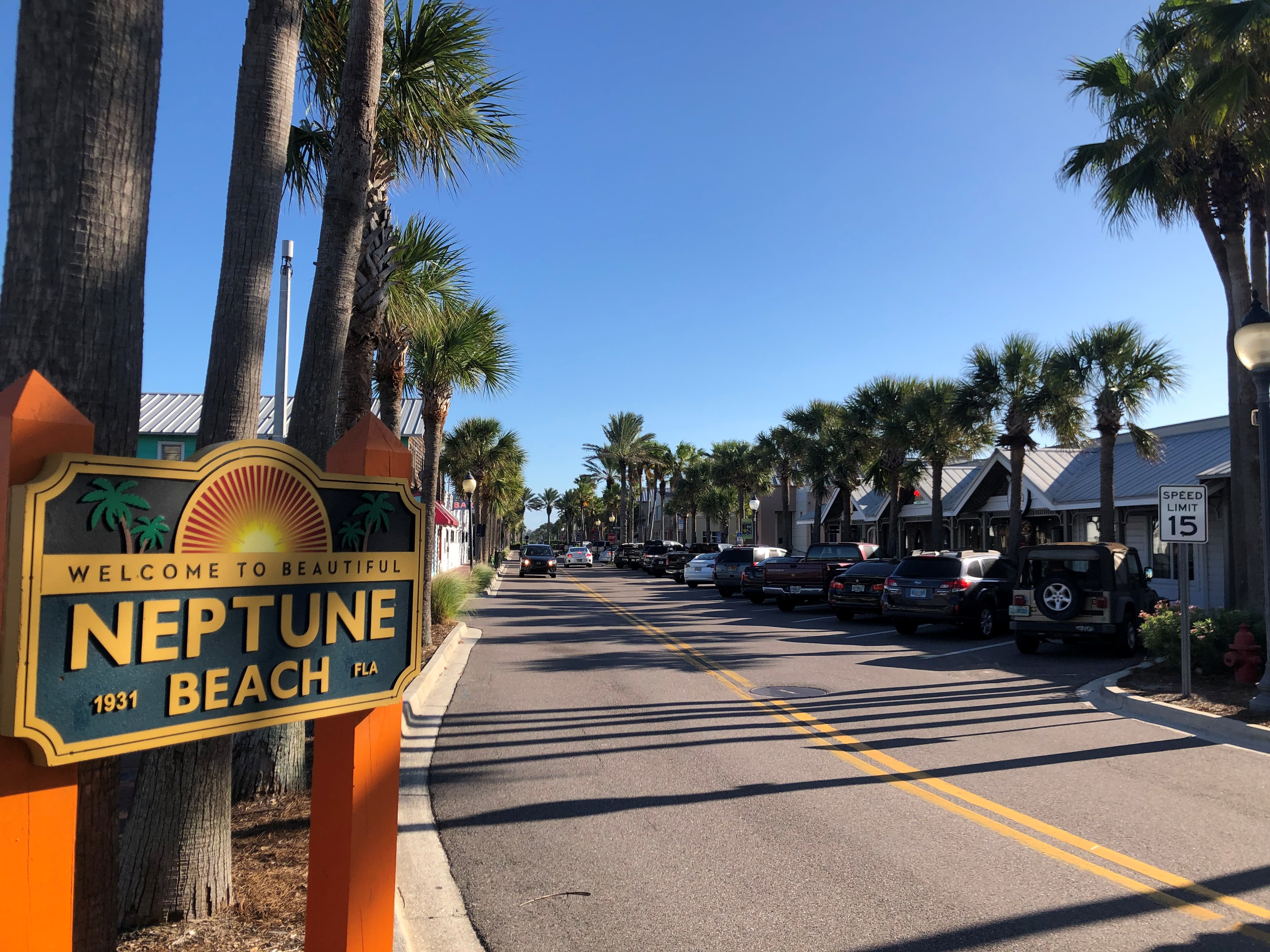
Beaches Town Center entrance at Neptune Beach boundary

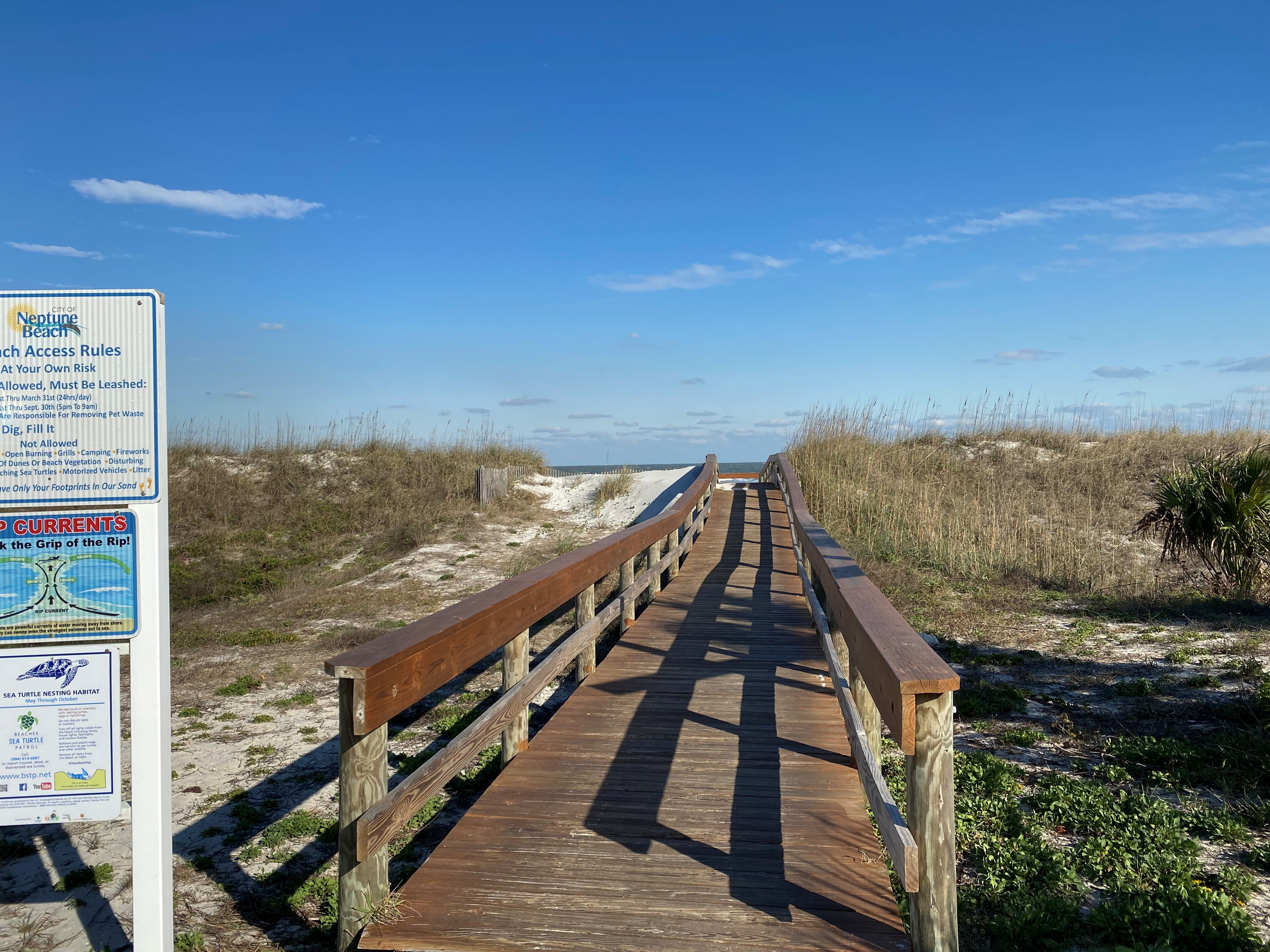
Typical dune crossover at beach accesses in Neptune Beach

== See also ==
- Jacksonville Beaches
- Greater Jacksonville
- National Register of Historic Places listings in Duval County, Florida
