= Ephesians Bartley =

American football player (born 1969)

No. 50, 5
- Position: Linebacker

Personal information
- Born: August 9, 1969 (age 57); Jacksonville, Florida, U.S.
- Listed height: 6 ft 2 in (1.88 m)
- Listed weight: 213 lb (97 kg)

Career information
- High school: Duncan U. Fletcher (Neptune Beach, Florida)
- College: Florida (1988–1991)
- NFL draft: 1992: 9th round, 241st overall pick

Career history
- Philadelphia Eagles (1992); Calgary Stampeders (1993)*; San Antonio Texans (1995); Toronto Argonauts (1995)
- * Offseason or practice squad member only

Awards and highlights
- First-team All-SEC (1991)
- Stats at Pro Football Reference

Ephesians Alexander "Fee" Bartley Jr. (born August 9, 1969) is an American former professional football linebacker who played one season with the Philadelphia Eagles of the National Football League (NFL). He was selected by the Eagles in the ninth round of the 1992 NFL draft after played college football at the University of Florida. Bartley also played for the San Antonio Texans of the Canadian Football League (CFL).

== Early life ==
Ephesians Alexander Bartley Jr. was born on August 9, 1969, in Jacksonville, Florida. He played high school football at Duncan U. Fletcher High School in Neptune Beach, Florida. He was a center and linebacker in high school.

== College career ==
Bartley was a four-year letterman for the Florida Gators of the University of Florida from 1988 to 1991. He was a safety his first two seasons and a linebacker his final two seasons. He made his only career interception in 1989. He was a member of Florida's first-ever Southeastern Conference (SEC)-championship winning season in 1991 and earned Associated Press second-team All-SEC and Coaches first-team All-SEC honors.

== Professional career ==
Bartley was selected by the Philadelphia Eagles in the ninth round, with the 241st overall pick, of the 1992 NFL draft. He officially signed with the team on July 24. He was released by the Eagles on August 30 and signed to the team's practice squad the next day. Bartley was promoted to the active roster on November 18, 1992, and played in six games on special teams during the 1992 season. He also appeared in two playoff games that year. He was released by the Eagles on August 31, 1993.

Bartley was signed to the practice roster of the Calgary Stampeders of the Canadian Football League (CFL) in October 1993. On November 8, 1993, it was reported that he had been released by the Stampeders. He re-signed with the Stampeders in May 1994. Bartley was released in early July 1994 before the start of the 1994 CFL season.

Bartley signed with the San Antonio Texans of the Canadian Football League (CFL) in April 1995. He was placed on the injured list in late June 1995. On August 1, 1995, it was reported that he had been activated. He then played in three games for the Texans during the 1995 season.

On September 19, 1995, it was reported that Bartley had been traded to the Toronto Argonauts for a negotiation list player. He was projected to start for the Argonauts at weakside linebacker but reported to the team with a pulled hamstring four hours before kickoff. He was released on September 25, 1995, before appearing in a game.

== Personal life ==
Bartley worked at Holmes Lumber for a few years after his playing career before returning to the University of Florida and earning a master's in business. He later opened his own tax and business consulting firm called Bartley Management and Professional Services.
