= Viola B. Muse =

Viola B. Muse (born 1890) was an ethnographer and hairdresser who worked for the Negro Writers Unit of the Florida Federal Writers' Project in from 1936 to 1939. She interviewed African Americans on their experiences including in and around Tampa, Florida. Her subjects included prominent community leaders, former slaves, and described African American publications of the time, and did other ethnographic work in the Lavilla community of Jacksonville and African American sections of Tampa. Muse's interviews are included in the WPA Slave Narrative Collection.

There is inconsistency in records of Muse's birth year, with 1984 and 1989, listed in different official sources. She was born in Alabama. She married John P. Muse (died 1964). She worked as a hairdresser in the Lavilla community of Jacksonville.

The Federal Writers' Project in Florida was headed by Carita Doggett Corse. Her unit covering "Negros" in the Lavilla section of Jacksonville was headed by Zora Neal Hurston.

Muse interviewed former slaves, including two from Tallahassee (Willie Williams and Charles Coates), and field workers including one in Palatka, Florida. She also wrote about churches and education.

She interviewed a female daughter of a Cherokee / African American mother and slave owner father.

== Bibliography ==
- Ethnography, Tampa Florida, 16 pages
