= Joy G. Dryfoos =

American sociologist (1925–2012)

Joy G. Dryfoos (1925 – 28 March 2012) was an American sociologist who is credited with the creation of the concept of full-service schools.

== Early life and education ==
Dryfoos was born to Mr. and Mrs. Gidding in Plainfield, New Jersey, in 1925. She had one brother.

At 17, Dryfoos became a community organizer. She went to Pittsburgh, Pennsylvania, where she worked at the Irene Kaufman Settlement House. She also worked in a commune in North Dakota, and was the assistant director of an art studio in a Ypsilanti, Michigan, public housing project. In the early 1940s, Dryfoos began attending Antioch College, leaving in 1947, just a few credits short of graduating.

She then traveled around Europe until 1948. She then worked on Henry A. Wallace's presidential campaign. Afterward, she became involved in more community organizing. In 1951, she became the first Jewish president of the League of Women Voters. She left the position and became a substitute teacher, and returned to Antioch. She received a bachelor's degree in sociology in 1951.

When the 1960 census came out, she began analyzing it using her personal adding machine. She wrote a series of briefs based on census data, but did not intend for any specific audience to read them. However, her briefs came to the attention of Planned Parenthood, particularly one that focused on estimating the need family planning from Census data.

She then went to Sarah Lawrence College to pursue an advanced degree. She earned a master's degree in Urban Sociology in 1966.

== Career ==
After graduation, Dryfoos started a small consulting firm, Research, Writing and Editing Associates, before joining the Center for Family Planning Program Development, which is now the Alan Guttmacher Institute. She worked there for fifteen years, from 1969 to 1981, as the Director of Research and Planning. She was also involved in the 1975 publication Eleven Million Teenagers: The Epidemic of Teenage Pregnancy, a book that called attention to rampant teenage pregnancy in the United States. This phenomenon was largely unseen until said publication. She also co-founded the Coalition for Community Schools and the Full Service Schools Roundtable. Both were located in Boston, Massachusetts. In 1981, she left the center. She then went to work for The Rockefeller Foundation, where she wrote a paper on her ideas for teen pregnancy prevention. Around this time, she also became interested in school-based clinics, and continued to work on issues relating to teen pregnancy. She also became associated with The Carnegie Corporation. In 1985, she developed a proposal for a grant that became one of her books, Developing a Strategy for Adolescents at Risk. This proposal became the project Adolescents at Risk.

Dryfoos began to teach at Columbia University, where she became a full professor in the School of Public Health. She wrote more books, including Full Service Schools. She also began to work on various advisory committees, while an independent researcher at the Carnegie Corporation Foundation. She became a Senior Consultant to the Public Education Network's Schools and Community Initiative, and has also served on multiple National Academy of Sciences panels. She wrote hundreds of articles and multiple books.

== Personal life ==
She married George E. Dryfoos in 1949. The couple had one child.

== Death ==
Joy G. Dryfoos died on March 18, 2012, of cardiac arrest at her home in Brookline, Massachusetts, at the age of 86.

== Books ==
- (1990) Adolescents at Risk: Prevalence and Prevention
- (1994) Full-Service Schools: A Revolution in Health and Social Services for Children, Youth, and Families
- (1998) Safe Passage: Making it Through Adolescence in a Risky Society
- (2002) Inside Full-Service Community Schools
- (2006) Adolescence: Growing Up in America Today
