= Sean Mattison =

American surfer (born 1962)

Personal information
- Born: March 24, 1969 (age 57) Kalamazoo, Michigan, U.S.
- Years active: 1988-1995
- Height: 5 ft 9 in (175 cm)
- Weight: 185 lb (84 kg; 13.2 st)

Surfing career
- Sport: Surfing
- Best year: 1990 mid season rated #2 Bud Surf Tour, 1990 finished 7th Bud Surf Tour (PSAA)
- Major achievements: United States Surfing Champion 2003; Gold Medal as Assistant Coach: 2009 Team USA ISA World Champions; Gold Medal as Team USA Participant: 2011 Team USA Master's Division ISA World Champions

Surfing specifications
- Stance: Natural (regular) foot
- Favorite waves: Right hand pointbreaks
- Favorite maneuvers: Front side carves and hacks

Sean Mattison is an American former professional surfer and current professional surf coach, known mostly for designing "The Nubster", a fifth surfboard fin. Mattison is also the designer of his own alternative high performance surfboards and surfboard fins named Von-Sol.

In 2009, Mattison worked as Assistant Coach alongside Head Coach Ian Cairns to coach the USA Surf Team of the 2009 ISA World Championships. The team scored a gold medal, prior to which the USA had not won a Gold Medal since 1996.

== Athletic career ==
=== Early years ===
Mattison was born in Kalamazoo, Michigan, United States on 24 March 1969. Mattison moved to Atlantic Beach, Florida in 1973 and started surfing in 1974. By 1977, Mattison started competing in surf competitions in Jacksonville Beach, Florida when he was only 8 years old. Mattison grew up surfing on the east coast in the ESA (Eastern Surfing Association). In 1980, Mattison was a member of the ESA All-Stars with fellow professional surfer and 11x ASP World Champion Kelly Slater.

Mattison also placed fifth overall at the NSSA Nationals and was a member of the NSSA national team.

=== Professional achievements ===
- In 1988, Mattison established himself as an elite surfer and earned himself a spot in the top 30 ranked surfers in the (PSAA) Bud Surf Tour on his rookie year.
- Mattison had his best year in 1990, when he was rated #2 in the (PSAA)Bud Surf Tour mid-way through the season and finishing #7 in the (PSAA) Bud Surf Tour.
- Mattison won second place in the 1990 Body Glove Memorial Surf Classic.
- Mattison was on the cover of Surfer Magazine in 1993.
- Crowned 2003 United States Surfing Champion.
- Mattison was on a cover of a controversial Longboard Magazine in 2006 which had him surfing a "fish" rather than a longboard.
- Mattison won a gold medal with Team USA in the 2011 ISA World Championships in Punta Roca, El Salvador. Mattison was part of the USA Master's Team with former three time ASP world champion Tom Curren and fellow professional surfer Jim Hogan.
- Mattison is a member of the Jacksonville Surfing Hall of Fame.
- Mattison won the U.S. Open of Surfing Master's Division the same year that his wife won fourth in the women's.

== Brand and personal life ==
=== Retail surf industry ===
Sean Mattison was the General Manager and Chief Board Buyer for Surf Ride Inc. in Oceanside, California from 1997 through 2007. Mattison was featured in a Surfing Magazine article titled "Lord of the Boards". When Clark Foam, a surfboard foam manufacturer that supplied 90% of blank surfboards in the United States, closed its doors, Surfer Magazine ran its only cover in history to have just a surfboard on its cover. The cover featured the tagline "This Changes Everything", a quote created by Mattison.

=== Surfboard design ===
Mattison is the designer of his own surfboard label Von-Sol Surfboards. Mattison, having a former background in design, collaborated with Mike Hynson to make the "Black Knight Quad" a four fin surfboard that had much success in design. Mike Hynson is co-star of the hit 1966 surf movie "The Endless Summer" directed by Bruce Brown.

Another notable design of Mattison's was Kelly Slater's "nubster", a fifth fin that some critics have credited as helping Kelly Slater win his 11th ASP World Championship.

=== Personal life ===
In 1990, Mattison married, and in 1993 had his first child. Mattison and his wife are now parents of three children.

Mattison and his family were in an article for Coastal Living Magazine called Hang Ten Holidays.
