= Frank Doggett =

Frank Aristides Doggett (May 4, 1906 – September 9, 2002) was an educator in the Duval County, Florida school system and an independent scholar who was an early authority on the American Modernist poet, Wallace Stevens. Doggett was born in Jacksonville, Florida, earned a bachelor's degree at Rollins College in Winter Park, Florida and his master's degree at Emory University. He received an honorary doctorate of letters from the University of Florida in 1967 for his contributions toward the understanding of Stevens' work.

Doggett wrote numerous essays and two books on Stevens, Stevens' Poetry of Thought and Wallace Stevens, The Making of the Poem. He co-edited Wallace Stevens: A Celebration with Robert Buttel of Temple University.

== Biography ==
The son of a prominent Jacksonville attorney, Frank Doggett was the youngest of four children. A sister, Carita Doggett Corse, was a prominent Florida historian and the state's director of the Federal Writers' Project. The Doggett family residence is still located at 1548 Lancaster Terrace in Jacksonville's historic Riverside area. In his adolescence, Doggett developed a passion for literature and became aware of Stevens' poetry when he was a 21-year-old student. However, Doggett, a self-professed "goof-off" at that point in his life, did not seem likely to become a scholar. An unsuccessful student, first at Yale and then at the University of Florida, he transferred to Rollins College where he met and fell in love with poet and fellow student, Dorothy Emerson. A serious-minded person, Emerson initially would have little to do with him and told him he would have to settle down and study to win her attention. He did so and in 1933 they married, sharing a life devoted to literature for almost 60 years until her death in 1993. They had two children.

After graduating from Rollins in 1931, Doggett went to New York with the aim of entering the publishing world. He soon discovered that his chances there were bleak due to the effects of the Great Depression. With the financial support of his father, Doggett attended Emory but then went back to Jacksonville and became an English teacher at Landon High School. He and his wife lived at the Jacksonville Beaches. As the communities there grew, construction of Duncan U. Fletcher High School began and when the school opened in 1937 Doggett became its principal. With the exception of a brief stint in the Navy during World War II, he served as its principal until 1964 when the school was divided and the original facility became a junior high. Doggett then became the first principal of the new senior high and remained in that position until two years before his retirement in 1971. He has been acknowledged in the community for sustaining a strong academic focus at the school and for inspiring students who subsequently continued their education at colleges throughout the country.

Frank Doggett did not pursue his interest in literature or his career as a literary critic in the usual manner of scholars. As a high school principal, he was generally denied academic affiliations, yet he acquired scholarly recognition for his work. Helen Vendler, a Wallace Stevens scholar and professor of English at Boston and Harvard Universities, once stated that she was indebted to Doggett's work and felt that the barriers to pursuing a life of letters without an academic position would make doing so possible only for those with "great commitment and talent". Doggett also collaborated with his wife, his literary ally as well as an unsparing critic of his works. Doggett maintained throughout his life that his writing was the "result of a continuing dialogue with her" and that literature was their principal topic of conversation. A number of her poems have been published in Poetry and The Yale Review; a collection of her poems, Eve's Primer, was published by the Wallace Stevens Society in 1991.

Frank Doggett was also an accomplished fisherman, and held several light-tackle world records during his life.

== Publications ==
Books:

Dipped in Sky: A Study of Percy MacKaye’s Kentucky Mountain Cycle. New York: Longmans Green, 1930.

Stevens Poetry of Thought. Baltimore: Johns Hopkins University Press, 1966.

Wallace Stevens: The Making of the Poem. Baltimore: Johns Hopkins University Press, 1980.

Ed. with Robert Buttel. Wallace Stevens: A Celebration. Princeton, N. J.: Princeton University Press, 1980.

Essays in books:

“Repetitions of a Young Prince” Thematic Recurrence in Hamlet.” In All These to Teach: Essays in Honor of C. A. Robertson. Gainesville, FL: University of Florida Press, 1965.

“This Invented World: Stevens’ ‘Notes Toward a Supreme Fiction’.” In The Act of the Mind. Ed. Roy Harvey Pearce and J. Hillis Miller. Baltimore: Johns Hopkins Press, 1965.

“Our Nature is Her Nature.” In The Twenties: Poetry and Prose. Ed. Richard E. Langford and William E. Taylor. DeLand, FL: Edward Everett Press, 1966.

“Stevens’ Later Poetry.” In Critics on Wallace Stevens. Ed. Peter L. McNamara. Coral Gables, FL. University of Miami Press, 1972.

“Variations on a Nude.” In Wallace Stevens. Ed. Irvine Ehrenpreis. West Drayton, Middlesex, England: Penguin Books, 1972.

Authored with Dorothy Emerson. "On Stevens' Comments on Several Poems." In The Motivation for Metaphor. Ed. Frances C. Blessinglon and Guy Rotella. Boston: Northeastern University Press, 1983.

Essays in periodicals: “Stevens' 'It Must Change VI'." The Explicator. No. 16 (Feb. 1957); “Wallace Steven' Later Poetry.” ELH. No. 15 (June 1958); “Wallace Stevens Secrecy of Words: A Note on Import in Poetry." New England Quarterly. No. 31 (Sept. 1958); “Wallace Stevens and the World We Know." English Journal. No. 48 (Oct. 1959); “Abstractions and Wallace Stevens." Criticism. No. 2 (Winter 1960); “Stevens’ ‘Woman Looking at a Vase of Flowers.’” The Explicator. No. 19 (Nov. 1960); “The Poet of Earth: Wallace Stevens.” College English. No. 22 (March 1961); “This Invented World: Stevens' ‘Note Toward a Supreme Fiction.'" ELH. No. 28 (Sept. 1961); “Why Read Wallace Stevens?” Emory University Quarterly. No. 17 (Summer 1962); “Stevens' River That Flows Nowhere." Chicago Review. No. 15 (Summer 1962); “The Transition from Harmonium: Factors in the Development of Stevens’ Later Poetry.” PMLA. Vol. 88, No. 1 (Jan. 1973); “Romanticism's Singing Bird." Studies in English Literature. Vol. 14, No. 4 (Autumn 1974); “Stevens on the Genesis of a Poem." Contemporary Literature. Vol. 16, No. 4 (Autumn 1975); “A Primer of Possibility for 'The Auroras of Autumn.'" The Wallace Stevens Journal. Vol. 13, No. 1 (Spring 1989)
