= Mavis Sanders =

American scholar

Mavis G. Sanders is a senior principal researcher at the Learning Policy Institute, where she focuses on education policy, equity, and reform.

== Education ==
Sanders received a Bachelor's in Urban Studies with a concentration in political science and teaching certification in social studies from Barnard College in 1987. She received a Master's in Sociology from Stanford University in 1992 and a Ph.D. in Social Sciences, Policy, and Educational Practice from Stanford in 1995.

== Career ==
From 1987 through 1989 Sanders taught social studies and English in Papua New Guinea in the Peace Corps.

Sanders was faculty at Johns Hopkins University and a research scientist at Hopkins' Center for Research on the Education of Students Placed at Risk. She was director of Hopkins' Urban Education program and assistant director of the National Network of Partnership Schools. In 2011, she received Johns Hopkins Alumni Association Excellence in Teaching Award.

She was also a professor of education at the University of Maryland, Baltimore County (UMBC) and from 2017 to 2021 was inaugural director of UMBC’s Sherman Center for Early Learning in Urban Communities.

In 2021 she moved to Washington DC research institute Child Trends as a senior research scholar.

== Reception ==
In 2003 Pamela S. Angelle reviewed Schooling Students Placed at Risk (2000) in the Journal of Education for Students Placed at Risk.

In reviewing Sanders' 2005 Building School-Community Partnerships (reprinted in 2015), Soo Hong, writing in the Harvard Educational Review, said educators would find her work "a refreshing change." Hong notes that Sanders "makes two important distinctions as she lays the groundwork for her book: that community is not constrained by the geographical boundaries of neighborhoods, and that parental involvement — a part of community involvement — is not the focus of her book" and that the book challenges educators to work in ways that "move beyond a mere focus on parental involvement" and offers multiple concrete actionable ways to do so.

In 2020, Reuben Jacobson reviewed Sanders' latest book "Reviewing the Success of Full-Service Community Schools in the US: Challenges and Opportunities for Students, Teachers, and Communities" (with Claudia Galindo) in the School Community Journal.

== Research interests ==
Sanders studies education, racial equity, youth development, Black families and children, and full-service community schools.

== Selected publications ==
Sanders has authored over 60 publications including:

- Sanders, Mavis (1 January 1997). "Overcoming obstacles: Academic achievement as a response to racism and discrimination". Journal of Negro Education. 66 (1). Howard University Press: 83–93. doi:10.2307/2967253. JSTOR 2967253.
- Sanders, Mavis G. (1998). "The effects of school, family, and community support on the academic achievement of African American adolescents". Urban Education. 33 (3). SAGE Publications: 385–409. doi:10.1177/0042085998033003005. ISSN 0042-0859. S2CID 145455503.
- Sanders, Mavis G. (2000). Schooling Students Placed at Risk: Research, Policy, and Practice in the Education of Poor and Minority Adolescents. Routledge.
- Sanders, Mavis G. (1 September 2001). "The role of "community" in comprehensive school, family, and community partnership programs". The Elementary School Journal. 102. University of Chicago Press: 19–34. doi:10.1086/499691. S2CID 144391874.
- Sanders, Mavis; Harvey, Adia (1 October 2002). "Beyond the school walls: A case study of principal leadership for school-community collaboration". Teachers College Record. 104 (7). Columbia University: 1345–1368. doi:10.1111/1467-9620.00206. ISSN 0161-4681.
- Sanders, Mavis G. (2005). Building School-Community Partnerships: Collaboration for Student Success. Corwin Press. ISBN 978-1-4522-8089-9.
- Hrabowski, F. & Sanders, M. (2015, Winter). Strengthening Diversity in the Teaching Force: One University’s Perspective. Thought & Action (The NEA Higher Education Journal), 32, 101-116.
- Sanders, Mavis (2016). "Leadership, partnerships, and organizational development: Exploring components of effectiveness in three full-service community schools". School Effectiveness and School Improvement. 27 (2): 157–177. doi:10.1080/09243453.2015.1030432.
- Galindo, Claudia; Sanders, Mavis; Abel, Yolanda (2017). "Transforming Educational Experiences in Low-Income Communities". American Educational Research Journal. 54: 140S–163S. doi:10.3102/0002831216676571.
- Epstein, Joyce; Sanders, Mavis; et al. (2018). School, family, and community partnerships: Your handbook for action. Corwin Press.
