= Mayport Ferry =

Automobile ferry in Jacksonville, Florida, US

Coordinates: 30.395504°N 81.433341°W

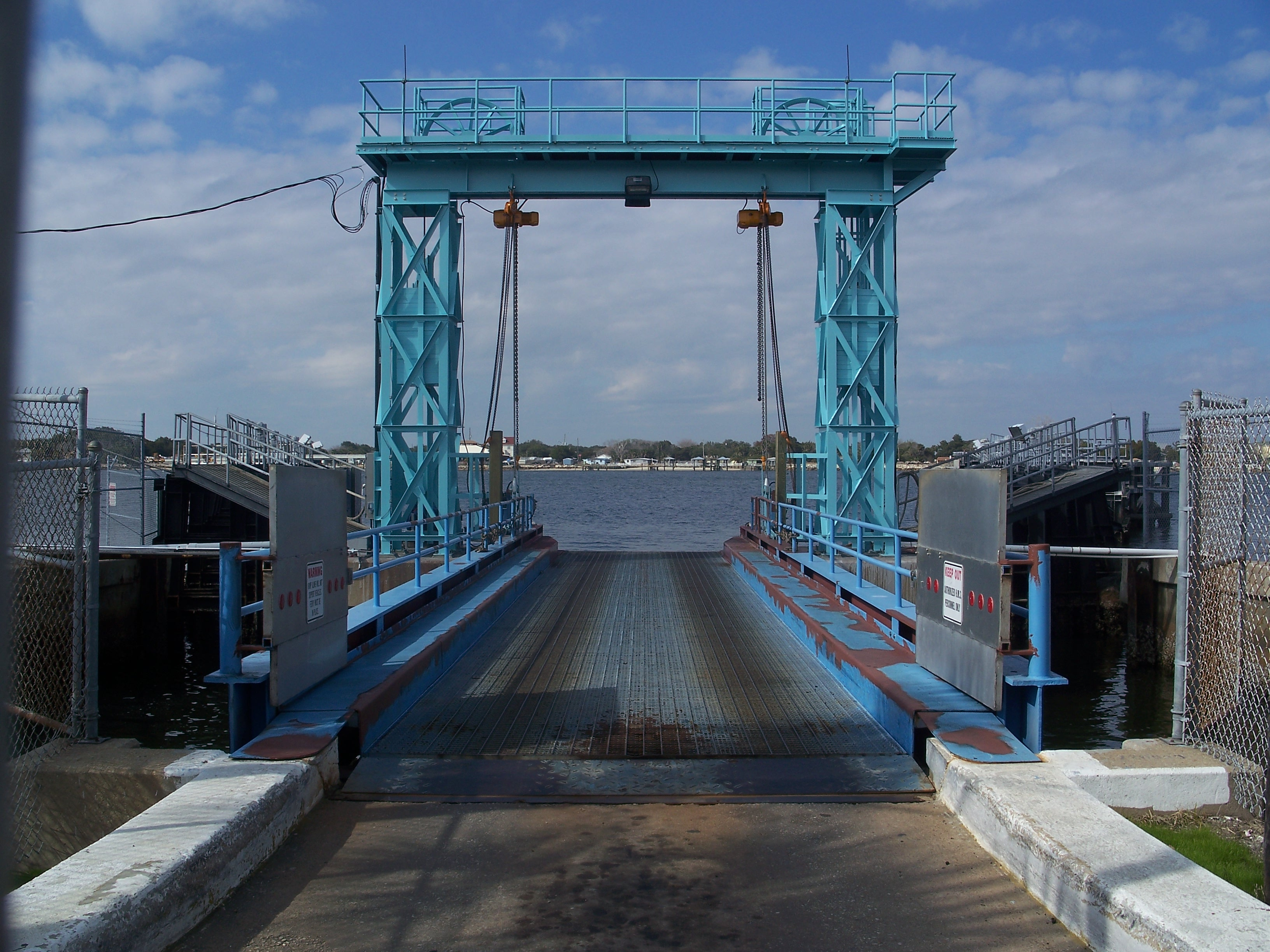
The Mayport Ferry

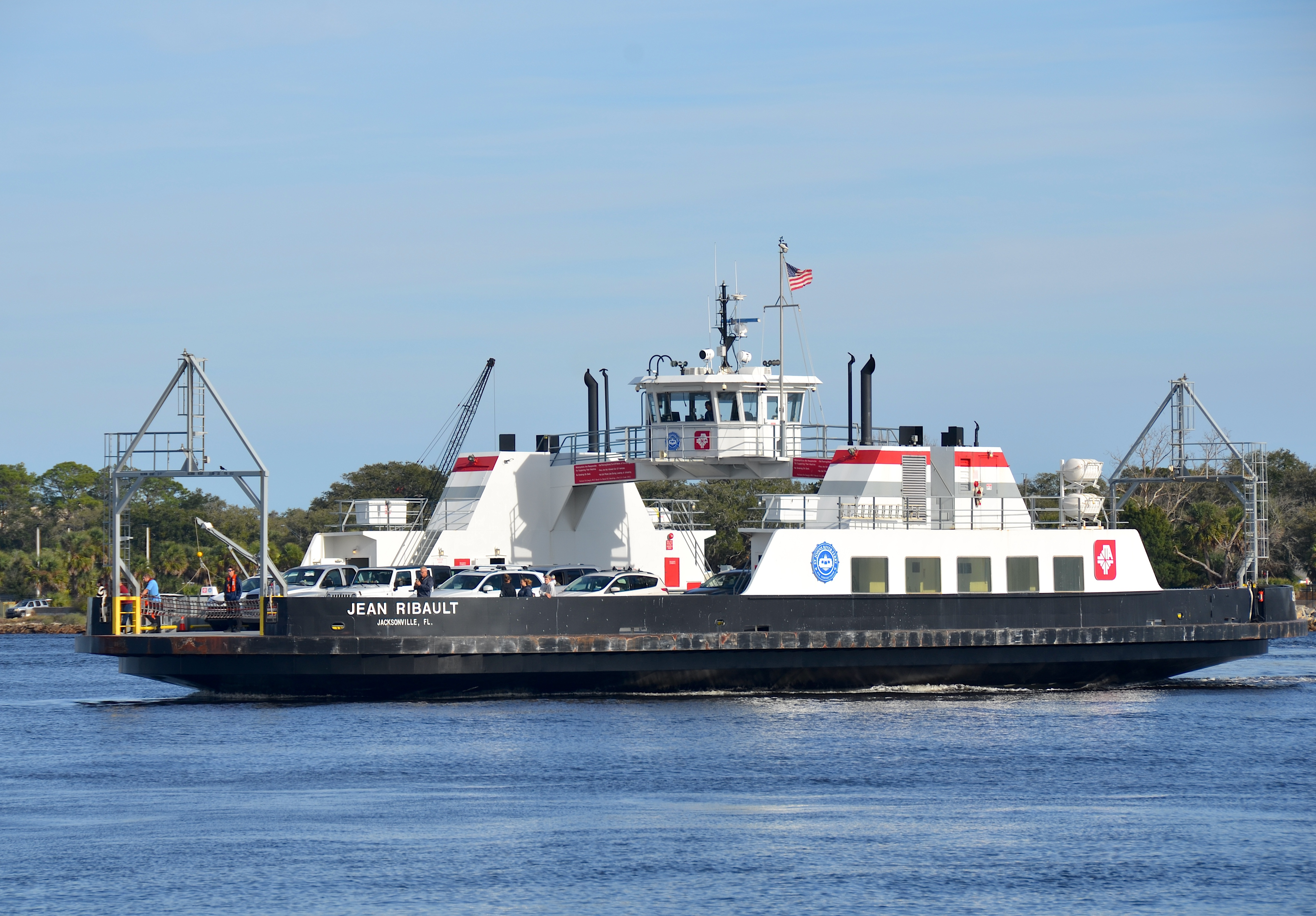
Jean Ribault vessel, named after Jean Ribault, French explorer, first European to see the St. John's River and founder of French Florida.

The Saint Johns River Ferry, also known as the Mayport Ferry, is an automobile ferry between Mayport and Fort George Island, two areas within Jacksonville, Florida. The 0.9 miles (1.4 km) voyage crosses the Saint Johns River about 2.5 miles (4.0 km) inland of the river's mouth and travels in an east-west direction for approximately 2,000 feet (610 m) on State Road A1A. It departs every half-hour. Mayport's on the southern side and Fort George Islands on the northern side.

The alternate driving route uses the toll-free Dames Point Bridge on I-295 but is 28 miles (45 km) long. The ferry has been operating since 1874.

These vessels operated in the ferry fleet:

- primary: Jean Ribault, built 1996, 40 vehicles, 206 passengers.
- stand-by: Blackbeard, built 1956, 42 vehicles, 207 passengers.

Additional ferries which were in service included the Jean LaFitte (named after French privateer Jean Lafitte), which was a 26-car ferry, the Reliance, the Sirus. U.S.Coast Guard documents these vessels; some of the older ferries have been renamed to pass inspection. The history of the ferry dates back to 1874 according to the New York Times and the Library of Congress. The Florida Department of Transportation, which had always operated the service, had the Mayport Ferry line item budget vetoed by Governor Charlie Crist for 2007-2008. The City of Jacksonville had been contributing $200,000-300,000 for several years, so instead of allowing the service to end, the City of Jacksonville assumed full responsibility. However, they lost over $1 million in one year, and Mayor John Peyton announced that there was insufficient money available in the new budget.

The Jacksonville Port Authority took over operation of the ferry for 2007 and lost $500,000 each year, but uses port revenue, not tax money, to underwrite the operation. After taking over, the JPA decided to cut costs and sell the Blackbeard, the backup vessel built in 1956. That meant that whenever the Jean Ribault had problems, ferry service would be suspended. On February 5, 2009 the ferry was put into dry dock for routine maintenance, but hull corrosion required an extra week of repairs, and there was no service for a month.

On March 31, 2016, the Jacksonville Transportation Authority took over permanent ownership and operation of the ferry.

The ferry helps connect segments of the East Coast Greenway, a 3000 mile long system of trails connecting Maine to Florida.

On May 4, 2025, Jean Ribault collided with a boarding ramp on the St. Johns River while departing from Mayport. No injuries were reported but the ferry was taken out of service. The ferry returned to service on June 13.

== Memorial ==
The United States Merchant Marine Memorial stands on the ferry grounds on the Mayport side. The Memorial was erected on September 14, 1999.
