= Vilano Beach, Florida =

Vilano Beach, Florida Villano Beach
- Census-designated place
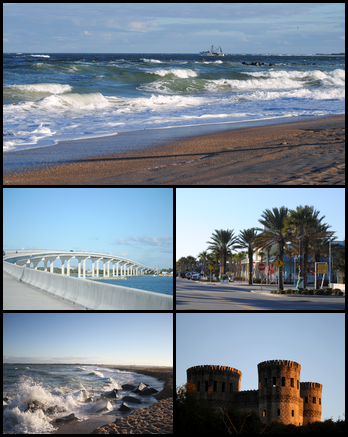
- Top, left to right: Vilano Beach, Francis and Mary Usina Bridge, Vilano Beach Town Center, St. Augustine Inlet, Castle Otttis

- Location in St. Johns County and the state of Florida
- Coordinates: 29°56′08″N 81°18′07″W
- Country: United States
- State: Florida
- County: St. Johns

Area
  - Total: 1.80 sq mi (4.67 km^{2})
  - Land: 1.77 sq mi (4.59 km^{2})
  - Water: 0.031 sq mi (0.08 km^{2})
- Elevation: 3 ft (0.91 m)

Population (2020)
  - Total: 2,514
  - Density: 1,417.6/sq mi (547.32/km^{2})
- Time zone: UTC-4:00 (EDT)
  - Summer (DST): UTC-5:00 (EST)
- FIPS code: 12-74400
- GNIS ID: 2402969

Vilano Beach is an unincorporated community and census-designated place (CDP) and in St. Johns County, Florida, United States. It was listed as the Villano Beach CDP by the U.S. Census Bureau from 1990 to 2010; however, the name was corrected to Vilano Beach for the 2020 census. The population was 2,514 at the 2020 census, down from 2,678 at the 2010 census. It is part of the Jacksonville, Florida Metropolitan Statistical Area and on the southern tip on San Pablo Island.

== Geography ==
According to the United States Census Bureau, the CDP has a total area of 1.8 square miles (4.7 km^{2}), all land.

== Demographics ==
Historical population
Census	Pop.	Note	%±
1990	1,867		—
2000	2,533		35.7%
2010	2,678		5.7%
2020	2,514		−6.1%
U.S. Decennial Census

Vilano Beach first appeared as a census designated place in the 2020 U.S. census.

=== 2020 census ===
As of the 2020 census, Vilano Beach had a population of 2,514. The median age was 58.9 years. 11.1% of residents were under the age of 18 and 32.7% of residents were 65 years of age or older. For every 100 females there were 102.1 males, and for every 100 females age 18 and over there were 99.6 males age 18 and over.

100.0% of residents lived in urban areas, while 0.0% lived in rural areas.

There were 1,203 households in Vilano Beach, of which 15.6% had children under the age of 18 living in them. Of all households, 56.0% were married-couple households, 16.3% were households with a male householder and no spouse or partner present, and 21.7% were households with a female householder and no spouse or partner present. About 28.2% of all households were made up of individuals and 15.4% had someone living alone who was 65 years of age or older.

There were 1,687 housing units, of which 28.7% were vacant. The homeowner vacancy rate was 3.9% and the rental vacancy rate was 16.9%.

Racial composition as of the 2020 census
Race	Number	Percent
White	2,297	91.4%
Black or African American	8	0.3%
American Indian and Alaska Native	9	0.4%
Asian	16	0.6%
Native Hawaiian and Other Pacific Islander	0	0.0%
Some other race	16	0.6%
Two or more races	168	6.7%
Hispanic or Latino (of any race)	123	4.9%

=== 2000 census ===
As of the census of 2000, there were 2,533 people, 1,168 households, and 746 families in the CDP. The population density was 1,411.8 inhabitants per square mile (545.1/km^{2}). There were 1,419 housing units at an average density of 790.9 per square mile (305.4/km^{2}). The racial makeup of the CDP was 97.32% White, 0.47% African American, 0.36% Native American, 0.71% Asian, 0.39% from other races, and 0.75% from two or more races. Hispanic or Latino of any race were 1.38% of the population.

Of the 1,168 households 20.1% had children under the age of 18 living with them, 54.2% were married couples living together, 6.2% had a female householder with no husband present, and 36.1% were non-families. 27.0% of households were one person and 8.0% were one person aged 65 or older. The average household size was 2.16 and the average family size was 2.58.

The age distribution was 15.2% under the age of 18, 5.8% from 18 to 24, 27.2% from 25 to 44, 35.5% from 45 to 64, and 16.2% 65 or older. The median age was 46 years. For every 100 females, there were 94.0 males. For every 100 females age 18 and over, there were 94.5 males.

The median household income was $54,111 and the median family income was $75,070. Males had a median income of $49,219 versus $37,353 for females. The per capita income for the CDP was $34,635. About 1.5% of families and 4.9% of the population were below the poverty line, including 1.8% of those under age 18 and 4.7% of those age 65 or over.

== Education ==
It is in the St. Johns County School District.

It is zoned to Keterlinus Elementary School, Sebastian Middle School, and St. Augustine High School.
