= Carita Doggett Corse =

American historian

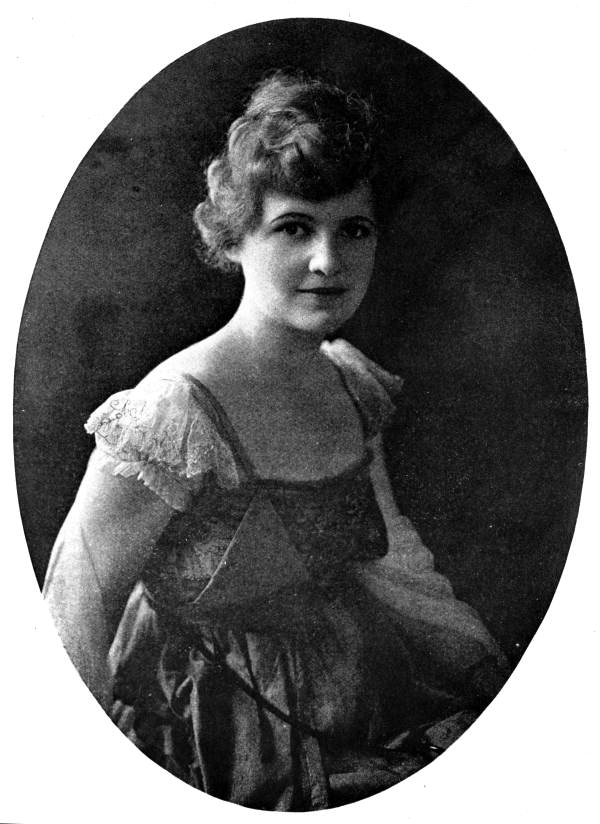
Carita Doggett Corse

Carita Doggett Corse (March 15, 1891 – May 23, 1978) was a Florida historian and writer who served as the Florida director of the Federal Writers’ Project. Her most well-known books are Dr. Andrew Turnbull and the New Smyrna Colony of Florida and The Key to the Golden Islands. Corse, an early suffragette, became the director of Florida's chapter of the newly created Planned Parenthood. In 1978, she was recognized for her work as a historian by the Florida Historical Society, and, in 1997, was posthumously inducted into the Florida Women's Hall of Fame, an honor roll recognizing women who have "made significant contributions to the improvement of life for women and all Florida citizens".

== Biography ==
Born in Jacksonville, Florida, Carita Doggett was the daughter of a prominent Jacksonville attorney and the eldest of four children. She earned her bachelor's degree at Vassar College and her master's degree at Columbia University; she was awarded an honorary doctorate of letters by the University of the South. As a Jacksonville resident, she was involved in numerous social and civic activities and, as a young woman, taught History and English at a private school. In 1921, Carita Doggett married Herbert Montgomery Corse, an engineer and Jacksonville businessman; they had four children. A brother, Frank Doggett, became an early authority on the American Modernist poet, Wallace Stevens.

Florida Historian and Author

Carita Doggett Corse was born into a family with historical connections dating to the early English settlement of what is now the United States as well as to the later development of Florida and the city of Jacksonville. Her ancestor, Thomas Doggett (Doged), in 1637 sailed to Boston, where he became a man of means and influence. His grandson married the great-granddaughter of Samuel Fuller, a passenger on the ship Mayflower. Corse was also a descendant of Andrew Turnbull, a Scottish physician who founded the colony at New Smyrna, the largest single attempt at British colonization in the New World. She was a great-granddaughter of John Locke Doggett, one of Jacksonville's founders, who came to Florida in 1820, purchased land on the St. Johns River and became a territorial judge and president of the Legislative Council of the Territory of Florida. Her grandfather, a captain in the Confederate Army, became a county judge and was corporate counsel for the City of Jacksonville.

Carita Corse combined scholarly research with an ability to describe Florida's historical heritage for a lay audience. She authored numerous historical publications on Florida, the best-known being Dr. Andrew Turnbull and the New Smyrna Colony of Florida, an account of the founding of the colony based on her research of previously unavailable documents and manuscripts at the British Colonial Office, and The Key to the Golden Islands, the story of the history and settlement of Fort George Island, located near Jacksonville at the northern end of the St. Johns.

The Federal Writers' Project

Carita Doggett Corse served as Florida's director of the Writers' Project from 1935 to 1942 (after 1939 it was funded by the state of Florida). She was one of the few state directors retained for the project's duration. The Federal Writers' Project was part of the Federal Works Progress Administration (WPA), and provided jobs for unemployed white-collar workers, including new and experienced writers. They produced books and pamphlets—in particular, state guidebooks. The guide to Florida, Florida: A Guide to the Southern-Most State was published within four years. As director, Corse was able to incorporate her ideas in the Florida project programs and publications. She was especially interested in the ethnic diversity of Florida and was one of the first state directors to actively collect folk history as a part of the project. Recalling conversations with a former slave while conducting research for her book on Fort George Island, Corse conceived the idea of doing something similar to achieve the Federal Writers' Projects emphasis on personal histories. She traveled across the state with other writers, conducting interviews, recording songs, collecting stories and taking photographs. Corse advocated for African-American participation in the project and created a Negro Writers' Unit to focus on black history and culture. Florida was one of just three states in the South to establish a Negro Writers' Unit and those writers were instrumental in producing the ex-slave narratives. Folklorist and author Zora Neale Hurston was the best-known African-American writer to contribute to the Florida Writers' Project. Efforts to obtain slave narratives were subsequently expanded to other southern states. More than 90 of the nearly 2,000 works published by the Federal Writers' Project were produced by Florida writers under the direction of Carita Doggett Corse.

== Publications ==
- Dr. Andrew Turnbull and the New Smyrna Colony of Florida. The Drew Press, 1919 ISBN 978-1611530261
- The Key to the Golden Islands. University of North Carolina Press, 1931 ISBN 978-1258276089
- Shrine of the Water Gods: Historical Account of Silver Springs, Florida. Carita Doggett Corse, 1935
- The Fountain of Youth and ancient Indian village and burial ground. Carita Doggett Corse, 1937 ISBN 9781258984847
