= Full-service community schools in the United States =

Community school model

A full-service community school (FSCS) in the United States focuses on partnerships between a school and its community. It integrates academics, youth development, family support, health and social services, and community development. Community schools are organized around the goals to help students learn and succeed and to strengthen families and communities. Full-service community schools extend the goals of traditional public schools further. They are centers of their communities that provide services to address the needs of student learners and build bridges between schools, families, and communities. They are schools that did not only promote academic excellence, but they also provide health, mental health, and social services on the school campus. The "school emerges as a community hub, a one-stop center to meet diverse needs and to achieve the best possible outcomes for each child."

== Description ==
Samberg and Sheeran (2000) define community schools as "both a set of partnerships and a place where services, supports, and opportunities lead to improved student learning, stronger families, and healthier communities." Community schools transform traditional public schools into partnerships for excellence by being a place where partnerships between educators, families, community volunteers, youth development organizations, and business, health, and social agencies, can come together.

The following definitions are attempts to clarify some terminology used in discussions around FSCSs. Linked services involve collaborative strategies, in which partners can share a vision, establish goals, and use resources to implement and deliver the services. School-linked services involve coordination with schools, families, and agencies located at or near the school. School-based services are more directly linked—physically and fiscally—to the school campus. The school becomes the vehicle to mobilize its surrounding community. The concept of full-service schools comes from Florida's 1991 innovative legislation, which called for the integration of educational, medical, and social and/or human services in a way that meets the needs of youth and their families on school grounds or in easily accessible locations.

According to Dryfoos and Maguire (2002), community schools include certain elements: "open all the time, run by a partnership, providing access to an array of services, responsive to the family and the community, and focused on overcoming barriers to learning."

=== The five conditions of learning ===
The Coalition for Community Schools (2003) has identified five conditions for learning that are essential for every child to succeed:

1. The school has a core instructional program with qualified teachers, a challenging curriculum, and high standards and expectations for students.
2. Students are motivated and engaged in learning—both in school and in community settings, during and after school.
3. The basic physical, mental, and emotional needs of young people and their families are recognized and addressed.
4. There is mutual respect and effective collaboration among parents, families and school staff.
5. Community engagement, together with school efforts, promote a school climate that is safe, supportive and respectful and that connects students to a broader learning community.

In addition to focusing on the needs of students inside the school, the majority of these conditions focus on students' needs outside the school, with community support being an essential component.

=== Components of FSCSs ===
Given the five conditions of learning mentioned above, FSCSs can bring together a package of different components and services:

- Case management – Outside agencies, like Communities-in-Schools, can work with local businesses to bring in a range of services into schools, including mentoring, after-school programs, mental health counseling, career counseling and employment programs, and community service opportunities.
- Primary health clinics – These facilities, operated in school buildings by outside health agencies, can provide primary health care, emergency care, dental examinations, mental health counseling, and health education.
- Youth development programs – Some community schools put together a number of different youth activities, including mentoring, substance abuse counseling, sports and recreation, community service learning, and pre-employment services.
- Family resource centers – Community schools can offer services for parents, such as parenting education, literacy, employment assistance, immigration information, housing help, food, clothing, case management, health services, and early child care.
- Early childhood development – Early childhood programs, such as Head Start, can relocate into schools and can provide services including, all-day child care, after-school and vacation care, and family support and guidance through a home visitation program.
- Referrals – School-based health centers and family resource centers can be the link that ensures that students and families' needs are met.
- After-school programs – After-school programs are important for the effectiveness of schools by providing school-age children with academic and nonacademic support.

== Community school examples ==
A number of community school models have sprung up around the country. Dryfoos & Maguire (2002) list a number of them:

Beacon community schools bring nonprofit community-based organizations (CBOs) into schools to make use of extended school hours for youth development and community enrichment. Beacons, introduced in New York City through the Department of Youth and Community Development, are heavily involved with community service projects to help enhance the neighborhood. County Cullen, a Beacon community school operated by the Rheedlen Centers in New York City, offers youth leadership opportunities, participates in a neighborhood beautification projects, and facilitates forums on community issues.

The Children's Aid Society (CAS) has created community schools that are built on a close relationship between the school system and outside agencies and address both school restructuring and the provision of one-stop services. CAS also nationally provides technical assistance to community schools.

In university-assisted community schools, university faculty members work with teachers on curriculum and with administrators on school restructuring. The University of Pennsylvania's West Philadelphia Improvement Corps is an example of a full-fledged community school, with extended hours and a range of one-stop services.

The Elizabeth Learning Center in California is an example of a pre-K through Grade 12 community school, which has child and family support services integrated into the educational restructuring. It is a "collaborative effort between Los Angeles Unified School District, the teachers' union, a variety of community partners, and the New American Schools Development Corporation.

Community Schools in Boston (CSIB) is an example of a model in which all Boston public schools are a part of this community schools vision. "The goal is to build a systemic approach to furthering and sustaining school-community ties and building strong partnerships within specific schools, communities and clusters (groups of schools)." One difficulty that is mentioned with this approach is attempting to balance centralized planning with decentralized relationship building.

=== Partnerships and governance ===
At the school site, the partnerships exist between principals, teachers, other school staff, and multiple community partners. Their goal is to create learning opportunities and services to help students develop academically, emotionally, physically, and socially. Additional partners with school site personnel are volunteers from public agencies, local government officials, non-profit agencies, community-based and faith-based organizations, philanthropies, businesses, and higher education personnel. Schools are the center of the community, and the shared resources lead to improved student learning, stronger families, and healthier communities. In many districts, partnerships develop greater community support for local schools by gathering resources, bringing in outside expertise, and providing services that the district cannot provide itself.

The school is the primary player in the partnerships and collaborations, and the principal may act as the leader. Alternatively, the principal can act with a full-time coordinator who works for another agency. Out of the collective of partnerships between the school and community agencies, a lead agency often emerges, usually to extend the hours of the school and the scope of services provided.

== History of full-service schools ==
In the early 1900s, children living in poverty in the U.S. were predominantly from immigrant families. In 1889, Jane Addams established a Hull House in Chicago, which brought health and educational services to working families in immigrant neighborhoods. Addams's work, based on an English model, was founded on "the theory that social ills are interconnected and must be approached holistically." John Dewey was influenced by Addams's work and adapted the social change philosophy to schools. Dewey stated, "The conception of the schools as a social center is born of our entire democratic movement." By the early 20th Century, many cities began to recognize schools as social centers, and many states enacted legislation to allow communities to use school facilities more widely (e.g., as art galleries, movie theaters, local health offices).

During the Great Depression, schools were seen as an investment and school facilities continued to be used for multiple purposes. In 1934, Leonard Cavello, an Italian immigrant living in East Harlem, established Benjamin Franklin High School and used the school community to address social problems, which was the first attempt to make the school the coordinator of social services.

After World War II, the community school movement continued to expand, especially with the work of Charles Mott around bringing to youth recreation and school-linked health and social services to the school campus. Psychologists, school nurses, and social workers became an increasing part of the public school system between 1930 and 1960. President Johnson's Great Society initiatives focused on the country on the less fortunate, and the Elementary and Secondary Education Act (ESEA) of 1965 increased the federal government's role in education and education programming for the country's neediest students. The rise of the Head Start Program in 1965, "was a tacit acknowledgement by the government that schools alone are not enough to address the underlying problem of social poverty." The passage of federal legislation in the 1970s—including the Community Schools Act of 1978—paved the way for state governments to focus legislative efforts on the creation of more community schools, which continued through the 1980s and 1990s.

In the mid 1990s, several non-profit parties entered the political arena around full-service schools, including "Coalition for Community Schools (CCS), Communities in Schools (CIS), Schools of the 21st Century (an initiative of Yale University), the National Community Education Association (NCEA), and the Children's Aid Society (CAS). These entities worked with agencies and state governments to provide more services at local schools, gain further legislative support around community schools, and convert public schools to community schools.

== Federal legislation ==
In addition to the Community Schools Act of 1978, other federal legislation over the past decade has put community schools and collaborative efforts on the forefront of education policies and legislation.

The Full-Service Community Schools Act of 2011 will authorize the United States Department of Education grant program to expand the number of full-service community schools across the nation. The bill would fund grants for states to expand the model at the state level and also for local partnerships between school districts and community-based organizations.

According to Communities in Schools, The Keeping Parents and Communities Engaged Act (Keeping PACE) amends the ESEA "to encourage and support parent, family, and community involvement in schools, to provide needed supports and services to young people, and to ensure that schools are centers of communities." The act also establishes three new grant programs: Schools as Centers of Communities; Connecting Students to Community Resources and Comprehensive Supports; and Parent and Community Outreach and Coordination.

The Developing Innovative Partnerships and Learning Opportunities that Motivate Achievement (DIPLOMA) Act merges the Full Service Community Schools Act and the Keeping PACE Act. The Act promotes a shared approach to education by authorizing grants to incentivize partnerships between schools, parents, business leaders, higher education institutions, and community-based organizations.

The Working to Encourage Community Action and Responsibility in Education (WeCare) Act amends Title I of ESEA and requires "states and local educational agencies (LEAs) to assess the nonacademic factors affecting student academic performance and work with other public, private, non-profit, and community-based entities to address those factors."

The 21st Century Community Learning Centers program supports the creation of community learning centers that provides academic enrichment to students—especially students who attend high poverty and low-performing schools—during non-school hours.

Time for Innovation Matters in Education (TIME) Act of 2011 authorizes the Secretary of Education to award grants to LEAs or partnerships between LEAs and other public or nonprofit entities to plan and implement expanding learning time initiatives, especially at high-needs schools.

The Supporting Community Schools Act amends the ESEA to allow LEAs to use Title I funds to transform a school identified for improvement, corrective action, or restructuring into a community school.

The Teaching Fellows for Expanded Learning and After-School Act of 2007 awards competitive grants to eligible entities to recruit, select, train, and support 21st century community learning center programs, among others.

== Community schools and impact on children in poverty ==
Students in the United States come to school with different circumstances at home and in their community. In Parsing the Achievement Gap, Barton and Coley identify eight factors before and beyond school that influence the achievement gap, including: frequently changing schools; low birth weight, environmental damage (e.g., exposure to lead or mercury); hunger and nutrition, talking and reading to babies and young children; excessive television watching; parent-pupil ration; and summer achievement gain/loss. Many students will leave school with unequal skills and abilities. Children differ on how ready they are to fully engage in school every day. These differences are strongly influenced by their social class. Differences in social classes will result in differences in childrearing and children's health. Children in lower-income households: have poorer health; suffer from undiagnosed vision problems; lack adequate dental care; have poor nutrition; are more likely to develop asthma; and are more likely to be born premature or with low birth weights. In order to raise student academic achievement, lower-class children must live in better social and economic conditions. Pedro Noguera agrees that schools cannot be the only vehicle to help eradicate this poverty.

And schools alone - not even the very best schools - cannot erase the effects of poverty. In recent years, policymakers have focused on how to achieve higher test scores without addressing the influence of poverty. The results have mostly been discouraging. U.S. Education Secretary Arne Duncan claims that thousands of schools across America are chronically underperforming; in New York, Mayor Bloomberg and Schools Chancellor Joel Klein have shut down more than 100 schools in eight years. Inevitably, the struggling schools serve the poorest children and experience the greatest challenges. It will take more than pressure and tough talk to improve these schools.

Traditional public schools may not have the capacity to address all of the challenges and barriers that face children living in poverty or in low-income households. Through its partnerships, community schools can address a wider range of the issues facing these children and families.

=== The need for community schools ===
Dryfoos and Maguire (2002) propose that children in different communities face significant barriers to learning that schools cannot overcome alone. They argue that FSCSs can help overcome many of those barriers in the following ways:

- Readiness to learn – Community schools can help improve children's early readiness to learn by incorporating childhood learning centers and parent education classes into the school.
- Supportive adults – Community schools can ensure that relationships are established between young people and adults in the community (i.e., health care providers, case managers, additional social workers, and volunteer mentors) by integrating these services with existing pupil personnel services on the campus.
- Extended learning opportunities – Community schools can open have schools open for longer hours, which can allow for creative enrichment programs and after-school programs that can integrate activities with classroom curriculum.
- Parent involvement – In community schools, parents can participate on planning and advisory boards, can volunteer at schools, and can be hired as teacher's aides and outreach workers.
- Lifelong learning – If open during evenings and weekends, community schools can be convenient centers for adults to take credit and noncredit courses to advance their careers or enhance their lives.
- Opportunity to perform community service – Community schools can facilitate service learning placements in the community and can ensure that the knowledge gained from the experience is integrated into the classroom instruction.
- Access to health care – Community schools can encompass on-site primary health and mental health clinics with trained professionals from community agencies.
- Integration of services – Community schools can bring together different services and agencies to one site, with centralized records and common policies.
- Safe communities – Community schools can provide a safe place for children early in the morning to late in the evening.
- Positive school environment – In order for students and parents to feel more connected to the school, community schools can create service networks to deal with problem behaviors on site.
- Changing demographics – Community schools can leverage partnerships to create multicultural environments that celebrates the differences and encourages students' success.
- Basic needs – In addition to lunch, community schools can institute breakfast, snack, and dinner programs, to meet the needs of students who are coming to school hungry. Through a family resource center, community schools can also ensure that children have warm clothing, and that parents find adequate housing.
- Quality education – Community schools can create a more effective environment through allowing teachers to focus on teaching, since partnerships with community agencies can focus on behavioral and social issues and can plan activities and programs that can be integrated into the school curriculum.

=== Education, human capital, and economic growth ===
Michael Engle (2000) discusses the development of research around the relationship between education, human capital, and economic growth. He discusses conclusions by other researchers since the 1950s around the high rate of returns on individual investments in education as measured by income. Engle concludes that, "Money for schools could be regarded not as consumption spending but as an investment in human resources that will pay off in the future." This conclusion emphasizes the importance of investing in schools, in order to have high rates of returns in regards to income. Additionally, Wilensky and Kline argue that the widely believed notion that public schools are meant to prepare students for jobs and economic productivity is false and risks failure at the outset. They argue that advances in educational attainment "cannot compensate for the deterioration in real earnings of young workers that have characterized the American economy since 1973." This results in a large gap between the wealthy and poor. They argue that educators must look beyond the marketplace in defining the mission of public schools and must instead help create schools and communities that contribute to a positive community culture.

=== Other education reform efforts ===
Among the many educational reform efforts, such as charter schools, school vouchers, magnet schools, and alternative schools, the full-service community school model is one of many educational reform efforts that are intended to increase student achievement, but the full-service community school model specifically focuses on the development of the community as a whole. A charter school receives public funds but is not subject to all of the rules, regulations, and statutes public schools must adhere to. A charter school is accountable to what is sent forth in its individual charter. A school voucher is a certificate issued by the government to allow families to apply it the cover the tuition at a private school. A magnet school is a public school with specialized courses and curricula. An alternative school is a school that serves students who are at risk of not achieving academically or are better served by a non-traditional program. "Only when schools are part of a larger enterprise committed to raising and educating children as part of the community can they adequately fulfill their role." Full-service community schools act like a 'one-stop-shop' that provides the vital services beyond the school campus to those who are most in need.

=== Academic and non-academic support ===
Of all developed countries, the United States has the most children living in poverty, and the poverty in the U.S. leads to poor performance in schools. Cambell-Allen et al. claim that at the base of the gap between academic achievement and opportunity is the fact that students "live and work in an unequal world with unequal services and opportunities which lead to a disparity among incoming students' school readiness".

Research indicates that children are more likely to be successful in school and later in life if they receive academic and non-academic support. Families of different social classes are more likely to receive different amounts of support. Families living in poverty and middle-class families face differences in regards to childrearing and children's health—including vision, hearing, oral health, lead exposure, asthma, use of alcohol, smoking, birth weight, and nutrition—and have difficulty attaining and fully utilizing government aid. While these differences, may not significantly affect the academic achievement gap between classes on an individual basis, "together, they add up to a cumulative disadvantage for lower-class children that can't help but depress average performance.

== Assessment and evaluation ==
While there is no clear agreement on how many full-service community schools there are in the country, there are many schools that have instituted relevant pieces of the FSCS model, including extended hours, primary health care centers, or family resource centers. The schools cover a broad continuum, from fully realized schools that have existed for at least a decade to schools that are just opening and offering expanded opportunities. This makes it difficult to evaluate the progress and performance of all community schools. Additionally, the quality of assessments between schools varies enormously, which also contributes to the difficulty of the evaluation. "At best, evaluation is difficult, expensive, and long term." Dryfoos & Maguire (2002) argue that test scores are not the only indicators of success at community schools.

"In addition to test scores, indicators of learning and achievement include rates of attendance, promotion, graduation, suspension, and expulsion. It is important to note that many community school models are designed to affect not only education outcomes but also other outcomes that, in turn, are known to affect education outcomes. Such intermediate outcomes include improved social behavior and healthy youth development, better family functioning and increased parental involvement, enhanced school and community climate, and access to support services."

"Research makes it clear that community schools work. In districts across America, community schools are improving student earning, strengthening families and schools, and building communities so that they all function together to contribute to student success."

In 2000, Joy G. Dryfoos was able to gather evaluation information from 49 school-community programs. The results were classified into four categories: (1) Learning and achievement outcomes; (2) Behavioral outcomes; (3) Family well-being; and (4) Community life.

Learning and achievement outcomes

- Achievement – Over a two- or three-year period, 36 of the 49 programs reported academic gains, particularly in reading and math, and mostly at the elementary level.
- Attendance – 19 programs reported improvements in school attendance, and several reported lower drop out rates of students.
- Suspensions – 11 programs reported a reduction in suspensions, but this may be due to changes in suspension policies at schools.

Behavioral outcomes

- High-Risk Behaviors – 11 programs reported that there was a general improvement in behavior and/or reduction rates regarding substance abuse, teen pregnancy, and disruptive behavior in the classroom.

Family well-being

- Parent Involvement – At least 12 programs reported an increase in parent involvement.
- Family Functioning – Improved family functioning was reported for many community school programs with a strong focus on family.

Community life

- Access to Services – Each program was reported at least once for having better access to health care, access to dental care, lower hospitalization rates, and higher immunization rates.
- Neighborhood – Six programs reported lower violence rates and also safer streets in their communities.

In 2020 Mavis G. Sanders and Claudia L. Galindo published an impact review volume, Reviewing the Success of Full-Service Community Schools in the US.

== Barriers to creating FSCSs ==
Dryfoos and Maguire (2002) mention some of the implementation barriers that many community schools face, which include:

- Lack of space – Some schools are new and created at the center of the community, while others involve careful planning and redesign of existing facilities that may require considerable modification over time.
- Turf – The responsibility and space of the community schools can feel like it belongs to teachers during the school day and to outside agencies during the extended-day program.
- Maintenance – Extending the school hours can create a great deal of pressure on maintenance and custodial staff.
- Transportation – Transportation can pose problems because extending the school's hours may not coincide with public transportation schedules, and may thus leave some students with limited options to return home. Cost is a significant consideration when dealing with transportation problems because providing additional busing can be very expensive.
- Confidentiality – Sharing difficulties can arise, especially when community schools are trying to integrate two different cultures, such as school and social support.
- Discipline – School personnel and community agency personnel have different views about how to deal with discipline issues. Discipline policies will need to be established in the planning stage of the community school.
- The Need for Integration – Services that are brought into the school by outside agencies must align with the school's educational system.
- Sufficient Funding – Most community schools depend on multiple sources of funding beyond state and federal per-pupil dollars. This funding burden can fall on the principal or the community-based organization, depending on the community school model being employed.

== Notable researchers ==
- Joy G. Dryfoos
- Mavis Sanders

== See also ==
- Community School in the United States
- Harlem Children's Zone (While this program is centered around charter schools and not traditional public schools, it essentially follows the same framework as the FSCSs mentioned in this article.)
