= Atlantic Beach, Florida =

- City
- City of Atlantic Beach
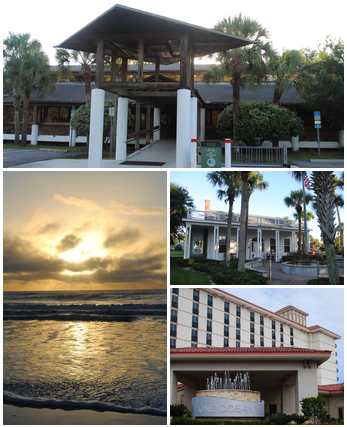
- Images top, left to right: City Hall, sunrise at the beach, Adele Grage Cultural Center, One Ocean Resort

- Seal
- Nickname: "AB"
- Location of Atlantic Beach in Duval County, Florida.

- Location in Florida Atlantic Beach (the United States) Atlantic Beach (North America)
- Coordinates: 30°20′28″N 81°22′48″W
- Country: United States
- State: Florida
- County: Duval

Area
  - Total: 13.17 sq mi (34.10 km^{2})
  - Land: 3.68 sq mi (9.53 km^{2})
  - Water: 9.49 sq mi (24.57 km^{2})
- Elevation: 0 ft (0 m)

Population (2020)
  - Total: 13,513
  - Density: 3,671.2/sq mi (1,417.46/km^{2})
- Time zone: UTC-5 (Eastern (EST))
  - Summer (DST): UTC-4 (EDT)
- ZIP codes: 32233
- Area codes: 904, 324
- FIPS code: 12-02400
- GNIS feature ID: 2403127
- Website: City of Atlantic Beach

Atlantic Beach is a city in Duval County, Florida, United States and the second largest of the Jacksonville Beaches communities. When the majority of communities in Duval County consolidated with Jacksonville in 1968, Atlantic Beach, along with Jacksonville Beach, Neptune Beach, and Baldwin, remained quasi-independent. Like the other towns, it maintains its own municipal government, but its residents vote in the Jacksonville mayoral election and have representation on the Jacksonville city council. The population was 13,513 at the 2020 census, up from 12,655 at the 2010 census. It is part of the Jacksonville, Florida Metropolitan Statistical Area.

== History ==
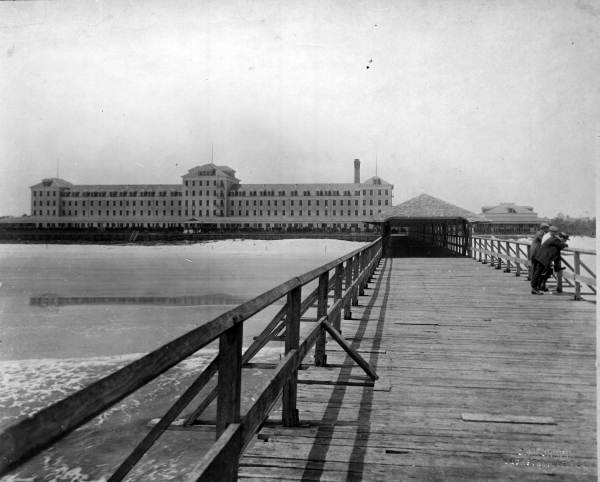
Atlantic Beach Hotel in 1919.

In 1900 Henry Flagler built the Mayport branch of the railroad and erected a station north of where the Adele Grage Cultural Center is currently located. Soon afterward Henry Flagler along with Isaac George built a large hotel called the Continental Hotel on the railroad line between Pablo Beach (Jacksonville Beach) and Mayport. The hotel was a summer resort with 250 guest rooms. There was also a dance pavilion, tennis courts, and a fishing pier. In 1913 the railroad sold most of the land to the Atlantic Beach Corporation which then began paving streets, installing lights, and water and sewer lines. In that same year the Continental Hotel changed its name to the Atlantic Beach Hotel. However, during World War I people were afraid to come to the coast and the Atlantic Beach Corporation went bankrupt. To make matters worse the Atlantic Beach Hotel burned down on September 20, 1919. After the war land began to sell again and the settlement grew. The Town of Atlantic Beach was incorporated in 1926 and the first charter was drafted by Isaac George and adopted in 1929. The first town hall burned down in 1932, so a new one was built later that year. The newly established Mayport Naval Station and the construction of the Mathews Bridge led to the further development of the town. The boundaries of Atlantic Beach were extended in 1987 with the annexation of Seminole Beach, and again in 1996 by extending the westerly boundary to the Intracoastal Waterway.

== Geography ==
According to the United States Census Bureau, the city has a total area of 13.0 square miles (33.6 km^{2}), of which 3.5 square miles (9.0 km^{2}) is land and 9.5 square miles (24.6 km^{2}) (73.07%) is water.

== Transportation ==
=== Major highways ===
- SR A1A
- SR 10

== Demographics ==
Historical population
Census	Pop.	Note	%±
1930	164		—
1940	468		185.4%
1950	1,604		242.7%
1960	3,125		94.8%
1970	6,132		96.2%
1980	7,847		28.0%
1990	11,636		48.3%
2000	13,368		14.9%
2010	12,655		−5.3%
2020	13,513		6.8%
U.S. Decennial Census

=== Racial and ethnic composition ===
Atlantic Beach racial composition (Hispanics excluded from racial categories) (NH = Non-Hispanic)
Race	Pop 2010	Pop 2020	% 2010	% 2020
White (NH)	10,023	10,743	79.20%	79.50%
Black or African American (NH)	1,345	969	10.63%	7.17%
Native American or Alaska Native (NH)	54	34	0.43%	0.25%
Asian (NH)	230	279	1.82%	2.06%
Pacific Islander or Native Hawaiian (NH)	10	10	0.08%	0.07%
Some other race (NH)	21	56	0.17%	0.41%
Two or more races/Multiracial (NH)	292	577	2.31%	4.27%
Hispanic or Latino (any race)	680	845	5.37%	6.25%
Total	12,655	13,513		

=== 2020 census ===
As of the 2020 census, Atlantic Beach had a population of 13,513. The median age was 47.9 years. 16.7% of residents were under the age of 18 and 24.1% of residents were 65 years of age or older. For every 100 females there were 91.7 males, and for every 100 females age 18 and over there were 91.3 males age 18 and over.

100.0% of residents lived in urban areas, while 0.0% lived in rural areas.

There were 5,996 households in Atlantic Beach, of which 23.1% had children under the age of 18 living in them. Of all households, 46.5% were married-couple households, 17.8% were households with a male householder and no spouse or partner present, and 28.8% were households with a female householder and no spouse or partner present. About 29.3% of all households were made up of individuals and 13.7% had someone living alone who was 65 years of age or older.

There were 6,537 housing units, of which 8.3% were vacant. The homeowner vacancy rate was 1.0% and the rental vacancy rate was 5.6%.

=== 2020 ACS estimates ===
The U.S. Census Bureau's 2020 ACS 5-year estimates reported 3,658 families residing in the city.

In 2020, the median income for a household in the city was $92,056, and the median income for a family was $116,701. The per capita income for the city was $64,350. About 4.2% of the population was below the poverty line, including 1.5% of those under age 18 and 6.5% of those age 65 or over.

=== 2010 census ===
As of the 2010 United States census, there were 12,655 people, 5,391 households, and 3,171 families residing in the city.

=== 2000 census ===
As of the census of 2000, there are 13,368 people, 5,623 households, and 3,643 families residing in the city. The population density is 1,383.8/km^{2} (3,584.3/mi^{2}). There are 6,003 housing units at an average density of 621.4/km^{2} (1,609.5/mi^{2}). The racial makeup of the city is 82.23% White, 12.69% African American, 0.26% Native American, 2.09% Asian, 0.03% Pacific Islander, 1.12% from other races, and 1.58% from two or more races. 4.18% of the population are Hispanic or Latino of any race.

As of 2000, there were 5,623 households, out of which 28.2% had children under the age of 18 living with them, 48.9% were married couples living together, 12.4% had a female householder with no husband present, and 35.2% were non-families. 26.5% of all households were made up of individuals, and 9.8% had someone living alone who was 65 years of age or older. The average household size was 2.36 and the average family size was 2.86.

In 2000, in the city, the population was spread out, with 22.5% under the age of 18, 7.0% from 18 to 24, 30.9% from 25 to 44, 24.3% from 45 to 64, and 15.4% who were 65 years of age or older. The median age was 39 years. For every 100 females, there were 94.7 males. For every 100 females age 18 and over, there were 91.2 males.

In 2000, the median income for a household in the city is $48,353, and the median income for a family is $53,854. Males have a median income of $37,438 versus $27,321 for females. The per capita income for the city is $28,618. 8.8% of the population and 5.7% of families are below the poverty line. Out of the total people living in poverty, 14.3% are under the age of 18 and 5.8% are 65 or older.

== Notable people ==
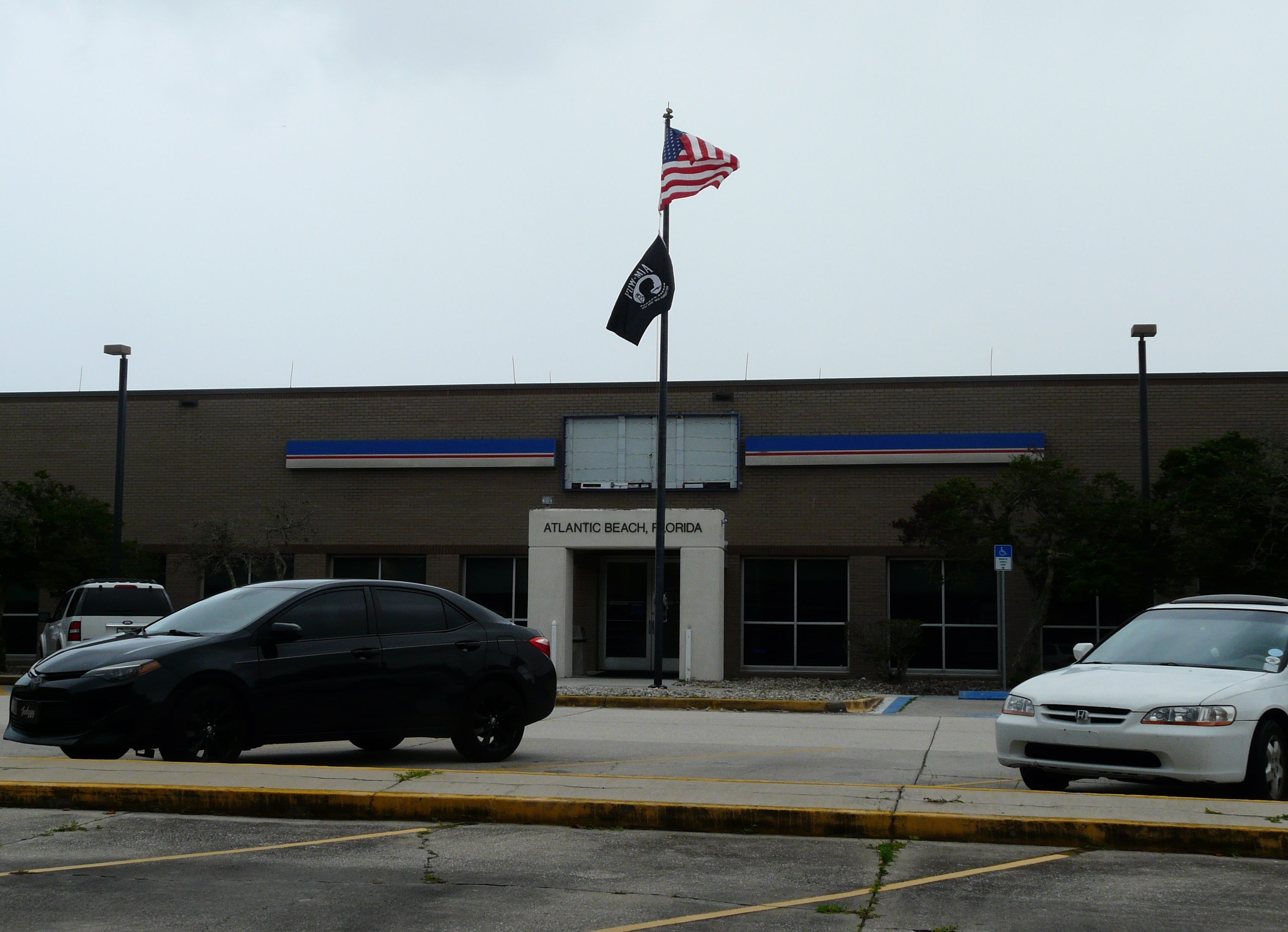
Post office

- Linden Ashby (born 1960), American actor and martial artist
- Kyle Brady (born 1972), former professional American football player
- Carey Cavanaugh (born 1955), former U.S. Ambassador (grew up in Atlantic Beach)
- Paula Coughlin (born 1962), former naval aviator in the United States Navy and whistleblower, known for her role in Tailhook scandal
- Julie Nixon Eisenhower (born 1948), Author, and wife of David Eisenhower
- Pat Frank (1908–1964), American writer, newspaperman, and government consultant
- Charles T. Meide (born 1971), American maritime archaeologist
- Caitlin Parrish, American playwright, television writer, and filmmaker
- Claire Rasmus (born 1996), freestyle swimmer and Pan American Games champion
- Willard J. Smith (1910–2000), 13th Commandant of the United States Coast Guard
- Whitney Thompson (born 1987), model, winner of America's Next Top Model
- Norvell G. Ward (1912–2005), American naval officer, Navy Cross recipient

== See also ==
- Jacksonville Beaches
- Greater Jacksonville
