= Mayport (Jacksonville) =

Neighborhood of Jacksonville, Florida

Coordinates: 30°23′40.2″N 81°25′47.7″W

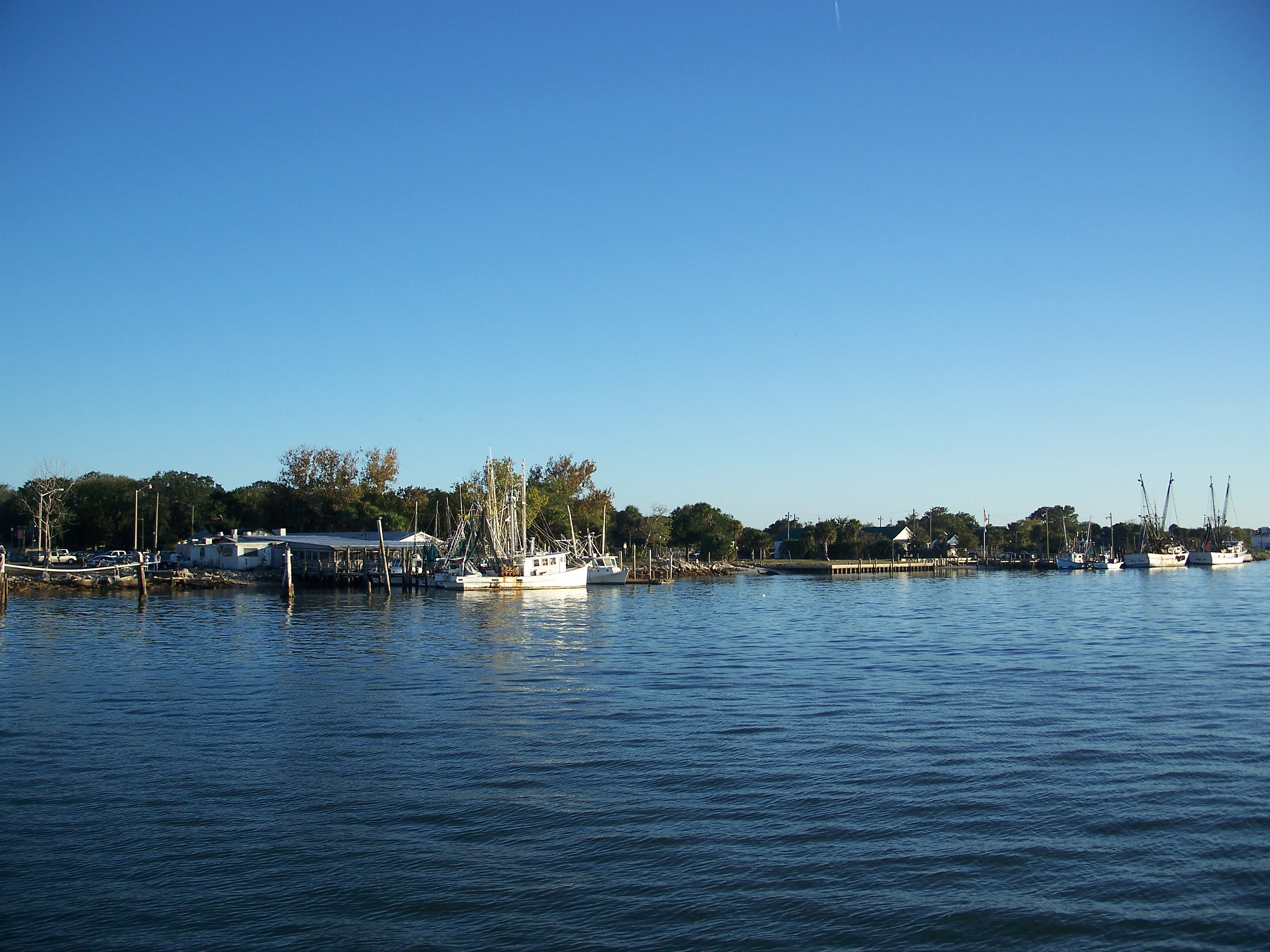
Mayport seen from the Mayport Ferry.

Mayport is a small community located between Naval Station Mayport and the St. Johns River in Jacksonville, Florida. It is part of the Jacksonville Beaches communities on San Pablo Island. The only public road to Mayport is State Road A1A, which crosses the St. Johns River Ferry to Fort George Island. On June 3, 1909, through action of the state legislature, Mayport was incorporated as a city.

== Climate ==
According to the Köppen Climate Classification system, Mayport has a humid subtropical climate, abbreviated "Cfa" on climate maps. The hottest temperature recorded in Mayport was 103 °F (39.4 °C) on July 19–20, 1986, June 20, 1990, July 31, 1990, and June 23, 2022, while the coldest temperature recorded was 8 °F (−13.3 °C) on January 21, 1985.

Climate data for Mayport, Florida, 1991–2020 normals, extremes 1959–present
Month	Jan	Feb	Mar	Apr	May	Jun	Jul	Aug	Sep	Oct	Nov	Dec	Year
Record high °F (°C)	87 (31)	90 (32)	91 (33)	96 (36)	100 (38)	103 (39)	103 (39)	101 (38)	100 (38)	96 (36)	89 (32)	87 (31)	103 (39)
Mean maximum °F (°C)	79.7 (26.5)	82.0 (27.8)	85.5 (29.7)	88.5 (31.4)	92.4 (33.6)	95.7 (35.4)	97.1 (36.2)	95.7 (35.4)	93.1 (33.9)	88.3 (31.3)	83.8 (28.8)	80.9 (27.2)	97.7 (36.5)
Mean daily maximum °F (°C)	63.9 (17.7)	66.5 (19.2)	71.4 (21.9)	77.1 (25.1)	83.3 (28.5)	87.9 (31.1)	90.4 (32.4)	89.2 (31.8)	85.9 (29.9)	79.8 (26.6)	72.4 (22.4)	66.2 (19.0)	77.8 (25.5)
Daily mean °F (°C)	55.2 (12.9)	58.0 (14.4)	62.8 (17.1)	68.7 (20.4)	75.4 (24.1)	80.4 (26.9)	82.5 (28.1)	82.2 (27.9)	79.6 (26.4)	73.1 (22.8)	64.5 (18.1)	58.1 (14.5)	70.0 (21.1)
Mean daily minimum °F (°C)	46.5 (8.1)	49.4 (9.7)	54.2 (12.3)	60.4 (15.8)	67.5 (19.7)	72.9 (22.7)	74.7 (23.7)	75.2 (24.0)	73.4 (23.0)	66.4 (19.1)	56.5 (13.6)	50.1 (10.1)	62.3 (16.8)
Mean minimum °F (°C)	30.9 (−0.6)	34.3 (1.3)	39.3 (4.1)	47.6 (8.7)	57.7 (14.3)	68.0 (20.0)	71.3 (21.8)	71.9 (22.2)	66.6 (19.2)	52.4 (11.3)	41.4 (5.2)	35.9 (2.2)	28.9 (−1.7)
Record low °F (°C)	8 (−13)	21 (−6)	28 (−2)	37 (3)	47 (8)	57 (14)	67 (19)	68 (20)	57 (14)	41 (5)	27 (−3)	15 (−9)	8 (−13)
Average precipitation inches (mm)	2.93 (74)	2.58 (66)	3.06 (78)	2.48 (63)	3.03 (77)	6.61 (168)	5.43 (138)	5.96 (151)	6.44 (164)	4.98 (126)	2.28 (58)	2.76 (70)	48.54 (1,233)
Average precipitation days (≥ 0.01 in)	9.3	8.7	9.0	7.2	7.4	12.8	12.9	14.5	11.7	9.5	8.5	9.2	120.7
Source 1: NOAA
Source 2: XMACIS2

== See also ==
- Neighborhoods of Jacksonville
- Naval Station Mayport
