= A Perfect Circle discography =

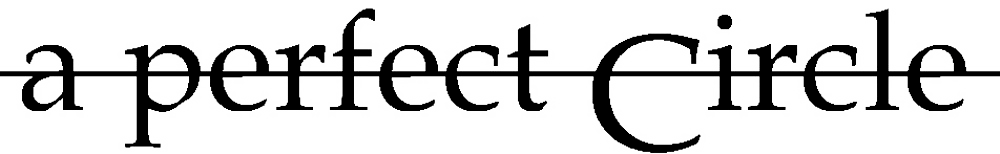
- A Perfect Circle logo
- Studio albums: 4
- Extended plays: 1
- Compilation albums: 2
- Singles: 16
- Video albums: 1
- Music videos: 14
- Promotional singles: 1

The discography of American alternative rock supergroup A Perfect Circle consists of four studio albums, two compilation albums, one extended play, one video album, thirteen singles, one promotional single and thirteen music videos. A Perfect Circle is the brainchild of Billy Howerdel. After hearing demos of Howerdel's music, Maynard James Keenan, the lead singer of Tool, offered his services as vocalist. Howerdel agreed, and the band formed in 1999. They were then joined by bassist/violinist Paz Lenchantin, guitarist Troy Van Leeuwen, formerly of Failure, and drummer Tim Alexander, formerly of Primus. Soon after entering the studio to record their first album, Alexander was replaced by Josh Freese of The Vandals. Mer de Noms was released in May 2000, selling 188,000 copies its debut week. The band embarked on a number of headlining tours all over the world to promote the album which was certified gold by the Recording Industry Association of America (RIAA) one month after its release, and platinum just four months later.

While preparing for their second album, Lenchantin and Van Leeuwen left the band to pursue other projects. They were replaced by bassist Jeordie White (Marilyn Manson) and guitarist Danny Lohner, both of whom had been involved in the production of Mer de Noms and the later Emotive album. Lohner performed only one track on the album before he was replaced by James Iha, formerly of The Smashing Pumpkins. Thirteenth Step was released in September 2003, selling 231,000 copies its debut week. The band followed the release by touring throughout North America, Europe and Japan for the remainder of the year. In 2004, the band continued touring in Australia, Japan, New Zealand and Europe, concluding in the late-spring in the United States. The album was certified gold just six weeks after release, and platinum in March 2006.

The third album, Emotive, was released in November 2004, selling 142,000 copies its debut week. Two weeks later, the band released the DVD-CD set entitled Amotion. The set contains music videos for all eight singles, previously unreleased videos, and nine remixes. Emotive was certified gold five weeks after its release, and Amotion a month after its release.

== Albums ==
=== Studio albums ===
List of studio albums, with selected chart positions, sales figures and certifications
Title	Album details	Peak chart positions										Sales	Certifications
Title	Album details	US	AUS	CAN	FRA	GER	NLD	NZ	NOR	SWE	UK	Sales	Certifications
Mer de Noms	Released: May 23, 2000 (US); Label: Virgin; Formats: CD, CS, LP, digital download	4	2	5	—	55	81	2	32	54	55	US: 1,888,000	RIAA: Platinum; ARIA: Gold; BPI: Silver; MC: Platinum
Thirteenth Step	Released: September 16, 2003 (US); Label: Virgin; Formats: CD, CS, LP, digital download	2	3	1	41	11	17	1	7	17	37	US: 1,181,000	RIAA: Platinum; ARIA: Gold; BPI: Silver; MC: Gold; RIANZ: Gold
Emotive	Released: November 2, 2004 (US); Label: Virgin; Formats: CD, CS, LP, digital download	2	8	5	61	33	46	2	18	—	80	US: 671,000	RIAA: Gold; MC: Gold
Eat the Elephant	Released: April 20, 2018; Label: BMG; Formats: CD, LP, digital download	3	2	3	18	2	12	3	8	18	12	US: 94,000 (as of June 2018)	
"—" denotes a recording that did not chart or was not released in that territory.

=== Compilation albums ===
List of compilation albums, with selected chart positions
Title	Album details	Peak chart positions			
Title	Album details	US	US Alt.	US Rock	UK Rock
Amotion	Released: November 16, 2004 (US); Label: Virgin; Formats: CD, digital download	57	—	—	—
Three Sixty	Released: November 19, 2013 (US); Label: Virgin; Formats: CD, digital download	38	7	13	32
A Perfect Circle Live: Featuring Stone and Echo	Released: November 26, 2013 (US); Label: A Perfect Circle; Formats: CD and DVD box set, digital download	—	—	—	—
"—" denotes a recording that did not chart or was not released in that territory.

=== Live albums ===
Title	Album details
Cinquanta: A 50th Birthday Celebration For Maynard James Keenan – Live (with Puscifer and Failure)	Released: March 22, 2024 (US); Formats: CD, LP

=== Video albums ===
List of video albums, with selected chart positions and certifications
Title	Album details	Peak chart positions		Certifications
Title	Album details	US Video	AUS DVD	Certifications
Amotion	Released: November 16, 2004 (US); Label: Virgin; Formats: DVD	4	10	RIAA: Platinum; MC: Gold

== Extended plays ==
List of extended plays
Title	EP details
Deep Cuts	Released: April 7, 2009 (US); Label: Virgin; Formats: Digital download

== Singles ==
List of singles, with selected chart positions, showing year released and album name
Title	Year	Peak chart positions										Album
Title	Year	US	US Alt.	US Main. Rock	US Rock	AUS	CAN	CAN Alt.	NLD	NZ	UK	Album
"Judith"	2000	— (Note: "Judith" did not enter the Billboard Hot 100, but peaked at number five on the Bubbling Under Hot 100 Singles chart.)	5	4	—	25	—	15	—	34	153	Mer de Noms
"3 Libras"	2000	—	12	12	—	—	—	—	—	—	49	Mer de Noms
"The Hollow"	2001	—	17	14	—	49	—	—	—	—	72	Mer de Noms
"Weak and Powerless"	2003	61	1	1	—	—	17	—	—	—	—	Thirteenth Step
"The Outsider"	2003	79	5	3	—	—	—	—	69	—	—	Thirteenth Step
"Blue"	2004	—	21	19	—	—	—	—	—	—	—	Thirteenth Step
"Imagine"	2004	—	26	26	—	—	—	—	—	—	—	Emotive
"Passive"	2005	—	14	14	—	—	—	—	—	—	—	Emotive
"By and Down"	2013	—	—	8	— (Note: "By and Down" did not enter the Hot Rock Songs chart, but peaked at number 26 on the Rock Airplay chart.)	—	—	—	—	—	—	Three Sixty
"The Doomed"	2017	—	—	16	19	—	—	—	—	—	—	Eat the Elephant
"Disillusioned"	2018	—	—	—	21	—	—	—	—	—	—	Eat the Elephant
"TalkTalk"	2018	—	—	17	28	—	—	—	—	—	—	Eat the Elephant
"So Long, and Thanks for All the Fish"	2018	—	—	27	43	—	—	—	—	—	— (Note: "So Long, and Thanks for All the Fish" did not enter the UK Singles Chart, but peaked at number 12 on the UK Physical Singles Chart.)	Eat the Elephant
"Kindred"	2024	—	—	—	—	—	—	—	—	—	—	Sessanta E.P.P.P.
"Starless"	2026	—	—	1	— (Note: "Starless" did not enter the Billboard Rock & Alternative Songs chart, but peaked at number four at the Rock Digital Song Sales chart.)	—	—	—	—	—	—	Non-album singles
"To Whom It May Concern"	2026	—	—	—	—	—	—	—	—	—	—	Non-album singles
"—" denotes a recording that did not chart or was not released in that territory.

=== Promotional singles ===
List of promotional singles, showing year released and album name
Title	Year	Album
"Counting Bodies Like Sheep to the Rhythm of the War Drums"	2004	Emotive

== Music videos ==
List of music videos, showing year released and directors
Title	Year	Director(s)
"Judith"	2000	David Fincher
"3 Libras"	2001	Paul Hunter
"Thinking of You"	2002	Steven Grasse
"Weak and Powerless"	2003	The Brothers Strause
"The Outsider"	2004	Steven Grasse
"Blue"	2004	Joseph Perez
"Counting Bodies Like Sheep to the Rhythm of the War Drums"	2004	Nick Paparone, Paul Thiel, Steven Grasse
"Imagine"	2004	Gerald Casale
"Passive"	2005	The Brothers Strause
"By and Down" (live)	2013	Adam Rothlein
"The Doomed"	2017	Jeremy Danger, Travis Shinn
"Disillusioned"	2018	Alex Howard
"So Long, and Thanks for All the Fish"	2018	Kyle Cogan
"Starless"	2026	Jon Vulpine, Justin Jones (filming); Jake Johnston (editor)

== See also ==
- List of songs recorded by A Perfect Circle
