= List of songs recorded by A Perfect Circle =

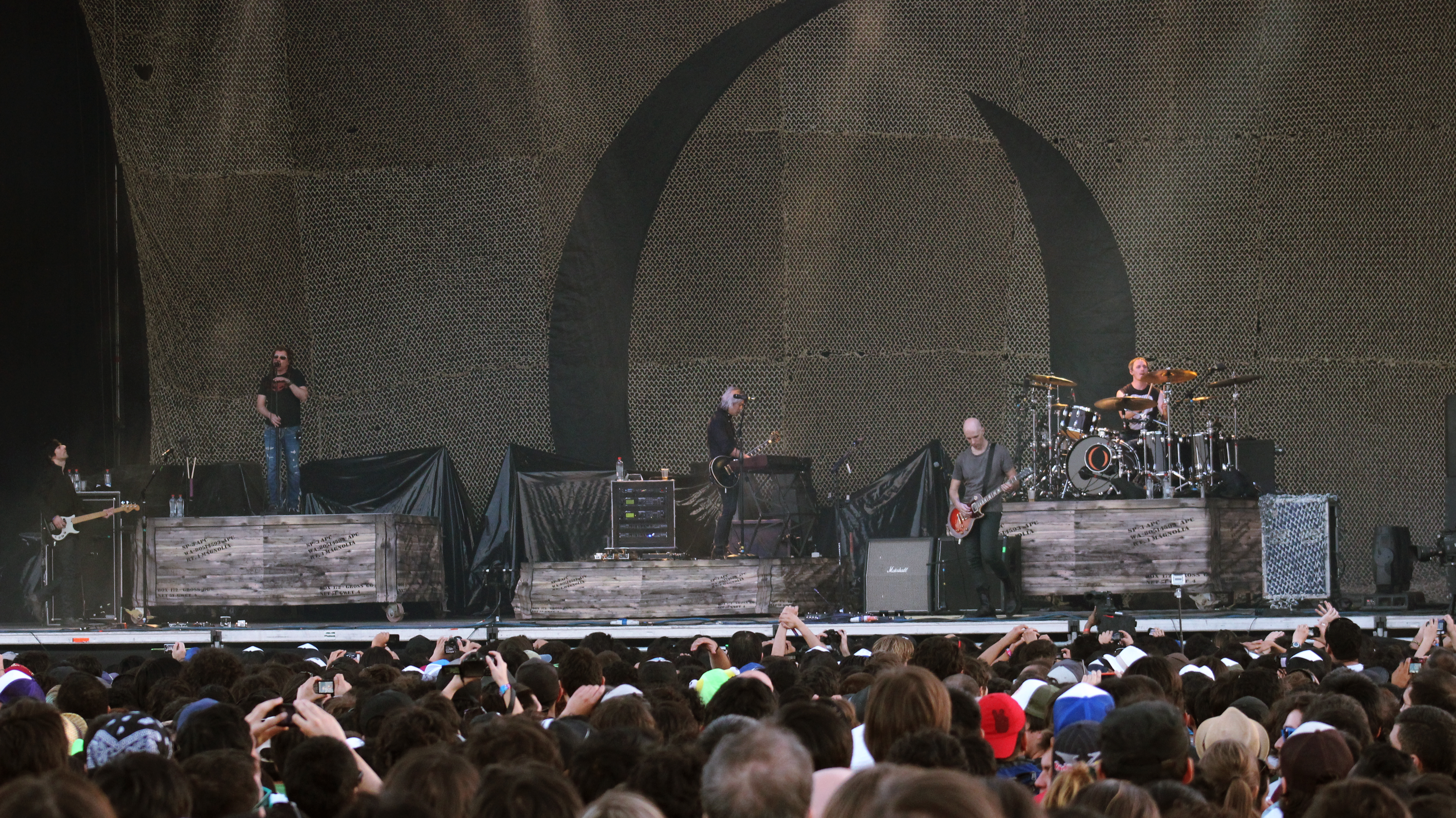
A Perfect Circle performing at Lollapalooza Chile in 2013.

American rock supergroup A Perfect Circle has recorded material for four studio albums. The band's music is mostly written by the band's two core members and founders, guitarist Billy Howerdel and Tool vocalist Maynard James Keenan, the former writing the music, and the latter writing the lyrics and vocal melodies. However, due to the commitments of its participants, band membership has fluctuated over time, leading recordings to vary when it comes to performance credits. The original incarnation of the band included Paz Lenchantin on bass, Troy Van Leeuwen on guitar, and Josh Freese on drums; though Primus drummer Tim Alexander had briefly stood in as a drummer prior to Freese in the band's initial live shows prior to releasing any material. Band collaborator and producer Danny Lohner and Marilyn Manson bassist Jeordie White were also members for a short period in the early 2000s. The band's current lineup features former Smashing Pumpkins guitarist James Iha, bassist Matt McJunkins, and drummer Jeff Friedl, the latter two also being contributors to Keenan's Puscifer and Howerdel's Ashes Divide projects.

After forming in 1999, the band released their debut album, Mer de Noms in 2000, featuring three singles, "Judith", "The Hollow", and "3 Libras", all of which hit the top 20 of both the Billboard US Modern Rock and Mainstream Rock charts, and helped propel the album to platinum sales four months after release. A follow-up album, Thirteenth Step, was released in 2003, featured the band's best performing songs: "Weak and Powerless" topped the Mainstream and Modern Rock charts, "The Outsider", hit the top five in both, and both crossed over onto the all-format Billboard Hot 100 chart, at number 61 and 79 respectively. A third single, "Blue", also hit the top 20 of the Mainstream Rock chart. Initially planning to enter a hiatus after the second album, they stuck together to release a third album, a collection of radically re-worked, politically-motivated cover songs titled Emotive in time for the 2004 United States presidential election. Two singles came from the release, a cover of John Lennon's "Imagine" and "Passive", a song originating from the cancelled Tapeworm project with Trent Reznor of Nine Inch Nails.

After entering a hiatus in 2005, band activity was sporadic in the coming years. The band reformed in 2010, but would not release any new songs until 2013, with the single release of "By and Down" for their greatest hits album Three Sixty. After another period of inactivity, the band recorded a fourth studio album, Eat the Elephant, released on April 20, 2018. For the release, the band worked with an outside music producer, Dave Sardy, for the first time.

The large variations in composition and sound of the band's recorded material has led to them being described as many different sub-genres of rock and metal music, though critics generally agree that the band has been a major influence on modern rock. Reviewers from outlets such as AllMusic and Rolling Stone cited their work as rare examples of relevance and quality in contemporary rock music. with Music OMH even asserting that the band had "literally defined alternative rock as we know it."

== Songs ==
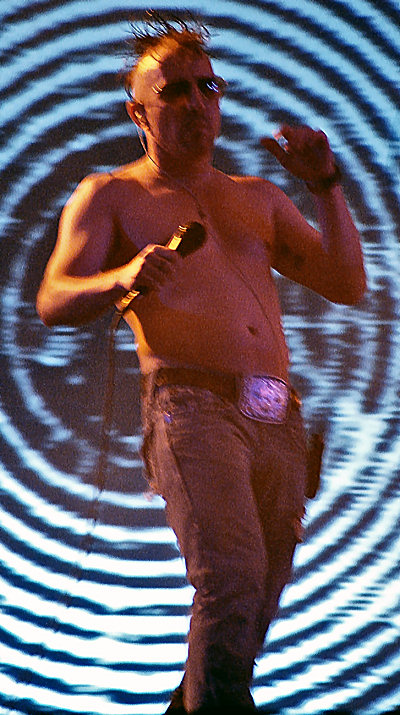
Maynard James Keenan, the band's co-founder and primary lyricist, who balances his time between the band and Tool.

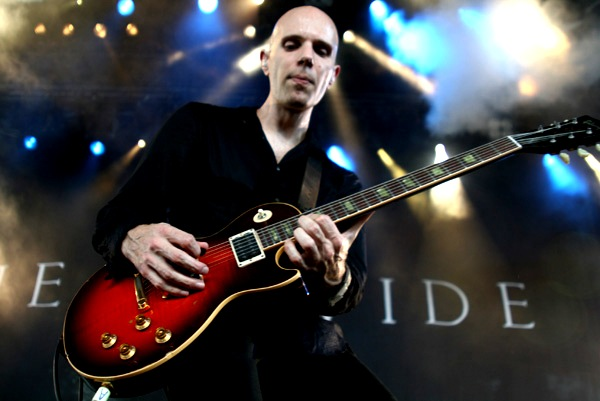
Billy Howerdel, the band's co-founder, guitarist and main core member.

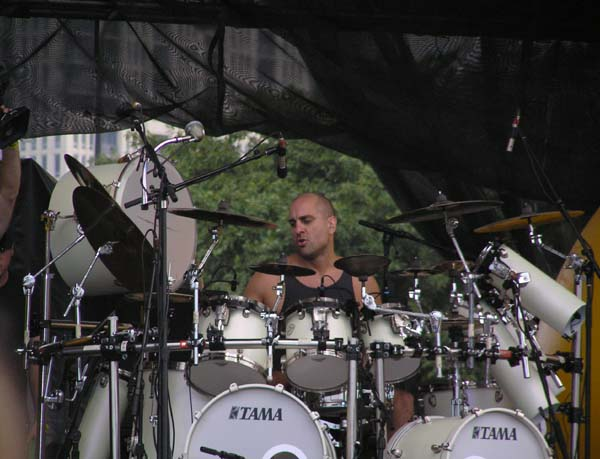
Drummer Tim Alexander toured with the band in 1999, but only had one studio contribution, The Hollow

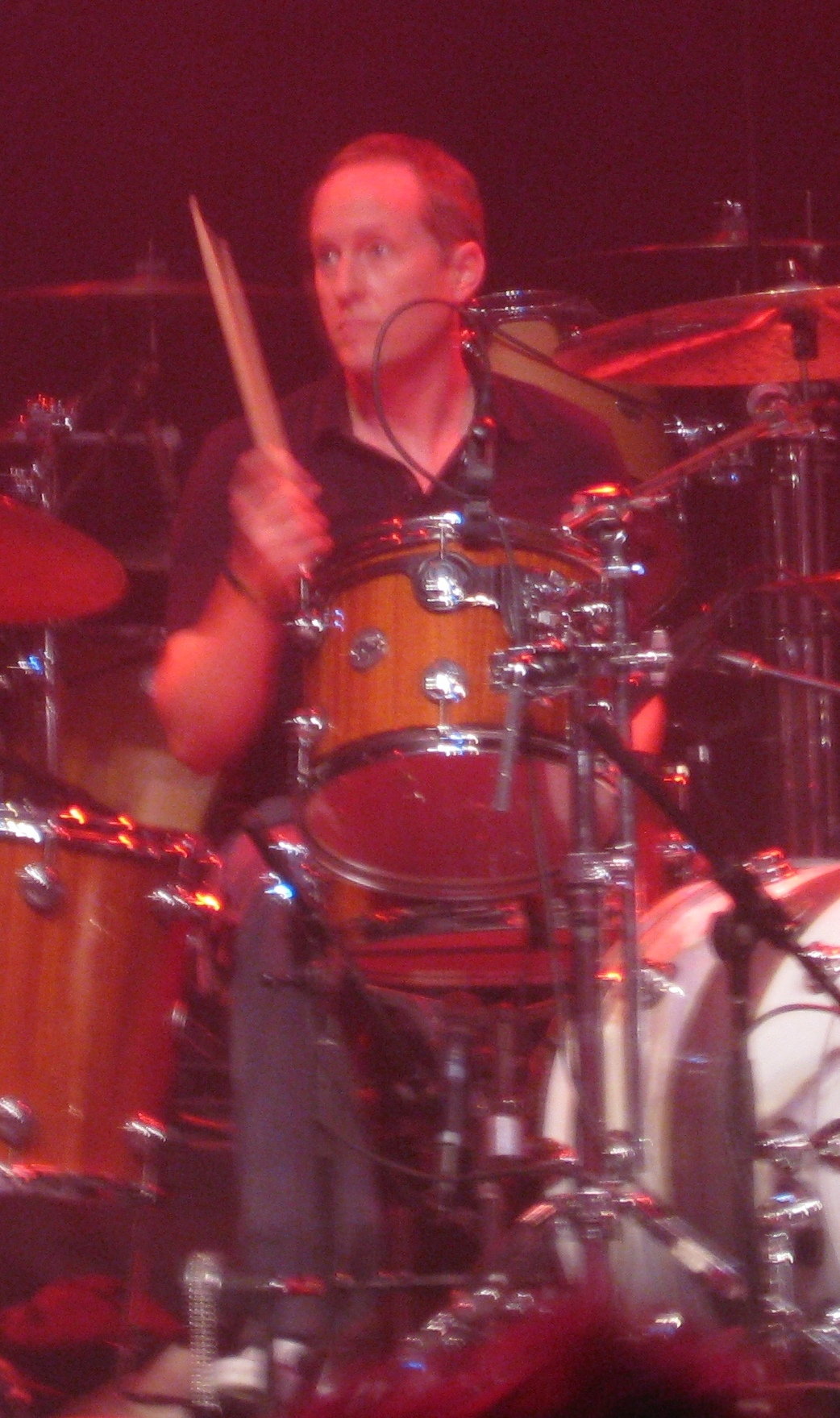
Josh Freese, contributing almost all drum tracks for the band until 2011.

Name of song, featured performers, writers, originating album, and year released.
Song	Performer(s)	Writer(s)	Album	Year	Ref(s).
"3 Libras"	Vocals: Maynard James Keenan; Guitar, Bass: Billy Howerdel; Violin: Paz Lenchantin; Viola: Luciano Lenchantin; Drums: Josh Freese	Maynard James Keenan; Billy Howerdel	Mer de Noms	2000	
"A Stranger"	Vocals: Maynard James Keenan; Guitar, Backing Vocals: Billy Howerdel; Bass: Jeordie White; Strings: The Section Quartet	Maynard James Keenan; Billy Howerdel	Thirteenth Step	2003	
"Annihilation" (Crucifix cover)	Vocals: Maynard James Keenan; Guitar, Piano, Keyboard, Programming: Billy Howerdel; Keyboard, Programming: Danny Lohner	Original: Christopher Douglas, Matthew Borruso, Sothira Pheng; Rearrangement: Maynard James Keenan; Billy Howerdel	Emotive	2004	
"Ashes to Ashes" (David Bowie cover)	Vocals: Maynard James Keenan; Guitar, Backing Vocals: Billy Howerdel; Guitar: James Iha; Bass: Matt McJunkins; Drums: Josh Freese	Original: David Bowie; Rearrangement: Maynard James Keenan; Billy Howerdel	A Perfect Circle Live: Featuring Stone and Echo	2013	
"Blue"	Vocals: Maynard James Keenan; Guitar, Backing Vocals: Billy Howerdel; Bass: Jeordie White; Drums: Josh Freese	Maynard James Keenan; Billy Howerdel	Thirteenth Step	2003	
"Breña"	Vocals: Maynard James Keenan; Guitar, Bass, Backing Vocals: Billy Howerdel; Drums: Josh Freese	Maynard James Keenan; Billy Howerdel	Mer de Noms	2000	
"By and Down"	Vocals: Maynard James Keenan; Guitar, Piano, Backing Vocals: Billy Howerdel; Bass: Matt McJunkins; Drums: Jeff Friedl	Maynard James Keenan; Billy Howerdel	Three Sixty	2013	
"By and Down the River"	Vocals: Maynard James Keenan; Guitar, Keyboard: Billy Howerdel; Bass: Matt McJunkins; Drums: Jeff Friedl	Maynard James Keenan; Billy Howerdel	Eat the Elephant	2018	
"The Contrarian"	Vocals: Maynard James Keenan; Guitar, Bass, Keyboard: Billy Howerdel; Drums: Jeff Friedl	Maynard James Keenan; Billy Howerdel	Eat the Elephant	2018	
"Counting Bodies Like Sheep to the Rhythm of the War Drums"	Vocals: Maynard James Keenan; Backing Vocals: Billy Howerdel; Backing Vocals, Additional Instrumentation: Danny Lohner; Drums, Electric Piano: Josh Eustis; Saxophone: Jason Freese	Maynard James Keenan, Billy Howerdel, Arrangement: Danny Lohner, Keenan	Emotive	2004	
"Crimes"	Vocals: Maynard James Keenan; Guitar: Billy Howerdel; Bass: Jeordie White; Drums: Josh Freese	Maynard James Keenan; Billy Howerdel; Josh Freese; Jeordie White	Thirteenth Step	2003	
"Delicious"	Vocals: Maynard James Keenan; Guitar, Bass, Keyboard: Billy Howerdel; Drums: Jeff Friedl	Maynard James Keenan; Billy Howerdel	Eat the Elephant	2018	
"Diary of a Love Song" (Ozzy Osbourne/The Cure cover)	Vocals: Maynard James Keenan; Guitar, Backing Vocals: Billy Howerdel; Guitar: James Iha; Bass: Matt McJunkins; Drums: Josh Freese	Original: Ozzy Osbourne, Randy Rhoads, Bob Daisley and Lee Kerslake, Robert Smith; Rearrangement: Maynard James Keenan; Billy Howerdel	A Perfect Circle Live: Featuring Stone and Echo	2013	
"Disillusioned"	Vocals: Maynard James Keenan; Guitar, Bass, Keyboard: Billy Howerdel; Drums: Jeff Friedl	Maynard James Keenan; Billy Howerdel	Eat the Elephant	2018	
"DLB"	Piano: Billy Howerdel	Maynard James Keenan; Billy Howerdel	Eat the Elephant	2018	
“Dog Eat Dog”	Vocals: Maynard James Keenan; Guitar, Bass: Billy Howerdel; Drums: Jeff Friedl	Angus Young, Malcolm Young, Bon Scott	“So Long, and Thanks for All the Fish” single	2018	
"The Doomed"	Vocals: Maynard James Keenan; Guitar, Bass, Keyboard: Billy Howerdel; Drums: Jeff Friedl	Maynard James Keenan; Billy Howerdel	Eat the Elephant	2018	
"Eat the Elephant"	Vocals: Maynard James Keenan; Guitar, Bass, Keyboard: Billy Howerdel; Drums: Jeff Friedl	Maynard James Keenan; Billy Howerdel	Eat the Elephant	2018	
"Feathers"	Vocals: Maynard James Keenan; Guitar, Keyboard: Billy Howerdel; Bass: Matt McJunkins; Drums: Jeff Friedl	Maynard James Keenan; Billy Howerdel	Eat the Elephant	2018	
"Fiddle and the Drum" (Joni Mitchell cover)	Vocals: Maynard James Keenan	Original: Joni Mitchell; Rearrangement: Maynard James Keenan	Emotive	2004	
"Freedom of Choice" (Devo cover)	Vocals, Guitar, Bass: Billy Howerdel; Backing vocals: Maynard James Keenan, Drums: Josh Freese	Original: Gerald V. Casale, Mark Mothersbaugh; Rearrangement: Billy Howerdel	Emotive	2004	
"Get the Lead Out"	Vocals: Maynard James Keenan; Guitar, Bass, Keyboard: Billy Howerdel; Drums: Jeff Friedl	Maynard James Keenan; Billy Howerdel	Eat the Elephant	2018	
"Gimmie, Gimmie, Gimmie" (Black Flag cover)	Vocals: Maynard James Keenan; Guitar, Harmonium Billy Howerdel; Bass, Backing Vocals: Danny Lohner; Drums: Josh Freese	Original: Greg Ginn; Rearrangement: Maynard James Keenan	Emotive	2004	
Gravity"	Vocals: Maynard James Keenan; Guitar, Backing Vocals: Billy Howerdel; Guitar: Troy Van Leeuwen; Bass: Jeordie White; Drums: Josh Freese	Maynard James Keenan; Billy Howerdel; Josh Freese; Troy Van Leeuwen; Paz Lenchantin	Thirteenth Step	2003	
"The Hollow"	Vocals: Maynard James Keenan; Guitar, Bass, Backing Vocals: Billy Howerdel; Drums: Tim Alexander	Maynard James Keenan; Billy Howerdel	Mer de Noms	2000	
"Hourglass"	Vocals: Maynard James Keenan; Guitar, Bass, Keyboard: Billy Howerdel; Drums: Jeff Friedl	Maynard James Keenan; Billy Howerdel	Eat the Elephant	2018	
"Imagine" (John Lennon cover)	Vocals, Piano: Maynard James Keenan; Guitar, Bass, Backing Vocals: Billy Howerdel; Piano, Strings: Paz Lenchantin; Drums: Josh Freese	Original: John Lennon; Rearrangement: Maynard James Keenan	Emotive	2004	
"Judith"	Vocals: Maynard James Keenan; Guitar, Bass, Backing Vocals: Billy Howerdel; Backing Vocals: Paz Lenchantin; Drums: Josh Freese	Maynard James Keenan; Billy Howerdel	Mer de Noms	2000	
"Kindred"	Vocals: Maynard James Keenan; Guitar, Bass, Backing Vocals: Billy Howerdel; Drums: Josh Freese	Maynard James Keenan; Billy Howerdel	Sessanta E.P.P.P.	2024	
"Let's Have a War" (Fear cover)	Vocals: Maynard James Keenan; Guitar, Bass: Danny Lohner; Drums: Josh Freese	Original: Lee Ving, Philo Cramer; Rearrangement: Maynard James Keenan	Emotive	2004	
"Lullaby"	Vocals: Jarboe, Maynard James Keenan; Guitar: Billy Howerdel; Bass: Jeordie White; Drums: Josh Freese	Maynard James Keenan; Billy Howerdel	Thirteenth Step	2003	
"Magdalena"	Vocals: Maynard James Keenan; Guitar, Bass: Billy Howerdel; Drums: Josh Freese	Maynard James Keenan; Billy Howerdel	Mer de Noms	2000	
"The Noose"	Vocals: Maynard James Keenan; Backing Vocals: Jarboe; Guitar, Backing Vocals: Billy Howerdel; Guitar: Danny Lohner; Bass: Jeordie White; Drums: Josh Freese	Maynard James Keenan; Billy Howerdel	Thirteenth Step	2003	
"The Nurse Who Loved Me" (Failure cover)	Vocals: Maynard James Keenan; Strings: The Section Quartet	Greg Edwards, Ken Andrews; Instrumentation: Jon Brion, K. Patrick Warren	Thirteenth Step	2003	
"Orestes"	Vocals: Maynard James Keenan; Guitar, Bass, Keyboards, Backing Vocals: Billy Howerdel; Backing Vocals: Paz Lenchantin; Drums: Josh Freese	Maynard James Keenan; Billy Howerdel	Mer de Noms	2000	
"Orestes" (demo) (Note: Completely different recording from the regular "Orestes". Instead of a full band arrangement with Maynard James Keenan on vocals, it's merely an acoustic recording of the song done entirely by Billy Howerdel.)	Vocals, Guitar: Billy Howerdel	Billy Howerdel	Mer de Noms (Japanese release bonus track)	2000	
"The Outsider"	Vocals: Maynard James Keenan; Guitar, Backing Vocals: Billy Howerdel; Bass: Jeordie White; Drums: Josh Freese	Maynard James Keenan; Billy Howerdel	Thirteenth Step	2003	
"Over"	Vocals, Kalimba: Maynard James Keenan; Piano: Billy Howerdel	Maynard James Keenan; Billy Howerdel	Mer de Noms	2000	
"The Package"	Vocals: Maynard James Keenan; Guitar, Backing Vocals: Billy Howerdel; Guitar: Troy Van Leeuwen; Bass: Jeordie White; Drums: Josh Freese	Maynard James Keenan; Billy Howerdel	Thirteenth Step	2003	
"Passive" (recording of "Vacant" by Tapeworm)	Vocals: Maynard James Keenan; Guitar, Backing Vocals: Billy Howerdel; Guitar, Bass: Danny Lohner Drums: Josh Freese; Piano: Paz Lenchantin	Danny Lohner, Maynard James Keenan, Trent Reznor, Billy Howerdel	Emotive	2004	
"Peace, Love, and Understanding" (Nick Lowe cover)	Vocals, Guitar, Bass, Programming: Billy Howerdel; Strings: Paz Lenchantin; Drums: Josh Freese; Programming: Charlie Clouser	Original: Nick Lowe; Rearrangement: Billy Howerdel	Emotive	2004	
"People Are People" (Depeche Mode cover)	Vocals, Keyboards, Programming: Billy Howerdel; Backing vocals: Maynard James Keenan, Danny Lohner; Guitar, Keyboards, Programming: James Iha; Bass: Jeordie White; Drums: Josh Freese	Original: Martin Gore; Rearrangement: Billy Howerdel	Emotive	2004	
"Pet"	Vocals: Maynard James Keenan; Backing Vocals: Devo Keenan; Guitar, Backing Vocals: Billy Howerdel; Bass, Backing Vocals: Jeordie White; Drums, Backing Vocals: Josh Freese	Maynard James Keenan; Billy Howerdel	Thirteenth Step	2003	
"Renholdër"	Vocals: Maynard James Keenan; Vocals: Kelli Shafer; Vocals, Guitar, Piano: Billy Howerdel; Vocals, Violin: Paz Lenchantin; Drums, Percussion: Josh Freese	Maynard James Keenan; Billy Howerdel	Mer de Noms	2000	
"Rose"	Vocals: Maynard James Keenan; Guitar, Bass: Billy Howerdel; Violin: Paz Lenchantin; Drums: Josh Freese	Maynard James Keenan; Billy Howerdel; Strings Arrangement: Paz Lenchantin	Mer de Noms	2000	
"Sleeping Beauty"	Vocals: Maynard James Keenan; Guitar: Billy Howerdel; Guitar (outro): Troy Van Leeuwen; Bass: Paz Lenchantin; Drums: Josh Freese	Maynard James Keenan; Billy Howerdel	Mer de Noms	2000	
"So Long, and Thanks for All the Fish"	Vocals: Maynard James Keenan; Guitar, Bass, Keyboard: Billy Howerdel; Drums: Jeff Friedl; Strings Arrangement: Dave Sardy	Maynard James Keenan; Billy Howerdel	Eat the Elephant	2018	
"Starless"	Vocals: Maynard James Keenan; Guitar, Bass: Billy Howerdel; Drums: Josh Freese	Maynard James Keenan; Billy Howerdel	Single	2026	
"TalkTalk"	Vocals: Maynard James Keenan; Guitar, Bass, Keyboard: Billy Howerdel; Drums: Jeff Friedl	Maynard James Keenan; Billy Howerdel	Eat the Elephant	2018	
"Thomas"	Vocals: Maynard James Keenan; Guitar, Bass, Programming: Billy Howerdel; Drums: Josh Freese; Percussion: Draven Godwin	Maynard James Keenan; Billy Howerdel	Mer de Noms	2000	
"Thinking of You"	Vocals: Maynard James Keenan; Backing Vocals, Guitar, Bass, Programming: Billy Howerdel; Guitar (outro): Troy Van Leeuwen; Drums: Josh Freese	Maynard James Keenan; Billy Howerdel	Mer de Noms	2000	
"To Whom It May Concern"	Vocals: Maynard James Keenan Backing Vocals, Guitar, Bass: Billy Howerdel Drums: Josh Freese	Maynard James Keenan Billy Howerdel	Single	2026	
"Vanishing"	Vocals: Maynard James Keenan; Guitar, Backing Vocals: Billy Howerdel; Guitar: Troy Van Leeuwen; Bass: Jeordie White; Drums: Josh Freese	Maynard James Keenan; Billy Howerdel	Thirteenth Step	2003	
"Weak and Powerless"	Vocals: Maynard James Keenan; Guitar, Backing Vocals: Billy Howerdel; Bass: Jeordie White; Drums: Josh Freese	Maynard James Keenan; Billy Howerdel	Thirteenth Step	2003	
"What's Going On" (Marvin Gaye cover)	Vocals: Maynard James Keenan; Vocals, Guitar, Bass: Billy Howerdel; Drums: Josh Freese; Programming: Charlie Clouser	Original: Marvin Gaye, Alfred Cleveland, Renaldo Benson; Rearrangement: Danny Lohner	Emotive	2004	
"When the Levee Breaks" (Kansas Joe McCoy & Memphis Minnie/Led Zeppelin cover)	Vocals: Maynard James Keenan; Guitar, Bass: Billy Howerdel; Piano: Paz Lenchantin; Drums: Josh Freese	Original: Kansas Joe McCoy & Memphis Minnie; Rearrangement: Maynard James Keenan, Billy Howerdel	Emotive	2004	
