= A Perfect Circle Live: Featuring Stone and Echo =

Box set by A Perfect Circle
- Released: November 26, 2013
- Recorded: 2010; August 2, 2011, Red Rocks Amphitheatre, Morrison, Colorado, United States
- Label: A Perfect Circle Entertainment

A Perfect Circle chronology
Three Sixty (2013)	A Perfect Circle Live: Featuring Stone and Echo (2013)	Eat the Elephant (2018)

A Perfect Circle Live: Featuring Stone and Echo is a live box set by American rock supergroup, A Perfect Circle. It was released via the band's own label, A Perfect Circle Entertainment, on November 26, 2013, a week after the release of the band's greatest hits album, Three Sixty.

== Content ==
The box set collectively includes five audio CDs and a DVD. Three of the CDs are grouped together as Trifecta - live recordings of the band's first three studio albums, Mer de Noms (2000), Thirteenth Step (2003) and eMOTIVe (2004), - performed in their entirety during the band's 2010 series of "three-night, full-album performances." The other two CDs, grouped together as Stone and Echo consist of the band's full-length performance on August 2, 2011, at the Red Rocks Amphitheatre in Morrison, Colorado. The DVD consists of video footage of the performances found on these two CDs. The live performances of "By and Down", "Ashes to Ashes" and "Diary of a Love Song" were released as bonus tracks.

Other items featured in the box set include:

- A custom made media book containing artwork and credits
- A custom sculpted resin frame designed by the band
- Five hand-selected lithographs featuring the signatures of the band's vocalist Maynard James Keenan and guitarist Billy Howerdel
- A custom made guitar pick designed by Billy Howerdel

== Track listing ==
All tracks are written by Billy Howerdel and Maynard James Keenan, except where noted.

Trifecta CD 1: Mer de Noms Live
No.	Title	Writer(s)	Length
1.	"The Hollow"		3:06
2.	"Magdalena"		4:11
3.	"Rose"		3:28
4.	"Judith"		4:19
5.	"Orestes"		5:37
6.	"3 Libras"		6:17
7.	"Sleeping Beauty"		6:12
8.	"Thomas"		3:50
9.	"Renholdër"		3:20
10.	"Thinking of You"		4:32
11.	"Breña"		4:13
12.	"Over"		6:46
13.	"Ashes to Ashes" (David Bowie cover)	David Bowie	3:59

Trifecta CD 2: Thirteenth Step Live
No.	Title	Writer(s)	Length
1.	"The Package"		8:25
2.	"Weak and Powerless"		3:23
3.	"The Noose"		5:26
4.	"Blue"		4:26
5.	"Vanishing"		5:25
6.	"A Stranger"		3:11
7.	"The Outsider"		4:11
8.	"Crimes"	Howerdel/Keenan/Freese/White	2:01
9.	"The Nurse Who Loved Me" (Failure cover)	Greg Edwards/Ken Andrews	5:26
10.	"Pet"		4:36
11.	"Lullaby"		4:28
12.	"Gravity" (Howerdel/Keenan/Freese/Van Leeuwen/Lenchantin)		9:21

Trifecta CD 3: eMOTIVe Live
No.	Title	Writer(s)	Length
1.	"Annihilation" (Crucifix cover)		2:25
2.	"Imagine" (John Lennon cover)		4:57
3.	"Peace, Love, and Understanding" (Brinsley Schwarz cover)		5:20
4.	"What's Going On" (Marvin Gaye cover)		5:02
5.	"Passive"	Lohner / Keenan / Reznor / Howerdel	4:14
6.	"Gimmie Gimmie Gimmie" (Black Flag cover)		4:55
7.	"People Are People" (Depeche Mode cover)		3:48
8.	"Freedom of Choice" (Devo cover)		3:26
9.	"Let's Have a War" (Fear cover)		3:39
10.	"Counting Bodies Like Sheep to the Rhythm of the War Drums"		6:02
11.	"When the Levee Breaks" (Memphis Minnie & Kansas Joe McCoy cover)		7:03
12.	"Fiddle and the Drum" (Joni Mitchell cover)		4:21
13.	"Diary of a Lovesong" (Ozzy Osbourne / The Cure mashup; listed in liner notes between tracks 7 & 8)		14:59

Stone and Echo (2 CDs, 1 DVD)
No.	Title	Writer(s)	Length
1.	"Annihilation" (Crucifix cover)	Sothira Pheng, Jake Smith, Matt Borruso, Chris Douglas	2:15
2.	"Imagine" (John Lennon cover)	John Lennon	4:55
3.	"Weak and Powerless"		3:15
4.	"The Hollow"
5.	"Rose"
6.	"Blue"
7.	"What's Going On" (Marvin Gaye cover)	Al Cleveland, Renaldo Benson, Marvin Gaye
8.	"People Are People" (Depeche Mode cover)	Martin Gore
9.	"The Outsider"		4:09
10.	"Peace Love and Understanding" (Brinsley Schwarz cover)	Nick Lowe
11.	"When the Levee Breaks" (Kansas Joe McCoy & Memphis Minnie cover)	Kansas Joe McCoy, Minnie Lawlers
12.	"The Noose"
13.	"3 Libras (All Main Courses Mix)"
14.	"The Package"
15.	"Gimmie Gimmie Gimmie" (Black Flag cover)	Greg Ginn
16.	"Orestes"
17.	"Passive"	Lohner / Keenan / Reznor / Howerdel	4:09
18.	"Counting Bodies Like Sheep to the Rhythm of the War Drums"
19.	"Fiddle and the Drum" (Joni Mitchell cover)	Joni Mitchell
20.	"By and Down"		5:34

== Personnel ==
- Maynard James Keenan – lead vocals
- Billy Howerdel – lead and rhythm guitars, backing vocals
- James Iha – rhythm guitars, keyboards, backing vocals
- Matt McJunkins – bass, backing vocals
- Jeff Friedl – drums on Stone and Echo show (2011)
- Josh Freese – drums on Trifecta shows (2010)
