= The Contrarian =

Song by A Perfect Circle

from the album Eat the Elephant
- Released: June 11, 2018
- Recorded: 2017–2018
- Genre: Art rock
- Length: 3:58
- Label: BMG
- Songwriters: Maynard James Keenan; Billy Howerdel
- Producer: Dave Sardy

"The Contrarian" is a song by American rock band A Perfect Circle. It is off of the band's fourth studio album, Eat the Elephant.

== Background ==
Despite years of slow progress in writing and finalizing content for their 2018 Eat the Elephant, their first album in fourteen years, "The Contrarian" came from a particularly productive 36-hour session in 2017. The band's approach to writing songs is typically guitarist Billy Howerdel writing instrumental demos and presents them to vocalist Maynard James Keenan to write lyrics and vocal melodies on if he approves of the material; the instrumental by Howerdel in the case of "The Contrarian" was based around a very short, undeveloped idea by Howerdel, and was much more so written around Keenan's vocals instead. The song's guitar work was inspired by Howerdel's live performance reworking of their Thirteenth Step track "The Noose", with Howerdel wants to present the sound in a studio track because it wasn't present in the studio version of "The Noose". Some of the rough ideas of the song, much like the song "The Doomed", also originated from Howerdel's work on the soundtrack for the film D-Love.

A video was released for the song on June 11, 2018. The video features footage from the 3D holographic video released with the deluxe box-set edition of the album, compressed into a 2D image, similar to how the band had done with their single "TalkTalk". The video was directed by Steven Sebring. The video features a number of abstract and eerie images, including magicians, puppeteers and octopuses. Revolver noted that the puppeteer in the video bore "an uncanny resemblance to president Donald Trump".

== Themes and composition ==
The song opens with the plucking of a harp, before breaking into rhythm track of bass guitar, piano, and a simple drum beat. Keenan croons melodic vocals throughout the song, opening with the line "'Hello', he lied". At the midpoint and end of the song, Howerdel interjects with a wall of sound, echo-laden guitar interlude. AllMusic described the songs sound as similar to the work of Depeche Mode and Nine Inch Nails. Lyrically, the song alludes to the corruption and dishonesty of politicians, with lines such as "Core is black as pitch / Soul is out of tune / Advocate of none".

== Personnel ==
- Maynard James Keenan – vocals
- Billy Howerdel – guitar, bass, keyboard,
- Jeff Friedl – drums
