= So Long, and Thanks for All the Fish (A Perfect Circle song) =

Single by A Perfect Circle

Single by A Perfect Circle

from the album Eat the Elephant
- B-side: "Dog Eat Dog"
- Released: April 15, 2018
- Recorded: 2017
- Genre: Art rock
- Length: 4:24
- Label: BMG
- Songwriters: Maynard James Keenan; Billy Howerdel
- Producer: Dave Sardy

A Perfect Circle singles chronology
"TalkTalk" (2018)	"So Long, and Thanks for All the Fish" (2018)	"Kindred" (2024)

"So Long, and Thanks for All the Fish" is a song by American rock band A Perfect Circle. It was released on April 15, 2018, as their fourth single off their album Eat the Elephant. The song's title is taken from the Douglas Adams book So Long, and Thanks for All the Fish, the fourth book in his The Hitchhiker's Guide to the Galaxy series, which in turn comes from a quote from the first book The Hitchhiker's Guide to the Galaxy.

== Background and composition ==
The song was released as the fourth single from Eat the Elephant, after "The Doomed", "Disillusioned", and "TalkTalk". The song debuted on April 15, 2018, on BBC Radio 1, five days prior to the release of Eat the Elephant. The song's music was originally written by guitarist Billy Howerdel, and intended for his solo project, Ashes Divide. However, he often presents music intended for Ashes Divide to band frontman Maynard James Keenan to see if he has interest in writing lyrics and vocal harmonies for songs to become A Perfect Circle material instead; Keenan chose to use the song because he felt that "People are going to hate me for this one, so let's do that". A limited-edition version of the single was released for Record Store Day on November 23, 2018, which also contained a studio recording of their cover of AC/DC's song "Dog Eat Dog".

The music video released on November 8, 2018, was directed by Kyle Cogan. Maynard summed up the concept as "Welcome to the new normal". Shot in black and white it begins with a voice-over from a United States civil defense film about atomic explosions before going into a mock commercial. The scenes set in a traditional 1950s landscape of suburban homes and white picket fences become increasingly more disturbing before they culminate in a nuclear holocaust, embellished with footage from the 1955 Operation Cue nuclear tests.

== Themes and composition ==
The song's name comes from the name of the fourth book in Douglas Adams's The Hitchhiker's Guide to the Galaxy series, So Long, and Thanks for All the Fish, though the song's lyrics touches more on the subject of the deaths of celebrities. The song makes allusions to many celebrity deaths in 2016, including Gene Wilder (known for his role as Willy Wonka), David Bowie, Muhammad Ali, Prince, and Carrie Fisher. In writing the lyrics, Keenan stated that he was inspired by the sarcastic nature of the R.E.M. song "It's the End of the World as We Know It (And I Feel Fine)". Lyrically, the song was described by Revolver as "[poking] fun at the absurdity of modern existence." Keenan stated of the song:

"We all cope with the absurd in our own manner. The Italian side of me produces and shares wine with friends in order to feel grounded and connected in the midst of all the madness. But once the wine is gone, the drunk and sarcastic Irish side of me goes straight for the unreasonable jugular."

Musically, Spin described the song as "an orchestral power-rocker of sorts, alternating sunnier, almost glam-like chord progressions with more traditional hard rock gestures". The song was written in major key, and features a more upbeat tempo than most songs by the band. The song features driving percussion, dark guitar parts, and strings.

== Reception ==
Metal Injection praised the song, comparing it favorably to "Disillusioned" and concluding that it was "a bit of an earworm, as by the end of the track I found myself singing the hook". Louder Sound named the song one of the ten Key songs done by Keenan and Howerdel throughout their careers, just one day after the song's release.

== Personnel ==
Credits adapted from CD liner notes.

Band

- Maynard James Keenan – lead vocals
- Billy Howerdel – guitar, bass, keyboards
- Jeff Friedl – drums

Production

- Dave Sardy – production, string arrangement

== Charts ==
Chart (2018)	Peak position
US Hot Rock & Alternative Songs (Billboard)	43
