= Kindred (song) =

Single by A Perfect Circle

from the album Sessanta E.P.P.P.
- Released: March 29, 2024
- Recorded: 2024
- Genre: Progressive rock; experimental rock
- Length: 4:49
- Songwriters: Maynard James Keenan; Billy Howerdel
- Producers: Maynard James Keenan; Billy Howerdel

A Perfect Circle singles chronology
"So Long, and Thanks for All the Fish" (2018)	"Kindred" (2024)	"Starless" (2026)

"Kindred" is a song by American rock band A Perfect Circle. It was released on March 29, 2024, and was the band's first new music in six years, following 2018's Eat the Elephant.

== Background ==
Following the completion of the band's fourth studio album, Eat the Elephant, and subsequent touring cycle in 2018, A Perfect Circle went inactive while members moved onto their respective musical projects. Frontman Maynard James Keenan resumed work with Puscifer, while guitarist Billy Howerdel put out a solo album, What Normal Was (2022). In 2023, a brief tour in celebration of Keenan's 60th birthday was announced. Scheduled to run across April and May 2024, it would feature performances from three bands: A Perfect Circle, Puscifer, and Primus. In the month leading up to the tour's start, it was announced that a joint EP would be released just before the tour, featuring one song from each band. The track from A Perfect Circle, "Kindred", was released on March 29, 2024.

The song features Keenan on vocals, Howerdel on guitars, and Josh Freese on drums. It is the first recording to feature Freese in 13 years, following his departure from the band during its infrequent activity across the early and mid 2010s. Freese was scheduled to perform on the first half of the tour dates, before returning to his work with the Foo Fighters.

"Kindred" was co-written and co-produced by Keenan and Howerdel. Howerdel noted that it came together much faster than much of the band's earlier work. While the two often work and rework songs for months at a time, "Kindred" was quickly recorded and was performed live for the first time on March 19, 2024—only 2 days prior to its official announcement. Howerdel mentioned that its quick development had made it a challenge to prepare for live performance, compared to the band's usual songwriting process.

== Themes and composition ==
Revolver described the song's sound as a "glacial, majestic bit of progressive gloomscaping" featuring "piano-and-symphony-string ambiance and percussively-anchored riffage". Lyrically, the song describes feelings of lamenting the loss of connection to others.

== Personnel ==
- Maynard James Keenan – vocals, production
- Billy Howerdel – guitars, bass, keyboards, production
- Josh Freese – drums
