= Starless (A Perfect Circle song) =

Single by A Perfect Circle
- Released: May 27, 2026
- Recorded: 2026
- Length: 4:33
- Songwriters: Maynard James Keenan, Billy Howerdel
- Producer: Billy Howerdel

A Perfect Circle singles chronology
"Kindred" (2024)	"Starless" (2026)	"To Whom It May Concern" (2026)

"Starless" is a song by American rock band A Perfect Circle. It is their second non-album single to be released since 2018's Eat the Elephant, following "Kindred" in 2024. It peaked at number 1 on the Billboard Mainstream Rock Airplay chart in October 2026.

== Background ==
Despite the band often spending many years writing and changing the song, "Starless" was written in early 2026 and released on May 27, 2026. The song was released as a single, the band's first since 2024" "Kindred". The song was written by vocalist Maynard James Keenan and guitarist Billy Howerdel, and features drumming by Josh Freese, alongside Keenan's and Howerdel's performances. The song did not receive a formal music video, but was released with a music visualizer. The song was released in promotion to the band's then-upcoming UK tour, their first tour in the area in eight years.

The song's May release lead to speculation to the band releasing future music; the month following its release, Howerdel confirmed that the band was working on a new album, though did not confirm any other released details, including whether or not "Starless" would be on the future album. The song peaked at number 1 on the Billboard Mainstream Rock Airplay chart dated October 3, 2026, making it their most popular song on the chart in over 2 decades, and making it their second number one on the chart following "Weak and Powerless".

== Themes and composition ==
Publications noted that the song sounded similar to the band's earlier work. NME described the song as "move[ing] between gritty, guitar-driven riffs and ethereal, heartfelt moments of tenderness. Revolver interpreted the song's lyrics to be about questioning the immorality of modern authority figures.

== Reception ==
Revolver called the song the best new song of the week upon its release, praising Keenan's vocal delivery and Freese's drumming.

== Personnel ==
Credits

Band

- Maynard James Keenan – vocals,
- Billy Howerdel – guitars, bass
- Josh Freese – drums

Production

- Billy Howerdel – production
- Matty Green – mixing

== Charts ==
Chart (2026)	Peak position
US Mainstream Rock (Billboard)	1
US Rock & Alternative Airplay (Billboard)	12
