= Crucifix (band) =

American hardcore punk band

- Origin: Berkeley, California, United States
- Genres: D-beat, hardcore punk, anarcho-punk
- Years active: 1980–1984
- Label: Corpus Christi
- Past members: Sothira Pheng; Jaycee Frances Schmith; Bryce Kanights; Matt Borruso; Christopher Douglas; Drew Bernstein; Jake Smith

Crucifix was an American hardcore punk band from the San Francisco Bay Area, active from 1980 to 1984. They were among the most popular acts of the San Francisco punk scene of the early 1980s. Fronted by Cambodia-born singer Sothira Pheng, Crucifix were distinct among American underground bands for their strong D-beat musical characteristics and anarchist lyrical content and graphic design. The band's debut 1983 full-length album Dehumanization on Crass Records‘ offshoot Corpus Christi Records, is considered by many critics and fans to be a cornerstone of political punk music. After their breakup, Crucifix’s members went on to form the bands Loudspeaker and Proudflesh.

== Band history ==
Crucifix was formed by three members of Subsidized Mess, a short-lived band from Berkeley, California comprising vocalist Christopher Douglas, guitarist Matt Borruso, and Cambodia-born bassist Sothira Pheng. His family had fled their homeland when the Khmer Rouge seized power. The band reconfigured themselves and changed their name to Crucifix with Pheng switching to vocals, Douglas taking over the drums, and Borruso sticking to guitar for the time being while Bryce Kanights joined on bass guitar. This lineup recorded the band’s eponymous five-song debut 12” EP, released by Berkeley-based label Universal Records in 1981.

By the following year, Kanights departed from the band and with the addition of Jaycee Frances Schmith on guitar, Borruso moved over to playing bass for the recording of the band’s second EP, a three-song 7” entitled nineteen eighty-four, released in 1982 on Crucifix’s own label, Freak Records.

Schmith then parted ways with Crucifix to be replaced by guitarist Jake Smith for the recording of what would be the band's only full-length LP, Dehumanization, released by Crass Records imprint Corpus Christi Records in 1983. This album proved a landmark effort for the band and is widely regarded to be their definitive work as well as a cornerstone of American political punk.

After Dehumanization’s release, Smith left the band and was replaced by former America's Hardcore guitarist Drew Bernstein. After lengthy tours of the United States, Canada, and Europe, Crucifix called it quits on July 13, 1984. A posthumous compilation album of singles and live tracks entitled Exhibit A would later be released on Kustomized Records in 1997. When Corpus Christi eventually folded, their album Dehumanization was reissued on CD by Southern Records and later Kustomized on LP, CD, and streaming formats.

== Post-Crucifix projects ==
Matt Borruso and Christopher Douglas (appearing in credits as Christopher Faith) launched an industrial music project called Loudspeaker and released a 12” single on Flux of Pink Indians’ One Little Indian record label in the UK. The duo later moved to New York City and reconfigured as a noise rock band with various musicians who had played in Pussy Galore, Boss Hog, The Normals, Chrome Cranks, Circle X, Dustdevils, Drunk Tank, and Walldrug. Loudspeaker released several more recordings between 1990 and 1996 through Sympathy for the Record Industry and other labels.

Sothira Pheng picked up the bass again and did double-duty as vocalist in San Francisco punk/hard rock trio Proudflesh with ex-Crucifix guitarist Jaycee Frances Schmith. Proudflesh released the three-song Power Broker EP in 1988, which would later be included on the compilation The Rise and Fall along with all of Crucifix’s early material. Two decades later, Proudflesh released their sole full-length album, a self-titled 2006 CD on Wired Gnome Records.

== Legacy ==
"Annihilation", the opening track from Crucifix’s Dehumanization LP, has been adopted by several other musicians in the years since the album’s release. Brazilian death metal band Sepultura covered the song and featured it as a bonus track on their album Nation in 2001. The song was also recorded in 2004 by A Perfect Circle for their third LP, eMOTIVe, and the band Orbital used vocal samples from “Annihilation“ for their own song, "Choice".

== Members ==
- Sothira Pheng (Vocals)
- Jaycee Frances Schmith (Guitar)
- Bryce Kanights (Bass on Self-titled EP)
- Matt Borruso (Bass)
- Christopher Douglas (Drums)
- Drew Bernstein (Guitar)
- Jake Smith (Guitar)

== Discography ==
- 1981: Crucifix (12" EP, Universal Records)
- 1982: Nineteen Eighty-Four (7" single, Freak Records)
- 1983: Dehumanization (album, Corpus Christi Records)
  - CD released in 1995 by Southern Records
  - LP/CD/streaming reissue in 2021 by Kustomized Records
- 1997: Exhibit A (LP/CD compilation album, Kustomized Records)

=== Compilation appearances ===
- Rat Music for Rat People, Vol. 1 (CD Presents, 1982)
- Not So Quiet On The Western Front (Alternative Tentacles, 1982)
