= A Perfect Circle =

American rock supergroup

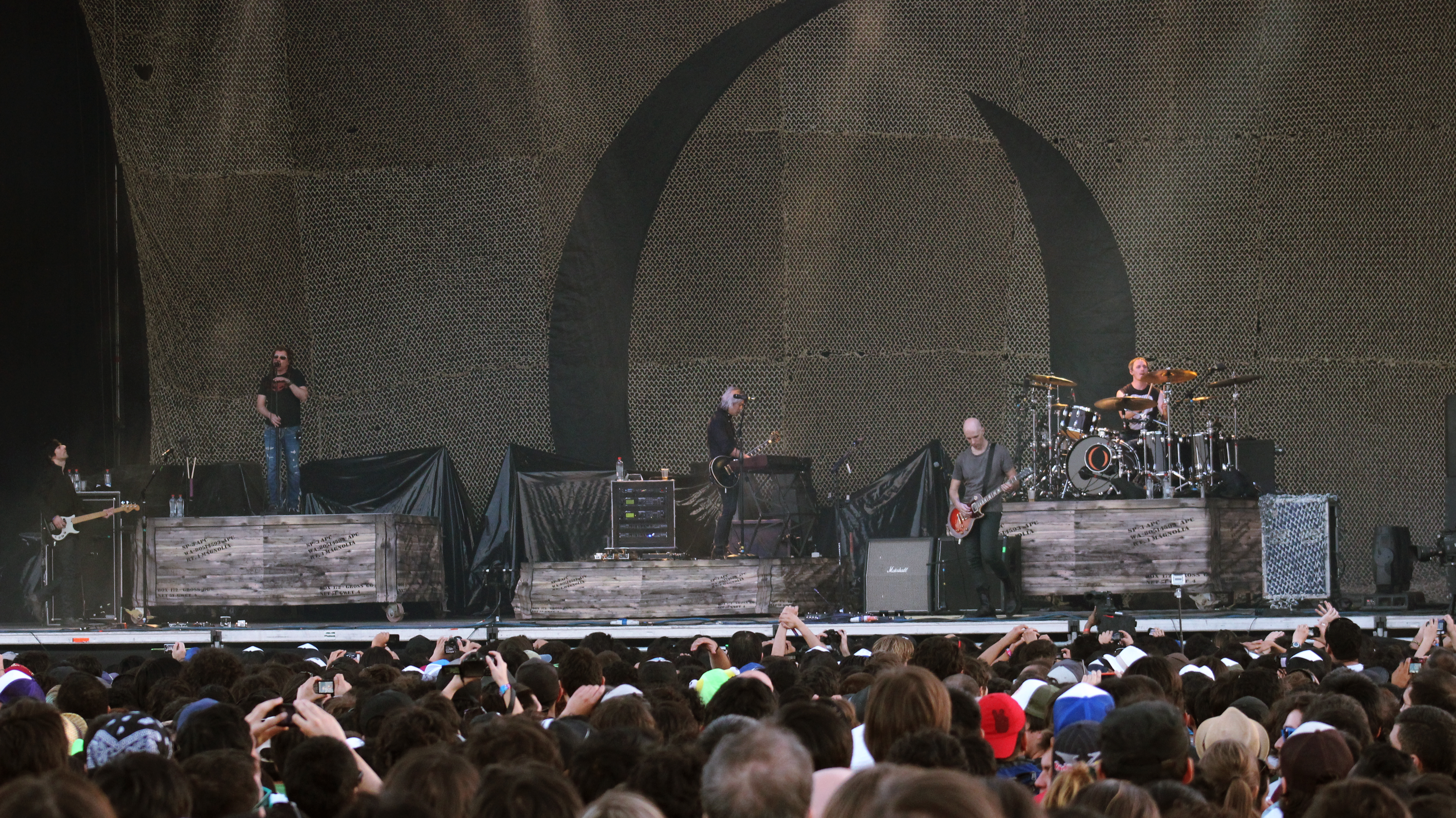
- A Perfect Circle performing at Lollapalooza Chile in 2013

Background information
- Origin: Los Angeles, California, U.S.
- Genres: Alternative rock; art rock; alternative metal; hard rock
- Years active: 1999–2004; 2010–present
- Labels: Virgin; BMG
- Members: Maynard James Keenan; Billy Howerdel; Josh Freese; James Iha; Matt McJunkins
- Past members: Tim Alexander; Troy Van Leeuwen; Paz Lenchantin; Danny Lohner; Jeordie White; Jeff Friedl
- Website: aperfectcircle.com

A Perfect Circle is an American rock supergroup formed in Los Angeles, California, in 1999 by guitarist Billy Howerdel and Tool vocalist Maynard James Keenan. A Perfect Circle released three of their four studio albums in the early 2000s: their debut Mer de Noms in 2000; a follow-up, Thirteenth Step, in 2003; and an album of radically re-worked cover songs, Emotive, in 2004. Shortly after Emotive's release, the band went on hiatus; Keenan returned to Tool and started up solo work under the band name Puscifer, while Howerdel released a solo album, Keep Telling Myself It's Alright, under the moniker Ashes Divide. Band activity was sporadic in the following years; the band reformed in 2010, and played live shows on and off between 2010 and 2013, but fell into inactivity after the release of their greatest hits album, Three Sixty, and a live album box set, A Perfect Circle Live: Featuring Stone and Echo in late 2013. The band reformed in 2017 to record a fourth album, Eat the Elephant, which was released in 2018. After spending the rest of the year touring in support of the album, the band fell into inactivity until 2024. After a few years of sparse touring and song releases, the band announced major touring plans for 2027, alongside plans for future music releases as well.

Prone to downtime due to Keenan's other musical commitments, the band has featured a variety of musicians throughout alternating periods of activity and inactivity, and has changed line-ups on each album, leaving Keenan and Howerdel the only constant members. The original incarnation of the band included Paz Lenchantin on bass, Troy Van Leeuwen on guitar, and Tim Alexander on drums. Alexander, however, only performed a handful of live shows and appeared on one song on the group's debut album before being replaced by Josh Freese. Band collaborator and producer Danny Lohner and bassist Jeordie White were also members for a short period in the early 2000s. The band's current lineup features Smashing Pumpkins guitarist James Iha, bassist Matt McJunkins, and drummer Josh Freese, the latter two also being contributors to the related Puscifer and Ashes Divide projects. Despite the varied cast and numerous lineup changes, the primary roles of creating A Perfect Circle's songs has remained consistent with Howerdel as music composer and Keenan writing lyrics and vocal melodies. The band's studio albums have been generally well received critically and commercially, with their first three studio albums selling 4 million copies collectively as of 2005.

== History ==
=== Formation and Mer de Noms (1999–2000) ===
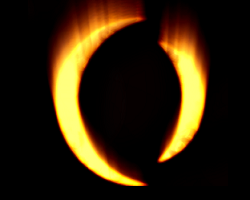
A Perfect Circle logo

A Perfect Circle was originally conceived by Billy Howerdel, a former guitar technician for Nine Inch Nails, the Smashing Pumpkins, Fishbone and Tool. Howerdel met singer Maynard James Keenan in 1992, when Tool was opening for Fishbone, and the two became friends. Three years later, Keenan offered Howerdel, who was looking for lodging, a room in his North Hollywood home. This provided Howerdel the opportunity to play demos of his music for Keenan. Pleased with what he heard, Keenan remarked, "I can hear myself singing [those songs]." Howerdel originally wanted Cocteau Twins lead singer Elizabeth Fraser to be A Perfect Circle's vocalist, but she was unavailable. Howerdel agreed that Keenan would be a good fit, and A Perfect Circle was formed a short time later. The two rounded out the band's initial lineup with bassist and violinist Paz Lenchantin, former Failure guitarist Troy Van Leeuwen, and Primus drummer Tim Alexander. The band played their first show in Los Angeles at the Viper Club Reception in August 1999 followed by a performance at the Coachella Festival that October, by which time Alexander had been replaced by Josh Freese, who worked with Howerdel on Guns N' Roses recording sessions that would later lead to the album Chinese Democracy. While initially in talks to release the album on Volcano Records – Tool's record label – Keenan stated that they instead chose to go with Virgin Records, who Keenan felt better understood that Keenan meant for the band to be an equally important band to Tool, not a minor side project. After the initial shows and securing a record deal, the band entered the studio to begin work on their first album.

I designed the original logo of a symbol, which outwardly looks like a larger and smaller crescent, but actually holds two perfect circles. I designed the logo purposefully to represent Maynard [James Keenan] and me. I thought the logo represented "3 Libras" with its line, "You don't see me at all." I related to the song – feeling like there's a lot to offer, but invisible. Millions suffer with that feeling every day. You can stare at something for so long before you see it in a new light. The insight from something you discover on your own always means more ... the APC logo has two perfect circles in there; they're just hard to see.

— Billy Howerdel, on the band's logo.

The band's debut album, Mer de Noms (French for "Sea of Names"), was released on May 23, 2000. The album was well-received commercially and critically. It debuted at number four on the Billboard 200, selling 188,000 copies in its first week and making it the highest-selling debut album for a rock band. Mer de Noms was later certified platinum by the RIAA, indicating 1 million copies sold, on October 31, 2000. The release earned the band the "Best Debut Album" award from the California Music Awards. In the album review by Rolling Stone, Pat Blashill wrote that Keenan "added an almost operatic angst to Howerdel's songs" and concluded that "A Perfect Circle sound like a desperate dream of what rock used to be. Maybe that's the point." AllMusic's review expressed that "there's little question that the addicting combination of Keenan's aching voice and Howerdel's accomplished songs and production skills made for one of 2000's best splashes in whatever was left of 'modern rock'."

Promotions began shortly after recording for the album was finished. Initially, they served as the opening act for Nine Inch Nails on the 2000 Fragility v2.0 tour, but subsequently embarked on a number of headlining tours all over the world, touring for around eight months straight. In public appearances with the group, Keenan often wore wigs, carrying over a practice begun with Tool of wearing costumes in order to maintain anonymity in his private life. The album produced three singles as well: "Judith", "3 Libras", and "The Hollow", the latter of which featured Alexander's sole studio contribution to the band. All three performed well commercially; peaking at fourth, twelfth, and fourteenth on the Billboard Mainstream Rock chart respectively.

=== Thirteenth Step (2001–2003) ===
Activity began slowing down for the band by late 2000, with Keenan returning to Tool to finish the recording of what would be their next album, Lateralus. Keenan returned to A Perfect Circle to tour from January to March 2001, until returning to Tool again for the rest of 2001 to release and tour in support of Lateralus. Initial plans were for Howerdel to collaborate long-distance on writing new A Perfect Circle material with Keenan while he toured with Tool, by sending ideas back and forth to one another, though Keenan found it too difficult to balance both, eventually lessening his role while he focused on Tool. Efforts continued through mid-2002, with Howerdel primarily focusing on writing new material while sporadically working with Van Leeuwen, Lenchantin, and Freese. By June 2002, Van Leeuwen estimated that about 80% of the instrumental material was completed while they waited for Keenan's return. However, lineup changes and disagreements on the album's direction would lead to the album not being released for over a year. Both Lenchantin and Van Leeuwen had been working on solo material during the band's downtime, and then moved on to join other bands. Lenchantin would leave to join Billy Corgan's new start-up band Zwan in April 2002, while Van Leeuwen began touring with Queens of the Stone Age shortly after. Ex-Marilyn Manson bassist Jeordie White, formerly known as Twiggy Ramirez, replaced Lenchantin on bass in January 2003. Shortly after, Van Leeuwen permanently left the band, and long-time band collaborator Danny Lohner filled in temporarily as the second guitarist for wrapping up the album.

Keenan rejoined the sessions in early 2003, and the music began taking a different direction with the new lineup and Keenan's influence. Beyond the new personnel, the dynamic had changed: With Mer de Noms, Howerdel had already written and finalized all of the music, with Keenan just contributing the lyrics and vocals. This time around, Keenan was more active in vetoing or altering musical ideas, determined to make something different than just another hard rock album, in fear of it being redundant. Sessions became tense, with Howerdel preferring the heavier compositions written while waiting for Keenan to return to the band, and sometimes taking offense to Keenan's suggested mellower rearrangements. White would play the role of a mediator between the two; being newer to the band helped him provide an outsider's perspective, helping them to find common ground. The band released their second album, Thirteenth Step, on September 16, 2003. The album debuted even higher than Mer de Noms, charting at number 2 in its opening week and selling over 233,000 copies. The album, and its accompanying new sound, fared well critically as well. The AllMusic review praised the band's new sound, describing it as "moodier, tenser, and more atmospheric (if that is possible) recording than its predecessor ... The wide dynamic swathes that were so prominent on the band's debut are all but absent here. The squalling guitars have taken a backseat to carefully crafted melodies where atmospherics are maximized and pulled taut over the listener. While not a radical departure from Mer de Noms, there is a real progression here.... Lyrically, musically, sonically, the Thirteenth Step is proof positive that mainstream rock has plenty of life and vision left in it."

Touring in support of the album started in the U.S. in July 2003, and ran through the end of the year, with a brief European leg of the tour extending out to Europe with the Deftones in September. Lohner, who could not commit to touring on a full-time permanent basis, was replaced by former The Smashing Pumpkins guitarist James Iha. In January 2004, the group left the country to play shows in Europe, Australia, New Zealand and Japan. They headed back to the U.S. in March and wrapped up touring in June, totaling to about a year straight of touring. Meanwhile, three singles were released from the album: "Weak and Powerless", "The Outsider" and "Blue". "Weak and Powerless" managed to top the Billboard Modern Rock Tracks and Mainstream Rock Songs, while "The Outsider" later peaked in the top 5 of both as well. "Weak and Powerless" and "The Outsider" were also the band's only songs to have substantial cross-over success, charting on the Billboard Hot 100 all-format chart, at 61 and 79 respectively.

=== Emotive (2004) ===
After wrapping up the touring in support of Thirteenth Step in the first half of 2004, the band had announced it planned to enter a long hiatus while Keenan returned to Tool and Howerdel pursued a solo career. In July 2004, Keenan performed at Serj Tankian's (System of a Down) and Tom Morello's (Rage Against the Machine) Axis of Justice concert – an event for musicians to advocate for political and social causes. At the performance, Keenan announced that A Perfect Circle would be releasing a collection of political cover songs. During the beginning of the touring cycle for Thirteenth Step, Howerdel and Keenan discussed potential ideas for a third studio album. An early idea was to record an album of cover songs, though they were initially hesitant, feeling they needed a meaningful reason to warrant doing it. Keenan, who had been very critical of President George W. Bush during the touring cycle, proposed tying the concept together as a political-themed covers album, with Howerdel, while generally apolitical publicly, felt was worth pursuing in their post-September 11th attacks political and social climate. The two put their plans on hold temporarily and decided to move forward on the project as the band's third studio album. Keenan emphasized that, despite his personal feelings on Bush, the album was less of an "anti-Bush" album, and more of an "anti-political apathy" – encouraging people to research things and become more involved.

The band rushed to complete the album in time to release it prior to the 2004 U.S. Presidential Elections in November, just barely a year after their prior release. Recording sessions ran from late June to early September. The sessions, largely the work of Howerdel, Keenan, and Freese, contained contributions from past and present members of the band, including Lenchantin, Lohner, White, and Iha. Keenan, aware of the time constraints and Howerdel's future intentions on doing solo albums, also encouraged Howerdel to contribute lead vocals to about a third of the album. A wide variety of different songs were chosen to be recorded, from Marvin Gaye's "What's Going On" to Led Zeppelin's "When the Levee Breaks". Most songs were radical reinterpretations of the original, sometimes unrecognizable compared to the originals. Howerdel explained that it was done on purpose, to make the songs their own, and conceded that he, as of 2010, still had not even once ever heard the original version of Crucifix's "Annihilation", another song re-recorded for the album. He also stated that some songs had started as original A Perfect Circle songs musically, until the band decided to use the lyrics of other songs over the compositions, in turn converting them into cover songs.

The band's third album, Emotive, was released on November 2, 2004 – the actual U.S. Presidential Election Day. However, the album received a much more polarizing reception than the prior two albums, with some critics and fans not appreciating the band's move into more political content, or the radical liberties they had taken with the album's cover versions. Others accused the band of rushing out a third album in order to fulfill the band's three album contractual obligation to Virgin Records, a claim refuted as false by Howerdel. The album still managed to receive a generally positive reception from critics. Sales were similarly positive, but less so than prior albums. The album debuted at number 2 on the Billboard 200 charts, selling 142,000 copies in its first week – matching Thirteenth Step's peak chart placement, but selling almost 90,000 fewer copies. The album was certified Gold by the RIAA, indicating 500,000 units sold.

The band did not tour in support of the release, instead entering a hiatus shortly after its completion. Two singles were released in support of the album, the first of which was a somber cover of John Lennon's "Imagine" The second single, "Passive", was one of just two original songs on the album, tracing back to writing sessions for Trent Reznor's unreleased Tapeworm project. In the late 1990s, Reznor started the project for songs that did not fit Nine Inch Nails, which eventually grew into a collaborative project with a number of other musicians. One track, "Vacant", featured contributions from Keenan and Lohner in 1999, but with the project hitting development hell due to creative and legal hurdles of many of the participants in the early 2000s, A Perfect Circle began playing the track at live shows. With the project being shelved completely by 2004, Keenan decided to rework the track as "Passive" for Emotive. Additionally, two weeks after the release of the album, on November 16, 2004, the band released the CD/DVD compilation set entitled Amotion. The DVD part contained the music videos for band six singles; while the CD is composed entirely of remixes of the singles from Mer de Noms and Thirteenth Step.

=== Hiatus and other projects (2005–2009) ===
The band entered a hiatus in January 2005, with members turning to their own separate projects. Keenan rejoined Tool to record what would be 2006's 10,000 Days, Howerdel began pursuing a solo career, and the rest joined various other touring or sessions recording roles. The band's fate remained uncertain in the following years. It was referred to as "hiatus or done until further notice" by Howerdel in October 2005, on "life-support" by Keenan in April 2006, and "done for now" by Howerdel in May 2006. Towards the end of 2007, Keenan spoke more optimistically about the band reforming someday, but felt that it would probably be in a more limited capacity – for a tour or a new single release, not another full-length studio album. Keenan explained:

The real problem with running Tool and A Perfect Circle at the same time was they both operate the same way. They're both live touring bands with a label, still working under the old contract mentality. So I thought it was time to let A Perfect Circle go for now and let Billy explore himself. It's tough for a guy who went from being a guitar tech [for Tool] to being in a band with a pretentious, famous singer and having to live in that shadow. It was important for Billy to go and do his own thing and really explore his own sound and let people hear what he has to say and how he would do it on his own, and then we'll get back and do some A Perfect Circle stuff.

— Maynard James Keenan, Revolver, December 2007

During the time, Howerdel continued to work on projects with various past A Perfect Circle members. In 2005, he wrote and composed the soundtrack to Jak X: Combat Racing, collaborating with Van Leeuwen, Lenchantin, and Freese on a number of tracks. Howerdel continued to work on recording a solo album from 2005 through 2007; the sessions were difficult, so he eventually began collaborating with past A Perfect Circle members, including Lohner as a producer, Freese as a drummer, and Lenchantin as a co-writer for a track. The material was eventually released under the name Ashes Divide on the album Keep Telling Myself It's Alright in early 2008. Meanwhile, Keenan had moved on from working with Tool, and started up a solo-project of sorts on his own, called Puscifer, of which he began releasing studio albums for in 2007. Despite both projects going, both Keenan and Howerdel released statements in 2008 that the band was not dead.

=== Reformation, touring, compilation releases (2010–2016) ===
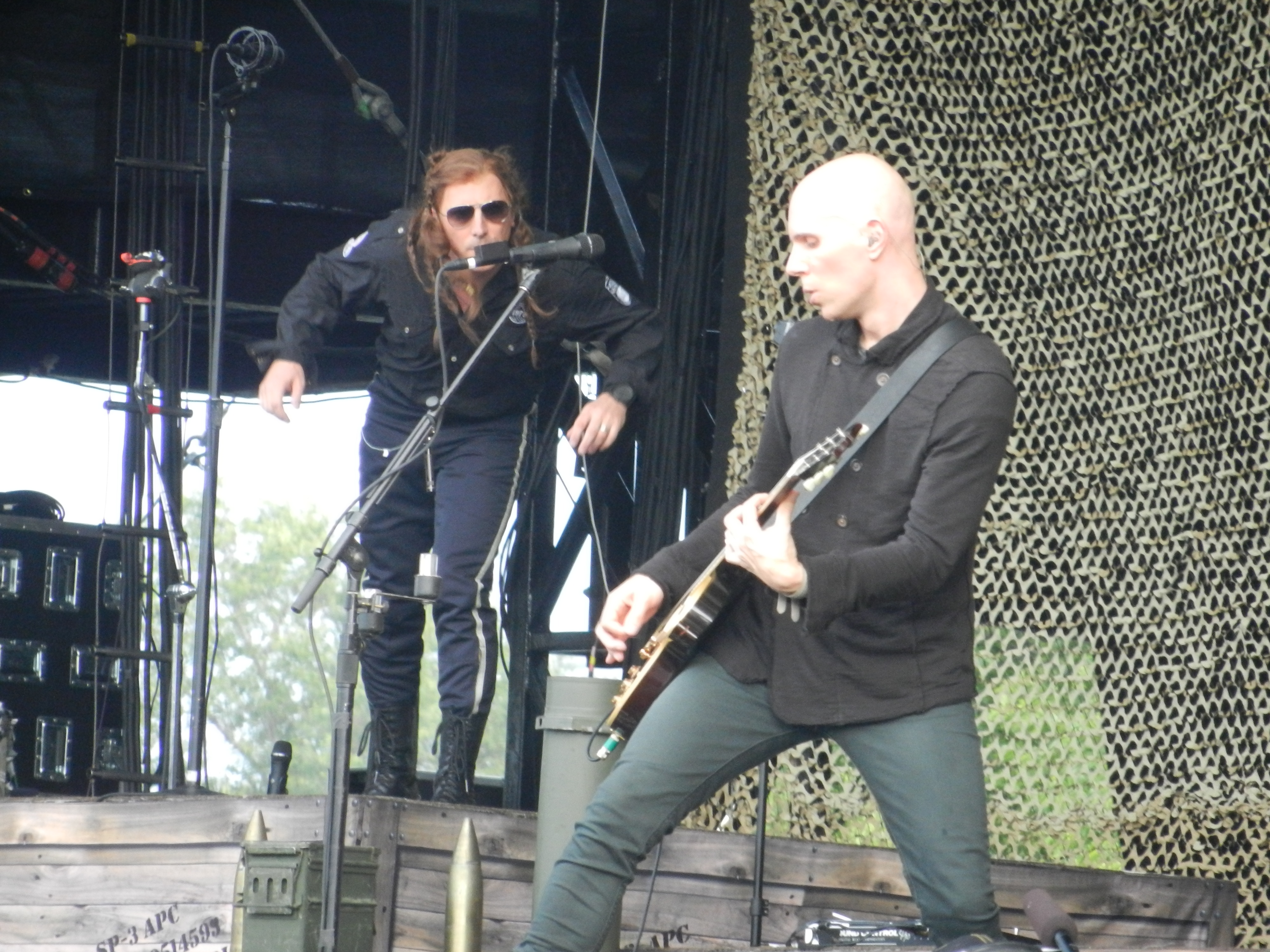
Keenan and Howerdel in 2011.

As early as December 2008, Keenan had mentioned that he and Howerdel had passively and separately been writing new material for A Perfect Circle, although the band would officially remain in hiatus and largely out of the view of the public through mid-2010. The turning point was an unexpected collaboration between Keenan and Howerdel; Keenan was scheduled to perform a rendition of "Bohemian Rhapsody" with Queen guitarist Brian May in June at E3 2010, but May had to cancel at the last minute. In need of a guitarist, and knowing Howerdel was in the area, Keenan reached out, and had Howerdel play guitar for the performance at the last minute. Despite little time to prepare, the performance was a success, and afterwards, both felt more compelled to perform together again.

In September, the band officially announced the end of their hiatus, indicating they would again return to live performances. Keenan, Howerdel, Freese, and Iha all returned to their respective roles, though, with Lenchantin and White unavailable, the band recruited Matt McJunkins, touring bassist for Ashes Divide and Puscifer, to join as bassist. The performances, running through the end of 2010, included traveling to five separate cities for three nights of shows in each city, with each night containing a complete, in-order performance of one of each of their three albums – Mer de Noms, Thirteenth Step, and Emotive – notably being the first time most of the material from the latter had ever been performed live. Throughout the year the band would discuss the prospect of new material, but with uncertainty. Keenan continued to insist that logistics and industry trends made recording another full album unlikely, and that single one-off songs would be more likely. Howerdel noted that he had been writing material and presenting rough demos to Keenan since 2008, but that much of the material was in a state of flux, some being accepted by Keenan as potential A Perfect Circle material, while other being rejected by Keenan, and/or saved by Howerdel for a prospective Ashes Divide release in the future.

The band continued their live performances into 2011, including a North American tour that spanned May through August. Notable events included Rock on the Range, Edgefest, Ottawa Bluesfest, Kanrocksas Music Festival, Lollapalooza, a performance at the Red Rocks Amphitheatre. Freese, who had already committed to drumming for Weezer during the same time-frame, was only able to perform at the opening show, and was replaced by Jeff Friedl for the remainder of the shows, who, like McJunkins, had previously worked with both Ashes Divide and Puscifer. Keenan and Howerdel continued to allude to recording new music, but continued to state that the process was slow, the logistics of money and availability made it difficult, and that a full album was still unlikely, in favor of single songs instead. Only one new song, "By and Down", was performed at the shows. By the end of the year, Keenan revealed that none of the material was ready for release, and that moving into 2012, he and Howerdel were moving back into their respective other projects – Puscifer and Ashes Divide. The band was inactive over the course of 2012, outside of a single live show in December. However, just prior to the show, in October 2012, Freese announced he would be permanently leaving the band, with Friedl becoming his permanent replacement.

The band played a few live shows in early 2013, including Soundwave Music Festival in Australia and Lollapalooza Chile, though Keenan reported that they had still yet to complete any new tracks due to their other commitments. Later in the year, the band announced two separate compilation releases for November 2013. The first, a greatest hits album entitled Three Sixty, containing one new studio recording, "By and Down", and the second, a box set entitled A Perfect Circle Live: Featuring Stone and Echo. The box set contained four CDs of live music: one for each of their three entire-album performances of Mer de Noms, Thirteenth Step, and Emotive done in 2010, collectively dubbed Trifecta, and a recording of their 2011 performance at the Red Rocks Amphitheatre, dubbed Stone and Echo. The set also came with DVD video recording of the 2011 Stone and Echo performance. In promoting the releases, Howerdel commented on future releases once again, stating that he felt they had "75% of the foundation of [the next] A Perfect Circle record ready", though he conceded that they were still without Keenan's lyrics or vocal melodies, and could still change depending on Keenan's reaction to the material. He also conceded that they still disagreed on the release medium; Keenan preferred smaller releases, while Howerdel preferred the format of a full album. Shortly after, the band again fell into a few years of public inactivity, with little occurring outside of Howerdel's 2015 commentary reiterating his commitment to the band, and Keenan's early 2016 commentary reiterating he still hoped to return to the band.

=== Eat the Elephant (2017–2018) ===
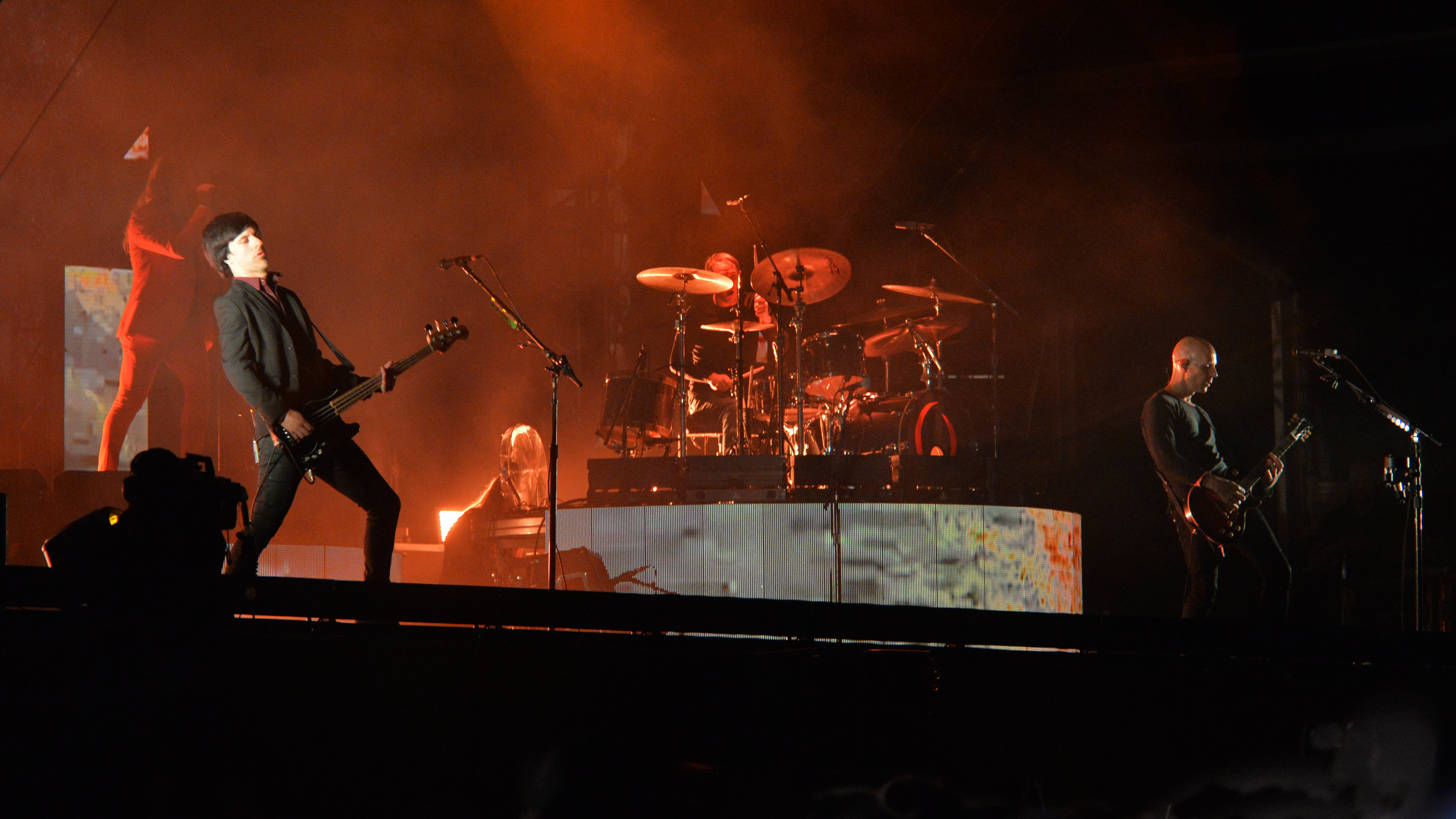
A Perfect Circle performing at Hellfest, France in 2018.

The band became active again in 2017, with the announcement that they would reform to embark on a North American tour in April and May 2017, with the intention of using the live performances of new material as motivation to finish recording the album, similar to how they had embarked on their first 1999 tour to inspire the completion of Mer de Noms. In March, the band announced they had signed a new record contract – their first in thirteen years – to release a fourth full-length studio album through BMG Rights Management. Howerdel initially gave a tentative timeframe of between November 2017 to early 2018 for the new album, while Keenan stated that the album wouldn't be out in 2017. A second North American tour began in October, and runs through December 2017. The band continued to debut new songs during the tours, including the tracks "Feathers" and "Hourglass".

The band's fourth studio album, Eat the Elephant, was released on April 20, 2018. Four singles were released in advance of the album; "The Doomed" in October 2017, "Disillusioned" in January 2018, "TalkTalk" in February 2018 and "So Long, and Thanks for All the Fish" in April 2018. The album marks the first time the band opted to work with an outside music producer: Dave Sardy. Sardy helped Keenan and Howerdel find common ground in musical ideas in the recording process, helping them find a path to move forward in finishing the album. The band toured extensively in 2018 in support of the album, including performances at Rock on the Range and Coachella. In June 2018, the band extended their touring with a new North American leg towards the end of the year, and released a 2D hologram video for the song "The Contrarian". Iha was unavailable to perform in the April through July performances due to his commitment to the Smashing Pumpkin's 2018 reunion, and was temporarily replaced for the live performances by Greg Edwards of Failure, though Iha still remains a member of the band.

=== Future (2019–present) ===
Howerdel noted that he would like to see the band keep active beyond the Eat the Elephant album cycle, but that future activity, as it had historically been, was dependent on Keenan's limited availability and commitments to his other projects. When asked if there would be further albums after Eat the Elephant, in June 2018, Keenan responded "Yeah, there should be". Howerdel was optimistic as well, agreeing that the band "will move forward for sure". In late 2021, Keenan noted that while he still saw a future for A Perfect Circle, that 2022 would be more focused on him working with Puscifer and Howerdel releasing a solo album, What Normal Was. While supporting What Normal Was in 2022, Howerdel reiterated plans to make more A Perfect Circle music someday, noting that it was something he was thinking about and occasionally writing material for, but that there were no concrete plans, nor had he even begun talking to Keenan about it yet.

The band returned to touring in April 2024, alongside a series of shows with Puscifer and Primus. Just prior to its start, the band released their first new song in 6 years - "Kindred". The song was released as part of a three-way split EP, Sessanta E.P.P.P., which contains one song each from A Perfect Circle, Puscifer, and Primus. Freese returned to the band for the first time in 13 years to record drums for the track. He performed drums on some of the tour dates, while Gunnar Olsen of Puscifer filled in when there conflicts with Freese's shows with the Foo Fighters during his short stint with the band. The following year, in May 2026, the band released a second new song, "Starless", ahead of their European and UK tour. Howerdel noted that the band was working towards working on writing and recording further material as well, as time allowed it between touring. On September 29, 2026, the band released a third new song, "To Whom It May Concern", alongside the announcement of a upcoming large-scale 2027 tour for North America.

== Musical style, influences, and legacy ==
The band's music has been described as a number of different genres, though despite the sound changes and lineup changes, the writing process has remained the same for the band; Howerdel primarily writes the band's instrumental music, while Keenan contributes the lyrics and vocal melodies. Keenan, already very well known for his work with fronting the band Tool through the 1990s, always strove to keep the sound of two bands different:

The [A Perfect Circle] music was very different, so I responded differently. The process that we go through in recording with Tool is very organic, but at the same time it is very thought out. There is a very left-brain process of dissecting what we're doing and drawing from source material; it's very research oriented and esoteric. With A Perfect Circle the process is far more mechanical and computer oriented, but at the same time it is also far more emotional and intuitive. Tool is more a left-brain masculine result, and [A Perfect Circle] is more a right-brain feminine result.

— Maynard James Keenan, The New York Times, March 2000

Howerdel has similarly described A Perfect Circle as a more emotional, vulnerable, and feminine approach to music than Tool. He has cited among his influences, several albums that had a strong effect on his way of playing: Adam Ant's Kings of the Wild Frontier, for its "weird hybrid of pirate music and American Indian influence", Siouxsie and the Banshees' Tinderbox as "one of the spookiest records I've ever heard" and for its "dense atmosphere", Ozzy Osbourne's Diary of a Madman as "Randy Rhoads has been a huge influence for me, especially when I was starting out" and finally the Cure's Pornography, which he described as "another spooky atmospheric record" and "one of the scariest albums I've ever heard".

Tracy Frey of AllMusic described the band's sound as "an extension of the alt-metal-fused-with-art rock style popularized by Tool in the early to mid-'90s. While similar to Tool in intensity and melancholy, A Perfect Circle is less dark and more melodic, with a theatrical, ambient quality that incorporates occasional strings and unusual instrumentation. While Keenan referred to the band first album, Mer de Noms, as more of a hard rock album, for subsequent albums, out of fear of redundancy, he often pushed for a more mellow, atmospheric sound, something he and Howerdel did not always see eye to eye on, creating a sound noted to be similar to merging heavy rock music with Disintegration-era The Cure music. In general, common genre classifications applied to labeling the band's music include alternative rock, alternative metal, hard rock, art rock, art metal, progressive rock and progressive metal. The band has also been lumped in with the nu metal genre, a label that is cited due to the band's rise to fame coinciding with the genre's movement towards more melodic heavy material similar to A Perfect Circle's sound, and its use was contested by many publications.

A Perfect Circle's first three studio albums sold over 4 million copies collectively as of 2005.Both A Perfect Circle and Tool have been widely hailed as major influences on modern rock. In a 2015 retrospective, VH1 noted that, "at some point sounding like Tool became a subgenre of rock. Although that is a little misleading as many of these bands were actually ripping off A Perfect Circle, because of its easier-to-grasp melody and simpler rhythms." Reviewers from outlets such as AllMusic and Rolling Stone cited Mer de Noms and Thirteenth Step as rare examples of relevance and quality in contemporary rock music. Online music magazine musicOMH asserted the band had "literally defined alternative rock as we know it."

== Band members ==
Current

- Maynard James Keenan – lead vocals (1999–2004, 2010–present)
- Billy Howerdel – lead guitar, keyboards, backing and occasional lead vocals, bass (studio only) (1999–2004, 2010–present)
- Josh Freese – drums (1999–2004, 2010–2011, 2024–present)
- James Iha – rhythm guitar, keyboards (2003–2004, 2010–present)
- Matt McJunkins – bass, backing vocals (2010–present)

Touring

- Greg Edwards – rhythm guitar, keyboards (2018, 2024–present; substitute for James Iha)

Former

- Tim Alexander – drums (1999)
- Paz Lenchantin – bass, strings, backing vocals, piano (1999–2002, 2004)
- Troy Van Leeuwen – rhythm guitar (1999–2002)
- Jeordie White – bass (2003–2004)
- Danny Lohner – rhythm guitar, bass, keyboards, backing vocals (2003, 2004)
- Jeff Friedl – drums (2011–2024)

Former touring

- Gunnar Olsen – drums (2024)

== Discography ==
- Mer de Noms (2000)
- Thirteenth Step (2003)
- Emotive (2004)
- Eat the Elephant (2018)
