= TalkTalk (A Perfect Circle song) =

Single by A Perfect Circle

from the album Eat the Elephant
- Released: February 5, 2018
- Recorded: 2017
- Genre: Art rock
- Length: 4:16
- Label: BMG
- Songwriter(s): Maynard James Keenan; Billy Howerdel
- Producer(s): Dave Sardy

A Perfect Circle singles chronology
"Disillusioned" (2018)	"TalkTalk" (2018)	"So Long, and Thanks for All the Fish" (2018)

"TalkTalk" is a song by American rock band A Perfect Circle. It was released on February 5, 2018, as their third single off of their album Eat the Elephant. It peaked at number 17 on the US Billboard Mainstream Rock Songs chart.

== Background and recording ==
"TalkTalk" is the third single from A Perfect Circle's fourth studio album, Eat the Elephant. The writing and recording of "TalkTalk" followed the band's usual process; starting initially as a musical idea written by band guitarist Billy Howerdel, who in turned presented a demo of it to band frontman Maynard James Keenan, to see if he was interested in writing a vocal melody and lyrics for it. However, in its original incarnation, written in 4/4 time, Keenan declined to move forward with the song, stating that he "didn't really hear anything in it". Howerdel, feeling strongly about the song, decided to keep working on the song, working with music producer Dave Sardy on the track. The two worked on drastically overhauling the song – Keenan requested they change the tempo and time signature to 3/4 time, while Sardy recommended muting out a number of the song's extra parts, stripping the song down to its drum beat and basic melody. Howerdel, initially struggled with the time change, but agreed to Keenan's change, eventually leading Keenan to respond favorably to the song's final instrumental form, leading him to write the vocal melody and lyrics found in the song's final release. The song was mastered and completed in January 2018, and released on February 5, 2018, the third song released ahead of Eat the Elephant's April 20, 2018 release, following "The Doomed" in October 2017, and "Disillusioned" in January 2018. A video of the song was also released at the time of the song's release, consisting only of footage of a multi-color octopus squirming in a person's hands for the entirety of the song.

== Themes and composition ==
Lyrically, music journalists generally interpreted the song to be a criticism of religion and politics affecting modern society. The song was described as a " scathing rebuke of American Christianity's stance on gun control" by Stereogum, a "lambast[ing of] falsely self-righteous people" by Rolling Stone, and "a take on pious hypocrites...who preach and pray but aren't walking their talk by taking action" by Revolver. ', containing the lyrics You're waiting /On miracles / We're bleeding out... / Talk like Jesus /Talk talk talk talk/ Get the fuck out of my way". Keenan, the song's lyricist, only conceded vague meanings in writing it, stating "Just broad strokes. With everything going on nowadays, it's about accountability."

Musically, the song was described by Revolver as having a " slow-build up from a deceptively placid piano foundation to an intense, declamatory chorus", with Loudwire adding that the song was built around guitars with a "washed out heaviness" over Keenan's moody vocals. Spin described its sound as an "ominous mini-epic". MetalSucks described the song's sound as "a perfect hybrid of 2003's The Thirteenth Step and 2000's slightly heavier/moodier predecessor, Mer de Noms.

== Reception ==
The song was praised by Kerrang! for being "a pretty sweet jam" and "everything [they] hoped it would be" in terms of new music from the band. Revolver named it one of their top songs of the week upon its release, stating that its message "won't sit too well with the silent majority — but it sure as hell sits well with us." Metal Sucks was also positive about the song, stating that the band had done a good job of blending the sound of Mer de Noms and Thirteenth Step with it.

== Personnel ==
Credits adapted from CD liner notes.

Band

- Maynard James Keenan – lead vocals
- Billy Howerdel – guitar, bass, keyboards
- Jeff Friedl – drums

Production

- Dave Sardy

== Charts ==
Chart (2018)	Peak position
US Hot Rock Songs (Billboard)	42
US Mainstream Rock (Billboard)	17
