= Maynard James Keenan discography =

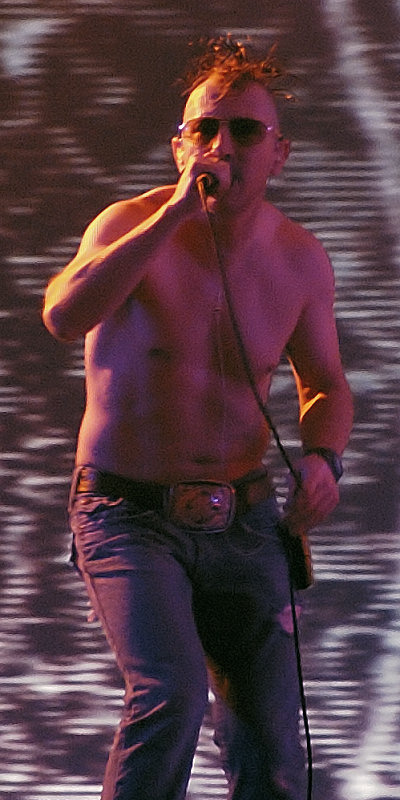
Keenan performing as part of Tool at the 2006 Roskilde Festival

Maynard James Keenan is best known as the singer of rock band Tool, with whom he has recorded five studio albums, A Perfect Circle, with whom he has recorded four studio albums, and Puscifer, a side project created by Keenan, has released five studio albums.

== Album appearance ==
=== With TexA.N.S. ===
- Live at Sons and Daughters Hall (1986)
- Never Again (1986)

=== With Children of the Anachronistic Dynasty ===
- Fingernails (1986)
- Dog House (1987)
- Peace Day (VHS release, 1987)

=== With Tool ===
Studio albums

Year	Album details	Peak chart positions													Certifications	
Year	Album details	US	AUS	AUT	CAN	FIN	FRA	GER	NLD	NOR	NZ	SWE	SWI	UK	Certifications	
1993	Undertow: Released: April 6, 1993; Label: Zoo/BMG/Volcano; Format: CD, cassette, LP	50	89	—	—	—	—	—	89	—	17	—	—	—	RIAA: 3× Platinum; CRIA: Platinum	
1996	Ænima: Released: October 1, 1996; Label: Zoo/BMG/Volcano; Format: CD, cassette, LP	2	6	—	—	—	—	75	75	36	1	53	79	108	RIAA: 3× Platinum; CRIA: Platinum	
2001	Lateralus: Released: May 15, 2001; Label: Volcano; Format: CD, cassette, LP	1	1	9	1	11	21	5	7	2	2	8	31	16	RIAA: 3× Platinum; CRIA: Platinum; BPI: Silver	
2006	10,000 Days: Released: May 2, 2006; Label: Volcano/Tool Dissectional; Format: CD	1	1	1	1	2	7	2	1	1	1	2	3	4	RIAA: 2× Platinum; CRIA: Platinum	
2019	Fear Inoculum: Released: August 30, 2019; Label: Volcano/RCA; Format: CD	1	1	3	1	2	9	2	3	1	1	7	2	4	RIAA: Gold	"—" denotes releases that did not chart or were not released in that country.

Other

Year	Album details	Peak chart position	
Year	Album details	US	AUS
1991	72826 (demo): Released: 1991; Label: Toolshed; Format: Cassette	—	—
1992	Opiate (EP): Released: March 10, 1992; Label: Zoo/BMG/Volcano; Format: CD, cassette	—	—
2000	Salival (Box set): Released: December 12, 2000; Label: Volcano II/Tool Dissectional; Format: CD/DVD, CD/VHS	38	29
"—" denotes releases that did not chart or were not released in that country.

!style="width:2em;font-size:75%"| US
!style="width:2em;font-size:75%"| AUS
!style="width:2em;font-size:75%"| CAN
!style="width:2em;font-size:75%"| NZ
!style="width:2em;font-size:75%"| UK

=== With A Perfect Circle ===
Studio albums

List of studio albums, with selected chart positions, sales figures and certifications
Title	Album details	Peak chart positions										Sales	Certifications
Title	Album details	US	AUS	CAN	FRA	GER	NLD	NZ	NOR	SWE	UK	Sales	Certifications
Mer de Noms	Released: May 23, 2000 (US); Label: Virgin; Formats: CD, CS, LP, digital download	4	2	5	—	55	81	2	32	54	55	US: 1,888,000	RIAA: Platinum; ARIA: Gold; BPI: Silver; MC: Platinum
Thirteenth Step	Released: September 16, 2003 (US); Label: Virgin; Formats: CD, CS, LP, digital download	2	3	1	41	11	17	1	7	17	37	US: 1,181,000	RIAA: Platinum; ARIA: Gold; MC: Gold; RIANZ: Gold
Emotive	Released: November 2, 2004 (US); Label: Virgin; Formats: CD, CS, LP, digital download	2	8	5	61	33	46	2	18	—	80	US: 671,000	RIAA: Gold; MC: Gold
Eat the Elephant	Released: April 20, 2018; Label: BMG; Formats: CD, LP, digital download	3	2	3	18	2	12	3	8	18	12	US: 63,000	
"—" denotes a recording that did not chart or was not released in that territory.

=== With Puscifer ===
Studio albums

Year	Title	Notes
2007	"V" Is for Vagina: Label: Sony BMG, Puscifer Entertainment; Released: October 30, 2007	Financed by Keenan
2011	Conditions of My Parole: Label: Puscifer Entertainment; Released: October 18, 2011	-
2013	Donkey Punch the Night: Label: Puscifer Entertainment; Released: February 19, 2013	-
2015	Money Shot: Label: Puscifer Entertainment; Released: October 30, 2015	-
2020	Existential Reckoning: Label: Puscifer Entertainment; Released: October 30, 2020	-

Other

Year	Title	Notes
2007	Don't Shoot the Messenger: Label: Puscifer Entertainment; Released: October 9, 2007	iTunes-only EP

== Collaborations ==
=== EPs ===
Year	Artist(s)	Album	Contribution	Ref.
2024	A Perfect Circle, Puscifer, and Primus	Sessanta E.P.P.P.	A 3-song EP containing one original song from each band. Keenan co-wrote each song and provided vocals for A Perfect Circle and Puscifer tracks.	

=== Songs ===
Year	Artist(s)	Album	Contribution	Ref.
1992	Rage Against the Machine	self-titled album	Vocals during the slow bridge in "Know Your Enemy"	
1993	Green Jellÿ	Cereal Killer Soundtrack	Performed the falsetto line "not by the hair of my chinny chin chin" of the song "Three Little Pigs"	
1994	Shandi's Addiction (with Billy Gould, Tom Morello and Brad Wilk)	Kiss My Ass: Classic Kiss Regrooved	Vocals, "Calling Dr. Love", a Kiss cover	
1995	Replicants	self-titled album	Vocals, "Silly Love Songs", a Wings cover	
1997	Tori Amos	Tori Amos: Live from New York	Duet, "Muhammad My Friend"	
2000	Melvins	The Crybaby	Appears with Tool on "Divorced"	
2000	Deftones	White Pony	Duet with Chino Moreno, "Passenger"	
2002	Thirty Seconds to Mars	self-titled album	Background vocals, "Fallen"	
2003	Titannica (fictional)	Run Ronnie Run (DVD)	Vocals, "Ass Kickin' Fat Kid" (in film only, not soundtrack)	
2003	David Bowie	Underworld Original soundtrack	Vocals, "Bring Me the Disco King (Lohner Mix)"	
2004	Axis of Justice	Concert Series Volume 1	Vocals, "(What's So Funny 'Bout) Peace, Love, and Understanding (Live)" performed with Chris Cornell at Lollapalooza 2003; and "Where the Streets Have No Name (Live)"	
2007	The Human Experimente	MP3 release	Vocals on the remix of King Crimson's "21st Century Schizoid Man"	
2008	Jubilee	In With The Out Crowd	Vocals on "I Don't Have An Excuse, I Just Need Help"	
2024	Night Club	Masochist	Vocals on "Gone"	

=== Other credits ===
Year	Work	Artist	Contribution	Ref.
2000	Yellow mY skYcaptain	Paz Lenchantin	Artwork	
2000	Mer de Noms	A Perfect Circle	Logo design	
2003	Thirteenth Step	A Perfect Circle	Executive producer, artwork	
2003	"Weak and Powerless" & "Blue" on Thirteenth Step	A Perfect Circle	Executive producer	
2003	"Judith (Renholder Mix)" & "REV 22:20" on Underworld Original Soundtrack	Various artists	Writer	
2004	AMotion	A Perfect Circle	Guitar, arranger, performer, executive producer, artwork	
2004	Emotive [Clean]	A Perfect Circle	Piano, executive producer, re-arranged	
2004	Emotive	A Perfect Circle	Piano, arranger, executive producer, re-arranged	
2005	Saw II Original Soundtrack [Clean]	Various artists	Remixing	
2005	Saw II Original Soundtrack	Various artists	Remixing	
2005	"Passive" on Constantine Original Soundtrack	Various artists	Writer	
2006	10,000 Days	Tool	Producer	
2007	"V" Is for Vagina	Puscifer	Acoustic guitar, percussion, drums, clavinet	
2024	"Pablo's Hippos" on Sessanta E.P.P.P.	Primus	Writer	
