= By and Down =

Single by A Perfect Circle

from the album Three Sixty
- Released: October 14, 2013
- Genre: Alternative rock; progressive rock; art rock
- Length: 5:34
- Label: Universal
- Songwriter(s): Billy Howerdel; Maynard James Keenan

A Perfect Circle singles chronology
"Passive" (2004)	"By and Down" (2013)	"The Doomed" (2017)

"By and Down" is a single by alternative rock band A Perfect Circle in 2013. The track represented the first studio material from the band in almost a decade's time. The studio version appears on the band's greatest hits album, Three Sixty, while a live version appears on their live box-set A Perfect Circle Live: Featuring Stone and Echo, both released in 2013. The song peaked at number 8 on the Billboard Mainstream Rock chart. An alternate version of the song, titled "By and Down the River", was later released on the band's fourth studio album, Eat the Elephant.

== Background ==
After the release of their third album Emotive, in 2004, A Perfect Circle went into a hiatus while the band's two major creative forces worked on other projects; lead vocalist Maynard James Keenan returned to work with his other bands, Tool and Puscifer, while Billy Howerdel released a solo album, Keep Telling Myself It's Alright under the moniker Ashes Divide. While the band reformed to tour in 2010, the band remained unsure how to move forward with releasing new music, due to their respective commitments, and changes in the record industry. Instead, the band chose to focus on touring, working on new songs piece by piece on the side, and premiering any finished songs in a live setting. The sessions mostly just resulted in "jamming" and bits and pieces, not whole songs though, due to the material "not quite sitting right yet".

The only complete song to result from these sessions would be "By and Down". The song was debuted as far back as June 2011, when the band played it live at their North American Summer tour. The band was initially unsure of what do with the song, with Howerdel stating he could see it could be "..put together in some collection...something more like a photo album where you collect these things and you put them in".

Despite playing the song live on tour, the band struggled to capture the desired sound in the studio, with Howerdel noting:

"The song had been played live for so many years now, for, like, two years. 2011 we played it for, like, seven weeks on that run, and a month this past year we did South America and Australia. And it was kind of, not an afterthought but it was the last thing, the last piece of the puzzle to be completed before this album came out. I kind of underestimated what it would take to do it because we had played it live so many times. The song was pretty realized, and I knew what it was gonna be. But just like anything else in the studio, just because you know the notes doesn't mean you know how the production's gonna go down. It took awhile to craft it into a proper studio recording that you were gonna be proud enough to release. Once I was in the middle of it, it did feel like familiar ground again to do that, but it definitely takes a little while to get back on the horse."

The song resurfaced in discussions of a greatest hits album in 2013, with Keenan describing the song as "the new track that we've been working on, that we never quite got around to recording." The band announced that the song will be released as a single. The studio version will be released on the band's greatest hits album, Three Sixty, on November 19, 2013, while a live version of a 2011 performance of the song will appear on the live boxset A Perfect Circle Live: Featuring Stone and Echo. Despite the song's multi-year history, the final studio release was finalized less than two months before its final release. The studio version debuted on October 14, 2013.

== Sound and composition ==
"By and Down" has been described as art rock and progressive rock with psychedelic guitar-work. The song opens with piano and orchestral chimes, followed by the introduction of Howerdel’s "simple but atmospheric guitar lead", and plays out as a "melodic minor key dirge". Keenan's vocals come in as an "eerie cries" over Howerdel's guitar. The song builds in volume and intensity over time, with "clanging drums" and "sweltering guitar hooks", "exploding" at its conclusion. Howerdel described the song's sound as "a journey. It's got a lot of movement to it, a nice arc and some subtle power".

== Reception ==
The song has been generally well received by critics. Spin favorably compared the song to Led Zeppelin, calling it a "five-minute Zep-style journey... is naturally moody, featuring what sounds like a gaggle of orchestra chimes and a melody that sounds like Dirty Projectors gone metal raga. Loudwire praised the song for being "... a dynamic tune, much what one would expect from a Keenan/Howerdel production...‘By and Down’ comes highly recommended."

The song peaked at number 8 on the Billboard Mainstream Rock chart, and at number 34 on the respective 2014 year-end chart.

== Charts ==
Chart (2013)	Peak position
US Mainstream Rock (Billboard)	8

== Personnel ==
Studio

- Maynard James Keenan – lead vocals
- Billy Howerdel – lead guitar
- Matt McJunkins – bass
- Jeff Friedl – drums
