= Dehumanization (album) =

Studio album by Crucifix
- Released: 1983
- Recorded: 1983
- Genres: Hardcore punk, anarcho-punk
- Length: 23:04
- Label: Corpus Christi

Dehumanization is the only full-length album by American hardcore punk band Crucifix. Released in 1983, it is regarded as one of the classic anarcho-punk records, as well as an important D-beat record.

The song "Prejudice" was covered live by the American anarcho-punk band Aus-Rotten, and released on their 1997 Not One Single Fucking Hit Discography compilation. "Annihilation" has been covered by the Brazilian metal band Sepultura and the American alternative rock band A Perfect Circle. The Varukers covered "Indo-China."

== Track listing ==
All tracks by Pheng, Borruso, Crucifix, Douglas and Smith.

1. "Annihilation" – 1:29
2. "How When Where" – 1:37
3. "Skinned Alive" – 0:47
4. "Prejudice" – 2:08
5. "No Limbs" – 1:36
6. "Another Mouth to Feed" – 1:50
7. "Search for the Sun" – 1:37
8. "Indo-China" – 2:23
9. "Three Miles to Oblivion" – 1:02
10. "See Through Their Lies" – 1:42
11. "Death Toll" – 2:38
12. "Blind Destruction" – 1:39
13. "Rise and Fall" – 0:43
14. "Stop Torture" – 1:53

== Credits ==
- Sothira Pheng - Vocals
- Jake Smith - Guitar
- Matt Borruso - Bass
- Chris Douglas - Drums
