= Three Sixty =

Greatest hits album by A Perfect Circle
- Released: November 19, 2013
- Genre: Art rock
- Label: Virgin
- Producer: Billy Howerdel, Maynard James Keenan, Danny Lohner

A Perfect Circle chronology
Amotion (2004)	Three Sixty (2013)	A Perfect Circle Live: Featuring Stone and Echo (2013)

Singles from Three Sixty
- 1. "By and Down" Released: October 14, 2013

Professional ratings
Review scores
Source	Rating
AllMusic	3.5/5 stars
New Noise Magazine	4/5 stars

Three Sixty is a greatest hits compilation released by American rock band A Perfect Circle on November 19, 2013. The set compiles songs from previous albums by the band and includes one new song, "By and Down". The album was also released in a deluxe edition (with dark blue cover art rather than white) which includes additional studio songs from the band's back catalog and live tracks from 2011 featured on the limited edition box set A Perfect Circle Live: Featuring Stone and Echo.

== Recording ==
On the standard release, all songs were previously released by A Perfect Circle except "By and Down", which they debuted in concert in the summer of 2011. The songs on the album are arranged chronologically by recording on both the standard and the extended deluxe edition.

The live tracks on the deluxe edition were recorded in Morrison, Colorado at the Red Rocks Amphitheatre in a series of concerts from 2011. The entirety of those three concerts is available on the box set A Perfect Circle Live: Featuring Stone and Echo.

== Critical response ==
The album has been critically praised as a strong collection of standout tracks from the band. AllMusic described the album as "a tour of the band's shiniest moments" that strips "their back catalog down to its most essential songs." New Noise Magazine wrote that "If you already have all of the band's albums, then you really don’t need this one, but I certainly won’t say that it wasn’t a great idea to get this material out to people who haven’t been able to hear it yet, or even knew that it existed." Fearnet also concludes that "If your only experience with A Perfect Circle comes via their movie soundtrack contributions and/or their higher-profile singles (which are quite impressive in themselves), this collection is an ideal way to catch up on the multi-textured and often experimental aspects of the band, and it represents their vast range of expression from rage-filled, angry anthems to thoughtful art-rock ballads, each of which bears Keenan and Howerdel's unforgettable artistic stamp."

== Track listing ==
Except where otherwise noted, all songs by Billy Howerdel and Maynard James Keenan.

1. "The Hollow" – 2:58
2. "Judith" – 4:04
3. "Orestes" – 4:45
4. "3 Libras" – 3:35
5. "Weak and Powerless" – 3:11
6. "The Noose" – 4:54
7. "The Outsider" – 4:06
8. "Blue" – 4:09
9. "When the Levee Breaks" (Douglas, McCoy) – 5:54
10. "Imagine" (Lennon) – 4:47
11. "Counting Bodies Like Sheep to the Rhythm of the War Drums" – 5:59
12. "Passive" (Howerdel, Keenan, Lohner, Reznor) – 4:10
13. "By and Down" – 5:33

=== Deluxe Edition – Disc 1 ===
1. "The Hollow" – 2:58
2. "Rose" – 3:24
3. "Judith" – 4:04
4. "Orestes" – 4:45
5. "3 Libras" – 3:35
6. "The Package" – 7:40
7. "Weak and Powerless" – 3:11
8. "The Noose" – 4:54
9. "The Outsider" – 4:06
10. "Blue" – 4:09

=== Deluxe Edition – Disc 2 ===
1. "Imagine" (Lennon) – 4:47
2. "Passive" (Howerdel, Keenan, Lohner, Reznor) – 4:10
3. "People Are People" (Live, 2011) (Gore) – 3:44
4. "Counting Bodies Like Sheep to the Rhythm of the War Drums" – 5:59
5. "When the Levee Breaks" (Douglas, McCoy) – 5:54
6. "By and Down" – 5:33
7. "3 Libras" (Live, 2010) – 6:11
8. "Gravity" (Live, 2010) – 5:10
9. "Fiddle and the Drum" (Live, 2010) (Mitchell) – 3:31

== Personnel ==
- Josh Eustis – audio mixing
- Tim Alexander – drums
- Josh Freese – drums
- Jeff Friedl – drums
- Steven R. Gilmore – art direction
- Michele Horie – production manager
- Billy Howerdel – arranger, artwork, engineer, guitar, keyboards, mixing, producer, background vocals
- James Iha – guitar
- Maynard James Keenan – arranger, artwork, producer, vocals
- Paz Lenchantin – strings, violin
- Danny Lohner – bass guitar, engineer, guitar, keyboards, mixing, producer
- Matt McJunkins – bass
- Troy Van Leeuwen – guitar
- Jeordie White – bass guitar
- Susan Lavoi – art direction
- Bob Ludwig – mastering
- Alan Moulder – mixing
- Andy Wallace – mixing
