= The Doomed =

Single by A Perfect Circle

from the album Eat the Elephant
- Released: October 16, 2017
- Recorded: 2017
- Genre: Hard rock; progressive rock
- Length: 4:41
- Label: BMG
- Songwriters: Billy Howerdel; Maynard James Keenan
- Producer: Dave Sardy

A Perfect Circle singles chronology
"By and Down" (2013)	"The Doomed" (2017)	"Disillusioned" (2018)

"The Doomed" is a song by American rock band A Perfect Circle. The song was first released as a single on October 16, 2017. It is the band's first single since 2013's "By and Down" for their greatest hits album Three Sixty, and was the lead single for their fourth studio album, Eat the Elephant. It peaked at number 16 on the Billboard US Mainstream Rock Songs chart in November 2017.

== Background ==
The song was first teased on October 13, 2017, through a short, fifteen second soundless video posted to the band's social media, saying nothing other than "A Perfect Circle - The Doomed". The ambiguity of the tease led to much speculation among music journalists, on whether it was about a song title, album title, or something else altogether. On Monday, October 16, the band revealed it to be a song, releasing it as a single. The song is their first in four years, since "By and Down" in 2013, from their greatest hits album Three Sixty. The song was released just prior to the band starting their second leg of their North American tour, which is scheduled to run from October to December 2017. It is planned to be on the band's upcoming fourth studio album, scheduled for release in 2018. The song was debuted live on October 21, 2017, at the Aftershock Festival.

On November 16, 2017, a music video, directed by Jeremy Danger and Travis Shinn, was released for the song. The video features the five band members, in black and white, looking pensive and bleak, with little movement other than slowly looking towards, or away from, the camera, with alternative white and black backdrops.

== Writing and recording ==
The song's origins date back to a song idea by band guitarist Billy Howerdel, who was working on writing the soundtrack for the indie film D-Love during the band's downtime in 2015. Howerdel had written a small orchestral part for the film that he was unable to fit into the finished project. Feeling there was still something there, Howerdel sent the part to band vocalist Maynard James Keenan during the band's 2017 writing sessions for a fourth studio album, not necessarily as a song idea, but rather, just as a starting point for writing material. Keenan approved of the part, requesting that Howerdel write a song around the idea. Despite generally slow writing sessions tracing back to 2008, the two moved quickly on the track; Howerdel wrote the song's music in a day and a half, and upon hearing his work, Keenan put down demo vocals just a day and a half later, with the song being completed shortly after. The song's lyrics were written entirely by Keenan.

== Themes and composition ==
The song's lyrics deals with topics such as wealth inequality and class inequality. Specifically, journalists interpreted the lyrics to be attacking the conservative ideal that society is not responsible for the well being of the less fortunate. The song's lyrics, written by band frontman Maynard James Keenan, conveyed the message through lines such as "What of the pious, the pure of heart, the peaceful? What of the meek, the mourning, and the merciful? All doomed. All doomed." Upon the release of the single, Keenan said of the song:

14 years have passed since we released Emotive. A new release is long overdue. In light of this current difficult and polarized social, spiritual and political climate, we artist types need to open our big mouths and share the light a little louder."

It was also interpreted to be a statement against modern Christianity, a topic Keenan frequently has addressed in his work, with AZ Central comparing it to a "nihilistic Sermon on the Mount". The song has been described as ominous, aggressive, apocalyptic and intense. While not the lyrics writer, Howerdel explained that, to him, the song was about the human condition of power corrupting the people in control of the world.

Musically, the song has been described as a "surging, sweeping riff-rocker that builds to a raging conclusion". The song alternates between soft and loud dynamics, the song starts with a prominent drum beat and guitarist Billy Howerdel's swirling guitar notes, before building into a hard rock sound with distorted guitars and Keenan's angry singing. The song then dials back to segments consisting only of Keenan's soft-spoken, melodic vocals over piano/xylophone parts, leading to a sound described as "a band's take on what an orchestra could accomplish if stripped to its bare bones, coming across as grand yet minimalistic."

== Reception ==
The song's initial release was generally well received by critics. Kerrang! named it their top song of the week upon release, praising it for taking the style of "Counting Bodies Like Sheep to the Rhythm of the War Drums" and giving it scathing lyrics relevant to the polarized political landscape of 2017. Loudwire described the song as "incredible" and "glorious", praising the track's progressive and atmospheric qualities. Glide magazine praised the song for being "stunning addition to A Perfect Circle catalogue" and "a fantastic example of how music and art should react to the horrors of contemporary life. Metal Sucks praised the song for being "unsurprisingly, it's good...there are parts that sound almost like viking metal, which is pretty rad. I do kinda miss Josh Freese's drums, which were less aggro and more eloquent than Jeff Friedl's, but it's not a deal breaker or whatever. On the whole, I can't really imagine any APC fan feeling let down by this." The song was named the fifth best hard rock song of 2017 by Loudwire.

== Personnel ==
Credits adapted from CD liner notes.

Band

- Maynard James Keenan – lead vocals
- Billy Howerdel – guitar, bass, keyboards
- Jeff Friedl – drums

Production

- Dave Sardy

== Charts ==
Chart (2017)	Peak position
US Hot Rock & Alternative Songs (Billboard)	19
US Mainstream Rock (Billboard)	16
