= Disillusioned =

Single by A Perfect Circle

from the album Eat the Elephant
- Released: January 1, 2018
- Recorded: 2017
- Genre: Rock; hard rock; art rock
- Length: 5:53
- Label: BMG
- Songwriters: Billy Howerdel; Maynard James Keenan
- Producer: Dave Sardy

A Perfect Circle singles chronology
"The Doomed" (2017)	"Disillusioned" (2018)	"TalkTalk" (2018)

"Disillusioned" is a song by American rock band A Perfect Circle. It is the second song released from the band's fourth studio album, Eat the Elephant. The song was released on YouTube, on January 1, 2018 and then released digitally on the following day. A limited edition physical vinyl was released on March 9, 2018, along with a music video.

== Background ==
The song's release was first teased by band frontman Maynard James Keenan on December 31, 2017. The song was later released for streaming the next day, on January 1, 2018, and released as a digital download on January 2, 2018. The song is their second released from their fourth studio album Eat the Elephant, the first being "The Doomed" in October 2017. The song was released on a physical 10 inch vinyl on March 9, 2018, alongside "The Doomed". Multiple outlets described it as the second single from their fourth studio album, while others just referred to it as a song from the album. A music video was released on March 9 as well; consisting of footage of people marching in unison, in black and white, while looking at their cell phones. The video transitions from black and white to color once people stop marching, put down their phones, and start interacting with one another.

The band's record label initially felt a reluctance in hearing that the band wished to issue a six minute long single, though upon hearing the track, agreed upon the band's decision.

== Composition and themes ==
The song's sound has been described as "atmospheric", "cinematic", and "ethereal". The first half of the song is as a piano ballad with contemplative vocals by Keenan, with a slow and steady beat, while the latter half was described as evolving into something grander without losing its sense of melancholy, giving the song a sombre sounding intro, and a more hopeful sounding ending. The middle part of the song contains a minute long piano interlude. While the latter half of the song eventually adds Billy Howerdel's "squalling" and "defiant" guitar parts, and "rowdy" drum parts by Jeff Friedl, the piano part remains dominant throughout the track. Keenan described the song as created by "a new approach to composing", something he described as "intimidating" due to the band already having a recognizable and established sound, but something he wanted to push forward with on the song anyway. His vocal take was described as a "restrained melodic rasp" with a "whispery and vulnerable delivery" by rock website Loudwire. Guitar World described the song as a mix between "a more surreal Smashing Pumpkins" and a "less electronic Radiohead".

Lyrically, the song was described by Rolling Stone magazine as being about "societal failures" and how long-term planning has been replaced by "futile attempts at instant gratification". The website noted that while earlier lyrics expressed a sense of defeat, such as "We have been overrun by our animal desire/ Addicts of the immediate keep us obedient and unaware", latter lyrics showed some hope, such as "Time to put the silicon obsession down/ Take a look around, find a way in the silence", though more as passing thoughts than as a rallying cry. Howerdel described the song as being about "overcoming the slide into the numb", contrary to the prior song released from their fourth studio album, "The Doomed", which was meant "as a wakeup call". Journalists noted that allusions to the "silicon obsession" seemed to allude the band speaking out against smart phones and social media in favor of personal interactions as well.

== Reception ==
Metal Sucks praised the song, concluding that it is "a bit chill for my tastes, although I know that's where the band is at creatively right now. Still, it certainly sounds like APC, so longtime fans should be happy with it. Loudwire listed it as one of the best rock songs of 2018 as of July, and as their best hard rock song of 2018 at year end.

== Personnel ==
Credits adapted from CD liner notes.

Band

- Maynard James Keenan – lead vocals
- Billy Howerdel – guitar, bass, keyboards
- Jeff Friedl – drums

Production

- Dave Sardy

== Charts ==
Chart (2018)	Peak position
US Hot Rock Songs (Billboard)	21
