= Counting Bodies Like Sheep to the Rhythm of the War Drums =

Promotional single by A Perfect Circle

from the album eMOTIVe
- Released: September 28, 2004
- Genre: Industrial
- Length: 5:36
- Label: Virgin
- Songwriters: Maynard James Keenan; Billy Howerdel
- Producer: A Perfect Circle

"Counting Bodies Like Sheep to the Rhythm of the War Drums" is a promotional single by the American rock band A Perfect Circle, off of their third studio album Emotive. While the album primarily consists of cover songs, this track and lead single "Passive" are original recordings. Containing many lyrical similarities with the track "Pet", from the previous album, Thirteenth Step, lead singer and lyricist Maynard James Keenan described the track as a continuation of the song. While the former refers to addiction, "Counting Bodies" focuses on political agendas.

== Music video ==
The video of "Counting Bodies Like Sheep to the Rhythm of the War Drums" is animated and deals with a political topic. The video begins with a peace symbol crumbling apart and falling from view. An oil derrick starts to turn, as blood slowly drips down the screen. In the next scene, a young boy climbing down from a tree meets a man who appears to be U.S. President George W. Bush riding a horse. The horse excretes a small television, and trots away. The boy sits down and watches the TV, and slowly turns into a sheep, as a plane flies behind and drops bombs in the background. Next, Bush walks into a classroom, carrying a small television. He places it down on the teacher's desk, and destroys the student's books. The video continues on in this manner until halfway through, when we see Bush sailing on a sea of blood. He enters a city dressed as a Roman Emperor and riding a sheep-driven chariot. After a moment, he then appears in a tank. As he progresses through the city, televisions fall out of windows, forming a sort of road for Bush.

He then begins to march through the area, with a brigade of sheep following him. Televisions begin to form a high-walled corridor. As the sheep continue to march, one turns around, stands up, and begins to climb the wall of televisions. As the sheep nears the top, another sheep stands up and marks him with an 'S' at the same time the word "Sedition" is displayed on the televisions making up the wall. An arm with a Republican elephant marked on an armband appears from the clouds, picks up the branded sheep, and throws him into a meat grinder. The animal emerges as a designer coat, and is then worn by a celebrity. In the next scene, two sheep stand up, and begin to kick down the television wall. These two sheep are then marked with the 'S' sign, and are impaled by two flags, marked 'Traitor'. The rest of the brigade follow Bush to a cliff, where he directs them over the edge into a blazing fire. George Bush's face then turns towards the viewer, alluding to hypnotizing the viewer as well.

== Track listing ==
1. "Counting Bodies Like Sheep to the Rhythm of the War Drums" – 5:36
2. "Emotive"
3. "Echo Chamber"

== Personnel ==
A Perfect Circle

- Maynard James Keenan – lead vocals
- Billy Howerdel – backing vocals
- Danny Lohner – instrumentation, backing vocals

Additional musicians

- Josh Eustis – drums, Rhodes piano
- Jason Freese – baritone and tenor saxophone

== In popular culture ==
The song was used in numerous trailers and TV spots for movies, TV shows and video games including Fantastic Four, The Taking of Pelham 123, Rage, Missing, Gotham, and House of Cards, in addition to the promo for UFC 167: St-Pierre vs Hendricks PPV.

== See also ==
- List of anti-war songs
