= What Normal Was =

Studio album by Billy Howerdel
- Released: June 10, 2022
- Genres: Alternative rock; electronic rock
- Length: 42:08
- Label: BMG
- Producer: Billy Howerdel

Billy Howerdel chronology
Keep Telling Myself It's Alright (2008)	What Normal Was (2022)

Singles from What Normal Was
- 1. "Poison Flowers" Released: 2022; 2. "Selfish Hearts" Released: 2022

What Normal Was is a solo studio album by Billy Howerdel, guitarist of A Perfect Circle. The album is his first to be directly released under his own name, and his second solo album overall, after releasing his prior album, Keep Telling Myself It's Alright (2008), under the pseudonym Ashes Divide 14 years prior.

== Background ==
Billy Howerdel, after serving as a guitar tech for various bands throughout the 1990s, met Tool frontman Maynard James Keenan and convinced him to start a new band, eventually named A Perfect Circle. After releasing three successful albums in the early 2000s - Mer de Noms (2000), Thirteenth Step (2003), and Emotive (2004), the band went on hiatus while Keenan focused on his other projects, Puscifer and Tool. Knowing the band would likely be inactive for some time, Howerdel decided to work on a solo album. Howerdel worked on the album for years, finishing and releasing the album, Keep Telling Myself It's Alright in 2008 under the pseudonym Ashes Divide. Despite the debut single "The Stone" hitting the top 10 of the Billboard Hot Mainstream Rock Tracks and Hot Modern Rock Tracks charts, the album only debuted and peaked at number 36 on the Billboard 200 chart. Despite the underwhelming sales, Howerdel decided to work on a follow-up solo album.

== Writing and recording ==
Work on a second solo album started up shortly after the release of Keep Telling Myself It's Alright. Upon A Perfect Circle's reformation in 2010, Howerdel had noted that he had been writing and demoing new material and presenting it to Keenan for his thoughts; song ideas Keenan liked were put into consideration for A Perfect Circle, while ideas he wasn't interested in was kept for Howerdel's solo work. He noted that progress was slow though, as Keenan often reacted unexpectedly to material he presented. While Howerdel focused on touring with A Perfect Circle across much of 2011, he returned to focusing on his solo work in 2012, stating that by the end of 2012, he had 11 songs in contention for his second solo album. However, he also noted that he was "Still working on finishing vocals and writing lyrics", with the goal of wrapping up and mixing the album in early 2013. This would not come to fruition, with Howerdel later in 2013 revealing that progress was stalled after a number of songs were re-designated and reworked as A Perfect Circle songs again.

For years after, Howerdel would be quiet about the project as he turned his focus on the also-slow development of A Perfect Circle's fourth album, Eat the Elephant, which was released in 2018. Prior to its release, Howerdel noted that he still continued to work on the material, but the sound of the music had deviated so far from the band's first album that he was contemplating whether or not he'd release it under the Ashes Divide name." In 2018, Howerdel reiterated his plans to use the Ashes Divide name; but noted further changes in the material since that some songs he had been working on ended up being Eat the Elephant tracks instead, notably their last single from the album, "So Long, and Thanks for All the Fish".

After numerous delays from 2020, to 2021, to 2022, the album was finally completed in 2022. In early 2022, it was announced that Howerdel would forego using the Ashes Divide moniker in lieu of using his own name, instead. In addition to vocals and most instruments outside of drums, Howerdel also acted as producer as well.

== Themes and composition ==
Howerdel described the album as the music he would have made as a teenager if he had the knowledge and technology of 2022 back then. Major influences for the album include Pink Floyd, The Cure, and Echo and the Bunnymen. The first single, "Poison Flowers", was described as "an atmospheric, psychedelic, alt-metal song that's not too far removed from [A Perfect Circle]".

== Release and promotion ==
The album is scheduled for release on June 10, 2022. A US tour in support of the album was also announced, starting the day after the album release and running through much of July. A few Canadian dates are also planned. Two dates on the tour will be with Puscifer, the side-project by A Perfect Circle band member Maynard James Keenan.

== Reception ==
The album was featured on multiple Revolver magazine "most anticipated albums" lists, including their "45 Most Anticipated albums of 2020", "60 Most Anticipated Albums of 2021", and "50 Most Anticipated Albums of 2022". Kerrang gave the album a 4/5 rating, praising the album for being "...a magnificent creation that sees Billy stepping away from prior stylistic palettes while also satisfying certain expectations... it's a fitting yet fresh statement that reveals new dimensions of his artistry without alienating fans of his past work. In multiple ways, then, it's a complete and irresistible triumph.

== Track list ==
All lyrics are written by Billy Howerdel; all music is composed by Billy Howerdel, except "Stars", by Johnette Napolitano and Howerdel.

What Normal Was track listing
No.	Title	Length
1.	"Selfish Hearts"	2:50
2.	"Free and Weightless"	3:42
3.	"Ani"	4:25
4.	"The Same Again"	3:33
5.	"Beautiful Mistake"	5:12
6.	"Poison Flowers"	5:33
7.	"Follower"	4:00
8.	"Bring Honor Back Home"	3:46
9.	"EXP"	3:57
10.	"Stars"	5:10
Total length:		42:08

== Personnel ==
- Billy Howerdel – vocals, guitar, bass, keyboard, drums on EXP and Bring Honor Back Home
- Josh Freese – drums on Selfish Hearts, Free and Weightless, The Same Again, Beautiful Mistake, Poison Flowers, Follower and Stars
- Danny Lohner – guitar on Free and Weightless; programming on Free and Weightless, Ani and The Same Again
- Matt McJunkins – additional bass on Beautiful Mistake and Follower
- Scott Kirkland – additional programming on Selfish Hearts
- Hannah Vandermolen – vocals on Stars and vocal production on Beautiful Mistake
- Cassandra Church, Valeria Hylytukha, and Marissa Nadler – backing vocals on EXP
