= The Hollow (song) =

2000 single by A Perfect Circle

- Hollow, Pt. 1 Cover

Single by A Perfect Circle

from the album Mer de Noms
- Released: 2000
- Studio: Sound City (Van Nuys, California)
- Length: 2:58 (album version); 3:20 (2001 single mix)
- Label: Virgin
- Songwriters: Maynard James Keenan; Billy Howerdel
- Producer: Billy Howerdel

A Perfect Circle singles chronology
"3 Libras" (2000)	"The Hollow" (2000)	"Weak and Powerless" (2003)

"The Hollow" is a single from American rock supergroup A Perfect Circle's debut album, Mer de Noms (2000). It serves as the opening track of the album, utilizing layered guitars. "The Hollow" was recorded in the key of B-flat minor and is arranged using a 6/8 time signature. Tim Alexander, drummer from the band Primus plays drums on the album version of the song. The song was remixed for the 2001 single release.

== Track listings ==
Part 1

1. "The Hollow" – 2:58
2. "The Hollow" (live) – 3:04
3. "Judith" (Renholdër mix) – 4:27

Part 2

1. "The Hollow" (live)
2. "The Hollow" (The Bunk remix)
3. "Judith" (video)

Australian release

1. "The Hollow"
2. "The Hollow" (live)
3. "Judith" (Renholdër mix)

European release

1. "The Hollow"
2. "The Hollow" (Constantly Consuming remix)
3. "The Hollow" (The Bunk remix)
4. "Judith" (Renholdër mix)
5. "Judith" (video)

== Personnel ==
Personne are adapted from the Mer de Noms liner notes

A Perfect Circle

- Maynard James Keenan – lead vocals
- Billy Howerdel – vocals, guitar, bass

Additional musician

- Tim Alexander – drums

== Charts ==
=== Weekly charts ===
Weekly chart performance for "The Hollow"
Chart (2000–2001)	Peak position
Australia (ARIA)	49
Scotland Singles (OCC)	86
UK Singles (OCC)	72
UK Rock & Metal (OCC)	5
US Alternative Airplay (Billboard)	17
US Mainstream Rock (Billboard)	14

=== Year-end charts ===
Year-end chart performance for "The Hollow"
Chart (2001)	Position
US Modern Rock Tracks (Billboard)	63

== Release history ==
Release dates and formats for "The Hollow"
Region	Date	Format(s)	Label(s)	Ref.
Australia	2000	CD	Virgin	
United Kingdom	November 6, 2000	7-inch vinyl; CD	Virgin	
United States	January 30, 2001	Mainstream rock; active rock; alternative radio	Virgin	
