= Passive (song) =

Single by A Perfect Circle

from the album Emotive
- Released: January 18, 2005
- Genre: Alternative rock
- Length: 4:09
- Label: Virgin
- Songwriters: Maynard James Keenan; Billy Howerdel; Danny Lohner; Trent Reznor
- Producer: Billy Howerdel

A Perfect Circle singles chronology
"Imagine" (2004)	"Passive" (2005)	"By and Down" (2013)

"Passive" is a song by American rock band A Perfect Circle. The song, originating from the Tapeworm side-project under the title "Vacant", was eventually recorded in the studio as "Passive" by A Perfect Circle around the time of the side-project's demise. It was the second single from their album Emotive, and peaked at number 14 on the Billboard Mainstream Rock Songs chart in 2005.

== Background ==
The song's origins trace back to a song by a band called Tapeworm, a side-project started by Nine Inch Nails frontman Trent Reznor and a number of other musicians, including A Perfect Circle members Maynard James Keenan and Danny Lohner. The original version of the song was written and recorded in 1999 under the title "Vacant". This version of the song had the music written by Lohner, rearranged by Charlie Clouser, lyrics and melody written by Keenan, and chorus and backing vocals written by Reznor. However, the project was hit with many delays for a number of reasons, including creative disagreements, schedule conflicts with members' other respective bands, and legal issues stemming from all the various record labels the members were separately tied to via their other bands.

With the project not progressing, Keenan decided to start playing the song at live shows for A Perfect Circle in 2000. While Reznor expressed irritation about the material being debuted in this manner, where it eventually became a live staple at their shows, the band at the time only had one album's worth of material to play, Mer de Noms. With the Tapeworm project becoming defunct in 2004, without releasing any studio recordings, the song was reworked into "Passive" with A Perfect Circle guitarist Billy Howerdel and released on their third studio album, Emotive, in November 2004. The writing of this version of the song was credited to Lohner, Keenan, Reznor, and Howerdel.

The song was later released as the second single from Emotive in early 2005. The song was also featured in the 2005 superhero film Constantine, and the song's music video also features footage from the film. Both the film's special effects and the music video were directed by Brothers Strause.

== Track listing ==
No.	Title	Length
1.	"Passive" (radio edit)	4:00
2.	"Passive" (album version clean)	4:08

== Personnel ==
- Maynard James Keenan – lead vocals
- Billy Howerdel – guitar, backing vocals
- Danny Lohner – guitar, bass
- Paz Lenchantin – piano
- Josh Freese – drums

== Charts ==
=== Weekly charts ===
Weekly chart performance for "Passive"
Chart (2005)	Peak position
US Alternative Airplay (Billboard)	14
US Mainstream Rock (Billboard)	14

=== Year-end charts ===
Year-end chart performance for "Passive"
Chart (2005)	Position
US Modern Rock Tracks (Billboard)	63
