= Blue (A Perfect Circle song) =

2004 single by A Perfect Circle

Single by A Perfect Circle

from the album Thirteenth Step
- Released: July 26, 2004
- Studio: Perfect Circle (North Hollywood, California)
- Length: 4:13
- Label: Virgin
- Songwriters: Billy Howerdel; Maynard James Keenan
- Producers: Billy Howerdel; Maynard James Keenan

A Perfect Circle singles chronology
"The Outsider" (2003)	"Blue" (2004)	"Imagine" (2004)

"Blue" is a song by American rock band A Perfect Circle. It was released the third single from the band's second studio album, Thirteenth Step, in July 2004. The song was a moderate success, peaking at number 19 on the US Billboard Mainstream Rock Tracks chart and number 21 on the Billboard Modern Rock Tracks chart. A remix version, "Blue (Bird Shake mix)", was created by guitarist James Iha and included on the band's compilation album Amotion.

== Writing and recording ==
After the release of the band's first album, Mer de Noms, lead singer Maynard James Keenan returned to his other band, Tool in late 2000. While Keenan and guitarist Billy Howerdel had originally planned on working on material for a second album, which would become Thirteenth Step, while he was on the road with Tool. However, Keenan found it difficult to try to juggle two bands at once, instead leaving Howerdel to work on the album with the rest of the band across 2001 and 2002. The song originates from Howerdel's early sessions for the album, being written shortly after seeing the effects of the 9/11 attacks in September 2001. Influenced by the dark scenes, Howerdel wrote thinking of themes of "escape" and "fearing the worst". The song's first iteration was written and recorded all in one take by Howerdel with a bass guitar, under the working title of "Red". After Keenan reconvened with the band for the album's final recording sessions over the first half of 2003, tension occurred between Keenan and Howerdel, due to Keenan wanting to rearrange and mellow out many of Howerdel's early sessions recordings such as "Blue". During this time, the song was given lyrics by Keenan, who tied its meaning more into the Thirteenth Step's concept of addiction and recovery, with the lyrics being about having to confront the aftermath of a person overdosing on drugs, especially heroin usage. Allegory in the lyrics refer to respiratory depression, resulting in features turning blue from a lack of oxygen, somnolence (referred to as 'nodding' by recreational users), and euphoria.

== Release and alternate versions ==
Keenan and Howerdel also clashed on its release as a single; Howerdel preferred releasing "The Outsider" as a single first, while Keenan preferred releasing "Blue" first. Howerdel persevered in this instance, with "The Outsider" being released as the second single, and "Blue" being released as the third single on July 27, 2004. The band held a contest for fans in creating the music video, challenging them to create the most "creative, arresting, and imaginative" video for the album. The contest was won by Joseph Perez, and his version, along with the three runner-up entries, were included on the band's compilation CD/DVD release Amotion in November 2004. An electronic remix of the song done by guitarist James Iha, who had not performed on the album version of the song, having not joined the band yet, was released on the CD side of Amotion release and also received radio airplay.

== Reception ==
The single was generally well received critically and commercially. Team Rock ranked the song as the band's fourth best of all time in 2010, praising the song's duality, stating "Listen while half-distracted and you've got a pleasant melody that embeds itself in your brain; pay full attention, and it's full of APC's trademark creepiness." Artist Direct also placed it in their group of top ten A Perfect Circle songs, praising it for "Keenan's signature croon makes for one of the group's most melodic and majestic ruminations" and "Howerdel's playing feels downright cinematic as everything collides on that sinisterly sweet hook." AllMusic highlighted it as one of the songs that best illustrated the band's newer, more mellow and atmospheric sound on the album, and stating that it "features a kind of barely restrained menace caught in a trap by rock & roll vulnerability". "Blue" peaked at number 19 on the US Billboard Mainstream Rock Tracks chart and number 21 on the Billboard Modern Rock Tracks chart.

== Track listing ==
No.	Title	Length
1.	"Blue" (album version)	4:14
2.	"Blue" (Bird Shake Mix)	3:55

== Charts ==
Chart (2004)	Peak position
US Mainstream Rock Tracks (Billboard)	19
US Modern Rock Tracks (Billboard)	21
