= Poison Flowers (song) =

Single by Billy Howerdel

from the album What Normal Was
- Released: March 4, 2022
- Genre: Alternative rock, progressive rock
- Length: 5:34
- Label: BMG
- Songwriter: Billy Howerdel
- Producer: Billy Howerdel

Billy Howerdel singles chronology
"The Stone" (2008)	"Poison Flowers" (2022)	"Selfish Hearts" (2022)

"Poison Flowers" is a song by American rock musician Billy Howerdel (of A Perfect Circle). It is the debut single from his solo album What Normal Was. The song is the first new solo music from Howerdel's since Keep Telling Myself Its Alright, released under the moniker Ashes Divide, in 2008.

== Background ==
After three albums as the guitarist of A Perfect Circle in the early 2000s, Billy Howerdel wished to branch out and record a solo album while A Perfect Circle frontman Maynard James Keenan returned to his band Tool. Howerdel released the album Keep Telling Myself Its Alright under the moniker Ashes Divide in 2008, but ceased releasing solo material shortly after the release. Work on new material privately started in earnest in 2018 while touring in support of A Perfect Circle's fourth studio album Eat the Elephant. When writing the song, Howerdel first started with the bass line, and pieced together other parts over it. A teaser trailer for the song was released in February 2022. In March 2022, Howerdel released the song, "Poison Flowers", his first new solo music in 14 years.

== Themes and composition ==
The song features Howerdel providing vocals, guitar, bass, piano, and production on the track. Drums were performed by Josh Freese, who had previously worked with Howerdel in A Perfect Circle and Ashes Divide. Guitar World described the song's sound as a mix between Pink Floyd and Nine Inch Nails, while Consequence described it as the same style of alternative rock that fans of A Perfect Circle would appreciate. Revolver described the track as having an "ethereal" and "brooding", with "gothic vocals" and "oodles of atmospheric textures".

== Personnel ==
- Billy Howerdel – vocals, guitar, bass, piano, production
- Josh Freese – drums
