= Amotion =

Compilation album by A Perfect Circle
- Released: November 16, 2004
- Genre: Alternative rock; industrial; ambient
- Length: 39:38 (CD)
- Label: Virgin
- Producer: Various

A Perfect Circle chronology
| Emotive (2004) | Amotion (2004) | Three Sixty (2013) |

Professional ratings
Review scores
| Source | Rating |
|---|---|
| AllMusic | 4/5 stars |
| Classic Rock | 2/5 stars |

Amotion (stylized as aMOTION) is a DVD–CD set released by American rock band A Perfect Circle on November 16, 2004, only two weeks after the debut of the band's third album, Emotive. The DVD consists of music videos for the singles "Judith", "3 Libras" and "Weak and Powerless", as well as previously unreleased videos for singles such as "Blue" and "Thinking of You". The CD is composed entirely of remixes of the singles from Mer de Noms and Thirteenth Step. The songs were retooled by Danny Lohner, Joshua Eustis, Massive Attack, and James Iha among others. The video album debuted at number four on the SoundScan Top Music Video chart and number ten on the Australian music DVD chart. Amotion was certified Platinum by the RIAA on 17 December 2004.

== DVD track listing ==
| No. | Title | Length |
|---|---|---|
| 1. | "Judith" (Unedited music video) | 4:07 |
| 2. | "3 Libras" (Music video) | 3:39 |
| 3. | "Weak and Powerless" (Unedited video) | 3:26 |
| 4. | "The Outsider" (Edited music video) | 4:17 |
| 5. | "Thinking of You" (Music video) | 4:38 |
| 6. | "Counting Bodies Like Sheep to the Rhythm of the War Drums" (Music video) | 5:59 |
| 7. | "Blue" (Music video) | 4:03 |
| 8. | "The Noose" (Live video) | 5:49 |
| 9. | "Imagine" (Music video) | 4:57 |
| 10. | "The Outsider" (Director's cut music video) | 4:26 |
| 11. | "Blue" (Runner-up A music video) |
| 12. | "Blue" (Runner-up B music video) |
| 13. | "Blue" (Runner-up C music video) |
| 14. | "Bikini Bandits Experience" (Trailer) |
| 15. | "Bikini Bandits Save Christmas" (Trailer) |
| 16. | "Bikini Bandits Sauvent Le Monde" (Trailer) |

== CD track listing ==
All lyrics are written by A Perfect Circle.

| No. | Title | Remixer | Length |
|---|---|---|---|
| 1. | "Judith" (Renholdër Mix) | Danny Lohner, Joshua Eustis | 4:24 |
| 2. | "3 Libras" (Feel My Ice Dub Mix) | Danny Lohner | 4:28 |
| 3. | "The Outsider" (Apocalypse Mix) | Danny Lohner | 5:28 |
| 4. | "Weak and Powerless" (Tilling My Grave Mix) | Danny Lohner, Wes Borland, Joshua Eustis | 3:05 |
| 5. | "The Outsider" (Frosted Yogurt Mix) | James Iha | 4:07 |
| 6. | "Blue" (Bird Shake Mix) | James Iha, Geoff Sanoff | 3:56 |
| 7. | "3 Libras" (All Main Courses Mix) | Robert "3D" Del Naja & Grant "Daddy G" Marshall (credited as Massive Attack) | 7:16 |
| 8. | "The Hollow" (Constantly Consuming Mix) | Paz Lenchantin | 3:39 |
| 9. | "The Hollow" (The Bunk Mix) | Troy Van Leeuwen, Josh Abraham | 3:12 |

== Personnel ==
- Christopher Abbas – Director
- Josh Abrahams – Remixing
- Tim Alexander – Group member
- Ken Andrews – Mixing
- Wes Borland – Remixing
- Brothers Strause – Director
- Jerry Casale – Director
- Joshua Eustis – Drums, engineer, Fender Rhodes, remixing, mixing
- David Fincher – Director
- Jason Freese – Sax (baritone), sax (tenor)
- Josh Freese – Drums, group member
- Steven R. Gilmore – Art direction, design, package design, cover design, sleeve art, poster design
- Billy Howerdel – Bass, guitar, programming, vocals, vocals (background), producer, engineer, photography, group member
- James Iha – Guitar, keyboards, remixing, group member
- Maynard James Keenan – Guitar, arranger, vocals, performer, executive producer, artwork, group member
- Mark Kohr – Director
- Paz Lenchantin – Piano, strings, vocals, acoustic guitar, performer, group member
- Luciano Lenchantin – Viola on "3 Libras"
- Danny Lohner – Arranger, vocals, multiple instruments, engineer, remixing, mixing, group member
- Robert Del Naja – Remixing
- Jeff Myers – Editing
- Geoff Sanoff – Remixing
- Branden Steineckert – Drums
- Paul Thiel – Director
- Troy Van Leeuwen – Guitar, remixing, group member
- Jeordie Osborne White – Bass, vocals (background), group member

== Chart positions ==
| Chart (2004) | Peak |
|---|---|
| Australian Music DVDs (ARIA) | 10 |
| US Billboard 200 | 57 |
| US Top Music Videos (SoundScan) | 4 |

This album has been released with the Copy Control protection system in some regions.
