= 3 Libras =

2000 single by A Perfect Circle

Single by A Perfect Circle

from the album Mer de Noms
- Released: August 29, 2000
- Length: 3:35
- Label: Virgin
- Songwriters: Billy Howerdel; Maynard James Keenan
- Producer: Billy Howerdel

A Perfect Circle singles chronology
"Judith" (2000)	"3 Libras" (2000)	"The Hollow" (2001)

Music video
- "3 Libras" on YouTube

"3 Libras" is a song by alternative rock band A Perfect Circle. The song was the second single from their debut album Mer de Noms. The song was well received both critically and commercially, with it peaking at number 12 on both the US Billboard Modern Rock Tracks and Mainstream Rock Tracks charts in 2000.

== Background ==
As with all of the Mer de Noms album, "3 Libras'" music was written by guitarist Billy Howerdel, while the lyrics were written by vocalist Maynard James Keenan. The two originally envisioned the track to be the first single of their debut album prior to being talked into going with the hard rock track "Judith" by record label executives, who felt the track was a better lead off single due to it being less of a departure from Keenan's other band, Tool.

Two official remixed versions of the song have been made; the "Feel My Ice Dub Mix" by band member Danny Lohner, and the "All Main Courses Mix" by Robert "3D" Del Naja of Massive Attack. They were compiled in 2004 on the band's remix album Amotion.

== Composition ==
While much of Mer de Noms' sound is identified with a conventional hard rock aesthetic, "3 Libras" sound is primarily driven by acoustic guitar and violin. Majority of the song consists of melodic, clean guitar tones, and a violin melody played over, composed by band bassist and violinist Paz Lenchantin. Drummer Josh Freese plays the rim of the drum kit on every eighth note, with the song being performed in 6/8. The song finishes with a full-band performance and distorted electric guitars in the song's outro, ending on a dark guitar chord.

Several alternate versions the song have very different compositions. The "Feel My Ice Dub Mix" featured a greatly slowed down tempo and added electronic beats and effects, giving it a more trance-like sound, where the "All Main Courses Mix" made extensive use of radio static and noise sound effects. When performed live, in absence of a dedicated violinist, the band would commonly play an alternate version of the song, with Howerdel playing clean electric guitar tones through the song, with the full band backing him with their respective instruments.

== Reception ==
The song was generally well received, commercially and critically. The song received significant radio airplay, charting at number 12 on both the US Billboard Modern Rock Tracks and Mainstream Rock Tracks charts. Critics praised the song. Sputnikmusic referred to the song as "one of the most beautiful songs APC ever released" and "one of the most emotional releases of the album". Artistdirect editor in chief Rick Florino named the track one of the "Top 20 Maynard James Keenan Songs", calling it "...a tender moment of longing encased in a beautiful, blissful melody...'3 Libras' illuminates the singer's massive vocal range and ability." Florino separately praised the band's live composition of the song as well, stating that he felt it reached "heavenly heights" when performed by the band in their reunion tours in 2010.

== Track listing ==
All music was composed by Billy Howerdel, and all lyrics were written by Maynard James Keenan.

CD1

1. "3 Libras"
2. "Magdalena" (live)
3. "3 Libras" (Feel My Ice dub mix)
4. "Judith" (live)
5. "3 Libras" (live)

CD2

1. "3 Libras" (live in Phoenix)
2. "3 Libras" (All Main Courses mix)
3. "Sleeping Beauty" (live in Phoenix)
4. Interactive picture gallery (CD-ROM)

== Personnel ==
Personnel are adapted from Mer de Noms liner notes

A Perfect Circle

- Maynard James Keenan – vocals
- Billy Howerdel – guitar, bass
- Josh Freese – drums
- Paz Lenchantin – violin

Additional musician

- Luciano Lenchantin – viola

== Charts ==
=== Weekly charts ===
Chart (2000–2001)	Peak position
Australia Alternative (ARIA)	23
UK Singles (Official Charts)	49
US Mainstream Rock Tracks (Billboard)	12
US Modern Rock Tracks (Billboard)	12

=== Year-end charts ===
Chart (2000)	Position
US Mainstream Rock Tracks (Billboard)	71
US Modern Rock Tracks (Billboard)	68

Chart (2001)	Position
US Modern Rock Tracks (Billboard)	68

== Release history ==
Region	Date	Format(s)	Label(s)	Ref.
United States	August 29, 2000	Mainstream rock; active rock; alternative radio	Virgin	
United Kingdom	January 1, 2001	7-inch vinyl; CD	Virgin	
Australia	January 29, 2001	CD	Virgin	
