= Selfish Hearts =

Single by Billy Howerdel

from the album What Normal Was
- Released: May 27, 2022
- Recorded: 2021
- Genre: Alternative rock, synth pop
- Length: 2:50
- Label: BMG
- Songwriter: Billy Howerdel
- Producer: Billy Howerdel

Billy Howerdel singles chronology
"Poison Flowers" (2022)	"Selfish Hearts" (2022)

"Selfish Hearts" is a song by American rock musician Billy Howerdel. It was a single off of his solo studio album What Normal Was.

== Background ==
"Selfish Hearts" is a song from Billy Howerdel's solo album What Normal Was. It was released on May 27, 2022, ahead of the album's June 10 release date. The song was the fourth released prior to the album's release in a campaign of releasing a song a week leading up to the album's release, with prior songs being "Poison Flowers", "Free and Weightless", "Beautiful Mistake". Howerdel noted that, despite trying out many various track list orderings over the course of the creation process of the What Normal Was album, he always chose "Selfish Hearts" as the album opener. He explained that the song's sound and relatively short run-time was the best way to illustrate that What Normal Was was a very different sounding album than his work with A Perfect Circle or even his prior solo album Keep Telling Myself Its Alright.

== Themes and composition ==
Revolver described the song as a "gothy synth-pop tune with smokey plumes of keyboards, a skittering drum machine beat and a sonorous vocal delivery." The prominence and "eerie" sound of the synthesizers in the song lead publications to compare its sound to the work of Depeche Mode and David Bowie.

== Reception ==
Kerrang named it the standout track of the album, citing "its fusion of symphonic, electronic and industrial instrumentation and captivating hooks yields a movingly inventive experience".

== Personnel ==
- Billy Howerdel – vocals, guitar, bass, keyboard
- Josh Freese – drums
