= Scream & Shout (disambiguation) =

"Scream & Shout" is a song by will.i.am featuring Britney Spears.

Scream and Shout may also refer to:

- Screaming
- Scream and Shout, an EP by KLOQ
- Scream and Shout, an album by Coretta Scott 2005
- Scream and Shout, a song by Timofey & Brenes ft. Terri B! 2011
- Scream and Shout, a song by Instant Funk 1979
- Scream and Shout, a song by Sea Girls 2024
