= Keep Telling Myself It's Alright =

Studio album by Ashes Divide
- Released: April 8, 2008
- Recorded: 2007
- Genres: Alternative rock; alternative metal; hard rock
- Length: 44:31
- Label: Island
- Producers: Billy Howerdel; Danny Lohner

Ashes Divide chronology
Keep Telling Myself It's Alright (2008)	What Normal Was (2022)

Singles from Keep Telling Myself It's Alright
- 1. "The Stone" Released: January 22, 2008; 2. "Enemies" Released: June 2008

Keep Telling Myself It's Alright is the debut studio album by American rock band Ashes Divide, the solo-project by A Perfect Circle guitarist Billy Howerdel. While efforts towards a Howerdel solo album were started even back in his time in A Perfect Circle during touring in support of their 2003 album Thirteenth Step, commitments to A Perfect Circle and other projects, along with some difficult recording sessions, pushed the album's US release out to April 8, 2008. It was released in Australia on April 19. Its first single, "The Stone", entered radio circulation in January of that year.

== Background ==
=== Writing and recording ===
Billy Howerdel first started working off and on solo material prior to the release of A Perfect Circle's second album, Thirteenth Step, in 2003. Rough versions of three or four songs had been written during the era, including the track "Stripped Away," which was even played at soundchecks at A Perfect Circle concerts while supporting the album. Additionally, the A Perfect Circle demo "Army" was eventually reworked into Howerdel's own "The Stone". Shortly after Thirteenth Step, A Perfect Circle decided to quickly throw together a collection of anti-war cover songs just prior to the 2004 Presidential Elections, entitled Emotive. A Perfect Circle frontman and lead vocalist Maynard James Keenan pushed Howerdel to sing lead vocals on a few of the songs on Emotive to "get people used to your voice", and to help Howerdel transition to a role of primary singer in his solo work. Once Emotive was completed, A Perfect Circle went into hiatus, and Howerdel centered his focus around his solo work.

However, not long after starting this up, video game developer Naughty Dog contacted him to provide music for their racing video game Jak X. Howerdel would work on writing music for both projects concurrently, with some material going to the game's soundtrack, and others going toward his own release. For Jak X, the company requested twenty songs, far more than he was personally able to supply, so he recruited a number of musicians to help both with his tracks, and to provide their own tracks, for the game, including prior A Perfect Circle bandmates members Paz Lenchantin, Troy Van Leeuwen, Danny Lohner, and Josh Freese. The tracks "Ascension", "Migraine", "Fracture", "The Chopper", and "Death From Above" were all pulled to be used for Jak X, while, conversely, "Denial Waits", originally written for Jak X, was saved for the album, as Howerdel had worked out an agreement with Naughty Dog that tracks could be switched as such.

Upon completing the soundtrack for Jak X, Howerdel turned back to fully focus on his solo album again. Progress on the album continued to be slow, as Howerdel continued to find it difficult to work without collaborators, as he had with the last two albums with Keenan in A Perfect Circle. Inspired by the help he received from the Jak X sessions, Howerdel searched out for more collaborations, choosing to place Lohner as a co-producer of the album. This helped the sessions, as he frequently encouraged Howerdel to simplify songs and help him make up his mind. Howerdel also collaborated with a few other musicians in writing songs as well, including Lenchantin on "Denial Waits", Johnette Napolitano on "Too Late", and Matt Skiba on "The Prey". All drums were performed by Freese as well, except for the track "Forever Can Be", which contains drumming by Dean Sainz. With Howerdel performing most of the album's multiple guitar and bass parts himself, Lenchantin and Van Leeuwen were brought in to test-perform songs in the studio, to see how they would sound in a full, live band setting, but these sessions were not used in the studio recordings. British music producer Alan Moulder, who had mixed A Perfect Circle album Mer de Noms, also mixed the album.

=== Sound and composition ===
Initially, Howerdel had intended to make an album vastly different from his work with A Perfect Circle, in fear that it sounding too similar would make it be perceived as a watered-down A Perfect Circle with a different lead singer. However, he found himself struggling, feeling his output to feel "forced" and not "genuine". While not deviating too far from A Perfect Circle's sound, Howerdel did make an effort to write songs at a faster tempo, while sounding "not so ominous". He summarized:

I'm doing the same thing I've always done, which is writing songs from the heart, doing what comes naturally to me and writing songs that wouldn't be hard to fit into the A Perfect Circle mold. In the beginning, when I started writing this stuff, I set out to do something very different. But if this is going to be my main focus, I want it to be what feels really right to me, and not just a side project or whatever you want to call it. It's not a huge departure. It just feels like I'm working on music the way I always have, with the difference being I don't have my partner Maynard coming in and singing lyrics over it; I'll be doing all the singing. It feels a bit lonely right now, because you get used to something and you want to go back to that comfort space. This is making me look at music in a different way."

== Release and promotion ==
Initial plans included releasing the album by the end of 2006, though sessions took Howerdel longer than expected to finish. The album remain untitled through early 2008, until it was announced to be Keep Telling Myself It's Alright. The album was released on April 8, 2008. The album debuted at number 36 in the United States, selling 15,800 copies in its first week. As of August 2008, it had sold 61,000 copies to date according to Nielsen SoundScan.

Howerdel assembled a live band to tour in support of the album, including Jonathan Radtke on guitar, Matt McJunkins on bass, Adam Monroe on keyboard, and Jeff Friedl on drums. The band was featured on Linkin Park's Projekt Revolution 2008 tour, performing on the main stage. Singles released in promotion of the album included "The Stone" and "Enemies". "The Stone" performed well at rock radio, peaking at number 7 and 10 respectively on the Billboard Mainstream Rock and Modern Rock charts, though "Enemies" failed to chart on either.

== Reception ==
Professional ratings
Review scores
Source	Rating
411mania.com	8/10 stars
AllMusic	3/5 stars
CraveOnline	7.5/10 stars
TuneLab Music	6/10 stars

Reception for the album was generally positive, with critics both praising and criticizing the works for sounding similar to A Perfect Circle. AllMusic had mixed feelings on the album, describing it as an "...ambitious and artistic work that mixes pensive lyrics with equally melancholy melodies. Unfortunately, it is also a decidedly hit or miss affair, alternating between aggression and melancholy in a mix that doesn't always work", and concluding that "his ability to create such an atmospheric work is impressive" but that "Instead of exploring new territory, he seems content in revisiting old successes". CraveOnline praised it for going against the grain of stereotypical modern rock, stating that "With so many younger musicians going the route of vacant, stripped down party music, it's shocking to hear something so artfully composed. Thankfully, Island Records has resisted the temptation to over-produce the hell out of Keep Telling Myself It’s Alright and has allowed a talented musician to deliver an album that captures the intelligent side of 80s nostalgia for once."

== Track listing ==
All tracks are written by Billy Howerdel, except where noted.

No.	Title	Length
1.	"Stripped Away"	3:43
2.	"Denial Waits" (Billy Howerdel / Paz Lenchantin)	3:35
3.	"Too Late" (Billy Howerdel / Johnette Napolitano)	3:59
4.	"Forever Can Be"	4:48
5.	"Defamed"	3:38
6.	"Enemies"	3:17
7.	"A Wish"	2:53
8.	"Ritual"	3:55
9.	"The Stone"	3:48
10.	"The Prey" (Billy Howerdel / Matt Skiba)	4:26
11.	"Sword"	6:29
Total length:		44:31

iTunes bonus track
No.	Title	Length
12.	"Denial Waits" (Danny Lohner Remix)	4:09
Total length:		48:40

Import release bonus track
No.	Title	Length
12.	"Sword" (Danny Lohner Remix)	3:34
Total length:		48:05

== Personnel ==
Credits adapted by album liner notes.

- Billy Howerdel − guitar, vocals, keyboard, bass
- Josh Freese – drums

Additional musicians

- Devo Keenan – cello on "Sword"
- Danny Lohner – additional programming on "Forever Can Be" and "Ritual"

Production

- Billy Howerdel – production, sound engineering
- Danny Lohner – production
- Johnette Napolitano – vocal production on "The Stone", "The Prey", and "Sword", co-writer on "Too Late"
- Matt Skiba – vocal production, co-writer on "The Prey"
- Paz Lenchantin – co-writer on "Denial Waits"
- Alan Moulder – mixing
- Bob Ludwig – mastering

== Charts ==
Chart (2008)	Peak position
US Billboard 200	36
