= Coretta Scott =

Coretta Scott may refer to:

- Coretta Scott (band), a rock band from Spokane, Washington
- Coretta Scott King, née Coretta Scott, American author, activist, and civil rights leader.
