= The Outsider (song) =

2004 single by A Perfect Circle

Single by A Perfect Circle

from the album Thirteenth Step
- Released: November 17, 2003
- Length: 4:06
- Label: Virgin
- Songwriters: Maynard James Keenan; Billy Howerdel
- Producers: Billy Howerdel; Maynard James Keenan (executive)

A Perfect Circle singles chronology
"Weak and Powerless" (2003)	"The Outsider" (2003)	"Blue" (2004)

"The Outsider" is a song by American rock supergroup A Perfect Circle, released as the second single from their second album, Thirteenth Step, in November 2003. The song charted on the US Billboard Hot 100, as well as the Billboard Mainstream Rock Tracks and Modern Rock Tracks charts in 2004.

== Background ==
"The Outsider" uses a 6/8 and 4/4 time signature. Two remixes of the song were made for aMOTION. James Iha made the "Frosted Yogurt mix", which uses a much more toned-down, quiet, synthesized sound than the original. Danny Lohner's "Apocalypse Mix" is a darker, heavier version that starts as an ambient doomscape and ends in a way that resembles a music-playback program crashing. The latter version was included in the soundtrack to the movie Resident Evil: Apocalypse under the title "Resident Renholder Mix" and also in the Prison Break soundtrack under the title "Apocalypse mix". The "Resident Renholder Mix" of the song was featured in the premiere trailer for Resident Evil: Afterlife. It is also featured in the film during the Alice vs. Albert Wesker battle and the ending credits. Additionally, the song is in the video game Guitar Hero: Warriors of Rock and the trailer for the movie Safe.

The lyrics to "The Outsider" at face value, are in judgment of a potentially self-destructive or suicidal individual, though Maynard clarified that the song's message was meant to be a criticism of people who do not understand the struggles of people dealing with depression, saying:

"[In] the case of "The Outsider", it's sung from the perspective of a person who doesn't understand at all what their friend is going through, what their loved one is going through, and they think that it's more like a sprained ankle; they can just kind of walk it off."

== Track listing ==
DVD single

No.	Title	Length
1.	"The Outsider" (audio)	4:06
2.	"Weak and Powerless" (music video)	3:17

== Charts ==
=== Weekly charts ===
Weekly chart performance for "The Outsider"
Chart (2004)	Peak position
US Billboard Hot 100	79
US Mainstream Rock Tracks (Billboard)	3
US Modern Rock Tracks (Billboard)	5

=== Year-end charts ===
Year-end chart performance for "The Outsider"
Chart (2004)	Position
US Mainstream Rock Tracks (Billboard)	15
US Modern Rock Tracks (Billboard)	21
