= Weak and Powerless =

2003 single by A Perfect Circle

Single by A Perfect Circle

from the album Thirteenth Step
- Released: August 4, 2003
- Studio: Perfect Circle (North Hollywood, California)
- Length: 3:15
- Label: Virgin
- Songwriters: Maynard James Keenan; Billy Howerdel
- Producers: Billy Howerdel; Maynard James Keenan (executive)

A Perfect Circle singles chronology
| "The Hollow" (2001) | "Weak and Powerless" (2003) | "The Outsider" (2003) |

Music video
- "Weak and Powerless" on YouTube

"Weak and Powerless" is a song by American rock band A Perfect Circle. It was released as the lead single from their second album, Thirteenth Step. The song became their highest-charting single, topping the US Billboard Mainstream Rock Tracks and Modern Rock Tracks charts. A remix of the song was featured in the Underworld soundtrack.

== Music video ==
The music video, directed by the Brothers Strause, features a nude woman with long, white hair, as seen in various artwork for the album, crawling through the woods, collecting various reptiles, and throwing them into an amblypygi -filled pit. The commentary by Maynard James Keenan provided for the video stated the model's name as Tonya, a woman who had never done this type of work before. There are two versions of the video; edited and unedited. In the unedited version the woman's breast and pelvic areas are clearly visible. These areas of the body are darkened and blurred for the television version and the scenes are sped up. Various camera and computer effects are used throughout the video. The video saw significant airplay upon release and is included on the aMOTION DVD/CD. The end of the video features a barely audible shampoo commercial.

== Remixes ==
One of the most prominent aspects of "Weak and Powerless" is its various layers of clean guitars and vocals, which build the relatively soft yet highly active verse into a powerful chorus. A remix of the song was made, entitled "Weak and Powerless (Tilling My Grave Mix)" and featuring instrumentation by Danny Lohner, Wes Borland, and Josh Eustis. This version is significantly heavier than the album version and was featured in the soundtrack to Underworld. Borland told Cleveland Radio station 100.7 The Buzzard in an interview at the time of the soundtrack's promotion that he and Lohner wrote the remix by putting the song up in Pro Tools and stripping away everything but Maynard's vocals, leaving the three of them to write new music around the vocals.

== Track listings ==
US single

| No. | Title | Length |
|---|---|---|
| 1. | "Weak and Powerless" | 3:15 |
| 2. | "Blue" (Bird Shake mix) | 3:55 |

Canadian and European single

| No. | Title | Length |
|---|---|---|
| 1. | "Weak and Powerless" | 3:15 |
| 2. | "Crimes" | 2:35 |

7-inch single

Side A
| No. | Title | Length |
|---|---|---|
| 1. | "Weak and Powerless" | 3:15 |

Side B
| No. | Title | Length |
|---|---|---|
| 1. | "Weak and Powerless" (Tilling My Grave mix) | 3:02 |

== Charts ==
=== Weekly charts ===
Weekly chart performance for "Weak and Powerless"
| Chart (2003) | Peak position |
|---|---|
| US Billboard Hot 100 | 61 |
| US Mainstream Rock Tracks (Billboard) | 1 |
| US Modern Rock Tracks (Billboard) | 1 |

=== Year-end charts ===
2003 year-end chart performance for "Weak and Powerless"
| Chart (2003) | Position |
|---|---|
| US Mainstream Rock Tracks (Billboard) | 25 |
| US Modern Rock Tracks (Billboard) | 22 |

2004 year-end chart performance for "Weak and Powerless"
| Chart (2004) | Position |
|---|---|
| US Modern Rock Tracks (Billboard) | 73 |
