= Corpus Christi (Angkor Wat album) =

Studio album by Angkor Wat
- Released: May 1990
- Recorded: December 1989
- Studio: Firestation, San Marcos, Texas
- Genre: Thrash metal
- Length: 48:37
- Label: Metal Blade
- Producer: Angkor Wat, Kerry Crafton

Angkor Wat chronology
When Obscenity Becomes the Norm...Awake! (1989)	Corpus Christi (1990)

Professional ratings
Review scores
Source	Rating
AllMusic	2/5 stars

Corpus Christi is the second studio album by American thrash metal band Angkor Wat, released in 1990 by Metal Blade Records.

== Track listing ==
All tracks are written by Angkor Wat, except "Barracuda" by Heart

No.	Title	Length
1.	"Indestructible: Innocence 1990"	1:55
2.	"Corpus Christi"	4:44
3.	"Turn of the Screw"	5:02
4.	"Golden"	5:46
5.	"Anne Marie"	3:46
6.	"Birdsong (Earth)"	2:43
7.	"Ordinary Madness"	7:34
8.	"Sinking"	3:25
9.	"Schizophrenic"	4:09
10.	"Barracuda"	3:36
11.	"Sour Born"	6:02

== Personnel ==
Adapted from the Corpus Christi liner notes.

Angkor Wat

- Adam Grossman – vocals, guitar, bass guitar, sampler
- Jimmy Lindsey – sampler
- Danny Lohner – guitar, bass guitar, sampler
- Tony Maingot – sampler, programming (1)
- Dave Nuss – drums

Production and additional personnel

- Angkor Wat – production
- Kerry Crafton – production
- Gary Higinbotham – engineering
- Don Seay – piano (7)
- Mike Soliz – lead vocals (10)

== Release history ==
Region	Date	Label	Format	Catalog
United States	1990	Metal Blade	CD, CS, LP	ZORRO 5
United Kingdom	1990	Restless	CD	72430
