= The Entrance Band (album) =

Studio album by the Entrance Band
- Released: September 1, 2009
- Genre: Psychedelic rock, blues
- Label: Ecstatic Peace
- Producer: Nadav Eisenman

The Entrance Band chronology
Prayer of Death (2006)	The Entrance Band (2009)	Book of Changes (2017)

Professional ratings
Aggregate scores
Source	Rating
Metacritic	44/100
Review scores
Source	Rating
Rolling Stone	3.5/5 stars
Pitchfork	2.2/10
PopMatters	5/10
Spin	3/5 stars
Tiny Mix Tapes	1.5/5 stars
Under the Radar	4/10

The Entrance Band is the first album by the Entrance Band, which is the full-band version of the act previously named Entrance; it is this act's fourth album overall.

== Track listing ==
- All songs were written by Guy Blakeslee
1. "Lookout! - 3:31
2. "M.L.K." - 5:09
3. "Still Be There" - 4:37
4. "Sing For the One" - 4:09
5. "You're So Fine" - 6:11
6. "Grim Reaper Blues (Pt. 2)" - 6:45
7. "That is Why" - 3:42
8. "Lives" - 4:55
9. "You Must Turn" - 7:21
10. "Hourglass" - 6:18

== Personnel ==
- Guy Blakeslee - vocals, guitar
- Paz Lenchantin - violin, bass guitar, vocals
- Derek James - drums, percussion
