= Kaura (band) =

American alternative rock band

- Origin: Berkeley, California, United States
- Genres: Modern rock Alternative; Progressive rock
- Years active: 2005–present
- Labels: Kaum Records,
- Members: Malcolm Guess; Benjamin Jones; Benjamin Rojas; Yosh!
- Website: kaura.com

Kaura is an American, progressive, alternative rock band from Los Angeles, California.

Kaura is a band formed in 2005 by Malcolm Guess and Benjamin Jones. The band has been invited to open for the likes of Tool, Rob Zombie, and Entrance Band by Bill Graham Presents in San Francisco. The band's sound is recognizable by its trademark use of ancient instruments like Hammered Dulcimer, Indonesian Gamelan, and Indian Tabla as well as delayed guitars, and an epic and aggressive sound. The band self-released a debut EP in 2005 which featured Paz Lenchantin from A Perfect Circle and Zwan on the track Dividing Lines. Guitarist Ben Rojas joined the band shortly after the band's first EP was recorded and after several bassists, Joshua Albright became a permanent member of the band.

Kaura released their first full-length album in Sept of 2011 which was packaged with a DVD that included two new music videos and an hour long making of the album documentary. Assisting in the creation of the album were notable engineers/mixers such as Sylvia Massy, known for her work with Tool, System of a Down, and Rick Rubin among others., Ken Andrews of the band's Failure and Year of the Rabbit, Alex Newport known for his work with At the Drive In, The Mars Volta, and his own band Fudge Tunnel. The artwork was created by Bay Area artist David Ho Most of the album however was produced and mixed by Kaura's singer and guitarist Malcolm Guess.

Shortly following the release of their full-length album, Kaura successfully funded the making of an acoustic CD/DVD titled "The Acoustic Sessions", by the use of their Kickstarter.com campaign. Production of "The Acoustic Sessions" was completed in January 2012 and is set to be released in March 2012. "The Acoustic Sessions" features songs from both Kaura's Self Titled EP and their full-length album as well as one unreleased song.

In the summer of 2011 Kaura also worked with film director Seda James, writing the end credits song "Awakening the Seed" for his short film titled Subject 7. With strong support for its film festival debut, the full length continuum titled Subject 6 is slated for production over the next 2 years; of which "Awakening the Seed" is intended to be included in.

Kaura is currently self managed and signed to their own record label, Kaum Records.
