= Angkor Wat (band) =

American thrash metal band

Background information
- Origin: Corpus Christi, Texas, U.S.
- Genres: Crossover thrash; thrash metal
- Years active: 1986–1990; 2018–present
- Label: Metal Blade
- Spinoffs: Skrew
- Members: Dave Brinkman; Mike Trevino; David Nuss; W.M. Titsworth
- Past members: Adam Grossman; Danny Lohner

Angkor Wat is an American thrash metal/crossover band from Corpus Christi, Texas. Named after the Hindu-then-Buddhist temple complex, they were forerunners of the hardcore punk scene that emerged from Corpus Christi in the mid-eighties.

== History ==
Angkor Wat was formed in 1986 by Adam Grossman, Danny Lohner, Dave Brinkman and Mike Trevino. Dave Nuss and Mike Titsworth joined the band in 1986 and 1987, respectively, following Trevino's departure. The band's energetic live performances along with their unique blend of thrash metal and hardcore punk landed a deal with Death Records, a subsidiary of Metal Blade Records, under which they released two albums. A third album was recorded under the name Angkor Wat, but due to the stylistic difference from the band's previous work Lohner opted to release it as Skrew's debut.

On June 1, 2018, the band played a reunion show at the House of Rock in Corpus Christi. The following day, they were honored with a star on the South Texas Music Walk of Fame in the Water Street Market. In late 2018 the band embarked upon a mini-tour in Texas with The Accused AD and remains active according to their website.

== Aftermath ==
In 1990, Adam Grossman and Danny Lohner relocated to Austin and continued their musical partnership under the name Skrew, a project that had industrial music leanings. Lohner later became known for his collaborations with acts such as Nine Inch Nails, Rob Zombie, Marilyn Manson, and A Perfect Circle.

== Discography ==
Studio albums

- When Obscenity Becomes the Norm...Awake! (1989, Metal Blade)
- Corpus Christi (1990, Metal Blade)

Compilations

- When Obscenity Becomes the Norm...Awake!/Corpus Christi (1995, Metal Blade)
