= Danny Lohner =

American musician

- Also known as: Renholdër, Castle Renholdër
- Born: Daniel Patrick Lohner; December 13, 1970 (age 55)
- Genres: Alternative rock; electro-industrial; electronica; post-punk; heavy metal
- Occupations: Musician, producer
- Instruments: Guitar, bass guitar, keyboards, vocals
- Years active: 1987–present
- Formerly of: Nine Inch Nails; Angkor Wat; Skrew; Puscifer; Hollywood Undead; A Perfect Circle; Tapeworm; The Damning Well; Black Light Burns; Methods of Mayhem; Lamb

Daniel Patrick Lohner (born 13 December 1970), also known as Renholdër, is an American musician and record producer best known for his work with Nine Inch Nails and A Perfect Circle. In 2020, he was inducted into the Rock and Roll Hall of Fame as a member of Nine Inch Nails.

Before joining Nine Inch Nails as a live bassist and keyboardist, Lohner co-founded the crossover thrash band Angkor Wat and the industrial thrash band Skrew. He has also performed on releases by Marilyn Manson, Rob Zombie, Tommy Lee's band Methods Of Mayhem, Wes Borland's Black Light Burns project, A Perfect Circle co-founder Billy Howerdel's solo projects, Tool/A Perfect Circle frontman Maynard James Keenan's Puscifer project, Japanese musician Hyde, and Hollywood Undead.

He has produced albums for Trust Company, Korn guitarist James "Munky" Shaffer's solo project Fear and the Nervous System, Howerdel, Black Light Burns, Hollywood Undead, and Pentakill. He also produced the soundtrack for the film Underworld.

His most recent work includes live performances and production for solo projects from Howerdel, Rammstein singer Till Lindemann and NOFX members Fat Mike and Eric Melvin.

== Career ==
=== Early work ===
Danny Lohner co-founded the crossover thrash band Angkor Wat in Corpus Christi, Texas in 1986 while he was still in high school. The band released two albums, When Obscenity Becomes the Norm...Awake! (1989) and Corpus Christi (1990), on Metal Blade Records.

After moving to Austin, Lohner and Angkor Wat frontman Adam Grossman recorded a new album with an industrial metal sound. They decided to release it under the name Skrew since most of the other members of Angkor Wat had left by that point and the new material was such a departure from their hardcore roots. The first Skrew album, Burning in Water, Drowning In Flame, was produced by Revolting Cocks and Skatenigs member Phildo Owen and engineered by Paul Barker and Al Jourgensen of Ministry. It was released on Metal Blade in 1991. Lohner left Skrew in 1994.

=== Nine Inch Nails ===
Lohner has said Nine Inch Nails was his favorite band and he wanted to be involved in any way possible. He called then Nine Inch Nails manager John Malm Jr. and asked to work with the band, possibly as a guitar tech. While recording with Skrew in Chicago, Lohner also met former Nine Inch Nails drummer Chris Vrenna, who was in town working with Die Warzau, and enlisted the help of Al Jourgensen's then-wife and manager Patty Jourgensen to help him write a letter to Nine Inch Nails front man Trent Reznor.

Lohner landed an audition in 1993 to replace live guitarist Richard Patrick, who had just left the band. Reznor instead decided to hire Robin Finck for the role, but hired Lohner as a live bassist and keyboard player. Lohner provided additional guitar on "Big Man With a Gun" on The Downward Spiral and performed live with the band throughout the touring cycle for the album. He appeared in the video for "March of the Pigs" and on the Closure video compilation.

After touring for The Downward Spiral ended, Lohner co-wrote the Nine Inch Nails song "The Perfect Drug", which appeared on the Lost Highway soundtrack and as a single. Lohner formed a side project called Tapeworm with Reznor and then Nine Inch Nails keyboardist Charlie Clouser. The idea was to create an outlet for ideas that didn't quite fit with Nine Inch Nails and to give Lohner and Clouser more democratic roles where they could act as equals to Reznor. Various guest musicians reportedly worked with Tapeworm, including Tool singer Maynard James Keenan, Pantera singer Phil Anselmo, and Helmet frontman Page Hamilton. Although the band is said to have recorded several songs, none of this material has been released. However, two songs that began as Tapeworm songs were re-recorded and released by two of Keenan's other projects: "Passive" by A Perfect Circle and "Potions" by Puscifer.

Lohner contributed guitar to several songs on the Nine Inch Nails album The Fragile, and co-wrote the songs "Somewhat Damaged" and "The Great Below". He again toured with the band as live bassist and keyboardist to support the album, and can be heard on the And All That Could Have Been live album. He co-wrote the song "And All That Could Have Been" from the accompanying album Still.

Lohner left Nine Inch Nails on good terms before the recording of With Teeth. He made a guest appearance with Nine Inch Nails during the Wave Goodbye Tour in 2009. He also performed alongside NIN alumni Chris Vrenna, Charlie Clouser, and Richard Patrick at a show in Cleveland, Ohio in 2022.

In 2020 Danny Lohner was inducted into the Rock and Roll Hall of Fame as a part of Nine Inch Nails.

=== A Perfect Circle ===
Lohner is frequently credited under the pseudonym Renholdër, an in-joke backward spelling of "Re: D. Lohner". This began as a result of the song titled "Renholdër" on A Perfect Circle's debut album Mer de Noms in 2000. Lohner did not work on this song but was later told by guitarist Billy Howerdel that the song was about him.

In early 2003, A Perfect Circle announced that Lohner would replace Troy Van Leeuwen as the band's second guitarist. Lohner played guitar on one track on band's second release, Thirteenth Step, and received additional production credit on a few others, but he did not tour with the band to support the album. He was replaced by ex-Smashing Pumpkins guitarist James Iha.

Lohner returned to A Perfect Circle and contributed heavily to the band's 2004 album, eMOTIVe. This release was mostly a collection of cover songs, but it also included a continuation of "Pet" from Thirteenth Step. The album also includes an original work titled "Passive", which was the final version of a song originally composed for Tapeworm. This track subsequently appeared on the soundtrack of the film Constantine.

A two disc companion to eMOTIVe called aMOTION was released in 2004, featuring a CD of remixes and a DVD of music videos and live material. The remix album included Lohner's remixes of "3 Libras", "Judith", "Weak and Powerless", and "The Outsider". Lohner was credited as a band member on both eMOTIVe and aMOTION .

Lohner has continued to work with members of A Perfect Circle. He co-produced Howerdel's 2008 solo album Keep Telling Myself It's Alright (recorded under the name ASHES dIVIDE), contributed to a few tracks on Howerdel's 2022 solo album What Normal Was, and joined the guitarist on his 2022 tour. He has also worked on Maynard James Keenan's Puscifer project.

=== Underworld soundtrack, Black Light Burns, Puscifer ===
In 2003 Lohner produced the Underworld film soundtrack. He composed and recorded many of the songs on the soundtrack himself under the name "Renholder". Many of the other tracks are collaborations with various friends and connections in the music industry. Lohner remixed the David Bowie song "Bring Me the Disco King" with additional vocals by Maynard James Keenan and additional guitars by Red Hot Chili Peppers guitarist John Frusciante. Another collaboration between Lohner and Keenan, "REV 22:20", appeared on the soundtrack under the name Puscifer, which Keenan and Tool bandmate Adam Jones had previously used as the name of a joke band in an episode of Mr. Show.

Lohner also worked with Richard Patrick of Filter, Wes Borland of Limp Bizkit and Black Light Burns, and Josh Freese of A Perfect Circle and Nine Inch Nails, on music for the soundtrack using the band name The Damning Well. Only one song, "Awakening", was released by the group on the soundtrack.

In 2005 and 2006, Lohner was involved further with Borland in a project called Black Light Burns, taking on the role of producer as well as playing guitar, bass, synth, programming, and more. Other members included Josh Eustis of Telefon Tel Aviv and Josh Freese. The project was somewhat of a successor of the Damning Well, as it involved most of its members. According to Patrick, another Damning Well track, which originally featured Amy Lee of Evanescence on guest vocals, was reworked as "Coward" for Cruel Melody without Lee's vocals due to difficulties working with her manager.

Lohner didn't produce the soundtrack to the second Underworld film, but it did feature another Lohner/Keenan collaboration under the name Puscifer, "The Undertaker". He returned to produce the soundtrack for the third film, Rise of the Lycans, to which he contributed several remixes. The fourth film soundtrack features multiple Renholder remixes, but Lohner did not produce the soundtrack. He did not appear on the fifth film's soundtrack.

The first Puscifer album, "V" is for Vagina, was released in 2007 and featured "REV 22:20" and "The Undertaker", but the rest of the album featured collaborations between Keenan and other artists. However, Lohner did continue to produce remixes for the project.

=== Other projects ===
Lohner contributed to Marilyn Manson's 1996 album Antichrist Superstar, as did most of Nine Inch Nails. Lohner can be heard playing the acoustic guitar on '"The Reflecting God" and lead guitar on "Angel With the Scabbed Wings". Lohner also created a remix of the Eminem song "The Way I Am" featuring Manson and released on the song's single in 2002.

In 1998, Lohner contributed additional guitar and bass guitar to Rob Zombie's debut solo album Hellbilly Deluxe, which also featured fellow Nine Inch Nails member Charlie Clouser as a producer on the song "Superbeast". The next year Lohner played guitar on the self-titled debut album from Tommy Lee's Methods Of Mayhem.

NME reported in April 1999 that Everlast and Lohner had recorded a song about a school shooting that would not be released in light of the Columbine High School massacre. However, the song was released on the End of Days soundtrack later that year.

After longtime Metallica bassist Jason Newsted left the band and the subsequent recording of the St. Anger album, Lohner was one of a selected few musicians whom the band invited to audition for the empty bassist slot (producer Bob Rock had recorded the bass parts for the album). Although he did not join the band, he can be seen briefly in the documentary of the making of the album and general turmoil in the band during that period, Metallica: Some Kind of Monster.

Lohner did some of his first credited production work on Trust Company's first album The Lonely Position of Neutral, which was mixed by A Perfect Circle co-founder Billy Howerdel.

Lohner contributed additional guitar for some of Clouser's scores for the Saw films, as well as Clouser's score for the Resident Evil: Extinction film score. Lohner is also credited with sound design on the Grudge 2 soundtrack in 2006. Also that year, he worked with the Japanese rock artist HYDE, recording bass tracks along with Craig Adams on Hyde's album Faith.

Lohner played guitar and/or produced several songs on rap rock band Hollywood Undead's debut album Swan Songs, and co-wrote the songs "Sell Your Soul" and "Young" from the album. He also produced much of the band's live CD/DVD set Desperate Measures. Lohner continued to work with the band over the next few years, producing and co-writing "We Are" on their third album Notes From The Underground (2013), co-producing two tracks on their fourth album Day of the Dead (2015), and playing guitar and bass on "Pray (Put 'Em in the Dirt)" on their fifth album (2017).

Lohner also produced the debut album of the Californian heavy metal band Holy Grail's first album Crisis in Utopia (2010), Korn guitarist James "Munky" Shaffer's solo project Fear and the Nervous System's 2011 self-titled debut album, and Alkaline Trio and Blink-182 member Matt Skiba's 2012 album Babylon album from his project Matt Skiba And The Sekrets 2012. In 2014 he produced and mixed the song "The Hex Core" for the fictional League of Legends band Pentakill's album Smite and Ignite. He returned to the Pentakill project in 2017, providing both vocals and production to the song "The Hex Core mk-2".

In 2019, Lohner produced Fat Mike of NOFX's "Cokie the Clown" project's album You're Welcome and performed live on the mini-tour to support the album.

Other artists Lohner has worked with or remixed include Thirty Seconds to Mars, Angels & Airwaves, Dååth, Genghis Tron, Filter, Marion Raven, Secondhand Serenade, and Kat Von D.

=== Recent activity ===
Lohner contributed to A Perfect Circle bandmate Billy Howerdel's solo album What Normal Was in 2022, providing guitar on "Free and Weightless", plus programming on "Free and Weightless", "Ani", and "The Same Again". He joined Howerdel on his 2022 tour.

Lohner joined Rammstein singer Till Lindemann's project Lindemann as a live bassist for a performance at the Hell and Heaven festival in Mexico in December 2022, and subsequently toured with the singer in 2023. He also remixed a track on Eric Melvin of NOFX's solo album Rise of the Melvinator, released in May 2023.

== Songs by Renholdër ==
Song	Length	Soundtrack	Track
"Now I Know"	0:57	Underworld (2003)	5
"Down in the Lab"	1:46	Underworld (2003)	8
"Falling Through the Sky"	1:01	Underworld (2003)	13
"Death Dealer's Descent"	0:55	Underworld (2003)	17
"Kill with Me (Website Theme)"	3:54	Untraceable (2008)	12
"The List"	3:58	Pathology (2008)	1
"Concussive" (with Bassnectar)	4:35	League of Legends (2015)	-

== Remixes by Renholdër ==
- "Complications of the Flesh" – Nine Inch Nails from the "We're in This Together" single
- "Where Is Everybody? (Version)" – Nine Inch Nails from "Things Falling Apart"
- "Judith (Renholdër Mix)" – A Perfect Circle from aMotion" & Underworld
- "3 Libras (Feel My Ice Dub Mix)" – A Perfect Circle from "aMotion"
- "The Outsider (Apocalypse Mix)" – A Perfect Circle from "aMotion" & Resident Evil: Apocalypse
- "Weak and Powerless (Tilling My Grave Renholdër Mix)" (with Wes Borland) – A Perfect Circle from "aMotion" & Underworld
- "The Undertaker (Renholdër Mix)" – Puscifer from "Don't Shoot the Messenger" & Underworld: Evolution
- "Sour Grapes (Late for Dinner Mix)" – Puscifer from ""V" Is for Viagra. The Remixes"
- "Bring Me the Disco King (Danny Lohner Mix)" – David Bowie (featuring Maynard James Keenan and John Frusciante) from Underworld
- "Hole in the Earth (Renholdër Remix)" – Deftones from Underworld: Rise of the Lycans
- "Underneath the Stars (Renholdër Remix)" – The Cure (featuring Maynard James Keenan and Milla Jovovich) from Underworld: Rise of the Lycans
- "Nasty Little Perv (Renholdër Remix)" – Perry Farrell from Underworld: Rise of the Lycans
- "Over and Out (Renholdër Remix)" – Alkaline Trio from Underworld: Rise of the Lycans
- "Deathclub (Renholdër Remix)" – William Control (featuring Matt Skiba) (with Wes Borland) from Underworld: Rise of the Lycans
- "Board Up the House (Renholdër Remix)" – Genghis Tron from Underworld: Rise of the Lycans
- "Two Birds, One Stone (Renholdër Remix)" – Drop Dead, Gorgeous (with Wes Borland) from Underworld: Rise of the Lycans
- "Tick Tock Tomorrow (Renholdër Remix)" – From First to Last (with Wes Borland) from Underworld: Rise of the Lycans
- "The Way I Am (Danny Lohner Remix)" – Eminem (featuring Marilyn Manson) from "The Way I Am" and Without Me singles
- "Denial Waits/Sword (Danny Lohner Remixes)" – ASHES dIVIDE from "Keep Telling Myself It's Alright"
- "Everywhere I Go (Castle Renholder Mix)" – Hollywood Undead from "Desperate Measures"
- "Ice (Renholdër Remix)" – LIGHTS from "The Ice Pack"
- "Made Of Stone (Renholdër Remix)" – Evanescence from the Underworld: Awakening (Original Motion Picture Soundtrack)
- "Blackout (Renholdër Remix)" – Linkin Park from the Underworld: Awakening (Original Motion Picture Soundtrack)
- "Apart (Renholdër Remix)" – The Cure from the Underworld: Awakening (Original Motion Picture Soundtrack)
- "Can't See You (featuring Renholder)" – Fake Shark from "See No Evil 2"
- "Watch Yourself (Renholdër Remix)" – Ministry from the Underworld: Awakening (Original Motion Picture Soundtrack)
- "Young Blood (Renholdër Remix)" – The Naked and Famous from the Underworld: Awakening (Original Motion Picture Soundtrack)
- "elisabeth addict (Remixed by Renholdër)" – sukekiyo from VITIUM limited edition second CD
- "Oni Przyszli (Danny Lohner Remix)" – Glaca from "ZANG"
