= The Stone (Ashes Divide song) =

Single by Ashes Divide

from the album Keep Telling Myself It's Alright
- Released: January 22, 2008 (Radio)
- Recorded: 2007
- Genre: Alternative rock
- Length: 3:49
- Label: Island
- Songwriter: Billy Howerdel
- Producer: Billy Howerdel

Ashes Divide singles chronology
"The Stone" (2008)	"Poison Flowers" (2022)

"The Stone" is a song by American band Ashes Divide and is their debut single from their debut album Keep Telling Myself It's Alright, which was released on April 8, 2008. The music video for the song was released in March.

== Background ==
"The Stone" is derived from a song composed by Billy Howerdel to be used in A Perfect Circle. An instrumental named "Army" has many similarities to "The Stone." It was recorded during demo sessions that yielded material from their first album, Mer de Noms. It would ultimately remain unreleased by A Perfect Circle and would find itself re-worked by Howerdel for years until it appeared in its final form on Keep Telling Myself It's Alright.

Howerdel said he had most of the verses written, but was stuck on the chorus, so he reached out to Johnette Napolitano, singer of Concrete Blonde, who wrote a few lines in the chorus, adding a "maternal" touch to it.

On the lyrics, Howerdel said, "It's this push-pull of protection, feeling the need or want to protect your loved ones in a way, but not being worthy enough with yourself to accept that same protection, that same kind of love. A lot of these songs are dealing with pushing people away, with not loving yourself enough to let somebody love you."

"The Stone" has been praised for its beat and guitar line.

== Track listing ==
1. "The Stone" - 3:49

== Chart performance ==
"The Stone" garnered attention from U.S. rock radio stations and has been regularly played on the airwaves. It peaked at No. 7 on the Billboard Mainstream Rock Tracks chart and No. 10 on the Modern Rock Tracks chart.

Chart (2008)	Peak position
U.S. Mainstream Rock Tracks (Billboard)	7
U.S. Modern Rock Tracks (Billboard)	10
