= When Obscenity Becomes the Norm...Awake! =

Studio album by Angkor Wat
- Released: April 1989
- Recorded: September–October 1988
- Studio: Austin Recording Studios, Austin, Texas
- Genre: Thrash metal
- Length: 38:52
- Label: Metal Blade
- Producer: Angkor Wat, Kerry Crafton

Angkor Wat chronology
When Obscenity Becomes the Norm...Awake! (1989)	Corpus Christi (1990)

Professional ratings
Review scores
Source	Rating
AllMusic	2/5 stars

When Obscenity Becomes the Norm...Awake! is the debut studio album by American thrash metal band Angkor Wat, released in April 1989 by Metal Blade Records.

== Track listing ==
No.	Title	Writer(s)	Length
1.	"Innocence '89"	Adam Grossman, Danny Lohner, Dave Nuss	4:29
2.	"Something to Cry About"	Adam Grossman, Danny Lohner, Dave Nuss	2:28
3.	"Seat of Power"	Adam Grossman, Danny Lohner, Dave Nuss	2:30
4.	"Prolonged Agony/Ricky"	David Brinkman, Adam Grossman	4:10
5.	"The Search"	Adam Grossman, Danny Lohner, Dave Nuss	3:23
6.	"Awake!"	Adam Grossman, Danny Lohner, Dave Nuss	0:47
7.	"Under Lock and Key"	David Brinkman, Adam Grossman	4:04
8.	"Emotional Blackmail"	David Brinkman, Adam Grossman	3:02
9.	"Warsaw"	David Brinkman, Adam Grossman	4:12
10.	"Died Young"	David Brinkman, Adam Grossman	2:30
11.	"Circus of Horrors/Civilized"	David Brinkman, Adam Grossman	7:12

== Personnel ==
Adapted from the album's liner notes.

Angkor Wat

- David Brinkman – vocals
- Adam Grossman – guitar, illustrations, design, photography
- Danny Lohner – guitar
- Dave Nuss – drums, design
- Mike Titsworth – bass guitar

Production and additional personnel

- Angkor Wat – production
- Kerry Crafton – production, engineering, design
- Wendy – design

== Release history ==
Region	Date	Label	Format	Catalog
United States	1989	Metal Blade	CD, LP	51155
