= Judith (A Perfect Circle song) =

2000 song by A Perfect Circle

Single by A Perfect Circle

from the album Mer de Noms
- Released: April 10, 2000
- Studio: Sound City (Van Nuys, California)
- Genre: Hard rock; industrial rock
- Length: 4:07
- Label: Virgin
- Songwriters: Billy Howerdel; Maynard James Keenan
- Producer: Billy Howerdel

A Perfect Circle singles chronology
| "Judith" (2000) | "3 Libras" (2000) |

Music video
- "Judith" on YouTube

"Judith" is a song by American rock band A Perfect Circle. It was released as the lead single from their debut album, Mer de Noms, on April 10, 2000.

Named after singer Maynard James Keenan's mother, the antireligious song questions her continued faith in the aftermath of her stroke.

== Background ==
Maynard Keenan explains on the Amotion DVD how the song is about his mother Judith Marie Keenan. She had a stroke and was reliant on a wheelchair for much of her life yet maintained her Christian faith, which he found incomprehensible.

== Composition ==
"Judith" features guitar riffs sliding over complex rhythms and breakdowns. The song's lyrics are deeply personal and express palpable anger. They touch on Maynard's mother, who became reliant on a wheelchair following a stroke, and have him conveying incredulity that she could still maintain her belief in God despite her suffering.

== Music video ==
The music video for "Judith" was directed by David Fincher, the director of Fight Club, Se7en, and music videos for Aerosmith, Madonna, and the Wallflowers. Allen Daviau was the cinematographer.

== Performances ==
A Perfect Circle performed "Judith" on Late Night with Conan O'Brien on May 16, 2000, less than a week before the release of Mer de Noms.

From 2004 to 2018, the song was very rarely played live.

== Track listing ==
1. "Judith" – 4:03
2. "Magdalena" (live) – 4:15
3. "Breña" (live) – 4:04
4. "Orestes" (demo) – 3:24

== Personnel ==
Personnel are adapted from the Mer de Noms liner notes

- Maynard James Keenan – lead vocals
- Billy Howerdel – vocals, guitar
- Josh Freese – drums
- Paz Lenchantin – bass, vocals

== Charts ==
=== Weekly charts ===
Weekly chart performance for "Judith"
| Chart (2000) | Peak position |
|---|---|
| Australia (ARIA) | 25 |
| New Zealand (Recorded Music NZ) | 34 |
| US Bubbling Under Hot 100 Singles (Billboard) | 5 |
| US Mainstream Rock Tracks (Billboard) | 4 |
| US Modern Rock Tracks (Billboard) | 5 |

=== Year-end charts ===
Year-end chart performance for "Judith"
| Chart (2000) | Position |
|---|---|
| US Mainstream Rock Tracks (Billboard) | 9 |
| US Modern Rock Tracks (Billboard) | 11 |

== See also ==
- 10,000 Days
