= Prayer of Death =

Studio album by Entrance
- Released: 2006
- Genre: Indie rock, blues
- Label: Tee Pee
- Producer: Guy Blakeslee, Paz Lenchantin

Entrance chronology
Wandering Stranger (2004)	Prayer of Death (2006)	The Entrance Band (2009)

Professional ratings
Review scores
Source	Rating
AllMusic	3.5/5 stars
Pitchfork Media	7.6/10

Prayer of Death is the third studio album by the band Entrance. It is the band's first release on Tee Pee Records. It was released in October 2006.

== Track listing ==
- All songs were written by Guy Blakeslee
1. "Grim Reaper Blues" – 4:29
2. "Silence on a Crowded Train" – 4:16
3. "Requiem for Sandy Bull (R.I.P.)" – 2:40
4. "Valium Blues" – 5:24
5. "Pretty Baby" – 6:38
6. "Prayer of Death" – 4:42
7. "Lost in the Dark" – 8:30
8. "Never Be Afraid!" – 3:47

== Personnel ==
- Guy Blakeslee – vocals, songwriter, guitar, producer
- Paz Lenchantin – violin, bass guitar, vocals, producer
- Derek James – drums, percussion
