= Tapeworm (band) =

Nine Inch Nails-associated side project

- Tapeworm as of 2002 (left to right): Maynard James Keenan, Danny Lohner, Atticus Ross, Trent Reznor

Background information
- Origin: United States
- Years active: 1995–2004
- Spinoff of: Nine Inch Nails
- Past members: See below

Tapeworm was an American side project of Nine Inch Nails which existed in various forms from 1995 to roughly 2004. Tapeworm never released any recordings, but was frequently referenced in interviews. The band started as a side-project between Nine Inch Nails frontman Trent Reznor and live-band members Danny Lohner and Charlie Clouser. Through the years the group expanded and evolved numerous times to include artists such as Maynard James Keenan, Atticus Ross, and Alan Moulder, effectively turning the project into a supergroup. After many years of rumors and expected release dates, Reznor announced the end of the project in 2004.

== History ==
Tapeworm's genesis occurred during Nine Inch Nails recording sessions following The Downward Spiral tours circa 1996. While working on Nine Inch Nails material, Danny Lohner and Charlie Clouser, both Nine Inch Nails live band members, would often come up with ideas that Reznor felt did not fit in with his vision for the band. Tapeworm developed as an outlet for this material—a democratic group in which Lohner and Clouser could act as equals with Reznor, as opposed to Nine Inch Nails, in which Reznor maintained sole artistic control.

As time went on, Tapeworm evolved into a supergroup, with guest musicians such as Maynard James Keenan, Page Hamilton, and Phil Anselmo recording material ostensibly to be used by the group. In 1999 Lohner reported that three tracks had been completed, and described the various materials featuring Anselmo as "heavy NIN-meets-Pantera" and "mellow Pink Floyd The Wall-type songs", and the material featuring Keenan as "psychedelic, groove-oriented verses and anthemic choruses." Tommy Victor recorded material with the band as well, and later told Rolling Stone that the continued delays on Tapeworm contributed to his decision to take a hiatus from music, as well as accusing Reznor of giving his Tapeworm guitar contribution to Marilyn Manson.

In a statement issued to MTV News, Reznor reflected on his collaborations with Keenan:

It has been an interesting experiment for Maynard and I to peek around in each other's heads, shining flashlights in some shadowy corners ... We've realized we're each in somewhat similar places in our respective lives and outlook, so it's been great to collaborate on that level.

By 2001, long-time Nine Inch Nails collaborator Alan Moulder had tracked "more than an album's worth" of demos. Moulder further described the rough tracks as "very unlike The Fragile" and were a deviation from most Nine Inch Nails material. By 2002, Clouser had left Nine Inch Nails and was no longer associated with Tapeworm. The group, which now consisted of Reznor, Lohner, Keenan, and Atticus Ross, booked time in a recording studio in hopes of producing an album. An official website, tapeworm.net (now offline), was created to showcase pictures from various recording sessions, including images of Josh Freese behind a drum kit.

In September 2003, Lohner told Kerrang! magazine that the album was "ready to mix" but had been held up by legal issues stemming from conflicts between Reznor and Keenan's record labels. The Tapeworm material was reported numerous times as completion neared, most notably by MTV News and Kerrang!, and was slated to be released on Reznor's Nothing Records label. Initial recording sessions for the band were staged in the Nothing Studios in New Orleans, though were later reported as being moved to Southern Tracks Studios in Atlanta, Georgia.

In 2004, Reznor announced that Tapeworm was "dead for the foreseeable future", citing label issues, Keenan's A Perfect Circle obligations, and Reznor's own waning enthusiasm for the project. Reznor summarized the project's demise by saying "the bottom line is this: if the music had been great, all of this probably could have been worked out." During an interview with digg founder Kevin Rose in 2009, Reznor further commented that he thought the material was not as good as could have been given his and Keenan's respective backgrounds and it was unlikely that the material would ever surface, but went on to say that he would like for the two of them to work together again at some point in the future.

== Contributors ==
Musicians who have been cited as recording material for Tapeworm, in alphabetical order:

- Dimebag Darrell (Pantera, Damageplan)
- Phil Anselmo (Pantera, Down, Superjoint Ritual)
- Charlie Clouser (Nine Inch Nails)
- Jerome Dillon (Nine Inch Nails)
- Robin Finck (Nine Inch Nails, Guns N' Roses)
- Josh Freese (Nine Inch Nails, A Perfect Circle, Devo, The Vandals)
- Toni Halliday (Curve)
- Page Hamilton (Helmet)
- Maynard James Keenan (Tool, A Perfect Circle, Puscifer)
- Danny Lohner (Nine Inch Nails, A Perfect Circle, Black Light Burns, Skrew)
- Alan Moulder (producer)
- Richard Patrick (Nine Inch Nails, Filter, Army of Anyone)
- Trent Reznor (Nine Inch Nails, How to Destroy Angels)
- Atticus Ross (Nine Inch Nails, 12 Rounds, Error, How to Destroy Angels)
- Erik Schrody (House of Pain)
- Tommy Victor (Prong, Danzig, Ministry)
- Chris Vrenna (Nine Inch Nails, Stabbing Westward, Die Warzau)
- Alexander Wilke-Steinhof (Atari Teenage Riot)

== Songs ==
Only two songs, "Vacant" and "Potions," have ever been identified as Tapeworm songs. Neither has been released, though cover versions by Maynard James Keenan's other projects have surfaced. The first, "Vacant" was initially conceived during the Tapeworm sessions; the track being written by Lohner and re-arranged by Clouser, with lyrics and melody by Keenan and chorus and backing vocals by Reznor. The song was first performed live by A Perfect Circle throughout their 2001 tour. MTV reported that Reznor was apparently not happy that Keenan performed the song: "I have to admit I find it mildly irritating for "Vacant" to debut in this fashion before feeling it has been properly realized," Shortly after the dissolution of the Tapeworm project, Keenan released a reworked version on A Perfect Circle's 2004 cover album Emotive under the title "Passive".

Another side-project of Maynard James Keenan, Puscifer, released an album titled "C" Is for (Please Insert Sophomoric Genitalia Reference HERE) with a song, "Potions (Deliverance Mix)," which had writing credits given to Trent Reznor.

In response to rumors that Keenan released a Tapeworm song without any changes made, a blog was posted on the home page of the main Puscifer website on November 18, 2009 saying that:

Ok. Let's use an APC album as an example. eMOTIVe. APC did a song called "Imagine." If you view the credits for the song you'll find various bits of info. Generally speaking the writers name appears in parentheses next to the track. The performer info may or may not be listed in the album credits. If you see performer info it may be broken down to instruments. For example ... "Billy Howerdel - Guitars and Back-up Vocals. Josh Freese - Drums and percussion, etc... Or it may be a given that the people who performed on this project/album/track are the band in question. So it will just say "B Howerdel - guitars, Josh Freese - drums, M J Keenan - vocals, etc. ... But Writing credits are different. Next to "Imagine" you'll see the name John Lennon. Because he wrote the song. You may want to sit down for the next bit. Ready? John Lennon didn't perform or sing or play on the APC version of "Imagine." He didn't produce it, direct it, co-produce it, or grab us Latte's during the recording of it. Why? Because he's dead. He just wrote it. And we performed a version of it. If you visit the Project Credits of this site now, you'll start to see what we mean. Hope that helps.

Later Keenan delved further into the issue on his Twitter account only nine hours after the initial blog had been posted. Keenan essentially confirmed the song's origins in the Tapeworm project while also confirming that the song was covered and released by Puscifer in the same fashion as A Perfect Circle did with "Passive," saying the following:

[To] conclude if [I] may. If [you] HATE Potions, hate US not Trent. We wrote it together, but PUSCIFER produced it. It was my wedding present [to] him.
