= Coretta Scott (band) =

American rock band

- Origin: Spokane, Washington, United States
- Genres: Rock, post-hardcore, pop rock
- Members: Preston Thomason; Ben Emery; Mike McClung; Joshua Albright
- Past members: Seth Woodward; Shayne Swenson; Aaron Posey

Coretta Scott is an American rock band from Spokane, Washington.

Coretta Scott were formed in 2003 in Spokane, Washington. While the band were part of the "Screamo" movement, they often shunned the "emo" title of the period onstage, in their music (specifically, the song Fashionably Depressed) and in interviews, often encouraging people to "remember what it was like to be happy and just love music.". The band was also known for their extensive touring in their active years, listing over 300 shows on their official site.

== Scream & Shout ==
After signing to Rise Records, the band released their album, Scream & Shout, in August 2005. The hype leading up to its release propelled the band to the #1 spot for most hits on the PureVolume charts, topping much larger Major label bands such as Fallout Boy, Taking Back Sunday and Emery. The album was also well received by critics, with reviews in from magazines like OutBurn, iTunes and favorable mentions in Alternative Press. Absolutepunk.net described the band as having "a gift for writing catchy tunes that won't leave your head for days."

== Red Delicious ==
Leaving the band a four-piece, original vocalist Seth Woodward left the band to focus on his side project "Paper Mache." The band continued on as a four-piece, With Albright on Vocals and Thomason left to sole Guitar duties. The new incarnation of the band represented a more stripped-down, raw sound. The ep Red Delicious was released in Spring of 2007 to mostly favorable reviews, although some were left confused with the change in direction of the band.

The band has been inactive since 2007, with sporadic shows happening in the following years for various causes. Thomason has since stayed busy with bands such as Striking Back and London Get Down. Vocalist Josh Albright moved to Los Angeles, and joined the band Kaura.
