= The Entrance Band =

American rock band

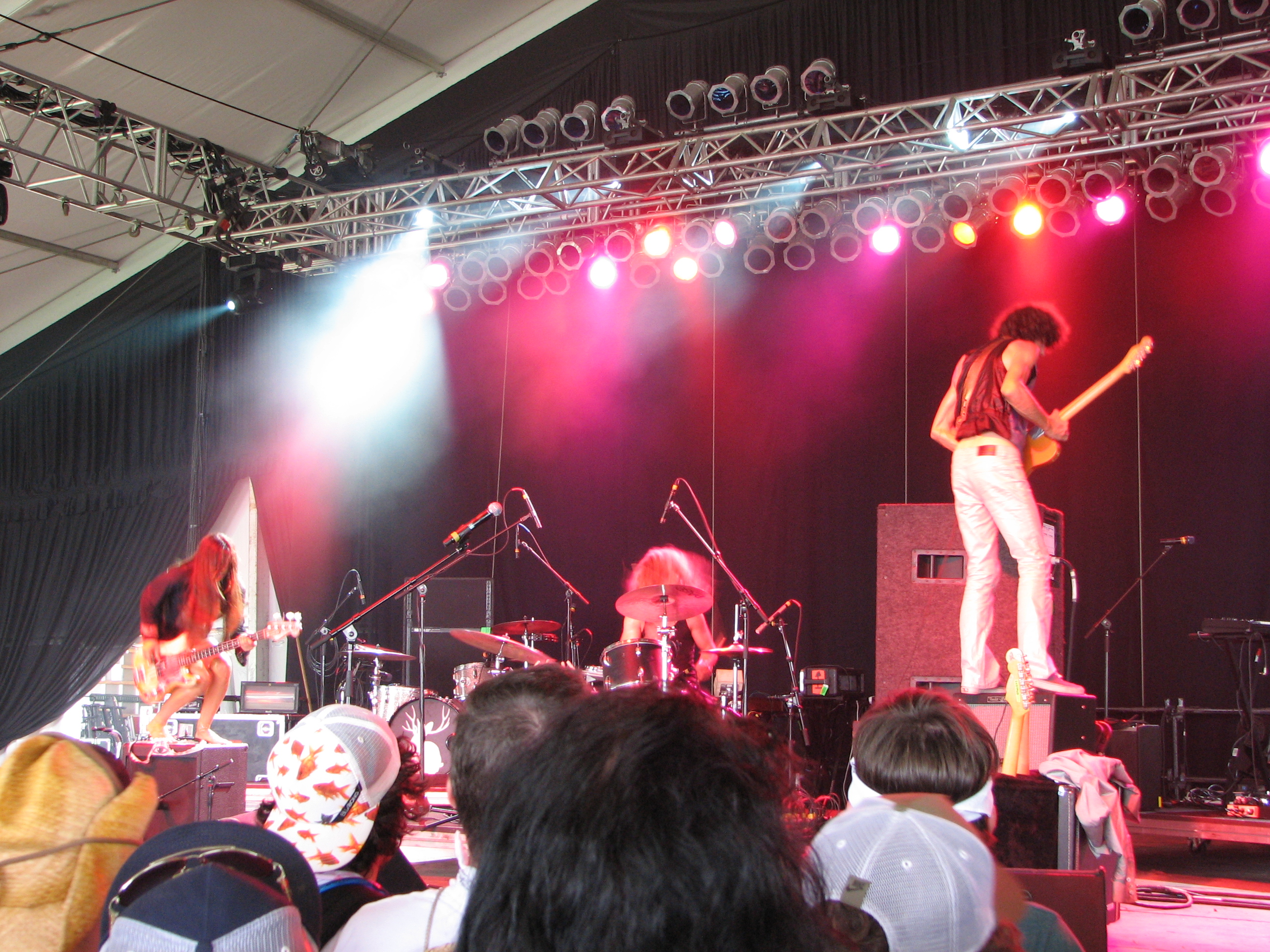
- The Entrance Band at Bonnaroo 2010

Background information
- Origin: Los Angeles, California
- Genres: Psychedelic rock, stoner rock
- Years active: 2006-present
- Members: Guy Blakeslee; Paz Lenchantin; Derek James

The Entrance Band (formerly called Entrance) is a band started by Guy Blakeslee (born April 29, 1981). Their style of music has been described as psychedelic rock or stoner rock.

Blakeslee was born and raised in Baltimore, Maryland, and first gained notice as a member of The Convocation Of.... He later left the band and moved to Chicago to pursue a solo career under the guise of the name Entrance. He performed regularly for the next 18 months at a bar called The Hideout, which eventually gained him the attention of Tiger Style Records.

Entrance toured with Sonic Youth, Devendra Banhart, Will Oldham, Stephen Malkmus and the Jicks, Yeah Yeah Yeahs, Dungen and Cat Power. Blakeslee has released his music through Tiger Style Records and Fat Possum Records, as well through his own record label, Entrance Records. The Entrance Band were chosen by Animal Collective to perform at the All Tomorrow's Parties festival that they curated in May 2011.

== Band members ==
- Guy Blakeslee
- Paz Lenchantin
- Derek James

== Discography ==
=== Albums ===
- The Kingdom of Heaven Must be Taken by Storm (2003) - Tiger Style Records
- Wandering Stranger (2004) - Fat Possum Records
- Prayer of Death (2006) - Entrance Records. Tee Pee Records
- The Entrance Band (2009) - Ecstatic Peace
- Face The Sun (2013) - Beyond Beyond is Beyond Records
- Book of Changes (2017) - Thrill Jockey

=== EPs ===
- Honey Moan (2003) - Tiger Style Records in United States/Careless Love (2003) - Sketchbook Records in UK & Europe.
- Latitudes (2012) - Latitudes
- Fine Flow (2012) - Spiritual Pajamas
- Dans La Tempeta (2013) - Spiritual Pajamas

=== Singles ===
- "See for Yourself" (2002) split 7-inch w/ Papa M - Tiger Style Records.
- "I Want You" b/w "A House is Not A Motel" (2011) - Black Tent Press
- "Not Gonna Say Your Name" (2017) - Self-released
