= Thirteenth Step =

Studio album by A Perfect Circle
- Released: September 16, 2003
- Recorded: January–June 2003
- Studio: Perfect Circle Studios (North Hollywood, California)
- Genres: Alternative metal; art rock; hard rock
- Length: 50:36
- Label: Virgin
- Producers: Billy Howerdel; Danny Lohner (tracks 3, 6, 9 and 10)

A Perfect Circle chronology
Mer de Noms (2000)	Thirteenth Step (2003)	Emotive (2004)

Singles from Thirteenth Step
- 1. "Weak and Powerless" Released: August 4, 2003; 2. "The Outsider" Released: November 17, 2003; 3. "Blue" Released: July 26, 2004

Thirteenth Step is the second studio album by American rock band A Perfect Circle, released on September 16, 2003. The album sold well, charting at the number 2 position on the Billboard 200 in its premiere week, selling over 231,000 copies and staying on the charts for 78 weeks. The album went on to be certified as gold on November 4, 2003, and as platinum on March 24, 2006, by the RIAA. Three singles were released from the album, "Weak and Powerless", which topped both the Mainstream Rock Tracks and Modern Rock Tracks, followed by "The Outsider" and "Blue", which also charted on the respective charts.

== Background ==
=== Writing and recording ===
The band's writing process was very different from the band's first album, Mer de Noms. With the first album, a majority of the album had been already written and recorded over a long period of time by guitarist Billy Howerdel, before a band had even been assembled. He had recorded it with a female vocalist in mind, but upon Tool vocalist Maynard James Keenan hearing it and offering to sing for the material, the content was then quickly finalized upon adding Keenan's vocals and re-recording the drums with band member Josh Freese. With beginning the second album, the band found themselves starting fresh, without any material to start with, with the exception of the track "Vanishing", which originally was intended to be on the band's first album, but Howerdel could not find the song file in the studio, having accidentally named it "test". Upon finally recovering the track in 2001, it was only slightly altered for its final release, to better match the eventual sound of Thirteenth Step. The title "Vanishing" was a tongue in cheek allusion to the fact that the song itself had gone missing.

Writing for the album started while Keenan was still touring with his other band, Tool, in support of their 2001 album Lateralus. Howerdel would write most of the music, while Keenan would write most of the lyrics. As such, Howerdel would send work in progress instrumental he would create, and Keenan would write lyrics in between shows, a process they found to be efficient, but ultimately more difficult to balance than they initially expected. Keenan's work with Tool was not the only thing delaying work on the album, as progress was also hampered by other lineup changes, including guitarist Troy Van Leeuwen leaving to be a member of Queens of the Stone Age, and bassist Paz Lenchantin leaving to be a member of Zwan, leading to their contributions to the album being limited to only a few tracks. Lenchantin would be replaced by Marilyn Manson bassist Jeordie White, while Van Leeuwen would be replaced by Danny Lohner on the album and later James Iha for touring purposes, as Iha did not actually perform on the album.

Once touring for Tool was over with, Keenan returned to the studio to work in person with the rest of the band on the album. The sessions were, as such, marked with far more collaboration, especially between Howerdel and Keenan, now that Howerdel knew who his vocalist was, and what types of ideas he'd support. At times, this would cause a creative struggle between the two as well; since Keenan was involved with some of Howerdel's music writing this time around, he would sometimes give more input in the music, with the two sometimes wanting to move in opposite directions. Keenan, in particular, wanted to move away from the general hard rock sound of Mer de Noms, feeling that taking that approach again would be "redundant". He instead pushed for a softer sound, focusing more on atmospherics and ambience. Conversely, Howerdel preferred the heavier compositions written while waiting for Keenan to return from Tool. White, relatively new to the band, often played the role of mediator between the two, being able to offer an outsider's perspective of the situation.

Danny Lohner played a large part of the productions of the track "The Noose", whereas "The Package" was a full-band collaboration that started with Howerdel playing the song's basic guitar riff in front of everyone.

=== Concept and themes ===
"I don't think the album is specifically for people who are going through recovery, although that metaphor is absolutely present. Many of the songs are sung from the perspectives of recovery: from the perspective of a person who is in denial about a loved one, and from the drug perspective itself — the perspective of a person who is starting to realize that there is an issue, and of a person who is ready to deal with it."
Lyricist Maynard James Keenan on the album's concept.

Thirteenth Step is a concept album about the different aspects and perspectives of addiction, and the recovery from it. The album's title itself is a reference to the 12 step program of Alcoholics Anonymous. Lead vocalist and primary lyricist of the band Maynard James Keenan explained the concept on the band's DVD Amotion, stating:

"The songs on Thirteenth Step for the most part are about the various processes of addiction, behavioral addictions, chemical addictions, and each song is kind of sung from a different perspective. I have a lot of friends who've gone through a lot of these situations. Some of the songs are sung from the perspective of the actual drug, from the perspective of someone who has realized that they have an issue or a problem, also from the perspective of a person who realizes that if they don't do something they're going to die, a song from the perspective of a person who is in denial about a loved one, dying right before their eyes. And in the case of "The Outsider", it's sung from the perspective of a person who doesn't understand at all what their friend is going through, what their loved one is going through, and they think that it's more like a sprained ankle; they can just kind of walk it off."

Keenan, not having struggled with addiction first-hand, drew from experiencing it happen to others around him, such as Layne Staley, the lead singer of Alice in Chains, who died in 2002 due to drug addiction. The song "The Package" is from the perspective of an addict, desperate for more, while "Blue" is from the perspective of someone having a difficult time dealing with the aftermath of an overdose.

"The Nurse Who Loved Me" is a cover of the song by Failure, originally featured on the 1996 album Fantastic Planet.

== Release and promotion ==
The album was released on September 16, 2003, and debuted at number 2 on the Billboard 200 charts, with 231,000 copies sold. Three singles were released from the album, "Weak and Powerless", which topped both the Mainstream Rock Tracks and Modern Rock Tracks, "The Outsider", and "Blue". "Weak and Powerless" and "The Outsider" managed to crossover into mainstream pop radio formats as well, with the two charting at number 61 and 79 respectively on the Billboard Hot 100 charts. The album was certified platinum by the RIAA in early 2006.

The band toured extensively for the rest of 2003 and in early 2004 in support of the album. Just prior to the 2004 Presidential Election, the band released Emotive, a collection of political war cover songs, which contained "Counting Bodies Like Sheep to the Rhythm of the War Drums", which was a reinterpretation of the track "Pet", and a remix album titled Amotion, which contained remixed versions of the tracks across their three albums, including the three singles from Thirteenth Step.

== Critical reception ==
Professional ratings
Aggregate scores
Source	Rating
Metacritic	74/100
Review scores
Source	Rating
AllMusic	4/5 stars
Alternative Press	5/5 stars
Drowned in Sound	(8/10)
E! Online	B+
Entertainment Weekly	3/4 stars
Kludge	(6/10)
Mojo	7/10
Q	6/10
Rolling Stone	3/5 stars
Spin	4/10

Media reception to Thirteenth Step was generally favorable; aggregating website Metacritic reported a rating of 74 percent based on 11 critical reviews. AllMusic strongly praised the album for having "the sound of a musical and lyrical maturity that normally doesn't occur until a band's third or fourth albums", and concluded that "Lyrically, musically, sonically, the Thirteenth Step is proof positive that mainstream rock has plenty of life and vision left in it."

== Track listing ==
All tracks are written by Maynard James Keenan and Billy Howerdel except where noted.

CD
No.	Title	Music	Length
1.	"The Package"		7:40
2.	"Weak and Powerless"		3:15
3.	"The Noose"		4:53
4.	"Blue"		4:13
5.	"Vanishing"		4:51
6.	"A Stranger"		3:12
7.	"The Outsider"		4:06
8.	"Crimes"	Howerdel; Keenan; Freese; White	2:34
9.	"The Nurse Who Loved Me" (Failure cover)	Ken Andrews; Greg Edwards	4:04
10.	"Pet"		4:34
11.	"Lullaby"		2:01
12.	"Gravity"	Howerdel; Freese; Van Leeuwen; Lenchantin	5:08
Total length:			50:36

Note

- The Japanese version of Thirteenth Step includes an exclusive extended version of "The Package" (9:23).

== Personnel ==
- Maynard James Keenan − lead vocals, executive producer, artwork direction
- Billy Howerdel − guitar, backing vocals, production, engineering
- Josh Freese − drums, backing vocals (on "Pet")
- Jeordie White − bass, backing vocals (on "Pet")
- Troy Van Leeuwen − guitar (on "The Package", "Vanishing" and "Gravity")
- Paz Lenchantin – strings (on "Gravity")
- Danny Lohner – guitar (on "The Noose"), additional production

Additional musicians

- The Section Quartet – strings (on "The Nurse Who Loved Me" and "A Stranger")
- Jarboe – vocals (on "The Noose" and "Lullaby")
- Devo H. Keenan – backing vocals (on "Pet")
- K. Patrick Warren – instrumentation on "The Nurse Who Loved Me"
- Jon Brion – instrumentation on "The Nurse Who Loved Me"

Production

- Steve Duda – digital engineering assistance
- Andy Wallace – mixing

== Charts ==
=== Weekly charts ===
Chart (2003)	Peak position
Australian Albums (ARIA)	3
Austrian Albums (Ö3 Austria)	33
Belgian Albums (Ultratop Flanders)	44
Belgian Albums (Ultratop Wallonia)	32
Canadian Albums (Billboard)	1
Danish Albums (Hitlisten)	24
Dutch Albums (Album Top 100)	17
Finnish Albums (Suomen virallinen lista)	16
French Albums (SNEP)	41
German Albums (Offizielle Top 100)	11
Irish Albums (IRMA)	27
Italian Albums (FIMI)	11
New Zealand Albums (RMNZ)	1
Norwegian Albums (VG-lista)	7
Portuguese Albums (AFP)	19
Scottish Albums (Official Charts)	33
Spanish Albums (PROMUSICAE)	74
Swedish Albums (Sverigetopplistan)	17
Swiss Albums (Schweizer Hitparade)	77
UK Albums (Official Charts)	37
US Billboard 200	2

=== Year-end charts ===
Chart (2003)	Position
US Billboard 200	141

== Certifications ==
Certifications for Thirteenth Step
Region	Certification	Certified units/sales
Australia (ARIA)	Gold	35,000^{^}
Canada (Music Canada)	Gold	50,000^{^}
New Zealand (RMNZ)	Gold	7,500^{^}
United Kingdom (BPI)	Silver	60,000^{‡}
United States (RIAA)	Platinum	1,000,000^{^}
^{^} Shipments figures based on certification alone.^{‡} Sales+streaming figures based on certification alone.
