= Emotive (album) =

Studio album by A Perfect Circle
- Released: November 2, 2004
- Recorded: June 28 − September 3, 2004
- Genres: Alternative rock; art rock
- Length: 48:13
- Label: Virgin
- Producers: Billy Howerdel, Maynard James Keenan (exec.)

A Perfect Circle chronology
| Thirteenth Step (2003) | Emotive (2004) | Amotion (2004) |

Singles from Emotive
- 1. "Imagine" Released: September 28, 2004; 2. "Passive" Released: January 18, 2005

Emotive (stylized as eMOTIVe) is the third studio album by American rock band A Perfect Circle. The album is primarily a collection of anti-war cover songs. It was released on November 2, 2004, via Virgin Records to coincide with the US presidential election. Two singles were released in support of the album; a cover of John Lennon's "Imagine", and "Passive", a previously unreleased song originating from the defunct Tapeworm project. The album debuted at number two on the US Billboard 200 chart, though the band would not tour in support of the album, later entering a hiatus. It would be the band's last studio release until 2018's Eat the Elephant.

== Background ==
After wrapping up the touring in support of Thirteenth Step in the first half of 2004, the band had announced it planned to enter a long hiatus so that band frontman Maynard James Keenan could return to his original band, Tool, while guitarist Billy Howerdel pursued a solo career. In July 2004, Keenan performed at Serj Tankian's (System of a Down) and Tom Morello's (Rage Against the Machine) Axis of Justice concert – an event for musicians to advocate for political and social causes. At the performance, Keenan announced that A Perfect Circle would be releasing a collection of political cover songs. During the beginning of the touring cycle for Thirteenth Step, Howerdel and Keenan discussed potential ideas for a third studio album. An early idea was to record an album of cover songs, though they were initially hesitant, feeling they needed a meaningful reason to warrant doing it. Keenan, who had been very critical of President George W. Bush during the touring cycle, proposed tying the concept together as a political-themed covers album, with Howerdel, while generally apolitical publicly, felt was worth pursuing in their post-September 11th attacks political and social climate. The two put their plans on hold temporarily and decided to move forward on the project as the band's third studio album.

Keenan emphasized that, despite his personal feelings on Bush, the album was less of an "anti-Bush" album, and more of an "anti-political apathy" – encouraging people to research things and become more involved.

== Writing and recording ==
The band rushed to complete the album in time to release it prior to the 2004 U.S. Presidential Elections in November, just barely a year after their prior release. Recording sessions ran from late June to early September. In addition to Howerdel, Keenan, and drummer Josh Freese, who appear on most tracks, the album features various contributions from former and then-current members of the band including Paz Lenchantin, Danny Lohner, Jeordie White, and James Iha. Keenan, aware of the time constraints and Howerdel's future intentions on doing solo albums, also encouraged Howerdel to contribute lead vocals to about a third of the album. A wide variety of different songs were chosen to be recorded, from Marvin Gaye's "What's Going On" to "When the Levee Breaks", a song written and first recorded by Kansas Joe McCoy and Memphis Minnie and later popularized by Led Zeppelin. Most songs were radical reinterpretations of the original, sometimes unrecognizable compared to the originals. Howerdel explained that it was done on purpose, to make the songs their own, and conceded that he, as of 2010, still had not even once ever heard the original version of Crucifix's "Annihilation", another song re-recorded for the album. He also stated that some songs had started as original A Perfect Circle songs musically, until the band decided to use the lyrics of other songs over the compositions, in turn converting them into cover songs. Keenan explained the album's concept:

"Look, clearly I'm supporting anyone but Bush in this upcoming election, but I'm not telling anyone who to vote for with this new album. I'm still just trying to encourage people to think for themselves…to stop buying into this absurdity and rampant fear. But even that message has been somehow edited over the last four fucking years and it pisses me off. How can simple message of 'get off your ass and educate yourself' be turned into a reason to dismiss our efforts? We're speaking our minds. We're following our hearts.

The album's final track list would contain ten covers and two original songs. The song "Passive", was one of just two original songs on the album, tracing back to writing sessions for Trent Reznor's unreleased Tapeworm project. In the late 1990s, Reznor started the project for songs that did not fit Nine Inch Nails, which eventually grew into a collaborative project with a number of other musicians. One track, "Vacant", featured contributions from Keenan and Lohner in 1999, but with the project hitting development hell due to creative and legal hurdles of many of the participants in the early 2000s, A Perfect Circle began playing the track at live shows. With the project being shelved completely by 2004, Keenan decided to rework the track as "Passive" for Emotive. The other original song was "Counting Bodies Like Sheep to the Rhythm of the War Drums", which was originally perceived to be a remix of the song "Pet", from Thirteenth Step. Keenan later clarified it as not a remix, but rather a second part of "Pet". The lyrical content of "Counting Bodies Like Sheep to the Rhythm of the War Drums" is similar to that in "Pet", but the delivery and staging of the vocals vary, reflecting the political tones of the album. The band also recorded a rendition of Elton John's "Border Song" during the Emotive sessions, but it was left off the album, with Keenan feeling they were unable to make their version of the song work right in the context of the album.

== Release, promotion, and aftermath ==
The band's third album, Emotive, was released on November 2, 2004 – the actual U.S. Presidential Election Day. Two singles were released in support of the album, the first of which was a somber cover of John Lennon's "Imagine" The second single, "Passive", was released as a second single in early 2005. "Counting Bodies Like Sheep" was also released as a promotional single, and had an accompanying animated music video. Additionally, two weeks after the release of Emotive, on November 16, 2004, the band released the CD/DVD compilation set entitled Amotion. The DVD part contained the music videos for the band's six singles; while the CD is composed entirely of remixes of the singles from Mer de Noms and Thirteenth Step.

The band did not tour in support of the release, instead deciding to enter the hiatus they had delayed to record the album in the first place. However, upon reforming in 2010, the band would play the album live, in its entirety, on multiple occasions, as part of the band's efforts to play each of their three albums live, front to back, for their 2011 live album release A Perfect Circle Live: Featuring Stone and Echo. These performances featured refined and extended iterations of many songs, often containing alternate vocal performances and extended guitar or piano parts for tracks, reworked to be optimally played in a live setting.

== Reception ==
Professional ratings
Aggregate scores
| Source | Rating |
|---|---|
| Metacritic | 62/100 |
Review scores
| Source | Rating |
| AllMusic | 2/5 stars |
| Blender | 3/5 stars |
| E! Online | B+ |
| The Guardian | 4/5 stars |
| Rolling Stone | 3/5 stars |

=== Critical reception ===
Upon its release, Emotive received generally positive reviews from music critics. At Metacritic, which assigns a normalized rating out of 100 to reviews from critics, the album received an average score of 62, which indicates "generally favorable reviews", based on 12 reviews. The reception was much more polarizing than with their prior two albums, with some critics and fans not appreciating the band's move into more political content, or the radical liberties they had taken with the album's cover versions. Others accused the band of rushing out a third album to fulfill the band's three album contractual obligation to Virgin Records, a claim refuted as false by Howerdel. The album still managed to receive a generally positive reception from critics. In a three out of five star review, Mojo dubbed it "one of the most bizarre covers albums ever".

Adam Sweeting of The Guardian gave the album a four-star review, stating: "Cover versions are often hobbled by the artist's inability to step outside the original and find a fresh perspective, but some of these treatments verge on the visionary." David Fricke of Rolling Stone labeled the album as "eccentric", while noting that the band "revisits classic protest hits, jacking up the terror by throwing out iconic arrangements and performing heretical surgery on the melodies."

Nevertheless, Rob Theakston of AllMusic was mixed in his review, stating that "Emotive falls flat and fails to raise the bar set so high by the quality of their previous two releases." He also criticized the style of the album and wrote: "A Perfect Circle work their way through 12 songs that would almost be unrecognizable in their current arrangement if one weren't familiar with the original versions of each song."

=== Commercial performance ===
The album's sales were similar to its reception – positive, but less so than prior albums. The position debuted at number 2 on the US Billboard 200 chart, selling 142,000 copies in its first week – matching Thirteenth Step's peak chart placement, but selling almost 90,000 copies less. It was certified Gold by the RIAA on December 9, 2004, indicating half of a million units sold.

== Track listing ==
| No. | Title | Writer(s) | Length |
|---|---|---|---|
| 1. | "Annihilation" (Crucifix cover) | Matthew Borruso; Christopher Douglas; Sothira Pheng | 2:13 |
| 2. | "Imagine" (John Lennon cover) | Lennon | 4:48 |
| 3. | "Peace, Love, and Understanding" (Brinsley Schwarz cover) | Nick Lowe | 5:03 |
| 4. | "What's Going On" (Marvin Gaye cover) | Gaye; Renaldo Benson; Al Cleveland | 4:53 |
| 5. | "Passive" | Danny Lohner; Maynard James Keenan; Trent Reznor; Billy Howerdel | 4:09 |
| 6. | "Gimmie Gimmie Gimmie" (Black Flag cover) | Greg Ginn | 2:18 |
| 7. | "People Are People" (Depeche Mode cover) | Martin Gore | 3:43 |
| 8. | "Freedom of Choice" (Devo cover) | Gerald Casale; Mark Mothersbaugh | 2:59 |
| 9. | "Let's Have a War" (Fear cover) | Philo Cramer; Lee Ving | 3:28 |
| 10. | "Counting Bodies Like Sheep to the Rhythm of the War Drums" | Howerdel; Keenan | 5:36 |
| 11. | "When the Levee Breaks" (Memphis Minnie & Kansas Joe McCoy cover) | arranged by Howerdel/Keenan | 5:55 |
| 12. | "Fiddle and the Drum" (Joni Mitchell cover) | Mitchell | 3:06 |
| Total length: | | | 48:13 |

== Personnel ==
A Perfect Circle

- Maynard James Keenan – lead vocals (1, 2, 4–6, 9–12), backing vocals (7, 8), piano (2), arranger, production (exec.), rearrangement (1, 2, 6, 9–12)
- Billy Howerdel – guitar (1–6, 8, 11), bass (2, 4, 8, 11), piano (1), harmonium (6), keyboards (1, 7), programming (1, 3, 7), backing vocals (2, 5, 10), lead vocals (3, 4, 7, 8), production, engineering, mixing (5, 7, 12), rearrangement (1, 3, 7, 8, 11)
- Danny Lohner – bass (5, 6, 9), guitar (5, 9), arranger; keyboards and programming (1), backing vocals (6, 7, 10), co-producer (2, 5, 6, 9, 10), engineer (10), mixing (10) rearrangement (4, 10), instrumentation (10)
- Josh Freese – drums (2–9, 11)
- Paz Lenchantin – piano (2, 5, 11), strings (2, 3)
- James Iha – guitar, keyboards and programming (7)
- Jeordie White – bass (7)

Additional musicians

- Charles Clouser – programming (3, 4)
- Josh Eustis – drums (10), engineering (10), Rhodes piano (10), mixing (10)
- Jason Freese – baritone and tenor saxophone (10)

Production

- Critter – additional engineering
- Steve Duda – digital engineering
- Steven R. Gilmore – design, photography, sleeve art, poster design
- John Giustina – photography
- David Mattix – assistant engineering
- Matt Mitchell – digital engineering
- Andy Wallace – mixing (1–6, 8, 9, 11)

== Charts ==
=== Album ===
| Chart (2004) | Peak position |
|---|---|
| Australian Albums (ARIA) | 8 |
| Austrian Albums (Ö3 Austria) | 61 |
| Belgian Albums (Ultratop Flanders) | 97 |
| Canadian Albums (Billboard) | 5 |
| Dutch Albums (Album Top 100) | 46 |
| French Albums (SNEP) | 61 |
| German Albums (Offizielle Top 100) | 33 |
| Italian Albums (FIMI) | 31 |
| New Zealand Albums (RMNZ) | 2 |
| Norwegian Albums (VG-lista) | 18 |
| Scottish Albums (Official Charts) | 68 |
| Swiss Albums (Schweizer Hitparade) | 62 |
| UK Albums (Official Charts) | 80 |
| US Billboard 200 | 2 |

=== Singles ===
| Year | Single | Chart | Position |
|---|---|---|---|
| 2004 | "Imagine" | Mainstream Rock Tracks | 26 |
| 2004 | "Imagine" | Modern Rock Tracks | 26 |
| 2004 | "Passive" | Mainstream Rock Tracks | 14 |
| 2004 | "Passive" | Modern Rock Tracks | 14 |

== Certifications ==
| Region | Certification | Certified units/sales |
|---|---|---|
| Canada (Music Canada) | Gold | 50,000^{^} |
| United States (RIAA) | Gold | 500,000^{^} |
^{^} Shipments figures based on certification alone.
