= Paz Lenchantin =

Argentine-American musician (born 1973)

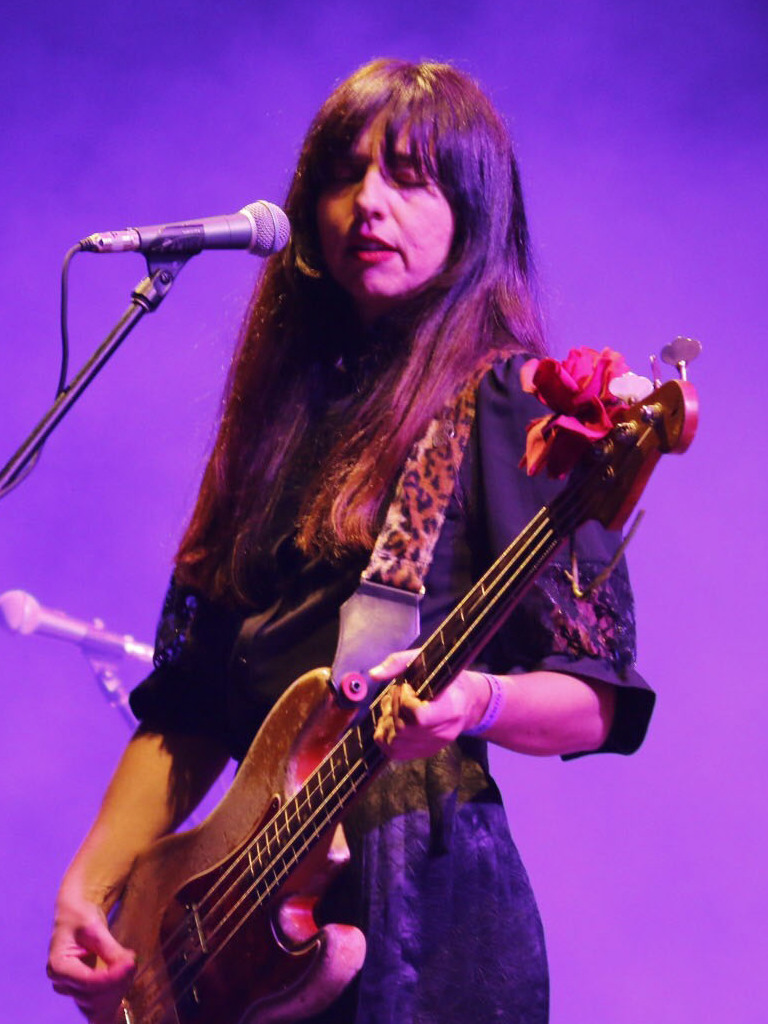
- Lenchantin performing with the Pixies in 2018

Background information
- Born: December 12, 1973 (age 52); Mar del Plata, Buenos Aires Province, Argentina
- Genres: Alternative rock; indie rock; progressive rock
- Occupation: Musician
- Instruments: Bass; vocals; violin; piano
- Years active: 2000–present
- Formerly of: Pixies; A Perfect Circle; the Chelsea; Brightblack Morning Light; Entrance; Zwan; the Entrance Band

Paz Lenchantin (born December 12, 1973) is an Argentine-American musician. She is best known for having been the bass guitarist and backing vocalist of the alternative rock band Pixies, playing with the band and recording three studio albums between 2014 and 2024. Prior to joining Pixies, Lenchantin was a member of Entrance, A Perfect Circle, Silver Jews and Zwan.

In April 2024, Consequence named Lenchantin the 75th greatest bass guitarist of all time, noting: "Not only did she fit in beautifully in [A Perfect Circle and Pixies], but she was also a shining light in Billy Corgan's short-lived band Zwan. In addition to her bass playing, she's also an accomplished vocalist and a skilled violinist."

== Early life ==
Lenchantin moved to Los Angeles from Argentina, Mar Del Plata in 1979. She began playing piano at age five. She then took violin lessons at age 8 and taught herself how to play guitar at age 12. She also frequently collaborated with her brother Luciano Lenchantin before his death in 2003. In the 1990s, Paz was a piano teacher, a music programmer for video games, and a sound composer for the Sci-Fi Channel.

== Career ==
Lenchantin joined Billy Howerdel, Josh Freese, Troy Van Leeuwen, and Maynard James Keenan in the band A Perfect Circle. She contributed to their albums Mer de Noms (2000) and Thirteenth Step (2003). Lenchantin later left the group to join Billy Corgan, Jimmy Chamberlin, Matt Sweeney, and David Pajo in the band Zwan.

In 2002, Lenchantin, Melissa Auf der Maur (Smashing Pumpkins and Hole), Samantha Maloney, and Radio Sloan (the Need) created a new band, the Chelsea. The all-female supergroup played only one show on February 2, 2002, before going their separate ways. An audience recording of said show was later bootlegged. Lenchantin returned to play strings and piano with A Perfect Circle in recording their cover album Emotive, released November 2, 2004, and debuting at number 2 on the Billboard 200. She also contributed a solo cover of the song "The Hollow" to A Perfect Circle's CD/DVD release aMOTION. Lenchantin was a member the Entrance Band, contributing bass, violin and vocals on their albums Prayer of Death (2006) and The Entrance Band (2009), which she co-produced. She also appeared on the previous Entrance album Wandering Stranger Produced by Chris Coady (2004).

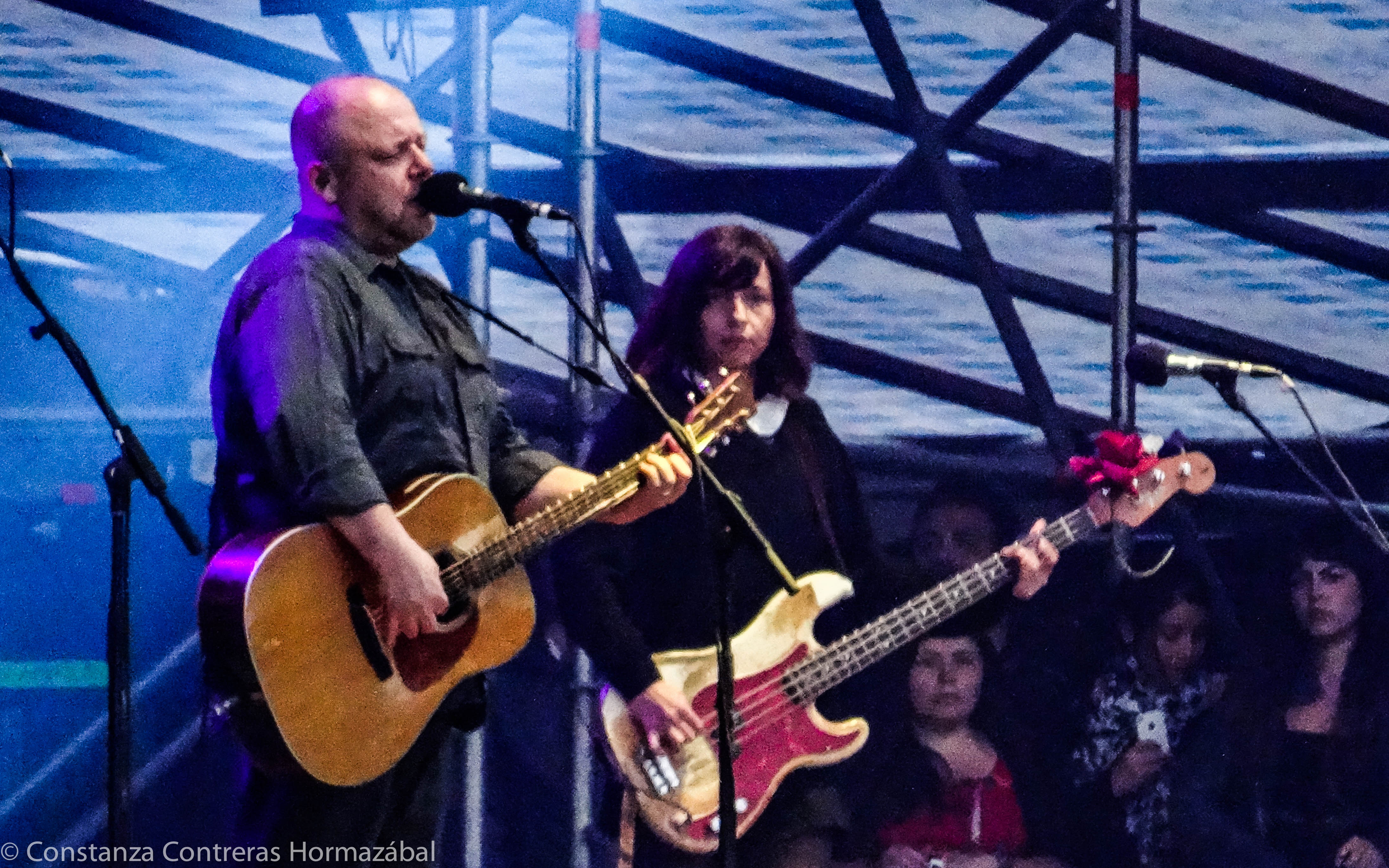
Lenchantin and Black Francis performing with Pixies in 2013

Since 2012, Lechantin has been touring with Josephine Foster supporting the Blood Rushing album promotion. In December 2013, Lenchantin was announced as the new touring bassist for Pixies, in replacement of founding band member Kim Deal and touring bassist Kim Shattuck, for their 2014 tour. In July 2016, Lenchantin confirmed that she was a full-time member of Pixies.

On 4 March 2024, the Pixies announced that Lenchantin had left "to concentrate on her own projects". In a statement to Rolling Stone, Lenchantin said that the choice was not hers and that her "departure [was] a bit of a surprise to [her] as it is to many".

Following her departure from Pixies, Lenchantin spent much of 2024 in Petatlán, Mexico, where she wrote the material that became her solo album Triste. She announced the album in August 2025 alongside its lead single, "Hang Tough", backed with "Salvate!", and directed the single's video. Lenchantin performed the majority of the instrumentation herself before adding contributions from her former A Perfect Circle bandmates Josh Freese and Troy Van Leeuwen, along with the musician Jeffertiti, on "Hang Tough". The twelve-track album was mixed by Chris Coady and released on 17 October 2025 through Lenchantin's own label, Hideous Human Records.

=== Other appearances ===
Lenchantin played strings on the Queens of the Stone Age album Songs for the Deaf. She has played with David Pajo in Papa M, and contributed fiddle on the Silver Jews record Tanglewood Numbers. She has toured with RTX/Jennifer Herrema of Royal Trux. In 2002, she performed on Trust Company's album The Lonely Position of Neutral. In 2005 she played violin on the Kaura track "Dividing Lines". She has also contributed to and toured with Jarboe of Swans. In 2000, she appeared in A Perfect Circle's "Judith" music video as bassist. Lenchantin also played bass on Brightblack Morning Light's 2006 self-titled album on Matador Records. She worked with director Michael Mann on his film Miami Vice contributing violin on several scenes. She contributed playing strings on Melissa Auf der Maur's first solo album Auf der Maur. In 2008, Paz co-wrote the Ashes Divide song "Denial Waits", and she played violin on Jenny Lewis' second studio album Acid Tongue. She appeared on Into the Presence's 2009 album, playing the bass.

== Discography ==
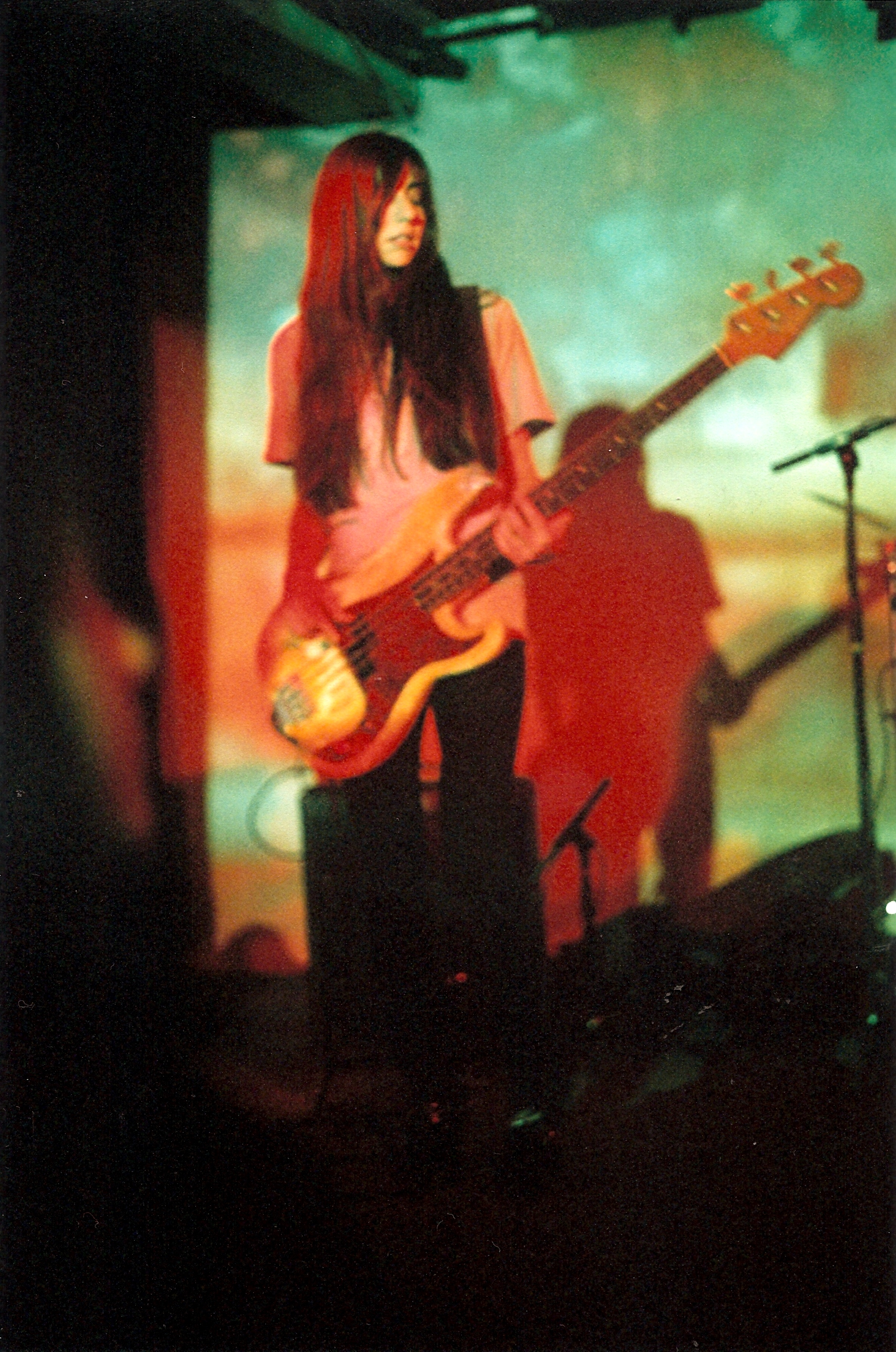
Lenchantin in 2010

Solo

- Yellow My Skycaptain (2001)
- Songs for Luci (2006)
- Triste (2025)

With A Perfect Circle

- Mer de Noms (2000) (Strings, bass on "Sleeping Beauty", backing vocals on "Judith")
- Thirteenth Step (2003) (Strings on "Gravity")
- Emotive (2004) (Piano, strings)
- Amotion (2004) (Acoustic guitar, piano, strings)

With Pixies

- Indie Cindy (2014) (Bass on all Deluxe edition live tracks, vocals and bass on vinyl exclusive track "Women of War")
- Head Carrier (2016) (Bass, backing vocals, lead vocals on "All I Think About Now")
- Beneath the Eyrie (2019) (Bass, backing vocals, lead vocals on "Los Surfers Muertos")
- Doggerel (2022) (Bass, backing vocals, keyboards)

With Zwan

- Mary Star of the Sea (2003) (Bass, backing vocals)

With Ashes Divide

- Keep Telling Myself It's Alright (2008) (Co-writing on "Denial Waits")

With Brightblack Morning Light

- Brightblack Morning Light (2006) (Bass, piano)

With Entrance

- Wandering Stranger (2004)
- Prayer of Death (2006) (Bass; co-producer; violin; vocals)
- The Entrance Band (2009) (Bass)
- Fine Flow (2012) (Bass)

With Jenny Lewis

- Acid Tongue (2008) (Violin on "Black Sand")

With Josephine Foster

- Blood Rushing (2012) (Indian flute, bass, violin, vocals)

With Kaura

- Kaura EP (2005) (Violin on "Dividing Lines")

With Melissa Auf der Maur

- Auf der Maur (2004) (Strings)

With Queen Adreena

- Pretty Like Drugs (2002) (Violin on "Beneath the Skin")

With Queens of the Stone Age

- Songs for the Deaf (2002) (Strings on "Mosquito Song")

With Silver Jews

- Tanglewood Numbers (2005) (Fiddle)

With Trust Company

- The Lonely Position of Neutral (2002) (Strings, piano on "Hover (Alternate Version)")

With Jarboe

- The Men Album (2005) (Bass on "Feral" and vocals / strings on "A Woman's Dreams")
