= Mer de Noms =

Studio album by A Perfect Circle
- Released: May 23, 2000
- Studios: The Chop Shop (Hollywood); Sound City (Van Nuys); Extasy (North Hollywood)
- Genres: Alternative metal; alternative rock; hard rock; progressive rock; art rock
- Length: 44:25
- Label: Virgin
- Producer: Billy Howerdel

A Perfect Circle chronology
Mer de Noms (2000)	Thirteenth Step (2003)

Singles from Mer de Noms
- 1. "Judith" Released: July 8, 2000; 2. "3 Libras" Released: February 13, 2001; 3. "The Hollow" Released: June 17, 2001

Mer de Noms (French for "Sea of Names") is the debut studio album by American rock supergroup A Perfect Circle. The album was released on May 23, 2000, and entered the Billboard 200 at No. 4, making it the highest ever Billboard 200 debut for a rock band's first album. It sold over 188,000 copies in the first week, and was certified platinum by the RIAA later that same year. Three singles were released in promotion of the album, "Judith", "3 Libras", and "The Hollow", all of which hit the top 20 of both the Billboard US Modern Rock Tracks and Mainstream Rock charts.

== Background ==
The band was originally conceived by Billy Howerdel, a former guitar technician for Nine Inch Nails, the Smashing Pumpkins, Fishbone and Tool. Howerdel met singer Maynard James Keenan in 1992, when Tool was opening for Fishbone, and the two became friends. Three years later, Keenan offered Howerdel, who was looking for lodging, a room in his North Hollywood home. This provided Howerdel the opportunity to play demos of his music for Keenan. Pleased with what he heard, Keenan remarked, "I can hear myself singing [those songs]." Although he originally desired a female vocalist, Howerdel agreed that Keenan would be a good fit, and A Perfect Circle was formed a short time later. The two rounded out the band's initial lineup with bassist and violinist Paz Lenchantin, former Failure guitarist Troy Van Leeuwen, and Primus drummer Tim Alexander. The band played their first show at LA's Viper Club Reception in August 1999, followed by a larger-scale, more widely publicized show at the Coachella Festival the following October. While initially in talks to sign with Volcano Records - Tool's record label - Keenan stated that they instead chose to go with Virgin Records, who Keenan felt better understood that Keenan meant for the band to be an equally important band to Tool, not a minor side project. After the initial shows and securing a record deal, the band entered the studio to begin work on their first album. Alexander was soon replaced with Josh Freese, who previously worked with Howerdel on the Guns N' Roses album Chinese Democracy, with Alexander's only studio contribution being drums on the album version of the song "The Hollow".

== Composition and themes ==
Musically, the album features a sound that "returns the listeners to the daze of prog rock" and "blurs between alternative rock and hard rock, with many slower tunes exhibiting an intense smolder rather than flash burn." The New Yorker magazine also noted that the band experiments with "the seam between heavy metal and alternative rock" on the record. Various instruments featured on the album include acoustic guitars, violins and xylophones.

Most of the album's lyrics were dedicated to various people that lead singer Maynard James Keenan knew. The track listing consists of various names such as "Judith", "Breña", "Rose", "Thomas", "Magdalena", "Orestes", and "Renholdër" (for musician Danny Lohner).

The symbols on the front cover of the album can be translated to "La Cascade des Prénoms", which translated to English means "the waterfall of first names".

Howerdel had been working on some of the music, including tracks "The Hollow" and "Breña", as far back as 1988. The song "Renholdër" is a reference to guitarist and sound engineer Danny Lohner and reads "Re:D.Lohner" backwards. Lohner did not know the song was about him despite his first name being sung—albeit in a distorted fashion—in the song.

== Release and promotion ==
A month prior to release, the band embarked on a tour with Nine Inch Nails, which ran from April until June. The album was released on May 23, 2000, and entered the Billboard 200 at No. 4, making it the highest ever Billboard 200 debut for a rock band's first album at the time. It sold over 188,000 copies in the first week, and stayed on the charts for 51 consecutive weeks. It was certified platinum by the RIAA on October 31, 2000. The album peaked at No. 27 on the Billboard Top Pop Catalog Albums on October 4, 2003, three years after the album's release.

After the album's release and the Nine Inch Nails tour, the band embarked on a Canadian tour, the Summersault Tour, with the Foo Fighters, Smashing Pumpkins, and Our Lady Peace, in early August, followed by a North American headlining tour throughout the rest of the month and September. From January 31 to March 31, 2001, A Perfect Circle toured across the United States with Snake River Conspiracy as support. The band planned on touring with Queens of the Stone Age, but those plans fell through, and they chose the band after taking a liking to their music.

== Critical reception ==
Professional ratings
Review scores
Source	Rating
AllMusic	4/5 stars
Entertainment Weekly	A−
Kerrang!	4/5 stars
Melody Maker	4/5 stars
Metal Hammer	8/10
NME	7/10
Q	4/5 stars
Rock Hard	8.5/10
Rolling Stone	2.5/5 stars
Sputnikmusic	4/5 stars

AllMusic critic Ned Raggett praised the album's instrumentation and composition, praising "the addicting combination of Keenan's aching voice and Howerdel's accomplished songs and production skills made for one of 2000's best splashes in whatever was left of 'modern rock'." Entertainment Weekly critic Marc Weingarten praised the album for maintaining the artistic influence of Maynard's work with Tool without sounding quite as ominous, and that it melded well with Howerdel's "leavening guitar shrapnel with genuinely pretty melodies and frilly production flourishes". Melody Maker commented: "This is Killing Joke and Jane's Addiction; this is Soundgarden and Alice In Chains; Keenan's gorgeously intimate voice is shoved up front throughout and it's his throat's suckable folds that draw you deeper in." NME wrote: "In exploring their corrupt visions, A Perfect Circle have created a work of morbid beauty. In terms of darkness, it eclipses nearly everything else." Rolling Stone's Pat Blashill stated: "A Perfect Circle sound like a desperate dream of what rock used to be." Tyler Fisher of Sputnikmusic was positive in his assessment of the album, writing: "Among these brilliant songs, the album has much more to offer, most songs being extremely melodic and beautiful, a sound A Perfect Circle embraces on Thirteenth Step and takes to another level." Stuart Green of Exclaim! described the album as "a fairly straight ahead rock record, at least by Tool standards," further adding: "And with the addition of violin, courtesy of bassist Paz Lenchantin, flute and other prog-rock trappings, the record takes on a much more dynamic edge while retaining its ball-breaking heaviness."

In 2005, Mer de Noms was ranked No. 443 in Rock Hard magazine's book of The 500 Greatest Rock & Metal Albums of All Time. The album was also included as No. 15 in Loudwire's "Best Debut Hard Rock Albums." In 2016, Metal Hammer included it on their "10 essential alt-metal albums" list; four years later, they also cited it as one of the 20 best metal albums of 2000.

== Track listing ==
All tracks are written by Billy Howerdel and Maynard James Keenan.

CD
No.	Title	Length
1.	"The Hollow"	2:58
2.	"Magdalena"	4:05
3.	"Rose"	3:26
4.	"Judith"	4:07
5.	"Orestes"	4:48
6.	"3 Libras"	3:39
7.	"Sleeping Beauty"	4:10
8.	"Thomas"	3:29
9.	"Renholdër"	2:23
10.	"Thinking of You"	4:32
11.	"Breña"	4:24
12.	"Over"	2:21
Total length:		44:25

Japanese edition bonus track
No.	Title	Length
13.	"Orestes" (Demo)	3:24
Total length:		47:49

Note

- The vinyl version contains "Sleeping Beauty" with extended intro (4:57) and alternate mix of "Over" (3:07).

== Personnel ==
Credits adapted from Mer de Noms liner notes

Band

- Maynard James Keenan – vocals (tracks 1–12), gord (kalimba) (track 12)
- Billy Howerdel – guitar (tracks 1–11), bass (tracks 1–6, 8, 10, and 11) background vocals (tracks 1, 4, 5, and 9–11), keyboards (track 5), piano (tracks 9 and 12)
- Josh Freese – drums (tracks 2–11), percussion (track 9)
- Paz Lenchantin – violin (tracks 3, 6, and 9), bass (track 7), backing vocals (tracks 4, 5, and 9)
- Troy Van Leeuwen – lead guitar parts at end of song (tracks 7 and 10)

Additional musicians

- Tim Alexander – drums (track 1)
- Luciano Lenchantin – viola (track 6)
- Draven Godwin – percussion (track 8)
- Kelli Shafer – backing vocals (track 9)

Production

- Billy Howerdel – production, mixing, sound engineering
- Alan Moulder – mixing
- Frank Gryner – drum engineering
- Eddy Schreyer – mastering

== Charts ==
=== Weekly charts ===
Weekly chart performance for Mer de Noms
Chart (2000)	Peak position
Australian Albums (ARIA)	2
Canadian Albums (Billboard)	5
Dutch Albums (Album Top 100)	81
German Albums (Offizielle Top 100)	55
New Zealand Albums (RMNZ)	2
Norwegian Albums (VG-lista)	32
Scottish Albums (Official Charts)	58
Swedish Albums (Sverigetopplistan)	54
UK Albums (Official Charts)	55
US Billboard 200	4

=== Year-end charts ===
Year-end chart performance for Mer de Noms
Chart (2000)	Position
Australian Albums (ARIA)	92
Canadian Albums (Nielsen SoundScan)	89
US Billboard 200	90

== Certifications ==
Certifications for Mer de Noms
Region	Certification	Certified units/sales
Australia (ARIA)	Gold	35,000^{^}
Canada (Music Canada)	Platinum	100,000^{^}
United Kingdom (BPI)	Silver	60,000^{^}
United States (RIAA)	Platinum	1,000,000^{^}
^{^} Shipments figures based on certification alone.
