= Billy Howerdel =

American guitarist (born 1970)

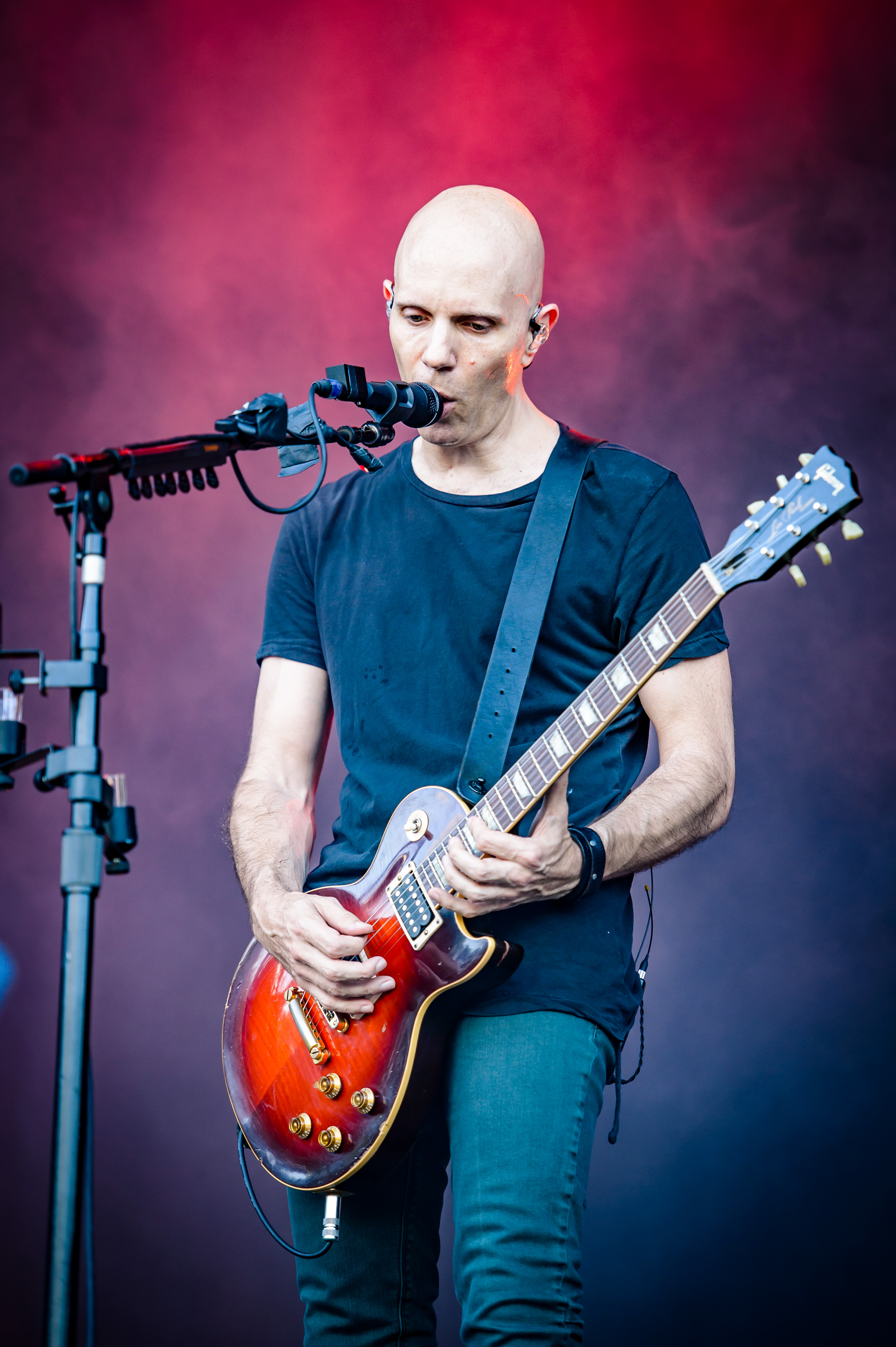
- Howerdel in 2018

Background information
- Born: William L. Howerdel; May 18, 1970 (age 56)
- Origin: New Jersey, United States
- Genres: Hard rock; alternative rock; alternative metal; experimental rock; industrial
- Occupations: Musician, record producer
- Instruments: Guitar; vocals; keyboards
- Years active: 1988–present
- Member of: A Perfect Circle
- Website: billyhowerdel.com

William L. Howerdel (born May 18, 1970) is an American musician, best known as a founding member, guitarist, backing vocalist, songwriter, and producer for the band A Perfect Circle. He has recorded six studio albums across his career: four with A Perfect Circle, one under the moniker Ashes Divide, and one under his own name.

== Early life ==
Howerdel was born in New Jersey. He attended high school at West Milford High School, where he played sports, took an interest in a television production class, and was active in an extracurricular audio program. This program gave him the foundation for his post-high school audio-technical pursuits and eventually led to his high-profile guitar technician positions. Stephen Porcello, the high school teacher who was the adviser for this program, took Howerdel to New York City and helped him select his first electric guitar.

Howerdel spent several years sound engineering for New Jersey artists and further worked as a guitar technician for numerous others before forming A Perfect Circle, including Faith No More, Fishbone, David Bowie, the Smashing Pumpkins, Nine Inch Nails, Guns N' Roses, and Tool.

== Recording career ==
=== Early work and A Perfect Circle ===
Howerdel functioned as a guitar technician for Tool during the tour and recording of Ænima, working with Maynard James Keenan, whom he met in 1992. During this time, Howerdel played Keenan some of his songs, and Keenan offered to sing if Howerdel ever decided to form a band. Despite originally considering a female vocalist, Howerdel would eventually accept Keenan's offer. In 1999, Howerdel founded A Perfect Circle and invited Keenan to join. The project was a success. Their debut album, Mer de Noms, released in May 2000, went platinum in the US, selling over one million copies by the end of the year. However, complications arose: Keenan could not commit all of his time to the band, still fronting Tool, and over time, he began to be more and more involved in the creative process of the music, leading to disagreements on the musical direction for the second A Perfect Circle album, Thirteenth Step. The record, released in September 2003, was still a success, going platinum as well, though the two decided to take a break from the band, so that Keenan could return to Tool, and Howerdel could pursue solo work.

=== Ashes Divide ===
Ashes Divide
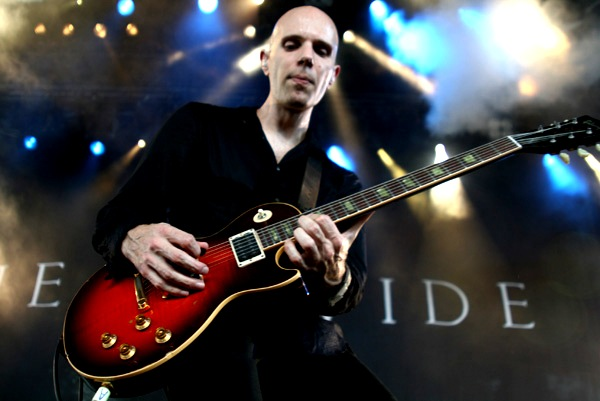
- Howerdel performing as Ashes Divide in 2008

Background information
- Origin: United States
- Genres: Alternative rock; hard rock; progressive rock
- Years active: 2005–present
- Label: Island
- Members: Billy Howerdel
- Website: ashesdivide.com

Howerdel first began working on solo material during the writing sessions for Thirteenth Step, in 2003. Rough versions of three or four songs were written during that era, including the track "Stripped Away", which was even played at soundchecks at A Perfect Circle (APC) concerts while supporting the album. Additionally, the APC demo "Army" was eventually reworked into Howerdel's own "The Stone". Shortly after Thirteenth Step, APC decided to quickly throw together a collection of anti-war cover songs just prior to the 2004 United States presidential election, entitled Emotive. Keenan pushed Howerdel to sing lead vocals on a few of the songs, to "get people used to [his] voice", and to help Howerdel transition to the role of primary singer in his solo work. Once Emotive was completed, APC went on hiatus, while Howerdel continued to write new material.

==== Keep Telling Myself It's Alright ====
As he put together more songs, Howerdel named his project Ashes Divide (stylised as ASHES dIVIDE) and began recording an album. He handled nearly all instruments in the studio, except drums, for which he recruited then-A Perfect Circle bandmate Josh Freese as a session musician. The project's first single, "The Stone", made its radio premiere on January 22, 2008, and the full album, titled Keep Telling Myself It's Alright, followed on April 8. The record features a guest cello performance on the track "Sword" by Devo Keenan, Maynard's son. In addition to Freese and Keenan, the record also includes contributions from drummer Dean Sainz, Concrete Blonde's Johnette Napolitano, Alkaline Trio's Matt Skiba, and former APC bassist Paz Lenchantin.

Howerdel formed a band to promote the record, touring throughout 2008. The lineup consisted of Jeff Friedl on drums, Matt McJunkins on bass, Jonathan Radtke on lead guitar, and Adam Monroe on keys.

The album debuted at number 36 in the U.S., selling 15,800 copies in its first week. As of August 2010, Keep Telling Myself It's Alright had sold 61,000 copies, according to Nielsen SoundScan.

==== Further activity and decline ====
Ashes Divide toured extensively in 2008 but pulled out of an opening slot for Puddle of Mudd at the end of the year, for undisclosed reasons, and fell out of the public eye. Toward the end of 2008, Maynard James Keenan announced that he and Howerdel were working on music for APC, and rumors arose that Ashes Divide was splitting up.

In late summer of 2009, Twitter posts and Myspace blogs indicated that the band was still active, and the group subsequently played a few live shows. Notably, they debuted a new song that Howerdel originally called "Untitled" but which has since been dubbed "Trafficking" by fans who attended Ashes Divide shows in late 2009 and early 2010. In April 2011, Howerdel mentioned that Ashes Divide would have released music in late 2010, had APC not reconvened for touring.

In December 2012, Howerdel updated the status of the project's second album, stating, "right now, I'm focusing most of my energy on a new Ashes Divide record, which is under way with 11 songs. Still working on finishing vocals and writing lyrics, and hopefully [will] get that thing mixed in January or February." Progress on the album was delayed, however, when Howerdel decided to redesignate a number of songs to APC instead.

The band played their first live show in three years on May 8, 2013, at the Satellite in Los Angeles, for Pathology Brand's "Wednesday Society" fundraising event. In April 2017, Howerdel commented that he still continued to work on new material, but that the sound had deviated so far from the project's first record, that he was contemplating whether or not he'd release it under the Ashes Divide name." In April 2018, he reiterated his plans to release a second album, but that some songs he had been working on ended up on the fourth APC album, Eat the Elephant, instead, including "So Long, and Thanks for All the Fish".

Revolver listed new Ashes Divide material as one of their most anticipated albums of 2020, despite it not having an official release date, and then again in 2021.

=== What Normal Was: 2022 ===
In early 2022, Howerdel announced the name of his second studio album, What Normal Was, to be released on June 10, 2022, under his own name rather than the Ashes Divide moniker. Former A Perfect Circle contributors Danny Lohner and Josh Freese, in addition to current bassist Matt McJunkins, played on the album. Lohner and Freese would go on to play live dates in support of the album with Howerdel.

=== Other projects ===
Howerdel has occasionally played live with the band Abandoned Pools. In 2005, he wrote and recorded music for the video game Jak X: Combat Racing, which also features remixes of Howerdel's songs by Danny Lohner and Dean Menta, as well as including contributions from Josh Freese, Troy Van Leeuwen, Atom Willard, Joey Castillo, ex-A Perfect Circle bassist Paz Lenchantin, and Wes Borland. Howerdel also worked on the Guns N' Roses album Chinese Democracy, specifically the song "There Was a Time".

== Personal life ==
In a 2008 interview, Howerdel said he did not take drugs, drank only occasionally, and practiced Transcendental Meditation.

== Discography ==
=== with A Perfect Circle ===
- Mer de Noms (2000)
- Thirteenth Step (2003)
- Emotive (2004)
- Eat the Elephant (2018)

=== as Ashes Divide ===
Albums

- Keep Telling Myself It's Alright (2008)

Singles

Year	Title	US Main.	US Mod.	Album
2008	"The Stone"	7	10	Keep Telling Myself It's Alright
2008	"The Prey"	—	—	Keep Telling Myself It's Alright
2008	"Enemies"	—	—	Keep Telling Myself It's Alright
"—" denotes a release that did not chart.

=== as Billy Howerdel ===
- What Normal Was (2022)

Soundtrack

- Jak X: Combat Racing (Official Soundtrack) (2005)
