= Still Sucks =

Studio album by Limp Bizkit
- Released: October 31, 2021
- Recorded: 2012–2021
- Genres: Nu metal; rap rock; alternative metalrap, pop
- Length: 31:55
- Label: Suretone
- Producers: Fred Durst; Zakk Cervini

Limp Bizkit chronology
Icon (2011)	Still Sucks (2021)

Limp Bizkit studio album chronology
Gold Cobra (2011)	Still Sucks (2021)

Singles from Still Sucks
- 1. "Dad Vibes" Released: September 30, 2021; 2. "Turn It Up, Bitch" Released: October 31, 2021

Still Sucks (stylized in ALL CAPS) is the sixth studio album by American nu metal band Limp Bizkit. It was released on October 31, 2021, through Suretone Records. Work on the album began in 2012 but was marred by numerous delays for the next nine years. The album's lead single "Dad Vibes" was premiered at the end of a performance at Lollapalooza on August 2, 2021, and officially released on September 30, 2021, marking their first brand-new material to be released in seven years. This is the band's final album to feature longtime bassist Sam Rivers, before his death in October 2025, and also being the final album to feature the classic line-up.

== Background ==
After the release of Gold Cobra in 2011 and subsequent touring, Limp Bizkit left their longtime label Interscope Records in December of the same year owing to creative differences and poor sales of the album. On February 24, 2012, Limp Bizkit signed with Cash Money Records, and revealed plans to release a new single, "Ready to Go", a full-length album and a sequel to their 2005 EP, The Unquestionable Truth (Part 1). Cash Money co-founder Birdman said, "If we find some great talent, we're gonna embrace it. Limp Bizkit, to me, is just a perfect match for us… It was something that Fred Durst was interested in doing, and I was already a fan, and I was like, 'Let's do it.' It's good for the brand, it will bring a different look for us, and we're definitely trying to expand on that side of music."

"As both an artist and someone who has signed artists, I can say without a doubt that Cash Money is at the top of their game. What attracted me to the label is not only their great taste and hustle, but their belief in their artists and the family atmosphere. [They] allow their artists to be themselves and encourage creative output and continued development."

— Vocalist Fred Durst, on why Limp Bizkit signed with Cash Money Records

However, a dispute between frontman Durst and fellow members DJ Lethal and John Otto over the latter two's "partying habits" and alleged drug abuse led to DJ Lethal being fired from the band in March 2012.

Guitarist Wes Borland released a second studio album with his side project Black Light Burns in mid-2012 and toured in support of the album throughout the year. It was only in December that the band's first offering for Cash Money was seen. A song called "Lightz (City of Angels)" was prematurely leaked via YouTube. In October 2012, DJ Lethal posted an apology using his Twitter account and was accepted back by the band, but he was dismissed again and left out of their upcoming 2013 tour of the US, replaced by touring turntablist DJ Skeletor.

In December 2015, Durst was rumored to possibly be holding back the release because he was not happy with the recordings. In February 2016, Metal Injection reported that the band was still in the studio recording the new album. Lethal returned to the band in 2018.

Borland provided an album update in June 2021, detailing the struggles with the album:

We've probably, in the last 10 years, been in the studio to try and complete the record, I wanna say, seven times, to different studios. And we've been working on stuff, working on stuff, working on stuff. And Fred [Durst] has been consistently kind of unsatisfied with where the vision is, I guess...We probably have 35 songs recorded instrumentally, and he's done vocals on them and then thrown the vocals away — done vocals and then [gone], 'Fuck this,' [and] thrown it away. So I think he's finally at the point now where he's gonna pick a set of these songs that he's finally cool with and finish 'em and we're gonna finish the record. So, fingers crossed."

At Lollapalooza in Chicago, Illinois in July 2021, the band ended their set with a song called "Dad Vibes", which Durst said is from the upcoming record. As well as this, a hip-hop track called "Turn It Up, Bitch" according to DJ Lethal, has been used as the outro for shows in Chicago and Wallingford, with it being announced at the latter to be the fourth track from the new album.

== Recording and composition ==
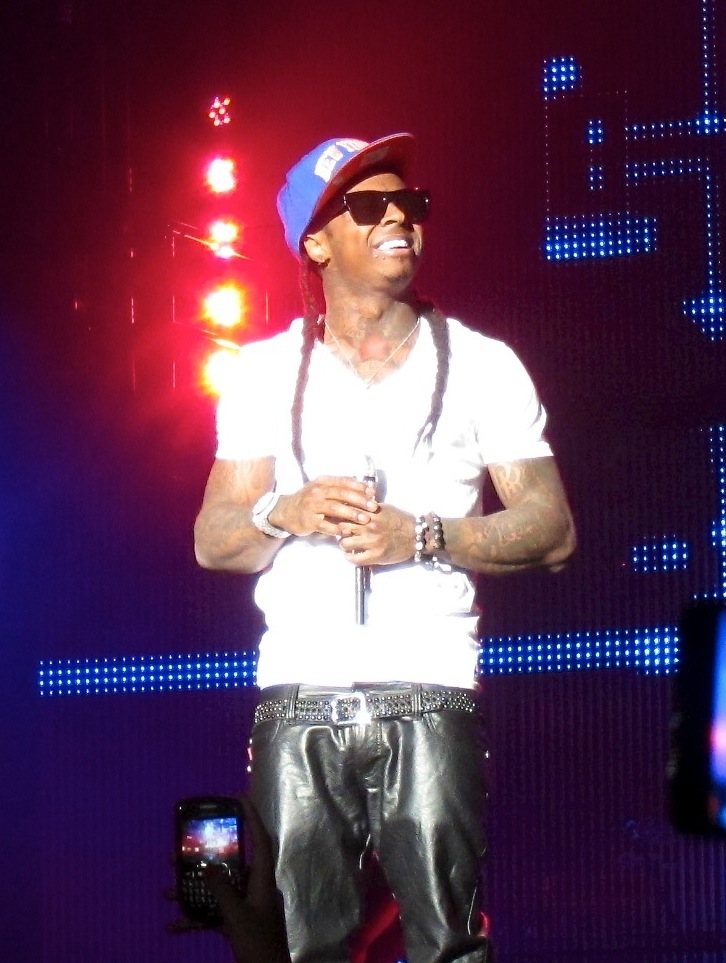
Rapper and former labelmate Lil Wayne performed the guest vocals on "Ready to Go".

The band started working on the album in 2012, when they signed with Cash Money. The single, "Ready to Go" was produced by hip hop producer Polow da Don. Durst had then told Billboard that he was putting the finishing touches on the track in March 2013.

In their positive review of the single, Artistdirect wrote, "'Ready to Go' feels like a band reawakened in many ways. At the same time, it's the Bizkit the world knows and loves from Significant Other and Chocolate Starfish and the Hot Dog Flavored Water".

In May 2013, amidst their tour of the United States, Borland told Billboard, "We're really trying to get it hammered out here. We're done with most of the music, pretty much all the music. I've mixed two songs and have a lot more mixing to do. The lyrics and vocals are probably 30 percent done, and Fred is working as we speak, on tour." Describing the album's sound, he said, "[It's] a little more pressure-free and a little more fun. I think it's a little bit more sort of playful, taking chances, a little less pop structured type of stuff. I don't want to say it (sounds) younger, but maybe a little more carefree, musically, to where we don't over-think what we're doing. We're leaving mistakes in and going, 'Oh, that sounds great, leave that in.' That's sort of the thinking instead of polishing too much or trying to stay within the parameters of a formula." He also said that producer Ross Robinson (who previously produced the band's debut album and The Unquestionable Truth (Part 1) has worked on "a little bit" of the album, along with the label's producer Detail, although it was primarily "a do-it-yourself affair." He further explained the album title, saying, "[It's] just from being stupid. I think we saw a disco ball elephant in the window of a shop somewhere. We were like, 'Look, it's a disco elephant. We should call our record Stampede of the Disco Elephants.' It's just a 10-second conversation that snowballed."

In an October 2018 BBC interview with Bring Me the Horizon frontman Oliver Sykes, it was revealed that he and Jordan Fish (the band's keyboardist as well as producer alongside Sykes) originally went to Los Angeles to help write the album with the band the year prior, however work on it would later be abandoned and the duo decided to move their attention towards work for the band's 2019 album Amo. According to Sykes, Durst "didn't show up most of the time" and would later say that he felt Durst was not ready to record the album yet. One of the riffs written from those sessions is used for the Bring Me the Horizon song "Wonderful Life", which appears on the Amo album.

== Announcement and delays ==
The album was first announced in early 2012, with the intention of releasing it by the end of 2012. After several years of delays, during an interview/talk with the podcast Someone Who Isn't Me that took place in September 2016, guitarist Wes Borland said he was unsure of Durst's ideas for the album, though the original plan was to make music in the spirit of Beastie Boys' studio album Paul's Boutique. Borland elaborated that Durst had been working on vocals "on and off" for the album but had not been satisfied with the outcome. Whereas Borland would prefer to "do whatever and just put it out" to capture the moment, Durst's method is to "keep working on something till he’s happy with it, even if it takes years and years", and expressed uncertainty of when the album would be released, if ever.

Borland had already completed writing and performing guitars for the record, but stated in late 2017 that Durst was still working on his parts.

On July 21, 2017, Durst claimed on Instagram that the album had already been available online for a year and a half on Soulseek and that "it's [the fans'] job to find it", but Borland refuted this, saying he "doesn't know what [Durst] is talking about".

Borland said in October 2017 that he was unaware of the status of the album, simply that he had recorded "28 or 29 songs" that Durst was working on away from the other members, before Borland was to mix the final product. Borland again reiterated the band's progress in November 2018.

== Promotion ==
Borland stated in 2013 that the album would be completed by August, and the band was hoping for a September release date. However, in July 2013, Durst stated on a Reddit "Ask Me Anything" event that the record would be released in the first quarter of 2014.

The intended first official single for the album, "Ready to Go", featuring Lil Wayne was released in March 2013, on the band's official website as a free download and, on April 16, as a digital single on iTunes and Amazon and the music video, directed by Durst, was released on July 22. On August 20, 2013, Limp Bizkit posted on their Facebook page that a second single is to be expected soon. It was soon confirmed to be set for release on November 1, 2013. The second single turned out to be "Thieves"; a cover of the song by Ministry that they performed live at Woodstock in 1999 and throughout many of their live sets since 1997, but had not recorded a studio version of until 2013. A month later, on December 11, the previously leaked track, "Lightz" was officially released as a promotional single, along with an accompanying music video. The band labelled it as "gift" for their fans.

Via an official Facebook post on May 30, 2014, the next single, "Endless Slaughter" was confirmed. Referring to it as the first "experience" off their upcoming album, the track is set to be released on cassette only during concerts, with the band encouraging potential listeners to invest in a "boom box for your analogue listening pleasure". The single was then released as a free download on their website and given its own music video. Limp Bizkit would embark upon a European tour from June 24 to July 4, 2014, followed by two dates in the US and culminating on November 16 at the second annual Knotfest in Makuhari Messe, Tokyo, where Limp Bizkit would perform along with festival founders Slipknot, longtime friends Korn, and other heavy metal acts such as Lamb of God, Five Finger Death Punch, Trivium and In Flames.

On July 6, 2019, the band debuted the song "Out of Style" (then tentatively titled "Wasteoid") live in Paris, France. The band played a studio recording of a new song titled "Dad Vibes" at the end of their performance at Lollapalooza on August 2, 2021, with Durst stating that it was "off [their] new album", and they released it as a single on September 30, 2021, marking their first brand-new material to be released for seven years.

On October 19, 2021, Durst posted a poll to his Instagram story, asking his followers if he should release one new song at a time or just release the entire album (12 songs) at once. The result of the poll skewed heavily in favor of the latter choice. On October 24, Durst teased a partial view of a new album cover on his Instagram story and suggested that the album would be released on Halloween—October 31, 2021, which would ultimately come true.

Unlike previous albums, Still Sucks was initially released on digital platforms only (Spotify, Apple Music, etc.). 18 months later on May 19, 2023, a physical release was made available through Suretone Records' website.

On February 8, 2023, a video for "Out of Style" was released, which featured the band as deepfakes of world leaders Joe Biden, Vladimir Putin, Volodymyr Zelenskyy, Xi Jinping, and Kim Jong Un. On July 5, 2024, the band released an AI-generated music video for "Turn It Up, Bitch".

== Reception ==
=== Pre-release ===
The album received notoriety for its repeated delays, with Team Rock and The New Zealand Herald dubbing it the "Chinese Democracy of nu metal".

=== Critical response ===
Professional ratings
Aggregate scores
Source	Rating
Metacritic	73/100
Review scores
Source	Rating
AllMusic	3.5/5 stars
Distorted Sound	5/10
Kerrang!	4/5 stars
Metal Injection	7.5/10
NME	3/5 stars
The PRP	3/5 stars
Sputnikmusic	3.8/5
Wall of Sound	7.5/10

According to the review aggregator Metacritic, Still Sucks received "generally favorable reviews" based on a weighted average score of 73 out of 100 from 4 critic scores. The PRP considered the album to feature "an off the cuff atmosphere and a less is more approach that fits the group’s current status like a glove" and noted that Wes Borland's "eclectic riff wizardry remains as intriguing as ever." Nick Ruskell of Kerrang! commented "this knowingly middle-aged iteration of Limp Bizkit is far more likeable and less obnoxious than their younger self. But even so, they’ve lost none of their Big Durst Energy, and the knowing winks have only become bigger and knowing-er."

Among more critical reviews, Wall of Sound's Paul "Browny" Brown stated "Still Sucks showed signs of what Limp Bizkit do so well in the heavier side of music, but for me, they fell flat with some of the melodic aspects that they've managed to pull off so well in the past." Sputnikmusic's Simon K. gave the album a 3.8/5 and commented that the album "detonates right out of the gates with "Out of Style", "Dirty Rotten Bizkit" and "Dad Vibes", delivering classic, crunchy, syncopated grooves under Borland's multi-faceted and expressive elasticated riffs, while Durst grips the music with his tight flows," but criticized the album's short run time and that it "doesn’t have the time needed to justify all of those slower tracks" and the "arbitrary artistic choices tend to procrastinate and delay what works so frigging well here."

Loudwire named Still Sucks as the fourth best metal album of 2021, while ranking “Dad Vibes” as the number one rock song of the year (2021), stating that "Bizkit did what they've always done and delivered an irresistibly catchy, groove-laden banger guaranteed to get you bouncing along." Metal Hammer / Louder Sound placed the album at number 4 on their Top 10 Alt-Metal Albums of 2021 list, deeming it "exactly what most fans have been clamoring for, tongue firmly in cheek as they came back with some massive anthems set to bounding, chunky riffs." Sputnikmusic ranked Still Sucks as the number 15 album of the year, commenting "Still Sucks stands tall as a riotous distillation of everything we love and hate about the Jacksonville 5-piece."

== Track listing ==
No.	Title	Writer(s)	Length
1.	"Out of Style"	Fred Durst; Sam Rivers; John Otto; Wes Borland; DJ Lethal	3:22
2.	"Dirty Rotten Bizkit"	Durst; Rivers; Otto; Borland; Lethal	3:01
3.	"Dad Vibes"	Durst; Rivers; Otto; Borland	2:12
4.	"Turn It Up, Bitch"	Durst; Lethal	2:20
5.	"Don't Change" (INXS cover)	Garry Beers; Andrew Farriss; Jonathan Farriss; Timothy Farriss; Michael Hutchence; Kirk Pengilly	2:55
6.	"You Bring Out the Worst in Me"	Durst; Rivers; Otto; Borland	3:12
7.	"Love the Hate"	Durst; Rivers; Otto; Borland	1:56
8.	"Barnacle"	Durst; Rivers; Otto; Borland	1:55
9.	"Empty Hole"	Durst; Rivers	1:52
10.	"Pill Popper"	Durst; Rivers; Otto; Borland; Lethal	2:24
11.	"Snacky Poo"	Durst; Lethal	4:11
12.	"Goodbye"	Durst; Zakk Cervini	2:35
Total length:			31:55

=== Non-album singles ===
The following singles were originally intended to be on Stampede of the Disco Elephants, but were not included on the final iteration of Still Sucks. These songs are listed chronologically by their release dates.

Stampede of the Disco Elephants
No.	Title	Writer(s)	Length
1.	"Lightz (City of Angels)"		3:50
2.	"Ready to Go" (featuring Lil Wayne)	Durst; Borland; Rivers; Otto; Dwayne Carter Jr.; Paul Dawson; Jamal Jones	6:02
3.	"Thieves" (Ministry cover)	Alain Jourgensen; Paul Barker; Chris Connelly; Kevin Ogilvie	5:31
4.	"Endless Slaughter"		5:37

== Personnel ==
Limp Bizkit

- DJ Lethal – turntables, samples, programming
- Fred Durst – vocals
- John Otto – drums
- Sam Rivers – bass
- Wes Borland – guitars

Production

- Wes Borland – cover art design, art direction, illustration
- Zakk Cervini – production
- DJ Lethal – production on "Turn It Up, Bitch" and "Snacky Poo"
- Fred Durst – production
- Purps – production on "Dad Vibes"

== Charts ==
Chart performance for Still Sucks
Chart (2021)	Peak position
Australian Albums (ARIA)	35
Austrian Albums (Ö3 Austria)	29
Belgian Albums (Ultratop Flanders)	150
Belgian Albums (Ultratop Wallonia)	184
German Albums (Offizielle Top 100)	54
Japanese Hot Albums (Billboard Japan)	37
Swiss Albums (Schweizer Hitparade)	35
UK Albums (Official Charts)	79
UK Independent Albums (Official Charts)	17
UK Rock & Metal Albums (Official Charts)	14
US Billboard 200	155
US Independent Albums (Billboard)	17
US Top Alternative Albums (Billboard)	16
US Top Hard Rock Albums (Billboard)	7
US Top Rock Albums (Billboard)	26
