= Carina Round =

English musician (born 1979)

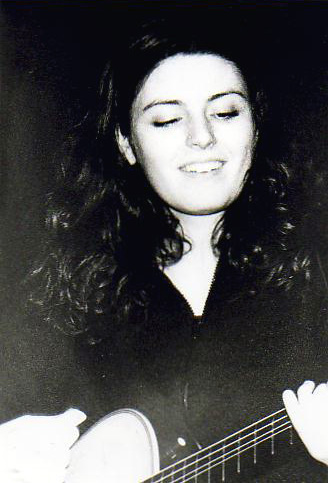
- Round in 2001

Background information
- Born: 20 April 1979 (age 47); Wolverhampton, England
- Genres: Alternative rock, indie rock
- Occupation: Musician
- Instruments: Vocals, guitar
- Years active: 1996–present
- Labels: Animal Noise, Interscope
- Member of: Puscifer, Early Winters
- Website: carinaround.com

Carina Round (born 20 April 1979) is an English singer-songwriter from Wolverhampton.

== Career ==
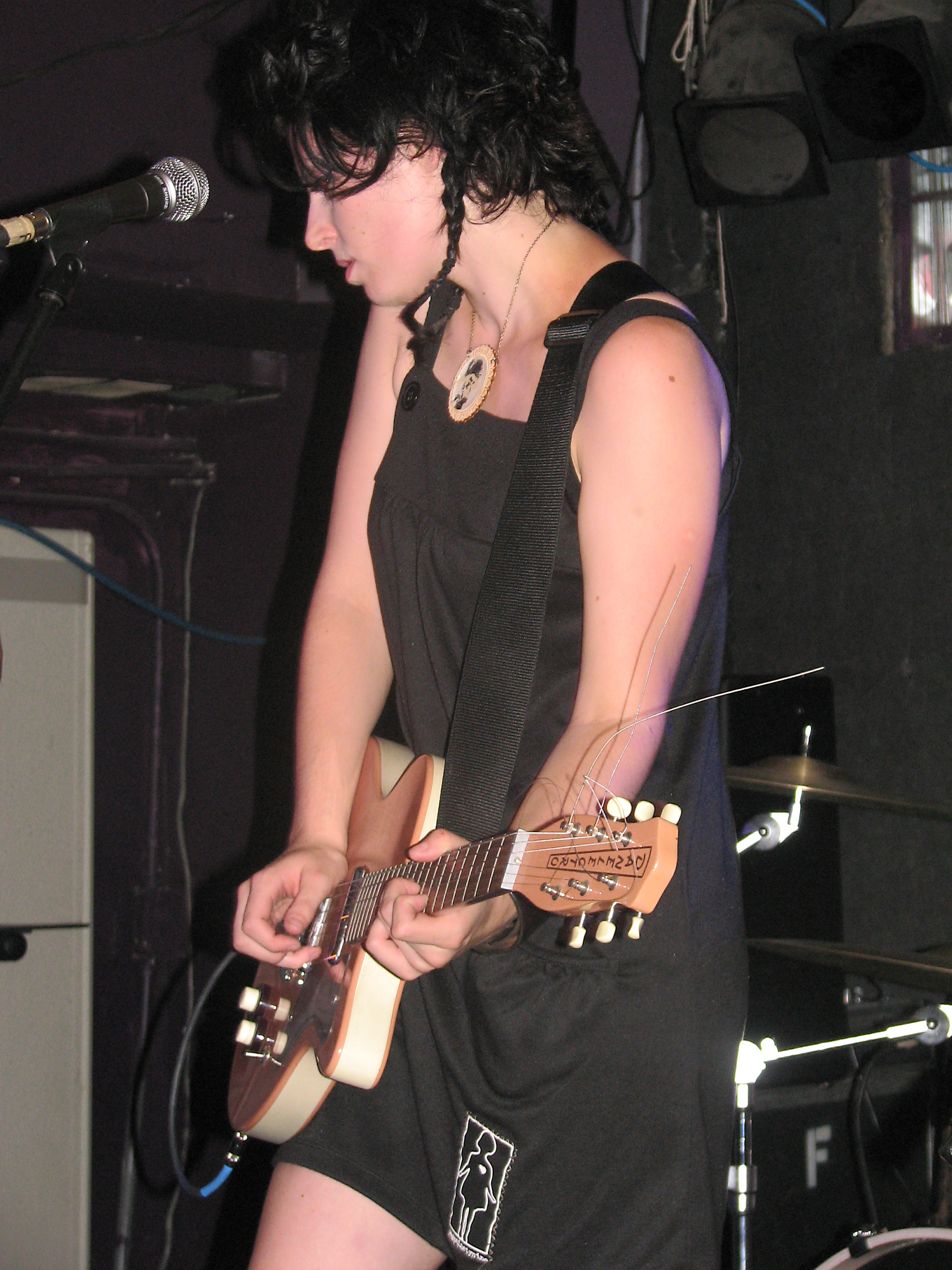
Round in DC in 2007

In the summer of 1996, following a gig in a basement acoustic club in Wolverhampton, Round was given a three-night support at Ronnie Scott's club in Birmingham. This led to support slots with the likes of David Gray, Miles Hunt, Ben Christophers, Mark Eitzel, Cousteau, Elbow, I am Kloot, Turin Brakes, Ed Harcourt and Ryan Adams, who after she supported him in Birmingham, invited her to be his guest at his London shows. At these shows, they again performed their co-written song "Idiots Dance" and "Come Pick Me Up" as encores. The following months saw Round joined by Simon Jason Smith on double-bass, Marcus Galley on drums and guitarist Tom Livemore. Their first gig together was a special one-off supporting Coldplay at the Birmingham Songwriters Festival.

The band recorded their debut album The First Blood Mystery at Magic Garden Studios with friend and producer Gavin Monaghan. The album was recorded and mixed in ten days, and released in the UK through Animal Noise in 2001. Round then toured the UK with Glenn Tilbrook.

Round returned in 2003 with The Disconnection, again recorded at Magic Garden Studios with Gavin Monaghan. The album was released in the UK with a cover shot by Anoushka Fisz (wife of Dave Stewart from Eurythmics who supported her since), then released in 2004 with a different, less visually disturbing cover photo, on Interscope in the US. The album garnered comparisons to Björk, Jeff Buckley and Robert Plant. Round promoted The Disconnection with a tour of the UK in late 2003, and another tour in January 2004. This was followed by a month-long tour of the US before returning to the UK for another tour with Damien Dempsey and James Blunt.

Round moved to LA in 2005 to produce Slow Motion Addict with Glen Ballard, which featured a more accessible, electronic-embellished sound. The album's release was delayed by a full year, but was eventually released in the US in 2007.

That same year, she appeared on "Cruel Melody", the title track of the debut album of Black Light Burns, a band fronted by Limp Bizkit guitarist Wes Borland. Also in 2007, Round was chosen as Annie Lennox's support act for her US tour, which was followed by dates in the UK later that year and in early 2008.

On the 12 May 2009, Round released a five-track EP called Things You Should Know. The EP is available on general digital release, with physical copies available only at her shows. Pre-orders of the digital EP came with two extra tracks – acoustic versions of "Do You" and "For Everything a Reason". A video and a remix are available for the first track on the EP, "Backseat".

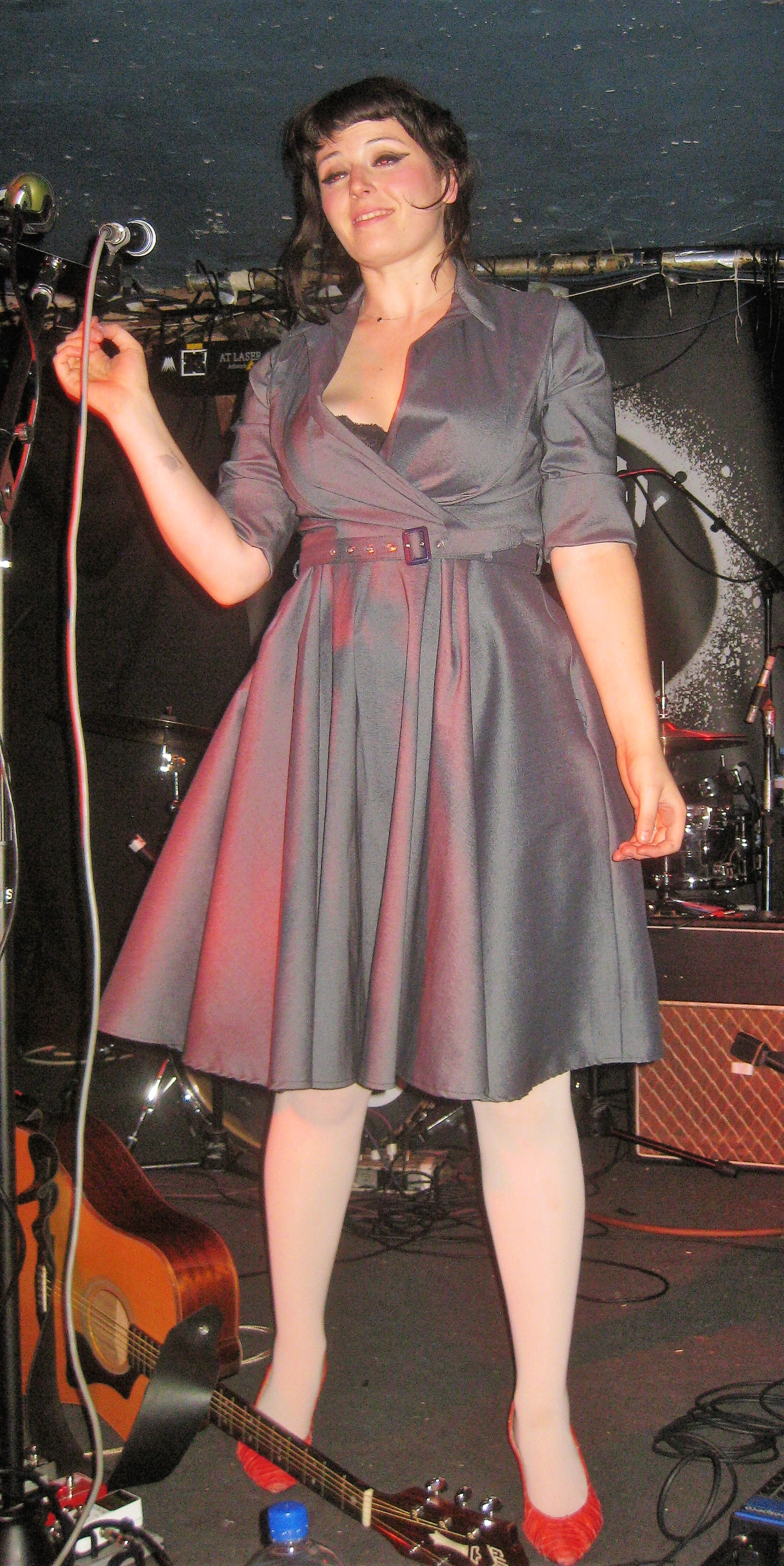
Round performs in 2012

In fall 2009 Round became a touring member of Puscifer, Maynard James Keenan's Arizona based project, working on their album Conditions of My Parole and began opening the live shows.

During this time, Round also sang on The Twilight Singers' album Dynamite Steps. She also worked with Ballard again and Oscar-nominated composer John Debney on a song composed for the film Valentines Day. She wrote with Academy Award nominee Marco Beltrami, as well as finishing up an album with her alt-country side project Early Winters, which was self-released earlier in the year.

Her songs 'For Everything A Reason' and 'Do You' are featured in the FX series American Horror Story.

In October 2011, it was announced that Round would be touring with Puscifer again. She opened for Puscifer at the Seattle, Washington opening show of the North American Conditions of My Parole tour on 7 November 2011. This was in addition to performing as a member of Puscifer.

Carina Round released Tigermending, an 11-track album produced by Round and Dan Burns on 1 May 2012 via Dehisce Records and distributed through The Orchard. Collaborators include Dave Stewart and Brian Eno ("The Secret of Drowning") and Billy Corgan ("Got to Go (2000 Years BC Mix").

She also appears as a guest vocalist on Valleyheart, the 2013 album by Canadian singer-songwriter Justin Rutledge, who is one of Round's bandmates in Early Winters. She also contributed vocals to the song "Turn Around" from his album "Early Widows."

In April 2013 she performed with Puscifer at Coachella and Lollapalooza Chile and Brazil.

In February 2014, she appears as a guest vocalist on the track, "I Feel" on Sierra Swan's album "Good Soldier", produced by Billy Corgan. She also appeared as a vocalist on tracks "In My Room" and "The Truth Is..." from Sierra Swan's album "Girl Who Cried Wolf" and collaborated with Sierra Swan in addition to Joel Shearer, Blair Sinta and Curt Schneider on a project called "Pushka," contributing vocals.

in 2014 she collaborated with Aiden Hawken on the song "Come Undone" from the album Making Patterns Rhyme: A Tribute to Duran Duran.

She provided guest vocals on "Tower" on The Beta Machine's album "All This Time."

In 2016 and 2019 she toured with Tears for Fears, handling backing vocals and singing joint lead on "Woman in Chains". She also performed backing vocals on several tracks for Tears For Fears' next album, The Tipping Point, released in 2022, and joined Tears for Fears on the first leg of their US tour to support the album.

== Discography ==
- 2001 – The First Blood Mystery
- 2003 – The Disconnection
- 2004 – Into My Blood (Single)
- 2004 – Lacuna (EP)
- 2007 – Slow Motion Addict
- 2009 – Things You Should Know (Digital EP – Released 12 May 2009)
- 2011 – The First Blood Mystery (10 Year Anniversary Edition) – Re-issue of debut album on 12" vinyl and download with exclusive new acoustic versions of "The Waves" and "Ribbons", plus the original 4-track demo of "Lightbulb Song"
- 2011 – "The Last Time" (Single) – Released Nov. 2011 – featuring Sierra Swan along with a Puscifer remix of "Girl and the Ghost" on Limited Edition 7" Vinyl
- 2012 – Tigermending (Released 1 May 2012)
- 2014 – Come Undone (Single) – Featuring Aidan Hawken and Zac Rae, a cover of Duran Duran's 1993 single
- 2015 - Tigermixes - Record Store Day double-LP release featuring remixes of all songs from the 2012 album Tigermending
- 2016 - Deranged to Divine - Career retrospective spanning 2001–2015
- 2025 - The Disconnection Live - Live performance of The Disconnection recorded in January 2024, soundtrack of The Disconnection XX concert film

=== With Curt Smith ===
- 2013 - Deceptively Heavy - Lead Vocals on “Hold It Together” & Backing Vocals on “Beautiful Failure”

=== With Puscifer ===
- 2009 – "C" Is for...
- 2010 – Sound into Blood into Wine
- 2011 – Conditions of My Parole
- 2013 – Donkey Punch the Night
- 2013 - What Is... Puscifer
- 2015 – Money Shot
- 2020 – Existential Reckoning
- 2021 - Live At Arcosanti
- 2022 - V Is For Versatile
- 2022 - Parole Violator
- 2023 - Global Probing
- 2026 - Normal Isn't

=== With Early Winters ===
- 2011 – Early Winters
- 2014 – Vanishing Act
- 2017 - I Want to Break Your Heart
