= Cover Your Heart and the Anvil Pants Odyssey =

Cover Your Heart

Compilation album by Black Light Burns
- Released: August 5, 2008
- Recorded: YMA Studios Burbank, CA
- Genres: Alternative rock, industrial metal
- Length: 59:02
- Label: I AM: WOLFPACK
- Producer: Wes Borland

Black Light Burns chronology
Cruel Melody (2007)	Cover Your Heart (2008)	The Moment You Realize You're Going to Fall (2012)

Professional ratings
Review scores
Source	Rating
Sputnik Music	3/5 stars

Cover Your Heart is a compilation album by American rock band Black Light Burns. It consists of a CD (Cover Your Heart) and a DVD (The Anvil Pants Odyssey), which was a professionally shot documentary of when Black Light Burns was touring for roughly a year and a half on their debut album Cruel Melody, which preceded this release.

== Track listing ==
#	Title	Time	Songwriter(s)	Notes
1	"Forkboy"	4:04	Paul G. Barker, Jello Biafra, Al Jourgensen, Will Fredrick Rieflin, Jeffery Thomas Ward	Originally performed by Lard
2	"So Alive"	3:33	Daniel Ash, Kevin Michael Dompe, David J. Haskins	Originally performed by Love and Rockets
3	"Hungry Like the Wolf"	3:44	Nicholas James Bates, Simon John Le Bon, Andrew Taylor, John Nigel Taylor, Roger Taylor	Originally performed by Duran Duran
4	"Lucretia My Reflection"	4:32	Andrew Eldritch	Originally performed by The Sisters of Mercy
5	"Rid of Me"	4:09	Polly Jean Harvey	Originally performed by PJ Harvey
6	"The Art of Self Defense"	2:46	Duane Paul Denison, Carey McNeilly, David WM Sims, David Lambeth Yow	Originally performed by The Jesus Lizard
7	"On the Bound"	4:56	Fiona Apple, Maude Maggart	Originally performed by Fiona Apple
8	"I Am the Sun"	3:10	Michael Rolfe Gira	Originally performed by Swans
9	"Blood Red Head on Fire"	3:53	Wes Borland	Originally performed by Big Dumb Face
10	"Search & Destroy"	3:20	Iggy Pop, James Robert Williamson	Originally performed by The Stooges
11	"Drowning Together, Dying Alone"	5:08	Wes Borland	Previously unreleased instrumental from Cruel Melody recording sessions
12	"Failing"	3:55	Wes Borland	Previously unreleased instrumental from Cruel Melody recording sessions
13	"Ribbons"	1:50	Wes Borland	Previously unreleased instrumental from Cruel Melody recording sessions
14	"Zargon Marfoauf"	1:36	Wes Borland	Previously unreleased instrumental from Cruel Melody recording sessions
15	"Vennisoun"	2:04	Wes Borland	Previously unreleased instrumental from Cruel Melody recording sessions
16	"Zlitchufdux"	1:46	Wes Borland	Previously unreleased instrumental from Cruel Melody recording sessions
17	"Giving in Again"	4:36	Wes Borland	Previously unreleased instrumental from Cruel Melody recording sessions

== Personnel ==
- Wes Borland – vocals, lead guitar, bass, keyboards, synthesizers, programming, producer, mixing
- Marshall Kilpatric – drums, percussion (on 1-10 and 14)
- Nick Annis – rhythm guitar on (1, 2 and 5)
- Sean Fetterman – bass on (2 and 5)
- Greg Isabelle – drums (on 12)
- Jeff Hannan – engineering, mixing
- Austin Satterfield – engineering assistant
- Dave Collins – mastering

== DVD ==
The DVD "Anvil Pants Odyssey" consists of a nearly two-hour-long documentary with the band, the music videos for "Mesopotamia," "4 Walls," and "Lie," and also features a behind the scenes look at the making of the "Lie" video. The DVD's content was primarily filmed during the summer and fall of 2007 and was filmed and edited by Satchel Underwood, including the video for "Mesopotamia" and the making of "Lie" segment. The video for "Lie" was directed by Josh Evans, while the video for "4 Walls" was directed by Wes Borland.
