= Crystal Machete =

Studio album by Wes Borland
- Released: May 3, 2016
- Genre: Post-rock
- Length: 60:15
- Language: English
- Label: Edison Sound

Wes Borland chronology
| Crystal Machete (2016) | Matadors and Daughters (2018) |

Crystal Machete is an instrumental solo album by Wes Borland, guitarist of Limp Bizkit and frontman of Black Light Burns. The album was conceived as a soundtrack to an imaginary '80s movie. While recording the album, Borland imposed the following guidelines upon himself: no distorted guitars, no human vocals, and as little outside help as possible.

The album was released in May 2016 to positive reviews. For example, Antiquiet praised Borland's ability to rise to the challenges of the self-imposed limitations, while Drowned in Sound found the album to be "a beautiful, sprawling post-rock mini epic".

The album received a vinyl release on the label Edison Sound in September 2016.

== Track listing ==
All songs written and composed by Wes Borland.

1. "Main Titles" - 6:29
2. "Vltava" - 3:12
3. "Jubilee" - 4:33
4. "White Stallion" - 4:47
5. "Sayonara Big C" - 1:27
6. "Svalbard" - 11:07
7. "Son of a Gun" - 4:00
8. "Reprise" - 4:06
9. "Crystal Machete" - 5:23
10. "The Cliffs" - 7:33
11. "Ithaca" (vinyl edition bonus track)
12. "End Credits" - 8:53
