= Endless Slaughter =

Promotional single by Limp Bizkit
- Released: August 1, 2014
- Recorded: 2014
- Genre: Nu metal; experimental
- Length: 5:37
- Label: Cash Money

Limp Bizkit singles chronology
| "Thieves" (2013) | "Endless Slaughter" (2014) | "Dad Vibes" (2021) |

Alternative cover
- Cassette artwork

"Endless Slaughter" is a song by American rap rock band Limp Bizkit, released as a free download on August 1, 2014, initially to promote their sixth studio album which was then tentatively titled Stampede of the Disco Elephants. It was ultimately excluded from the album as well as previous singles.

== Release ==
The song was originally intended to be released on cassette during their European tour. When the cassettes were delayed, the track was made available on their site as a free download.

== Composition ==
The song itself is divided into four segments that cover a wide range of genres: part one is a two-minute experimental metal segment from which "Endless Slaughter" gets its name; it is the longest and most structured part of the song.

Part two is a softer, somewhat ambient interlude that leads into part three; a glam metal-oriented breakdown and the shortest segment, lasting about 40 seconds.

The fourth and final part starts with a distorted guitar solo and quickly becomes a hip-hop song that ends abruptly.

== Music video ==
The music video, released on August 24, was filmed during the band's European tour, and consists of four long takes for each band member and each part of the song, Otto and Durst's portions were filmed at the Patronaat.

== Critical reception ==
The song has had a mixed reception with critics and fans alike.

== Personnel ==
Limp Bizkit

- Fred Durst – vocals
- Wes Borland – guitars
- John Otto – drums
- Sam Rivers – bass guitar

Recording staff

- Logan Mader – mixing engineer
- Maor Appelbaum – mastering engineer
