= Cruel Melody =

Studio album by Black Light Burns
- Released: June 5, 2007
- Recorded: 2005–2006
- Studio: Castel Renholder Studios (Los Angeles, California)
- Genres: Industrial rock, alternative rock, alternative metal
- Length: 62:33
- Label: I AM: WOLFPACK
- Producer: Danny Lohner

Black Light Burns chronology
Cruel Melody (2007)	Cover Your Heart and the Anvil Pants Odyssey (2008)

Cruel Melody is the debut album of American rock band Black Light Burns, released on June 5, 2007, through Ross Robinson's label I AM: WOLFPACK. The album is an outcome of frontman Wes Borland's efforts after his departure from Limp Bizkit in 2001, after which he took part in many projects such as Eat the Day and The Damning Well. After receiving additional inputs from then members Danny Lohner, Josh Freese and Josh Eustis, Cruel Melody was released in the spring of 2007.

== Background ==
Wes Borland began writing in early 2004 a solo album of mainly melodic and esoteric material after he disbanded his projects such as Big Dumb Face, Eat the Day and The Damning Well but slightly before he rejoined Limp Bizkit in mid-2004. During this time Borland was offered the touring guitarist spot in Nine Inch Nails, and frontman Trent Reznor offered his opinions on the material as it was at the time. He encouraged Borland to "not sing like someone was asleep in the next room" and make it a heavier affair, while coincidentally Borland was changing the material slowly more into that. While the songs were written by Borland, he did have additional input from producer Danny Lohner, drummer Josh Freese (both ex-members of The Damning Well) and the keyboards and additional engineering were assisted by Josh Eustis.

The song "I Have a Need" was instrumentally written to be included on the Limp Bizkit release The Unquestionable Truth (Part 1), but was cut in order for the EP to remain mostly metal oriented. It features Limp Bizkit's bassist Sam Rivers on the track, and Borland was allowed to use the song for Black Light Burns when the song was turned down for use by Limp Bizkit.

== Release and promotion ==
Cruel Melody was released on June 5, 2007, selling 6,000 copies in its first week in the US according to Indiehq.com.

Black Light Burns toured extensively in America, starting slightly before the album release and for about the next year and a half, doing headline dates, music festivals, and opening for Sevendust. There were difficulties in shows being under promoted, but the band persisted. The touring in support for the album was documented professionally, and released on the bonus DVD to the band's then upcoming cover's album, Cover Your Heart and the Anvil Pants Odyssey.

The song "Lie" served as the first single from the album, going to radio on March 20. A music video was released soon after this. The tracks "4 Walls" and "Animal" are used in Season 2 of TV series Burn Notice. The track "Stop a Bullet" is used in the launch trailer for the videogame Ghost Recon: Future Soldier.

On July 13, 2007 Black Light Burns was featured on the late night talk show Last Call with Carson Daly where they performed "Lie."

== Reception ==
Professional ratings
Review scores
Source	Rating
Allmusic	3.5/5 stars

Allmusic writer Greg Prato wrote a positive review, stating: "For many, Borland was the only Limp Bizkit member who was taken seriously. As evidenced by Cruel Melody, he is now officially allowed to follow whichever musical path he so desires."

== Track listing ==
All songs written and composed by Wes Borland.

No.	Title	Length
1.	"Mesopotamia"	4:27
2.	"Animal"	4:08
3.	"Lie"	4:19
4.	"Coward" (feat. Sonny Moore)	4:36
5.	"Cruel Melody" (feat. Carina Round)	5:00
6.	"The Mark"	3:13
7.	"I Have a Need" (feat. Sam Rivers)	4:24
8.	"4 Walls"	3:51
9.	"Stop a Bullet"	3:37
10.	"One of Yours"	4:51
11.	"New Hunger"	5:24
12.	"I Am Where It Takes Me" (feat. Johnette Napolitano)	6:09
13.	"Iodine Sky"	8:30
Total length:		62:29

iTunes bonus tracks
No.	Title	Length
14.	"Fall Below"	4:16
Total length:		66:45

European & Japanese edition bonus tracks
No.	Title	Length
14.	"Kill the Queen"	4:56
Total length:		67:21

Limited edition bonus tracks
No.	Title	Length
14.	"Kill the Queen"	4:54
15.	"Fall Below"	4:15
16.	"Mesopotamia" (Assyrian mix)	5:45
17.	"Lie" (Seth Vogt mix)	6:27
Total length:		83:40

Best Buy edition downloadable bonus tracks
No.	Title	Length
1.	"Kill the Queen"	4:56
2.	"Lie" (Daniel from Idiot Pilot Remix)	4:14
Total length:		09:10

Limited edition bonus DVD
No.	Title	Length
1.	"Mesopotamia" (Music video)	4:29
2.	"Lie" (Music video)	4:21
3.	"4 Walls" (Music video)	3:54
Total length:		12:44

Bonus tracks

- "Kill the Queen" (Best Buy bonus track) - 4:56
- "Fall Below" (iTunes bonus track) - 4:16
- "Lie" (Daniel from Idiot Pilot Remix) - 4:14

European bonus tracks

- "Mesopotamia" (Assyrian Mix) - 5:45
- "Lie" (Seth Vogt Mix) - 6:27

== Personnel ==
- Wes Borland – vocals, lead guitar, bass, programming, percussion, synths, piano, rhodes, violin, cello, drums (on 13), mixing (on 13)
- Danny Lohner – rhythm guitar (on 4 and 11), additional bass (on 3 and 4), programming, producer, sound design
- Josh Eustis – synths, sound design, engineering
- Josh Freese – drums, live percussion
- Charlie Clouser – additional programming (on 3)
- Sonny Moore – additional vocal (on 4)
- Carina Round – additional vocal (on 5)
- Sam Rivers – bass (on 7)
- Johnette Napolitano – additional vocal (on 12)
- Tom Lord-Alge – mixing on all songs except (1 and 13)
- Femio Hernandaz – co-mixing on all songs except (1 and 13)
- Critter – engineering
- Ross Robinson – mixing (on 1)
- Ryan Boesch – co-mixing (on 1)

String section

String instruments on (11 and 12)

- Eric Gorfain – violin
- Daphne Chen – violin
- Lea Katz – viola
- Richard Dodd – cello
- John Krovoza – cello
- Matt Cooker – cello

== Charts ==
Chart (2002)	Peak position
Canadian Albums (Billboard)	20
Australian Albums (ARIA)	25
New Zealand Albums (RMNZ)	17
UK Albums (Official Charts)	71
US Billboard 200	133
US Heatseekers Albums (Billboard)	2
US Independent Albums (Billboard)	12
