= Thieves (Ministry song) =

1989 song by Ministry

Song by Ministry

from the album The Mind Is a Terrible Thing to Taste
- Recorded: 1989
- Studio: Chicago Trax Studios
- Genre: Industrial metal
- Length: 5:02
- Label: Sire; Warner Bros.
- Songwriters: Al Jourgensen; Paul Barker; Chris Connelly; Nivek Ogre; (Note: Nivek Ogre was credited by his legal name, Kevin Ogilvie, in the liner notes of The Mind Is a Terrible Thing to Taste. In the liner notes of an audio version of the live album In Case You Didn't Feel Like Showing Up, Bill Rieflin was credited as a co-writer, instead of Ogre.)
- Producers: Hypo Luxa; Hermes Pan

"Thieves" is a song by American industrial metal band Ministry. It was released as the opening track from the band's fourth studio album, The Mind Is a Terrible Thing to Taste (1989), as well as the B-side from its single, "Burning Inside". The song's lyrics deal mainly with political corruption. The song includes dialogue samples from R. Lee Ermey's drill instructor character in Full Metal Jacket. Ministry's version was featured in the 1992 science fiction film Freejack, also in the 2009 video game Brütal Legend.

== Overview ==
The song is based on a harmonic stasis. It features the extensive use of E minor chord. 118 out of 138 measures of the song are based on the same E minor chord, while the rest are F minor chords. Al Jourgensen sings only the G note, while the song "shifts gears rhythmically" through its sections and quadruples its tempo.

Tom Moon, the author of 1,000 Recordings to Hear Before You Die, wrote, "At the two minute mark of "Thieves" and several times later in the song, Ministry's pulse is bolstered by what sounds like a whirring pneumatic drill. It's not a gimmick—it almost functions as a solo guitar, adding punctuation."

== Personnel ==
=== Ministry ===
- Al Jourgensen – vocals, guitars, programming, production
- Paul Barker – bass, programming, production

=== Additional personnel ===
- William Rieflin – drums, programming
- Joe Kelly – backing vocals

== Limp Bizkit cover ==
"Thieves"

Promotional single by Limp Bizkit
- Released: November 1, 2013
- Recorded: 2012–2013
- Genre: Nu metal; industrial metal
- Length: 5:31
- Label: Cash Money
- Songwriters: Al Jourgensen; Paul Barker; Chris Connelly; Nivek Ogre

Limp Bizkit chronology
"Ready to Go" (2013)	"Thieves" (2013)	"Endless Slaughter" (2014)

American rap rock band Limp Bizkit covered parts of this song during their performance at Woodstock 99 as well as releasing their cover version of "Thieves" as a single via Twitter on November 1, 2013, for free download. Limp Bizkit performed it throughout many of the band's live sets since 1997, but the band did not release a studio version until 2013. Limp Bizkit's version does not include the samples that are on Ministry's version.

=== Personnel ===
==== Limp Bizkit ====
- Wes Borland – guitars
- Fred Durst – vocals
- John Otto – drums
- Sam Rivers – bass
