= Slow Motion Addict =

Studio album by Carina Round
- Released: May 22, 2007
- Genres: Alternative rock; post-punk revival
- Length: 45:52
- Label: Interscope
- Producer: Glen Ballard

Carina Round chronology
The Disconnection (2003)	Slow Motion Addict (2007)	Things You Should Know (2009)

Professional ratings
Review scores
Source	Rating
AllMusic	3.5/5 stars
Music Box	3/5 stars
Slant Magazine	3.5/5 stars

Slow Motion Addict is the third album by Carina Round. Its release date was pushed back from August 22, 2006 to June 5, 2007. "Downslow" was the first single on the album. The title Slow Motion Addict is taken from a self-portrait by Anoushka Fisz.

== Track listing ==
1. "Stolen Car" — 3:28 (Carina Round, Tom J. Livemore, Simon Jason Smith)
2. "How Many Times" — 3:16 (Carina Round)
3. "Gravity Lies" — 4:13 (Carina Round, Tom J. Livemore)
4. "Ready To Confess" — 2:59 (Carina Round, Glen Ballard, Tom J. Livemore, Simon Jason Smith, John Large)
5. "Want More" — 4:40 (Carina Round, Samuel Stewart)
6. "Take The Money" — 2:56 (Carina Round, Tom J. Livemore)
7. "Downslow" — 3:43 (Carina Round, Tom J. Livemore, Simon Jason Smith, John Large)
8. "Come To You" — 4:08 (Carina Round, Gary Go)
9. "Slow Motion Addict" — 4:25 (Carina Round, Tom J. Livemore, Simon Jason Smith)
10. "January Heart" — 4:13 (Carina Round)
11. "The Disconnection" (Long Version) — 5:06 (Carina Round)
12. "The City" — 5:13 (Carina Round, Tom J. Livemore)

iTunes bonus track

13. "Same Girlfriend" — 3:38

The bonus track is also hidden in the pre-gap on track one of the CD. Simply start up the disc and hold down the rewind button to find it.

=== Bonus Disc — Tease and Sting EP ===
1. "Ready to Confess" [Acoustic] — 0.00
2. "Stolen Car" [Electro-Acoustic Mix] — 0.00
3. "Come To You" [Electro-Acoustic Mix] — 0.00

A bonus promo EP called Tease and Sting EP was included on some limited edition releases of Slow Motion Addict.

== Slow Motion Addict — The Film ==
To promote the album a feature-length film was made called Slow Motion Addict, including a video for 12 of the 13 songs featured on Slow Motion Addict. The films were directed by Jesse Davey.

Round stars in twelve episodes based around tracks from her album of the same name. Throughout the cycle of songs, she plays the character "Maisie Scarlett", who at first glance seems to be an everyday type of girl but who in fact is caught in a nightmarish situation where a small part of her soul dies every day. Over time, she experiences a series of small emotional deaths and must choose to continue her surreal journey or engage directly with the demons who torment her. Directed by award-winning filmmaker Jesse Davey, the film is entirely set to music but is nonetheless far from a conventional video promo. The episodes became a notably addictive summer phenomenon when first released over the Internet.

== Personnel ==
Musicians

- Carina Round — vocals, guitar, piano, electronic beats
- Tom Livemore — fancy guitar, piano, synth
- Simon Smith — bass, synth bass
- John Large — drums, percussion, celeste, chihuahua

Additional Musicians

- Glen Ballard — synth on "How Many Times" and "Slow Motion Addict"; piano on "The City"
- Walter Miranda — piano on "The Disconnection"
- Brian MacLeod — drums on "Come To You"
- Sam Stewart — guitar and bass on "Want More"
- David A. Stewart — guitar on "Come To You"
- Eric Mayron — piano and background vocals on "Money"
- Ernie Gonzalez — background vocals on "Money"
- Gary Go — piano, mellotron, string arrangement, programming, some pro-tools on "Come To You"
- Oli James, Scott James and Matt Barr - backing vocals on "Come To You"

Production

- Produced by Glen Ballard
- Recorded and Mixed by Scott Campbell
