= Shotgun (Limp Bizkit song) =

Single by Limp Bizkit

from the album Gold Cobra
- Released: May 17, 2011
- Genre: Nu metal; rap metal
- Length: 4:33
- Label: Flip; Interscope
- Songwriters: Fred Durst; Wes Borland; John Otto; Sam Rivers
- Producer: Fred Durst

Limp Bizkit singles chronology
"Home Sweet Home/Bittersweet Symphony" (2005)	"Shotgun" (2011)	"Gold Cobra" (2011)

"Shotgun" is a song by American nu metal band Limp Bizkit from their fifth studio album, Gold Cobra (2011). Notable for showcasing the guitar playing of Wes Borland and production by DJ Lethal. Written by Fred Durst, Borland, DJ Lethal, John Otto and Sam Rivers, the song describes sitting at home brandishing a shotgun.

"Shotgun" distinguishes itself from the style that the band is better known for with its heavier, guitar-driven style, as opposed to previous songs by the group, which were driven by the production of turntablist and sound designer DJ Lethal, and features a solo by Borland, something that Limp Bizkit is not generally known for. It was released as the album's first single in May 2011, and peaked at number 26 on the Canadian Rock Chart. The song was favorably received by critics, who appraised Borland's heavy guitar playing, and DJ Lethal's sound design.

== Music and lyrics ==
"Shotgun" (sample)
"Shotgun" highlights Borland's unique playing style in this solo.

Fred Durst's lyrics describe sitting at home smoking cannabis while brandishing a shotgun.

"Shotgun" prominently features the unique guitar playing of Wes Borland, as opposed to the songs on earlier albums by the band, which were driven by DJ Lethal's sound design. Borland closes the song with a solo, which Limp Bizkit is not known for.

The music video shows an aggressive live performance of the band taking from a promo tour of the Gold Cobra album, interspersed with lyrics.

== Reception ==
IGN writer Chad Grischow wrote, "Borland's achy guitar bobbing and weaving through the heavy beat of "Shotgun" delivers some of the album's best guitar work". Metal Hammer writer Terry Bezer also appraised the song, writing "The fist-pumping, riot-starting chorus is a guaranteed winner". PopMatters writer Josh Langhoff wrote, "Guitarist Wes Borland pulls off one huge catchy riff after another, and he and DJ Lethal add sound effects that alter ['Shotgun'] subtly and not-so-subtly."

== Personnel ==
Limp Bizkit

- Fred Durst – vocals
- Wes Borland – guitars
- DJ Lethal – turntables, samples, synthesizers
- John Otto – drums
- Sam Rivers – bass

== Charts ==
Chart (2011)	Peak position
Canada Active Rock (America's Music Charts)	26
Canada Rock (Billboard)	49
Denmark (Tracklisten)	23
Finland (Suomen virallinen lista)	25
Spain (Promusicae)	27
UK Rock & Metal (OCC)	8
US Rock Digital Song Sales (Billboard)	31

== Release history ==
Region	Date	Format	Label
United States	May 17, 2011	Digital download	Interscope; Polydor
United Kingdom	May 18, 2011	Digital download	Interscope; Polydor
