= The First Blood Mystery =

Studio album by Carina Round
- Released: May 15, 2001
- Genre: Rock
- Length: 36:50
- Label: Animal Noise
- Producers: Carina Round, Gavin Monaghan

Carina Round chronology
The First Blood Mystery (2001)	The Disconnection (2004)

Professional ratings
Review scores
Source	Rating
AllMusic	3/5 stars

The First Blood Mystery is the debut album of Carina Round. It was released in May 2001 on Animal Noise records. The title, The First Blood Mystery, is a reference to psychologist Erich Neumann's theory of feminine development. The album was recorded at Magic Garden Studios with friend and producer Gavin Monaghan. The album was recorded and mixed in ten days.

== Track listing ==
All songs written by Carina Round.

1. "Message to Apollo" — 5:41
2. "Lightbulb Song" — 4:51
3. "How I See It" — 3:01
4. "The Waves" — 5:29
5. "Let It Fall" — 4:49
6. "Ribbons" — 5:36
7. "On Leaving" — 7:27

== Personnel ==
=== Musicians ===
- Carina Round — voices, acoustic guitar
- Simon Smith — all stand up bass
- Marcus Galley — drums (except Let It Fall)

=== Additional musicians ===
- Carina Round — piano, percussion on "Message to Apollo"; electric bass and guitar on "Lightbulb Song"; piano, korg on "The Waves"
- Gavin Monaghan — Spanish and electric guitars on "Message To Apollo"; rhodes, loop on "Lightbulb Song"; piano on "How I See It"; electric guitar, korg, loop on "The Waves"; Spanish guitar on "Let It Fall"; electric guitar, space echo operator on "On Leaving"
- Simon Smith — scank guitar on "Lightbulb Song"; accordion on "Let It Fall"; space bass on "On Leaving"
- Lisa Mallet — flute on "Lightbulb Song"; flute on "The Waves"
- Paul Bennett — mute trumpet on "How I See It"
- Liam McKahey — male voices on "How I See It"
- Chrissy Van Dyke — female backing voices on "How I See It"
- Ryann Snow — drums, percussion on "Let It Fall"
- Martin Riley — piano on "Let It Fall"
- Chloe Millar — violin on "Ribbons"
- Sally Michin — violin on "Ribbons"
- Scott Harris — viola on "Ribbons"
- Ed Smith — cello on "Ribbons"
- Davey Ray Moor — rhodes, piano on "On Leaving"

=== Production ===
- Gavin Monaghan — producer and mixer
- Andy Taylor — engineer and pro-tools operator
- Mastered by Guy Davie at The Exchange
