= Duke Lion Fights the Terror!! =

Studio album by Big Dumb Face
- Released: March 6, 2001
- Genre: Experimental rock, comedy rock, death metal
- Length: 51:23
- Label: Flip/Interscope/Flawless
- Producer: Wes Borland

Big Dumb Face chronology
Duke Lion Fights the Terror!! (2001)	Where Is Duke Lion? He's Dead... (2017)

Singles from Duke Lion Fights the Terror!!
- 1. "Duke Lion" Released: 2001; 2. "Rebel" Released: 2002

Professional ratings
Aggregate scores
Source	Rating
Metacritic	50/100
Review scores
Source	Rating
AllMusic	2.5/5 stars
Entertainment Weekly	C−
Kerrang!	1/5 stars
Metal Hammer	7/10
NME	4/10
Rock Sound	1/5 stars
Rolling Stone	3/5 stars
Wall of Sound	73/100

Duke Lion Fights the Terror!! is the debut album by Big Dumb Face. The album is noted for its comedic lyrics and shifts in musical style, encompassing multiple genres of music.

Released on March 6, 2001, the album was recorded while Wes Borland was still a member of the nu metal band Limp Bizkit, shortly before his brief departure from that band. Duke Lion Fights the Terror!! received mixed reviews, with reviewers unfavorably comparing the album's music to that of Ween, which Big Dumb Face was influenced by.

== Production ==
The album was recorded for Flip/Interscope Records, the labels of Wes Borland's other band, Limp Bizkit, and Flawless Records, a vanity label formed as a Geffen subsidiary by Limp Bizkit frontman Fred Durst, who served as an executive producer for Duke Lion Fights the Terror!!

The album was recorded while Borland was still a member of Limp Bizkit, prior to his brief departure from that band.

The song "Organ Splitter" incorporates a sample from the 1983 Canadian comedy film Strange Brew. Wes Borland performed most of the instruments and vocals on the album, with the band's co-founder Scott Borland playing keyboards, providing backup vocals and turntable scratching on the album's final track, "It's Right In Here".

== Music and lyrics ==
The musical style of Duke Lion Fights the Terror!! was influenced by Ween and Mr. Bungle. Wes Borland stated that the album's music is "really silly and idiotic and bizarre. [...] It's nothing but stupid [...] just all these retarded songs."

Deseret News writer Scott Iwasaki described the album's music as "riotous meanderings that tap into early grindcore grooves and Captain Beefheart psychedelia".

== Reception ==
Reviews of Duke Lion Fights the Terror!! were mixed. AllMusic writer Kieran McCarthy dismissed Duke Lion Fights the Terror as "a mediocre Ween rip-off", while Entertainment Weekly writer Robert Cherry wrote, "Dumb? Check. Big? Not likely. But at least Duke Lion Fights the Terror isn't only about the nookie."

A positive review appeared in the Deseret News in which writer Scott Iwasaki, giving the album three stars, stated, "Duke Lion Fights the Terror!! captures Borland, as Big Dumb Face, at his most spontaneous". Bloody Good Horror writer D.M, in a mixed to favorable review, wrote, "The album’s concept is so scattershot that it’s unfathomable to call the album a cohesive whole."

== Track listing ==
All songs, lyrics and music by Wes Borland.

1. "Burgalveist" – 2:47
2. "Duke Lion" – 2:00
3. "Kali Is the Sweethog" – 2:45
4. "Blood Red Head on Fire" – 3:42
5. "Space Adventure" – 2:40
6. "Fightin' Stance" – 2:32
7. "Organ Splitter" – 2:10
8. "Mighty Penis Laser" – 5:31
9. "Robot" – 1:03
10. "Rebel" – 3:26
11. "Voices in the Wall" – 2:58
12. "It's Right in Here" – 19:43

== Personnel ==
- Wes Borland - vocals, guitars, electric bass, banjo
- Scott Borland - keyboards, turntables, vocals
- Kyle Weeks - vocals, bongos, sampling
- Greg Isabelle - drums, vocals

== Charts ==
Chart (2001)	Peak position
US Billboard 200	194
US Heatseekers (Billboard)	16
