= The Moment You Realize You're Going to Fall =

Studio album by Black Light Burns
- Released: August 13, 2012
- Recorded: 2009–2012
- Genres: Industrial rock; alternative rock; alternative metal; experimental rock
- Length: 65:43
- Labels: Rocket Science Ventures; THC Music; RED Distribution

Black Light Burns chronology
Cover Your Heart and the Anvil Pants Odyssey (2008)	The Moment You Realize You're Going to Fall (2012)	Lotus Island (2013)

Singles from The Moment You Realize You're Going to Fall
- 1. "Scream Hallelujah" Released: July 15, 2012; 2. "Splayed" Released: August 30, 2012; 3. "The Moment You Realize You're Going to Fall" Released: October 17, 2012; 4. "How to Look Naked" Released: January 7, 2013

The Moment You Realize You're Going to Fall ratings
Review scores
Source	Rating
Sputnikmusic	4.5/5

The Moment You Realize You're Going to Fall is the second studio album by American industrial rock band Black Light Burns, released on August 13, 2012, in the UK and on August 14, 2012, in the US. The first song released from the album, "I Want You To", was released in 2009, on the soundtrack to Underworld: Rise of the Lycans. "Scream Hallelujah" was released on June 1, 2012, when the full track listing and release date were also announced. Another song, "Splayed", was made available for free download on June 29.

The band released 3 different videos marked as chapters in order to promote the release of the album. The first chapter is a trailer video directed by Agata Alexander, that contains an edited version of the title track. It has also been revealed through the band's Facebook account that a video for the single "How to Look Naked" is being filmed and it was released September 14, 2012 on Vimeo.

== Track listing ==
No.	Title	Length
1.	"How to Look Naked"	4:04
2.	"We Light Up"	4:09
3.	"I Want You To"	3:10
4.	"The Girl in Black"	4:17
5.	"The Colour Escapes"	4:00
6.	"Tiger by the Tail"	3:21
7.	"Your Head Will Be Rotting on a Spike"	3:13
8.	"Torch from the Sky"	6:26
9.	"Because of You"	3:16
10.	"Splayed"	3:34
11.	"Scream Hallelujah"	3:21
12.	"Bakelite"	7:00
13.	"Burn the World"	4:18
14.	"Grinning Like a Slit"	4:24
15.	"The Moment You Realize You're Going to Fall"	6:53

Bonus Tracks

No.	Title	Music	Length
16.	"War"	(Amazon.com bonus track)	3:24
17.	"My Gun"	(iTunes bonus track)	3:44

== Personnel ==
- Wes Borland – vocals, lead guitar, bass, keyboards, synthesizers, programming, engineering
- Nick Annis – rhythm guitar (on tracks 1–3, 8, 10 and 13)
- Marshall Kilpatric – drums (on tracks 1, 2, 4, 8, 9–11, 15) and bonus track "War"
- Anna Carlise – vocals (on track 13)
- Jana Lou Annis – violin (on track 13)
- Dave Shiffman – mixing
- Dave Donnelly – mastering
