= Lie (Black Light Burns song) =

Single by Black Light Burns

from the album Cruel Melody
- Released: March 20, 2007
- Length: 4:19
- Label: I am: Wolfpack
- Songwriter: Wes Borland
- Producers: Ross Robinson, Danny Lohner

Black Light Burns singles chronology
"Lie" (2007)	"4 Walls" (2007)

"Lie" is the first single by American rock band Black Light Burns from their debut album Cruel Melody. It was released to radio on March 20, 2007.

== Charts ==
Chart (2007)	Peak position
Denmark (Tracklisten)	35
Finland (Suomen virallinen lista)	33
Ireland (IRMA)	31
Spain (PROMUSICAE)	28
UK Rock (Official Charts Company)	21
US Rock Digital Songs (Billboard)	38
US Rock Songs (Billboard)	34
US Mainstream Rock (Billboard)	22
