= The Damning Well =

American rock band

- Genres: Industrial metal Alternative metal Industrial rock
- Years active: 2003
- Past members: Richard Patrick; Danny Lohner; Wes Borland; Josh Freese

The Damning Well was a rock supergroup comprising Wes Borland of Limp Bizkit on guitar, Danny Lohner formerly of Nine Inch Nails on bass, Richard Patrick of Filter on vocals, and Josh Freese of A Perfect Circle on drums. While rumors spread that an entire album had been recorded, Patrick has said on numerous occasions that this is false. Only two songs were recorded: "Awakening", which was released on Underworld movie soundtrack in 2003, and "Power", an unreleased track featuring Amy Lee of Evanescence on guest vocals.

== History ==
The project originated with the creation of the Underworld movie soundtrack in 2003. Danny Lohner, rock musician and producer previously involved with A Perfect Circle and Nine Inch Nails, was tasked with creating a soundtrack for the Underworld movie. Lohner recruited a large number of artists he had worked with in the past and had them collaborate, which created a number of atypical arrangements of artists on various tracks, such as Maynard James Keenan and David Bowie singing together on the track "Bring Me the Disco King". Among these variations, a group formed that was dubbed "The Damning Well", which consisted of Lohner on bass, Wes Borland of Limp Bizkit on guitar, Richard Patrick of Filter on vocals, and Josh Freese of A Perfect Circle on drums.

The group only formally released one track, titled "Awakening," on the Underworld soundtrack. After the completion of the soundtrack, rumors arose that an entire album's worth of material was apparently recorded with producer Terry Date, and that Amy Lee of Evanescence also contributed vocals to the track "Power", but her record label would not allow those to be released".

In 2008, Patrick cleared up misconceptions about the band, stating:

Most of [The Damning Well material] turned into Black Light Burns. There was a song called "Power" I wrote with Amy Lee, I wrote all the lyrics and everything and then Amy Lee came in and sang on it. Her manager was such a, just so hard to deal with which is like that with a lot of the things she gets involved with you know, they were just so hardcore that we were like forget it. There were only two songs recorded under the Damning Well, it wasn’t a whole record. But I have the Amy Lee song I did with her, she just came in and sang my lyrics and sang with me, it was cool sounding though, I was really proud of it. It’s now on the Black Light Burns record. So yeah, we did one song for the Underworld soundtrack and it just kind of petered out after that. I wrote another song for something else and that was really about it.

Patrick later said "Power" appeared as "Coward" on the Black Light Burns album Cruel Melody.

In 2010, Patrick said that while he had not talked to the members in years, he would still consider doing an album with The Damning Well. However, by 2013, he stated "that project is done for sure".

== Legacy ==
Borland, Freese, and Lohner started another band, Black Light Burns, in 2005, upon Borland temporarily leaving Limp Bizkit. It is often considered to be a spiritual successor to The Damning Well and contains bits and pieces of their work. The track "Power" was reworked into the track "Coward", and used in Black Light Burns as the fourth track of their debut album, Cruel Melody, without vocals from Patrick or Lee. Patrick claims to have a version with his and Lee's original vocals, but has not ever released said material. Additionally, some work is thought to have been carried on into Filter's 2008 release Anthems for the Damned, especially the song "In Dreams", which was written and composed by Patrick and Borland, and features drums by Freese. Borland said that Patrick co-wrote the chorus to the Black Light Burns song "Lie", possibly hinting that at least the chorus was Damning Well material at one point.

== Songs ==
Song	Length	Soundtrack
"Awakening"	4:15	Underworld (2003)
"Power"	-	Unreleased

== Band members ==
- Richard Patrick – vocals
- Wes Borland – guitar
- Danny Lohner – bass
- Josh Freese – drums
