= Ready to Go (Limp Bizkit song) =

Single by Limp Bizkit featuring Lil Wayne
- Released: April 16, 2013
- Recorded: 2012
- Studio: The Hit Factory
- Genre: Nu metal; rap metal
- Length: 6:02
- Label: Cash Money
- Songwriters: Fred Durst; Wes Borland; Sam Rivers; John Otto; Lil Wayne; Paul Dawson; Jamal Jones
- Producer: Polow da Don

Limp Bizkit singles chronology
"Champions" (2013)	"Ready to Go" (2013)	"Thieves" (2013)

Lil Wayne singles chronology
"Rich As Fuck" (2013)	"Ready to Go" (2013)	"High School" (2013)

Music video
- "Ready to Go" on YouTube

"Ready to Go" is a song by the American rap rock band Limp Bizkit. The single features rapper and then label-mate Lil Wayne and is produced by Polow Da Don. The single is Limp Bizkit's first release for Cash Money Records after their departure from Interscope in 2011. The song was released in March 2013 as a free download on the band's website and, on April 16, as a digital single on iTunes and Amazon.

== Background ==
Limp Bizkit revealed plans to release "Ready to Go" in 2012 after they signed with Cash Money Records on February 24, with Fred Durst stating, "It sounds like a monster; it literally sounds dangerous. It sounds like that left of center, that place of discomfort that created rock 'n' roll, created the (heavy) metal, where it all spawned from."

Although being Limp Bizkit's first official single for Cash Money, another song called "Lightz (City of Angels)" was leaked to the masses in October 2012 via YouTube.

== Music and lyrics ==
According to Billboard, "In some ways, 'Ready To Go' is the type of song Limp Bizkit fans have been waiting on for over a decade, as a return to the chest-thumping shout-rap and heavy curtains of guitar. Before its bizarrely lengthy outro, the single lets frontman Fred Durst and Lil Wayne get their macho on". It has also been described as "gnarled nu-metal with all the poise of a rhinoceros in a tutu" by Fact Magazine. At HipHopDX, the song was characterized as "[bringing] their brand of Rap Metal back to the forefront."

Durst's lyrics describe his view of the rock scene as it exists today, and also takes digs at female celebrities Lady Gaga, Britney Spears (with whom Durst was rumored to be in a relationship with) and Jessica Biel. Lil Wayne's contribution begins after approximately 2 minutes and ends with him rapping the song's hook with Durst. An instrumental "outro" track concludes the song.

It was revealed through the band's Facebook page that a music video for the "urban assault" version of "Ready to Go" is under production. However, the music video ended up using the original version of the song.

== Reception ==
Professional ratings
Review scores
Source	Rating
VH1	7/10

"Ready to Go" has been met with positive reviews since its release. Spencer Kaufman of Loudwire praised Wes Borland's guitar playing and wrote, "The scorching track features blistering guitar work from Wes Borland".

== Music video ==
The music video was released on July 22, 2013, and was directed by Fred Durst. Contrary to early reports that the music video was being filmed for the "Urban Assault" version of the song, the video features the single's original track.

According to Loudwire:

The music video...takes fans behind the scenes of all things Limp Bizkit. The scenes change from shots of the band formulating set lists to guitarist Wes Borland's unique preparation for the stage. It's all intertwined with live concert clips of Limp Bizkit performing before thousands of fans.

Other famous personalities who appear in the video include guest vocalist Lil Wayne, Cash Money founders Bryan "Birdman" Williams and Ronald "Slim" Williams and DJ Stevie J.

== Personnel ==
Limp Bizkit

- Wes Borland – guitars
- Fred Durst – vocals
- John Otto – drums
- Sam Rivers – bass guitar

Additional musicians

- Lil Wayne – guest vocals

Production

- Polow da Don – producer
- Wes Borland – cover art design, art direction, illustration

Recording staff

- Ed Lidow – engineer
- Ward Kuykendall – assistant engineer
- Alex Dilliplane – assistant engineer

== Charts ==
Chart (2013)	Peak position
Denmark (Tracklisten)	25
Finland (Suomen virallinen lista)	23
Ireland (IRMA)	28
Spain (Promusicae)	26
UK Rock (Official Charts Company)	15
US Rock Songs (Billboard)	41
