= The Disconnection =

Studio album by Carina Round
- Released: October 13, 2003
- Genre: Alternative rock
- Length: 43:12
- Label: Interscope
- Producers: John Large; Tom Livemore; Gavin Monaghan; Carina Round

Carina Round chronology
The First Blood Mystery (2001)	The Disconnection (2003)	Slow Motion Addict (2006)

International edition cover

Professional ratings
Review scores
Source	Rating
AllMusic	4.5/5 stars
Blender	3/5 stars
The Guardian	4/5 stars
musicOMH	(positive)
PopMatters	(mixed)
Robert Christgau	(*)
Slant	4.5/5 stars

The Disconnection is the second album by Carina Round. It was released in October 2003. The album was released in the UK with a cover shot by Anoushka Fisz (wife of Dave Stewart from Eurythmics who supported her since), then released in 2004 with a different, less disturbing cover photo, on Interscope Records in the US. The album garnered comparisons to Björk, Jeff Buckley and Robert Plant.

== Track listing ==
All songs written by Carina Round, except where noted.

1. "Shoot" — 4:46
2. "Into My Blood" — 3:54
3. "Lacuna" — 4:14
4. "Paris" — 3:41
5. "Monument" — 4:40
6. "Motel 74" — 4:56
7. "Overcome" — 4:21
8. "Sit Tight" — 6:32
9. "Elegy" — 5:55 (Carina Round, Gavin Monaghan) (note, the UK version of the album has an acoustic version of this song (running 4:54) whilst the US version has an electric version)

== Personnel ==
Musicians

- Tom Livemore — fancy electric guitars and emma's harmonium, piano, tape delay and mandolin
- Carina Round — acoustic guitar, electric guitar, piano, rhodes, metal tray, mandolin and voices
- Simon Jason Smith — electric bass and double bass, portamento and electric guitar
- John Large — all drums, various percussion and gravel in a box, except Sit Tight, drums and percussion played by Marcus Galley

Additional Musicians

- Craig Hamilton — lush backing vocals on "Motel 74"
- Anna Russell — lush backing vocals on "Motel 74"
- Jim Summerfield — lush backing vocals on "Motel 74"
- Pippa Green — violin on "Overcome"
- Charley Miles — violin on "Overcome"
- Caroline Bodimead — violin on "Overcome"
- Louis Robinson — violin on "Overcome"
- Ellen Brookes — viola on "Overcome"
- Bruce Wilson — viola on "Overcome"
- Liz Tollington — cello on "Overcome"
- Clare Spencer-smith — cello on "Overcome"
- Nathan Loughran — backing voice on "Sit Tight"
- Matt Taylor — clarinet, horns on "Elegy"
- Ray Butcher — trumpet on "Elegy"
- Tom Walter — trombone on "Elegy"
- Joey Walter — sax on "Elegy"

Production

- Produced by Gavin Monaghan and Carina Round
- Pro-Tools Engineered and Recorded by Andy Taylor
- "Sit Tight" produced by Carina Round
- Recorded at Magic Garden Studios except "Sit Tight"
- "Sit Tight" recorded at The Church by Graham Domny and engineered by Nathan Loughran
- Mixed at The Thought Ranch by Tome Livemore and Carina Round except tracks 4, 6, 8 and 9
- Tracks 4, 6, 8 and 9 mixed at Eastcote Studios by Gavin Monaghan
- Mastered at Loud by John Dent

String Arrangement for "Overcome" by John Cotton

== Release history ==
Region	Date	Format	Label
United Kingdom	October 13, 2003	CD	Dehisce Records
United States	March 9, 2004	CD	Interscope Records
