= Big Dumb Face =

American metal band

- Origin: United States
- Genres: Grindcore; death metal; comedy metal
- Years active: 1998–2004, 2017–present
- Labels: Edison Sound, Flip, Interscope, Flawless
- Spinoff of: Limp Bizkit
- Members: Wes Borland; Scott Borland

Big Dumb Face is an American metal musical project noted for its comedic lyrics and style shifts, encompassing multiple genres of music, including grindcore, death metal, funk, country, disco, reggae, psychedelia and pop.

Big Dumb Face was formed by brothers Wes and Scott Borland in 1998, serving for the former as a side project of the American band Limp Bizkit. Big Dumb Face released its debut album, Duke Lion Fights the Terror!! in 2001, followed by a second album, Where Is Duke Lion? He's Dead... in 2017.

== History ==
=== Formation and Duke Lion Fights the Terror!! (1998-2004) ===
In 1998, Wes and Scott Borland formed Big Dumb Face, serving for Wes Borland as a side project of Limp Bizkit. In 2001, Big Dumb Face released its debut album, Duke Lion Fights the Terror!!, through Flip/Interscope and Flawless Records, a vanity label formed as a Geffen subsidiary by Limp Bizkit frontman Fred Durst, who is credited as an executive producer on the album.

Reviews were mixed. Allmusic writer Kieran McCarthy dismissed Duke Lion Fights the Terror as "a mediocre Ween rip-off" while Entertainment Weekly writer Robert Cherry wrote, "Dumb? Check. Big? Not likely." However, a positive review appeared in the Deseret News in which writer Scott Iwasaki, giving the album three stars, stated, "Duke Lion Fights the Terror!! captures Borland, as Big Dumb Face, at his most spontaneous". Bloody Good Horror writer D.M, in a mixed to favorable review, wrote, "The album's concept is so scattershot that it's unfathomable to call the album a cohesive whole."

After the release of the band's debut album, Wes Borland began developing a video game sequel to the album, which fell through. Big Dumb Face was sporadically active until 2004.

=== Where Is Duke Lion? He's Dead... (2017) ===
Big Dumb Face was inactive for 13 years while Wes Borland was active with other projects, most notably Black Light Burns, rejoining Limp Bizkit, and becoming the touring guitarist for Queen Kwong.

In June 2017, Borland hinted on Instagram that he would revive Big Dumb Face. On October 13, a new Big Dumb Face song, "He Rides The Skies", was released.

The band's second album, Where Is Duke Lion? He's Dead... was released on October 31 through Borland's own label Edison Sound. The album consists of newly written songs alongside one song written in 2001 and another written in 2003. Borland described it as "the most metal record I've ever made".

=== Christmas in the Cave of Dagoth (2021) ===
In March 2018, Borland stated that he was working on a Christmas album, intended for release on Black Friday 2018. The album, Christmas in the Cave of Dagoth, did not get released until December 11, 2021.

== Style and influences ==
Wes Borland cited the music of Ween and Mr. Bungle as an influence on Big Dumb Face's music. Wes Borland stated that the band's music is "really silly and idiotic and bizarre. [...] It's nothing but stupid [...] just all these retarded songs."

Metal Hammer referred to the band's music as "death country". NME describes the band's music as encompassing "death metal, electronic noise, steel pan samples and grindcore". Allmusic describes the band's music as ranging from "Dr. Demento-esque variety-show pop to alternative country à la Ween." Blabbermouth described the band's song "Whipping the Hodeus" as combining "grotesque southern country, [...] cinematic rural soundscape, disco funk, and finally, grind/deathcore."

Bloody Good Horror described the band's music as comedy metal, and New Noise magazine described the band's music as "joke metal", stating, "one minute it's grindcore and the next it's reggae. The genre changes are ripe with humor-inducing irony", citing, as an example, the song "The Blood Maiden", which "uses joyfully upbeat Jamaican steel drums to contrast the lyrics about summoning a demon." Deseret News writer Scott Iwasaki described the band's music as "riotous meanderings that tap into early grindcore grooves and Captain Beefheart psychedelia".

== Band members ==
Current members

- Wes Borland - vocals, guitar, bass, drums, programming (1998–2004, 2017–present)
- Scott Borland - keyboards, vocals, guitar, bass (1998–2004, 2017–present)

Former members

- Kyle Weeks - vocals, sampling (1998–2004)
- Greg Isabelle - drums, vocals (1998–2004)

Touring members

- Chris Gibbs - bass (2001)

== Discography ==
- Duke Lion Fights the Terror!! (2001)
- Where Is Duke Lion? He's Dead... (2017)
- Christmas in the Cave of Dagoth (2021)
