= Queen Kwong =

American indie rock band

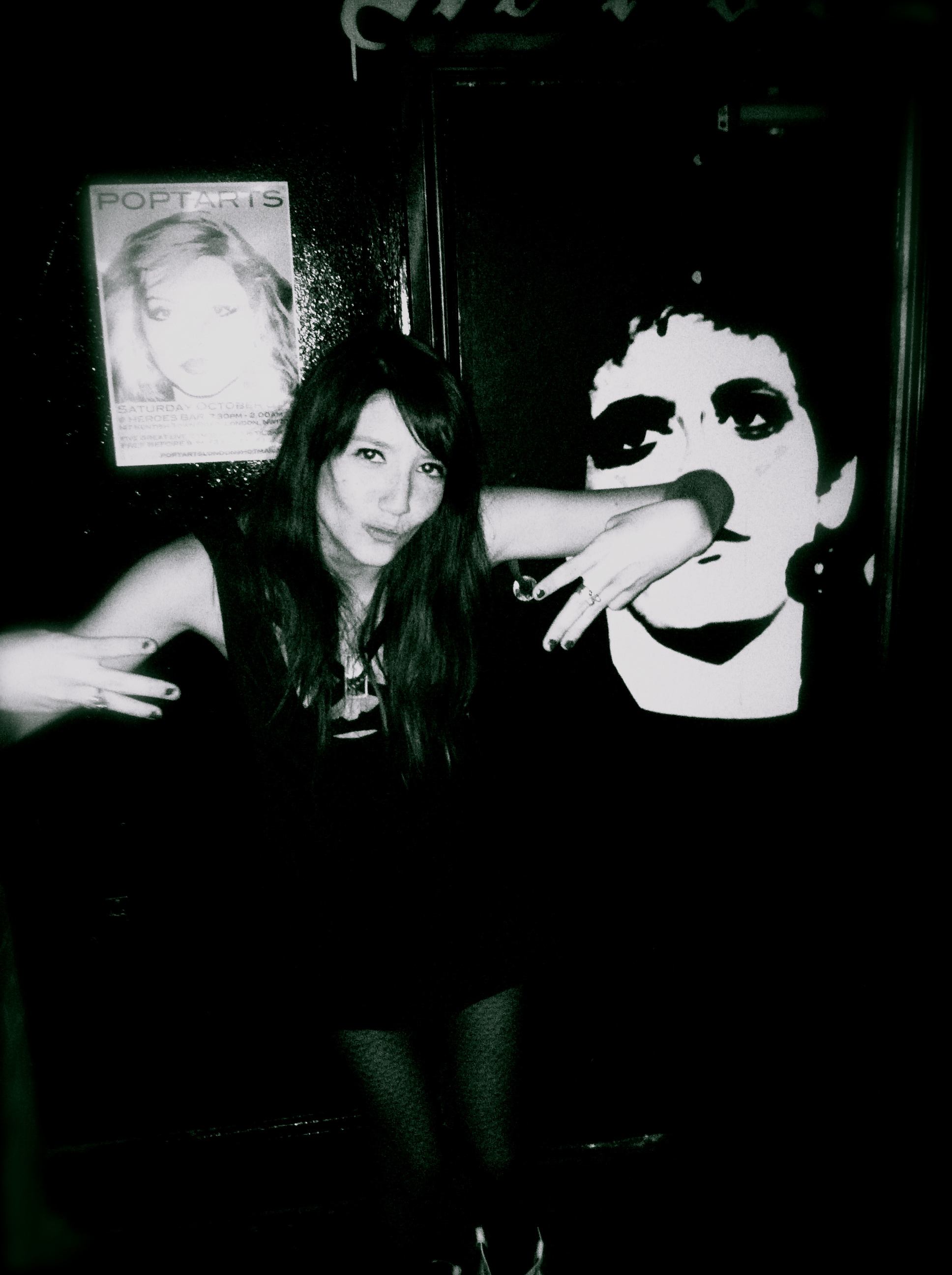
- Carré Kwong Callaway, aka Queen Kwong, in London

Background information
- Origin: Los Angeles, California, United States
- Genres: Rock, alternative
- Years active: 2009–present
- Labels: Edison Sound, Smoky Carrot, Instant Records, Dissention Records, Sonic Ritual
- Members: Carré Kwong Callaway
- Website: www.queenkwong.com

Queen Kwong is an American indie rock band founded in Los Angeles, California. The band was founded by multi-instrumentalist Carré Kwong Callaway, the band's sole singer and songwriter who was discovered at age 17 by Trent Reznor of Nine Inch Nails.

== History ==
Carré Callaway was discovered by Trent Reznor in his New Orleans studio. She first gained notoriety when she opened for Nine Inch Nails on the 2005 With Teeth tour. At this time she was performing solo as a singer/songwriter and soon after moved to Los Angeles under the guidance of Trent Reznor. Callaway dropped out of the music scene for a couple of years and then reemerged in 2009 as Queen Kwong. She supported Nine Inch Nails in 2009 for the Nine Inch Nails "Wave Goodbye" tour and again in 2018.

Carré released her debut LP, "Get a Witness", September 2015 to critical acclaim. She described it as a stream of consciousness record, recorded in one to two takes while improvising everything. The 1st Five said, "This album is harsh, confrontational, noisy, dreamy, calming and jarring. It’s doing exactly what great music should do: stir you down to the core and depths of your heart and leave you a shallow husk of mixed emotions begging for more." Kerrang magazine named the title track one of the top 10 songs of 2016. and listed it as one of Kerrang!'s Top 50 Records of 2015. The album was regularly played on BBC Radio 1.

In support of the record, Carré toured extensively in the UK and Europe playing festivals like Reading and Leeds Festivals.

In April 2016, Queen Kwong's version of the Chris Isaak song "Baby Did a Bad Bad Thing" off of her EP, "Bad Lieutenant", was used in the hit BBC TV show Peaky Blinders (TV series)

On April 13, 2018, Queen Kwong's sophomore record, "Love Me To Death" and tour dates were announced. The record received positive reviews, noting Callaway's ability to defy genres. Kerrang Magazine called the record "a study in dualities, at once confrontational and vulnerable, tender and brutal, with gossamer-fine melodies set against grinding synths and scarring punk guitars. It’s an immersive, eclectic, largely improvised set that repays repeated listening." The Independent said this of the record, "Love Me To Death has the same dangerous energy as Callaway’s debut; squalling, distorted guitars, snatches of muttered conversation in the background, sheer screams, ghostly chimes, menacing drum beats… but it’s much more refined. There’s an explicit message in each song...It’s just as brave and bold a statement."

In July 2022, Queen Kwong released her third LP, "Couples Only" followed by a music video starring Johnny Knoxville for the track "Sad Man."

In July 2024, Callaway revealed she had auditioned to be the new guitarist for The Smashing Pumpkins. Out of 10,000 contenders, she made it to the final eight but ultimately, Kiki Wong was hired.

== Personal life ==
In October 2016 Callaway married Limp Bizkit guitarist Wes Borland. The couple resided together in Detroit, where they starred in the TV series, Sight Unseen, about renovating their historic home.

In April 2018, Callaway released a statement confirming that she had been diagnosed with cystic fibrosis.

Callaway filed for divorce from Borland in 2019. In January 2023, Borland filed a defamation lawsuit against Callaway for statements Callaway made during an interview. In March 2023, it was announced that Borland’s lawsuit had been dismissed by a Detroit judge.

In 2025, Callaway announced on Lo Carmen's podcast, Death Is Not the End, that she had moved to London and was training to be a death doula while recording the new Queen Kwong record.

== Discography ==
- 2013: Bad Lieutenant (EP)
- 2015: Get a Witness (LP)
- 2018: Love Me to Death (LP)
- 2019: Oh Well (EP)
- 2022: Couples Only (LP)
- 2024: STRANGERS (EP)
