= Black Light Burns =

American rock band

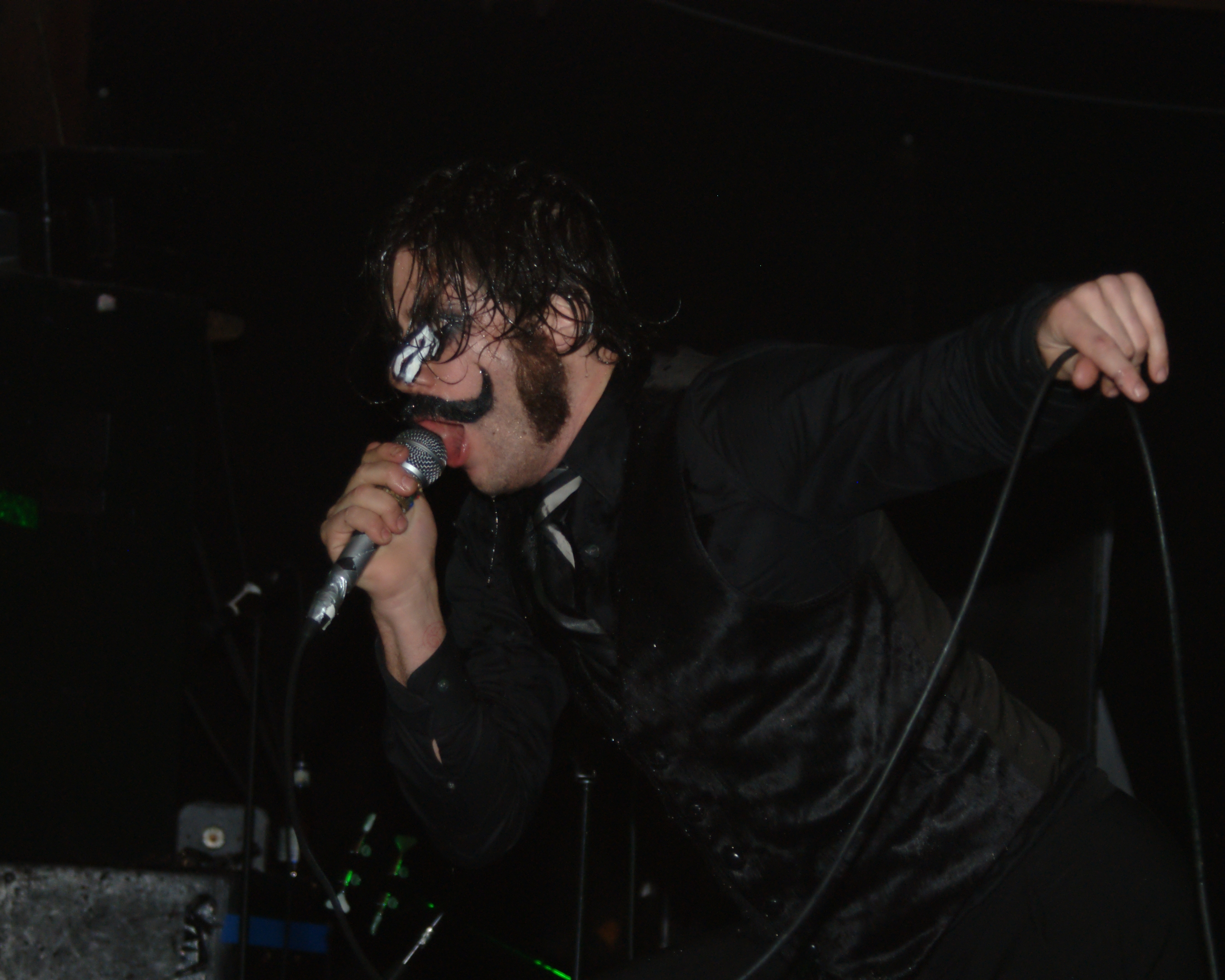
- Wes Borland, performing with Black Light Burns in Atlanta, GA, 2009

Background information
- Origin: Los Angeles, California, U.S.
- Genres: Industrial rock; alternative rock
- Years active: 2005–2016
- Labels: I AM: WOLFPACK, Rocket Science Ventures, THC : Music, RED, Membran
- Past members: Wes Borland; Nick Annis; Danny Lohner; Josh Freese; Josh Eustis; Sean Fetterman; Marshall Kilpatric; Joe Letz; Dennis Sanders; Dylan Taylor

Black Light Burns was an American industrial rock band fronted by Wes Borland. Founded in 2005 after Borland departed Limp Bizkit, the band's lineup also includes Nick Annis, Dennis Sanders and Dylan Taylor. Their debut album, Cruel Melody, was released in June 2007 to critical acclaim. They released a covers and b-sides CD/DVD combo package in the summer of 2008 titled Cover Your Heart and the Anvil Pants Odyssey. After a temporary hiatus, the band regrouped in 2012 and released their second album, The Moment You Realize You're Going to Fall in August. The band released a concept album, Lotus Island, in January 2013.

== History ==
=== Early years and formation (2001–2005) ===
After achieving mainstream success and popularity with Limp Bizkit, Wes Borland quit the band in 2001. He was already a member of Big Dumb Face, a project he had been working on with his brother Scott, during his time with Limp Bizkit. He set it aside after his departure from Limp Bizkit and began working on several different projects, the first of which was supposed to be an instrumental album one could listen to and simply relax. Simultaneously, he began Eat The Day, with Scott Borland. Eat The Day eventually unraveled itself, as, in Borland's words, "I think everybody involved in that project had different ideas about the direction that it should go". Borland became self-absorbed, and along with continuous pressure from the label, and struggles finding a lead singer for the band, the project eventually disbanded.

After the failure of another project, The Damning Well, in 2003, Borland began writing a solo record with its members Danny Lohner and Josh Freese, with Josh Eustis and John Bates contributing. This solo record was the beginning of Black Light Burns, and stylistically at the time, it was more of a mellow, relaxing, and esoteric outing. Borland returned to Limp Bizkit once again in late summer of 2004, turning down the spots as touring guitar player in A Perfect Circle and Nine Inch Nails.

Following the release of Limp Bizkit's The Unquestionable Truth (Part 1) in 2005, arguments broke out on MySpace between Borland and frontman Fred Durst, and Borland left Limp Bizkit once again. According to him, the band members had already gone their separate ways, and he simply decided not to return. Borland stated that Black Light Burns was now his main project, and anything else he did, including Limp Bizkit, was a side project. By this time, Borland had written significantly heavier material for Black Light Burns alongside the softer material, and Black Light Burns had evolved into a full out band as opposed to a softer solo effort. Eventually, John Bates' contribution on vocals was removed as Borland discovered his identity as a vocalist.

=== Cruel Melody (2006–2007) ===
Black Light Burns' first tour was previously set to begin in fall of 2006 with From First to Last, who Borland also plays bass for on and off. This tour was to feature Borland doing double duty as the singer/guitarist for Black Light Burns and then bassist for From First to Last afterwards. However, Sonny Moore (vocalist of From First to Last) developed a node on his right vocal cord needing surgery, thus ending Wes Borland's touring stint with From First to Last.

Borland was offered the touring guitarist spot in Nine Inch Nails, and frontman Trent Reznor offered his opinions on the material as it was at the time. He encouraged Borland to "not sing like someone was asleep in the next room" and make it a heavier affair, which had coincidentally already been the direction Borland had been developing it in. While the songs were written by Borland, he did have additional input from producer Danny Lohner, percussion by Josh Freese, and keyboards and additional engineering work done by Josh Eustis. After years of working on it when all the participants had free time from their projects, Black Light Burns released their debut album, Cruel Melody in the spring of 2007. In its first week of release Cruel Melody sold 6,000 copies in the US according to Indiehq.com.

Borland stated that he is the only constant in Black Light Burns, as the other members of the studio lineup are expected to be mostly unable to participate in touring with Black Light Burns, such as the notoriously busy Josh Freese. The initial touring lineup of Black Light Burns was Wes Borland (vocals, guitar), Marshall Kilpatric (drums; previously in The Esoteric), Nick Annis (guitar; previously in Open Hand, Turn of the Screw), Sean Fetterman (bass; previously in Turn of the Screw).

The song "Lie" served as the first single from the album, going to radio on March 20. A music video was released soon after this. The instrumental for the song "I Have a Need" had originally been written to be included on the Limp Bizkit release The Unquestionable Truth (Part 1), but was cut in order for the EP to remain mostly metal oriented. It features Limp Bizkit's bassist Sam Rivers on the track, and Borland was allowed to use the song for Black Light Burns when the song was turned down for use by Limp Bizkit. The tracks "4 Walls", "Animal" and "The Mark" are used in Season 2 of TV series Burn Notice. The track "Stop a Bullet" is used in the launch trailer for the videogame Ghost Recon: Future Soldier. An instrumental version of "Coward" is used in the film Underworld during the scene where Michael begins to change into a Lycan in the back of a cop car. It was not, however, featured on the film's official soundtrack.

Borland announced touring dates for May 2007 opening for Chevelle in April. While staying in Texas for a show, Chevelle was robbed of their equipment and canceled all tour dates for that week. Black Light Burns was unsatisfied with not playing for this time and played a few shows to test the waters of their upcoming headlining tour.

On July 13, 2007, Black Light Burns was featured on the late night talk show Last Call with Carson Daly where they performed "Lie."

=== Cover Your Heart and the Anvil Pants Odyssey and hiatus (2008–2011) ===
In late 2007–early 2008, after a scheduled break from touring for their label to secure an overseas release of Cruel Melody, Black Light Burns released Cover Your Heart and the Anvil Pants Odyssey in spring 2008. This release contains both a cover album, Cover Your Heart, which includes b-sides and remixes of songs from Cruel Melody, and a DVD, named The Anvil Pants Odyssey, containing live and behind the scenes footage of the band. The covers on the album comprise songs by artists such as PJ Harvey, The Jesus Lizard, Love and Rockets, Swans, Fiona Apple, Lard, and Borland's former side project Big Dumb Face. A cover of "Devil Inside" by INXS was originally intended to appear on this album as well, but was removed at some point.

On March 30, 2008, Borland made a post on the band's MySpace about how he filled in for the band X Japan and was "looking forward to coming home and getting back to work on the next BLB album", by which he means the second full length Black Light Burns album, due to the fact that their cover song album was already complete by that point.

On December 16, 2008 Wes Borland made a post on the band's MySpace blog that confirmed they would appear on the soundtrack for the film Underworld: Rise of the Lycans. They contributed the track "I Want You To", which is taken off their forthcoming record. The song is available on their official MySpace page. This was not the first time Borland's work appeared on an Underworld series soundtrack; his previous band, The Damning Well, appeared on the Underworld soundtrack and much of Cruel Melody is believed to be taken from that project.

Black Light Burns began touring with Combichrist in December 2008, and included two new songs in their set. One is "I Want You To" and the other is titled "How To Look Naked". On the last night of Black Light Burns' tour with Combichrist (before Borland began new commitments to a regrouped Limp Bizkit) the band played two new songs, "We Light Up" and "Your Head Will be Rotting on a Spike".

Black Light Burns entered a temporary hiatus due to Limp Bizkit's reunion. Wes Borland rejoined Limp Bizkit in early 2009 and the band would go on to release a new album Gold Cobra in 2011. Borland has stated many times on Myspace and Twitter that a second record was completed and currently put on the backburner until he found a label willing to release it.

=== The Moment You Realize You're Going To Fall and Lotus Island (2012–present) ===
In early 2012, Black Light Burns was featured on the soundtrack to Underworld: Awakening, with their contribution, "It Rapes All In Its Path".

On February 4, 2012, Wes Borland announced a new album titled The Moment You Realize You're Going to Fall for a September–October 2012 release. On February 22, 2012, they signed a record deal with Rocket Science Ventures/THC : Music/RED and plan to release it through the label. On June 1, 2012, the first single, "Scream Hallelujah", was released along with the track listing and an announced release date of August 14, 2012. On June 29, a second track was made available for free downloading through the band's official website, entitled "Splayed".

The album was released on August 14, 2012, to critical acclaim. Sputnikmusic awarded it a score of 4/5, stating, "The Moment You Realize You're Going to Fall is an incredibly refreshing record that solidifies Wes Borland and the rest of Black Light Burns as musicians to keep an eye on."

It was reported that the band would release three different videos marked as chapters in order to promote the release of the album. The first chapter is a trailer video directed by Agata Alexander, that contains an edited version of the title track. It has also been revealed through the band's Facebook account that a video for the single "How to Look Naked" was being filmed and it was released September 14, 2012, on Vimeo.

The band toured both the USA and Europe throughout 2012 and 2013 to support the album.

==== Lotus Island ====
The band released a concept album, titled Lotus Island, on January 21, 2013. It also served as an alternate soundtrack to the 1973 film The Holy Mountain by Alejandro Jodorowsky. The album consists of seven instrumental tracks, four full band completed songs with vocals, and a remastered and remixed version of "It Rapes All in Its Path". The album has a running time of 40 minutes and was mixed entirely by Borland, his first attempt at mixing a full album. According to Wes Borland, the album is more of a "thing". Borland considers Lotus Island to be neither a true album nor an EP, but an "interim piece". In 2016, Borland said that he would never record another Black Light Burns album. However, in October 2017 he stated that after his current commitments with Big Dumb Face, Queen Kwong and his next solo album, he aimed to release a new Black Light Burns album in June 2018, which he stated is "because [he] said [he'd] never do that again". In November 2024, Borland revealed that Black Light Burns was inactive due to a shift in his mindset following his marriage. He explained that because he was no longer channelling anger or frustration and was "happy all the time now," he found himself unable to write lyrics for the side project.

== Members ==
=== Current members ===
- Wes Borland – guitar, lead vocals, bass, keyboards, synthesizers, programming, occasional drums (2005–2016, occasional 2016–2024)
- Danny Lohner – rhythm guitar, bass, programming, sound design, producer (2005–2007)
- Josh Eustis – keyboards, synthesizers, sound design, engineering (2005–2007)
- Josh Freese – drums, percussion (2005–2007)
- Sean Fetterman – bass (2007–2008)
- Marshall Kilpatric – drums, percussion (2007–2011)
- Joe Letz – drums (2012), never actually played with the band due to "scheduling conflicts"
- Dylan Taylor – drums (2012–2013)
- Nick Annis – rhythm guitar, backing vocals (2007–2016)
- Dennis Sanders – bass, backing vocals (2008–2016)

== Discography ==
=== Studio albums ===
Year	Album Details	Peak chart positions						
Year	Album Details	US	US Heat	US Indie	AUS	CAN	NZ	UK
2007	Cruel Melody: Released: June 5, 2007; Label: I AM: WOLFPACK; Formats: CD, DI	33	2	14	25	20	17	71
2012	The Moment You Realize You're Going to Fall: Released: August 13, 2012; Label: Rocket Science, THC:Music; Formats: CD, DI, 2x LP	31	20	17	21	27	20	73
2013	Lotus Island: Released: January 21, 2013; Label: I AM: WOLFPACK; Formats: CD, DI	-	-	-	-	-	-	-

=== Compilation albums ===
Year	Album details
2008	Cover Your Heart and the Anvil Pants Odyssey: Released: August 5, 2008; Label: I AM: WOLFPACK; Formats: CD, DI, DVD

=== Box sets ===
Year	Album details
2008	Order of the Black Light: Handbook for Members vol. 1: Label: Self-released; Formats: CD, DI, DVD

=== Singles ===
Title	Year	Peak chart positions		Album
Title	Year	US Main. Rock	US Rock	Album
"Lie"	2007	22	34	Cruel Melody
"Mesopotamia"	2007	—	—	Cruel Melody
"4 Walls"	2007	—	38	Cruel Melody
"I Have a Need"	2008	—	—	Cruel Melody
"I Want You To"	2009	—	41	Underworld: Rise of the Lycans (Official Soundtrack)
"It Rapes All in Its Path"	2012	—	39	Underworld: Awakening (Official Soundtrack)
"The Moment You Realize You're Going to Fall"	2012	—	—	The Moment You Realize You're Going to Fall
"Scream Hallelujah"	2012	—	—	The Moment You Realize You're Going to Fall
"Splayed"	2012	—	—	The Moment You Realize You're Going to Fall
"How to Look Naked"	2013	—	44	The Moment You Realize You're Going to Fall
"—" denotes a recording that did not chart or was not released in that territory.

=== Music videos ===
Year	Song	Director(s)
2007	"Lie"	Josh Evans
2007	"4 Walls"	Wes Borland
2008	"Mesopotamia"	Satchel Underwood
2012	"The Moment You Realize You're Going to Fall"	Agata Alexander
2013	"How to Look Naked"	Agata Alexander
