= Wes Borland =

American guitarist and vocalist (born 1975)

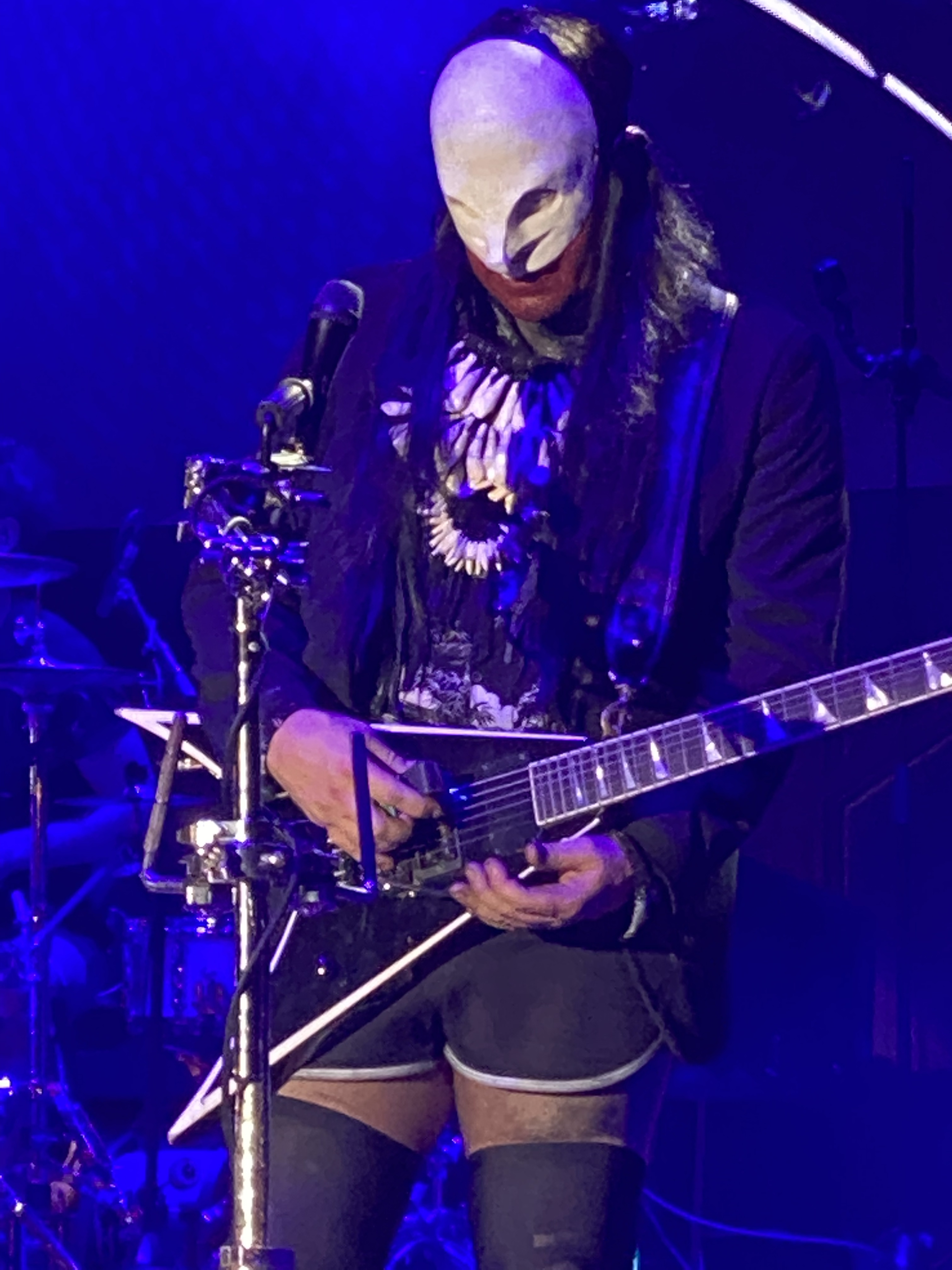
- Borland performing with Limp Bizkit in 2021

Background information
- Born: Wesley Louden Borland; February 7, 1975 (age 51); Richmond, Virginia, U.S.
- Origin: Jacksonville, Florida, U.S.
- Genres: Nu metal; rap metal; alternative rock; rap rock; industrial rock; extreme metal
- Occupations: Musician, singer, songwriter
- Instruments: Guitar; bass; vocals
- Years active: 1992–present
- Member of: Limp Bizkit; Big Dumb Face; Goatslayer
- Formerly of: Black Light Burns; The Damning Well; Eat the Day; From First to Last

Wesley Louden Borland (born February 7, 1975) is an American rock musician, singer, and songwriter. He is the guitarist and backing vocalist of the nu metal band Limp Bizkit, the lead vocalist and guitarist of the alternative and industrial rock band Black Light Burns, and the co-founder of the experimental metal band Big Dumb Face.

Borland gained popularity when Limp Bizkit achieved mainstream success in the late 1990s and early 2000s. He formed Big Dumb Face with his brother Scott in 1998 and left Limp Bizkit in 2001 to start side projects including Eat the Day and The Damning Well. After rejoining Limp Bizkit in 2004, Borland founded Black Light Burns, with whom he has released three studio albums and a covers album. Limp Bizkit went on hiatus following the release of their album The Unquestionable Truth (Part 1) (2005). However, the band's original lineup reunited in 2009 and recorded their fifth studio album, Gold Cobra (2011). In 2016, Borland released his solo album Crystal Machete.

Borland is known for his sonic experimentation and elaborate visual appearance, which has included face and body paint, masks and uniforms. He has drawn album covers and created artwork for many of his music projects as well as oil paintings. Borland was voted number 37 in Total Guitar's Top 100 Guitarists of All Time. Borland formed the label Edison Sound, which releases his own music projects.

== Career ==
=== Limp Bizkit and mainstream success (1994–2002) ===
Borland joined Limp Bizkit, a band formed by Fred Durst, Sam Rivers and John Otto. Limp Bizkit developed a cult following in the underground music scene, particularly at the Milk Bar, an underground punk club in downtown Jacksonville, Florida. The band attracted crowds by word of mouth and covering George Michael's "Faith" and Paula Abdul's "Straight Up"; the band also gave energetic live performances in which Borland appeared in bizarre costumes. Borland's theatrical rock style was the primary attraction for many concert attendees. After DJ Lethal joined the band as a turntablist, Borland left Limp Bizkit after a disagreement with Durst. However, Borland rejoined after the band signed with Mojo, a subsidiary of MCA Records. After a dispute with Mojo, Limp Bizkit signed with Flip, a subsidiary of Interscope Records, and recorded their debut, Three Dollar Bill, Yall, which featured an abrasive, angry sound.

Although the album was met with minimal response, touring consistently increased Limp Bizkit's success, and the third single from Three Dollar Bill, Yall, "Faith", became a radio hit, leading to a slot on Ozzfest, a tour organized by Ozzy and Sharon Osbourne. In 1998, Borland formed a side project, Big Dumb Face with his brother, influenced by Ween and Mr. Bungle.

Significant Other saw Limp Bizkit reaching a new level of commercial success. The album climbed to No. 1 on the Billboard 200, selling 643,874 copies in its first week of release. In 2000, Durst announced that the band's third studio album would be titled Chocolate Starfish and the Hot Dog Flavored Water. The press thought that Durst was joking about this title. The album title is intended to sound like a fictional band; the phrase "Chocolate Starfish" referred to Durst himself, as he had frequently been called an asshole. Borland contributed the other half of the album's title when the band was standing around at a truck stop, looking at bottles of flavored water, and Borland joked that the truck stop didn't have hot dog or meat-flavored water. It debuted at number one on the Billboard 200, selling 1.05 million copies in its first week, and was the 18th best-selling album of the 2000s in the US.

In a 1999 Spin profile on Limp Bizkit, when asked "Where will you be ten years from now?", Borland responded, "Probably not in the band."

=== Departure from Limp Bizkit, side-projects, brief return to Limp Bizkit, and Black Light Burns formation (2002–2009) ===
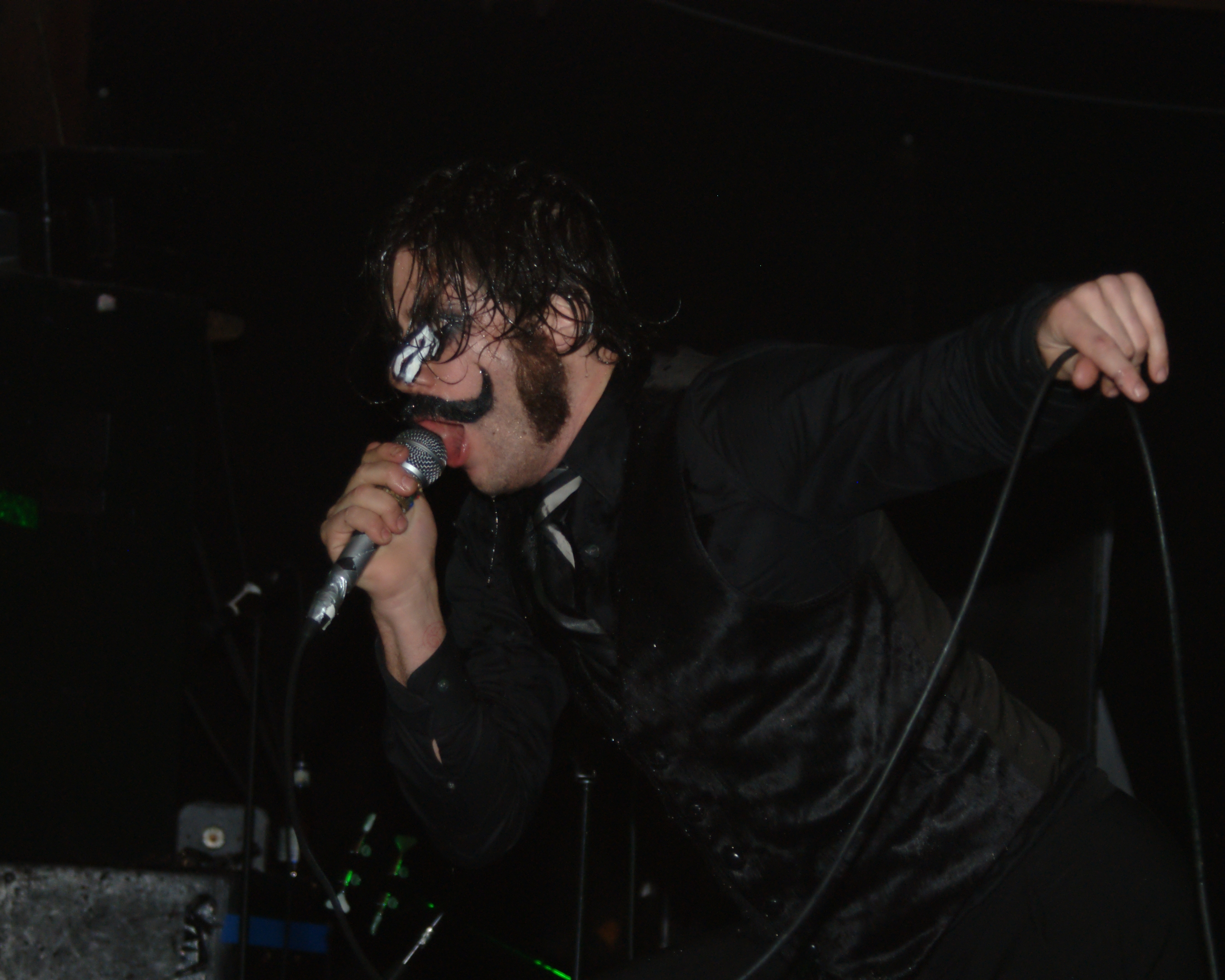
Borland as the frontman for Black Light Burns in 2009

In March 2001, Big Dumb Face released its debut album, Duke Lion Fights the Terror!!. Borland stated that the band's music is "really silly and idiotic and bizarre. [...] It's nothing but stupid [...] just all these retarded songs." In the fall of 2001, Borland left Limp Bizkit, citing creative differences with the band. When asked why Borland quit the band, Ross Robinson stated that he quit because "He doesn't sell out for money anymore".

Borland then formed the band Eat the Day, in which he and his brother Scott would both act as co-lead vocalists. After realizing this setup restricted their guitar-playing abilities, Eat The Day launched an open search for a new vocalist. Initially, the band released three full-length instrumental tracks for hopeful singers to download and record over. The tracks were dAdA, Beeblicowcarapis and Taste My Gun, but later they were only available as small samples. In a 2021 interview, Borland claimed that he went through at least 150 audition recordings.

In January 2003, Borland announced former Stalking Tom singer Adam Yas as the new vocalist for Eat The Day, but two months later he reported that the band "...decided to go public with our search one more time" while still staying in contact with the previously announced Yas. Around the same time, Bob Ezrin was brought in to produce their debut album. Shortly afterward, Borland had found three potential singers for the project, with one presumably being the previously announced Adam Yas.

Despite his claims that the three discovered vocalists were the best options available, producer Ezrin didn't believe in their abilities enough to allow Eat The Day to move forward with the production of their album, going as far as calling the singers "terrible". In order to improve the situation, Borland attempted to bring in Danny Lohner, which resulted in further clashes with Ezrin and ground the project to a halt. Eat The Day was eventually abandoned due to being unable to find a vocalist. The unfinished demos from Eat the Day were subsequently released in April 2020 by Borland.

After the failure of another project, The Damning Well, in 2003, Borland began writing a solo record with its members Danny Lohner and Josh Freese, with Josh Eustis and Jonathan Bates contributing. This record served as the precursor to Black Light Burns. In August 2004, Borland rejoined Limp Bizkit and recorded another album, The Unquestionable Truth (Part 1) in 2005. Following the release of the band's Greatest Hitz album, the band went on hiatus after arguments broke out on MySpace between Borland and frontman Fred Durst, with Borland stating, "As of right now, none of my future plans include Limp Bizkit."

In 2005, Borland formed Black Light Burns. Borland stated that this was now his main project, and anything else he did, including Limp Bizkit, was a side project. Borland toured with From First To Last roughly since early 2006. He announced plans for a fall 2006 tour that never went through due to Black Light Burns needing to find a new record label after Borland left Geffen Records. Borland had discussed plans to write and perform on the next From First To Last album, but he left the band when Black Light Burns' busy schedule started to pick up, leaving no room to work with From First to Last.

Black Light Burns released its début album, Cruel Melody in the spring of 2007 to critical acclaim. It featured Borland on the vocals and guitars. Allmusic writer Greg Prato wrote, "For many, Borland was the only Limp Bizkit member who was taken seriously. As evidenced by Cruel Melody, he is now officially allowed to follow whichever musical path he so desires.". In 2008, Borland, along with Richard Fortus and Sugizo, supported Japanese metal band X Japan at their sold out reunion concerts at the Tokyo Dome.

In August 2008, at the ETP Conference, it was announced that Borland joined Marilyn Manson as a guitarist. In the winter of 2008, Borland helped in the recording of The Color of Violence's 2009 album Youthanize as a bassist.

=== Limp Bizkit reunion (2009) ===
In 2009, the original lineup of Limp Bizkit reunited and began touring, which resulted in a second Black Light Burns record being put on the backburner. Borland left Manson's employ in May of the same year, claiming his reasons for leaving included rejoining his old band and having creative differences with Manson, citing "It's the Marilyn Manson show over there." Limp Bizkit recorded a new album, which Borland named Gold Cobra. Released on June 28, 2011. It received mixed reviews, with multiple reviewers praising Borland's guitar playing. It peaked at No. 16 on the Billboard 200.

Borland also designed the album artwork for Fear and the Nervous System's 2011 eponymous debut album.

Borland has also gone onto a remixing career with his distribution of alternative versions of songs by metal bands. Most recently, The Word Alive has had their song "The Hounds of Anubis" remixed by Borland. He also played guitar in the soundtrack of Resident Evil: Afterlife by Tomandandy.

In 2012, Black Light Burns began performing after their brief hiatus and released their second studio album The Moment You Realize You're Going to Fall and a concept "album", Lotus Island, in January 2013. In the same year, during the Black Light Burns tour, Borland stated that he would never do a solo project. "If I would do a solo project I would put my name on the record. But that will never happen."

Borland collaborated with Riot Games to develop Hybrid Worlds, the theme song for the League of Legends Season 3 World Championships. Borland performed live for the event on October 4, 2013, along with The Crystal Method, Tina Guo, and Black Light Burns alumni Danny Lohner and Joe Letz.

=== Solo album, Big Dumb Face reunion, demos, and Still Sucks (2016–present) ===
On May 3, 2016, Borland released an instrumental solo album named Crystal Machete on his personal record label (Edison Sound), which saw him stepping outside his comfort zone by featuring no distorted guitars or vocals. The album was released to positive reviews, with Drowned in Sound calling the album "a beautiful, sprawling post-rock mini epic". In 2016 he disbanded Black Light Burns.

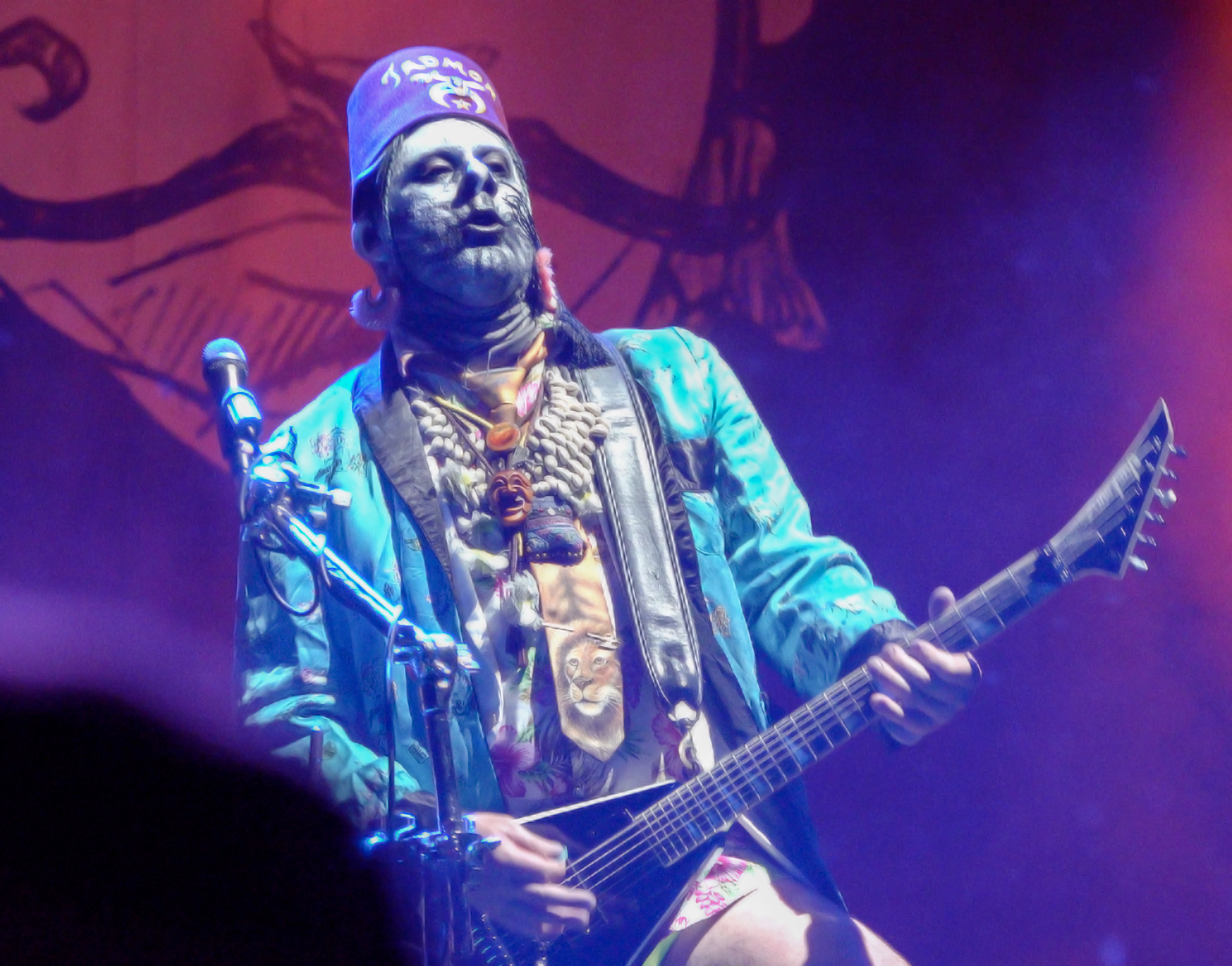
Borland performing with Limp Bizkit at Quebec Agora Fest 2019

In winter 2016 Limp Bizkit embarked on a co-headlining UK tour with Korn, including dates at Wembley Arena with support from Madball. As of October 2017, the status of the new Limp Bizkit album Stampede of the Disco Elephants is unknown, with Borland telling NME that he has completed all of his parts for "28 or 29 songs" and is waiting for Fred to choose what songs he wants to complete before he can mix and master it. He also blamed his time in Limp Bizkit for difficulty in getting jobs with other acts such as Nine Inch Nails and Marilyn Manson in the past, stating that the other bands didn't want to be associated with his previous band.

In June 2017 he posted on social media that Big Dumb Face will be returning that year, eventually confirming that the new album, Where Is Duke Lion? He's Dead... would be released on October 31 via Edison Sound, with a full scale physical release to follow on November 17. Explaining why he revived Big Dumb Face after 16 years, he said that he wanted to make something "really heavy" in contrast to the post-rock of Crystal Machete, and that he was currently "into making things that [he] said [he'd] never do again", such as the solo record, or reviving Black Light Burns to release a new album in June 2018. He did, however, say that he would not tour with Big Dumb Face as he has prior touring commitments with Limp Bizkit and his then-wife's band, Queen Kwong. In February 2018 Borland teased images of him working in the studio with Travis Barker on an "as yet untitled project". He also played guitar on five tracks from Jonathan Davis's debut solo album Black Labyrinth, which was recorded between 2007 and 2018.

In April 2020, during the COVID-19 pandemic, Borland began publicly releasing previously unheard material from Eat the Day and Goatslayer, an experimental project he had with brother Scott since the two were teenagers. Borland claimed that the latter project had 23 albums worth of material, the first of which, The Feather Serpent, was released on April 25. On December 5 Borland announced that he finished recording and mixing his second solo album The Astral Hand, which was released three days later.

On December 11, 2021, the third album by Big Dumb Face, Christmas in the Cave of Dagoth, was released.

In April 2022, Borland was recruited by Danny Elfman to perform with his band at Coachella Festival.

== Personal life ==
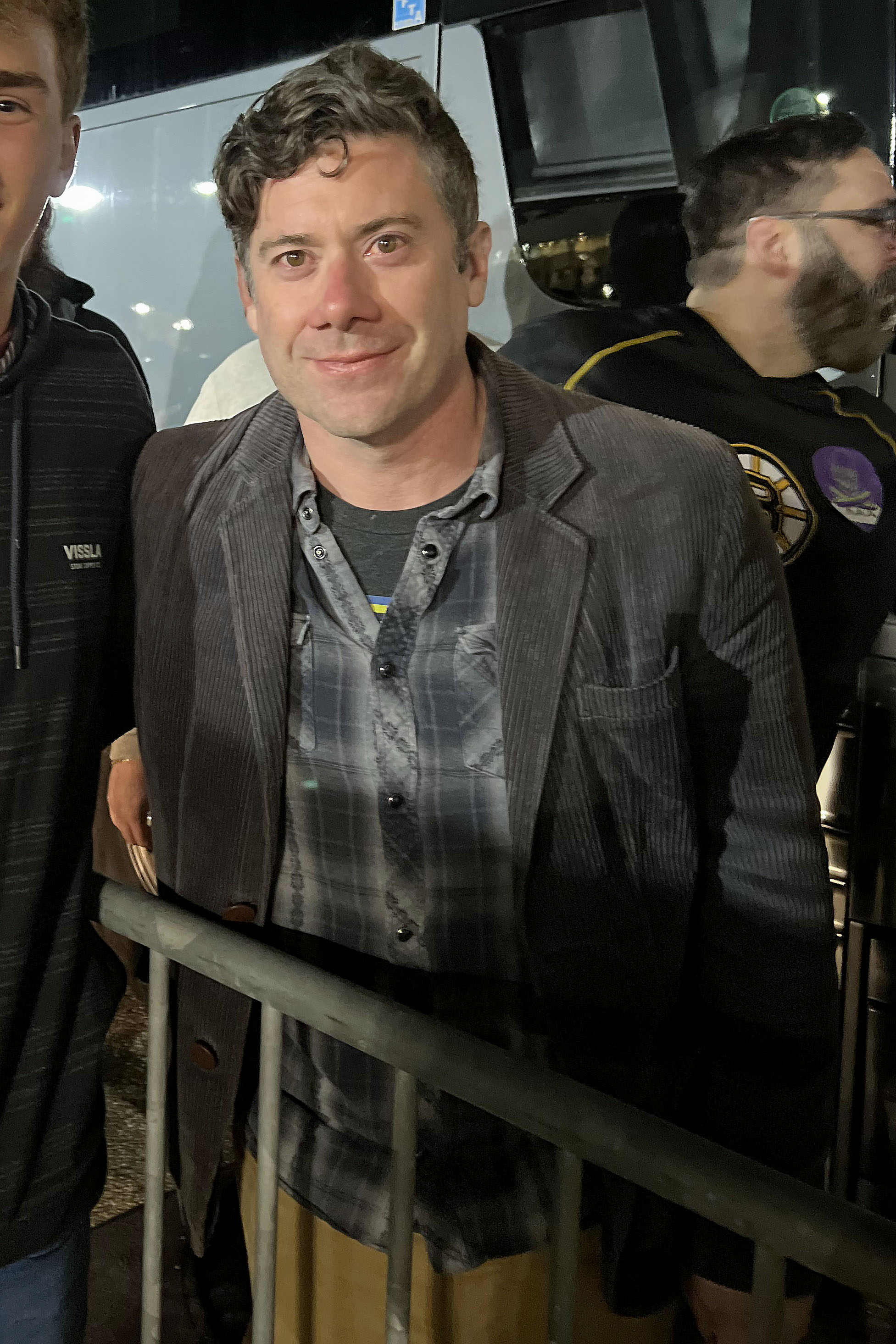
Borland without face paint, 2022

In April 1998, Borland married his long-time girlfriend Heather McMillan. The couple divorced in 2001. His second marriage was to Anna Carlise in March 2009. They divorced in 2013. In October 2016, he married Carré Callaway, lead singer of Queen Kwong. The couple resided together in Detroit. Callaway filed for divorce in 2019. In January 2023, Borland filed a defamation lawsuit against Callaway for statements Callaway made during an interview. In March 2023, it was announced that Borland’s lawsuit had been dismissed by a Detroit judge.

Callaway and Borland were passionate about rescuing abandoned cats around the Detroit area, and together starred in a DIY Network renovation show, which followed their relocation to Detroit and subsequent renovation of a large house.

Borland is currently in a relationship with Alie Jo Kvitek.

Borland says "growing up as a minister's son in a Christian family who were conservative with that kind of stuff had an effect on me". Borland says he is an atheist, but although he does not believe in heaven, he hopes he is wrong.

During a 2000 interview with Rolling Stone, Borland reveals that he was diagnosed with ADHD as a child, and he regularly took Dexedrine in treatment for behavioral issues, though he is an advocate for treatment without medication.

Borland revealed on Dean Delray’s Let There Be Talk podcast that he had invested most of his early earnings in risky stock market investments. He stated that the market decline, as a result of the September 11 attacks, wiped out most of his wealth.

== Equipment ==
Borland used Ibanez seven-string guitars exclusively from 1997 until 1999. However, he stated that he played a 6-string guitar on the entire Three Dollar Bill, Y'all record. Shortly after embarking on a tour with Korn, Ibanez contacted Borland and gave him a number of seven-string Universe guitars, essentially for free, which he continued to use extensively. During the touring in support of Significant Other, Borland used two custom Ibanez RG seven-strings with the electronic setup of an Ibanez AX7521 (two volume knobs and two tone knobs rather than one volume and one tone). Nothing is certain about the type of pickups that he used, however, he did use EMG pickups at one point, stating in an interview with GuitarCenter that he was moving from "passive to active pickups". Borland also endorsed the rare Ibanez RG7 CST guitar, which is made from superior/high-quality materials and is also equipped with an L.R. Baggs designed piezo system on a locking tremolo. He is currently one of two American owners of one.

Borland is one of the few guitarists to utilize tenor guitars, which has 4-strings as opposed to the standard 6-strings. In the early days, he used a vintage Ibanez Musician MC150PW, which was modified to be fitted with 4-strings, which he used on songs such as "Nookie", "Full Nelson", and "The One". This guitar can be seen in the music video for "Nookie." Ibanez then made him a custom baritone 4-string AX that would be used to replace the Musician. This was eventually replaced by a custom-made Master Guitars "Cremona" 4-string made by luthier George Gorodnitski, a friend of DJ Lethal's father. Borland has been on record saying that "George's guitars are the best I've ever played.” In April 2022, Borland commissioned PRS Guitars to make a custom tenor guitar.

During the recording for Chocolate Starfish and the Hot Dog Flavored Water, Borland switched to 6-string guitars. The entire album was recorded using a Master Guitars Cremona semi-hollow body guitar, which is visible in the video for My Generation. However, Borland did not tour with this guitar and instead used Paul Reed Smith guitars, one of which is a Standard 24 in a Platinum Metallic finish, a Custom 24 in a Black Slate finish, and a 4-string baritone. After the tour, they were not seen again. A Facebook photo posted by Fred Durst in 2012 shows Borland playing the Cremona again for studio purposes.

In 2005, Yamaha approached Borland about a new signature guitar, which was almost 100% designed by Borland. The model CV820WB was released that same year. A semi-hollow body guitar with a large body and new Yamaha high-output split field humbuckers, made exclusively for that guitar, it also came with the Yamaha Quick Change finger-clamp locking tremolo system, which rids the user of having to cut the ball ends off of the strings, which is very unusual for a locking tremolo. This was Borland's main guitar for the recording of Black Light Burns' Cruel Melody and the touring behind it, as well as most of the touring Limp Bizkit did before the recording of Gold Cobra. Despite its innovative characteristics, it was not a popular guitar, and was discontinued in mid-2011, when Borland switched to Jackson Guitars.

Borland endorsed Jackson Guitars shortly before the release of Gold Cobra, and owns several Rhoads guitars, which he uses on Limp Bizkit shows. In addition, he plays various Warriors and King Vs, one of which is a left-handed black King V with white bevels that was converted by Borland into a right-handed guitar. All of these instruments are equipped with a Floyd Rose and a single Seymour Duncan Invader pickup in the bridge position. He currently has a signature model with Jackson replicating his left turn right handed King V. Additionally, Borland also uses a Fender Bass VI, tuned to one octave below E standard tuning. He uses this on "The Story" on The Unquestionable Truth (Part 1), and again on "90.2.10", "Walking Away", and "Back Porch" on the Gold Cobra record.

Other guitars Borland has been seen with before are a 1976 Fender Starcaster a stock ESP LTD V-401DX (used on the Limp Bizkit reunion tour for playing songs on Results May Vary) and Mayones Regius Pro 6, Legend and Setius GTM 6 Baritone guitars.

Borland tunes his guitars to C# standard tuning (C# F# B E G# C#) and to Drop B tuning (B F# B E G# C#). He also tunes his 4-string baritone guitars to a variant of this tuning with a low F# string, which is a bass string (F# F# B E). During the late 1990s when Borland played 7-string guitars, he played them like one would play a 6-string guitar by tuning the highest string to C# as well, while maintaining standard C# tuning all the way to the seventh string. This technique was later used by Stephen Carpenter of Deftones so he could play the songs he originally recorded on a six-string without losing the feel of a seven-string, as Limp Bizkit and the Deftones had toured together in the mid 1990s.

Borland uses Ernie Ball "Burly Slinky" .011-.052 gauge nickel-wound strings, where the G string is wound. For Limp Bizkit's first three albums, Borland used Mesa/Boogie Dual and Triple Rectifier amps. In 2000, Borland would use the Mesa/Boogie heads in conjunction with a Diezel VH4. In the mid 2000s, on the recording of Cruel Melody and The Unquestionable Truth (Part 1), Borland's main amp was the Diezel VH4. Starting with the 2008 recording of The Moment You Realize You're Going to Fall Borland played mainly Orange Amps (specifically the Thunderverb 100 models) since touring in support of Cruel Melody began and has continued to use them since then, also on Gold Cobra. Currently, Borland plays EVH Amps and cabinets for his heavier tones. The mainstay of Borland's amp setup has been a Roland JC-120 combo amplifier to generate his particularly exceptional clean tones.

== Style ==
"Shotgun" (sample)
"Shotgun", from Limp Bizkit's album Gold Cobra, highlights Borland's unique playing style in this solo.

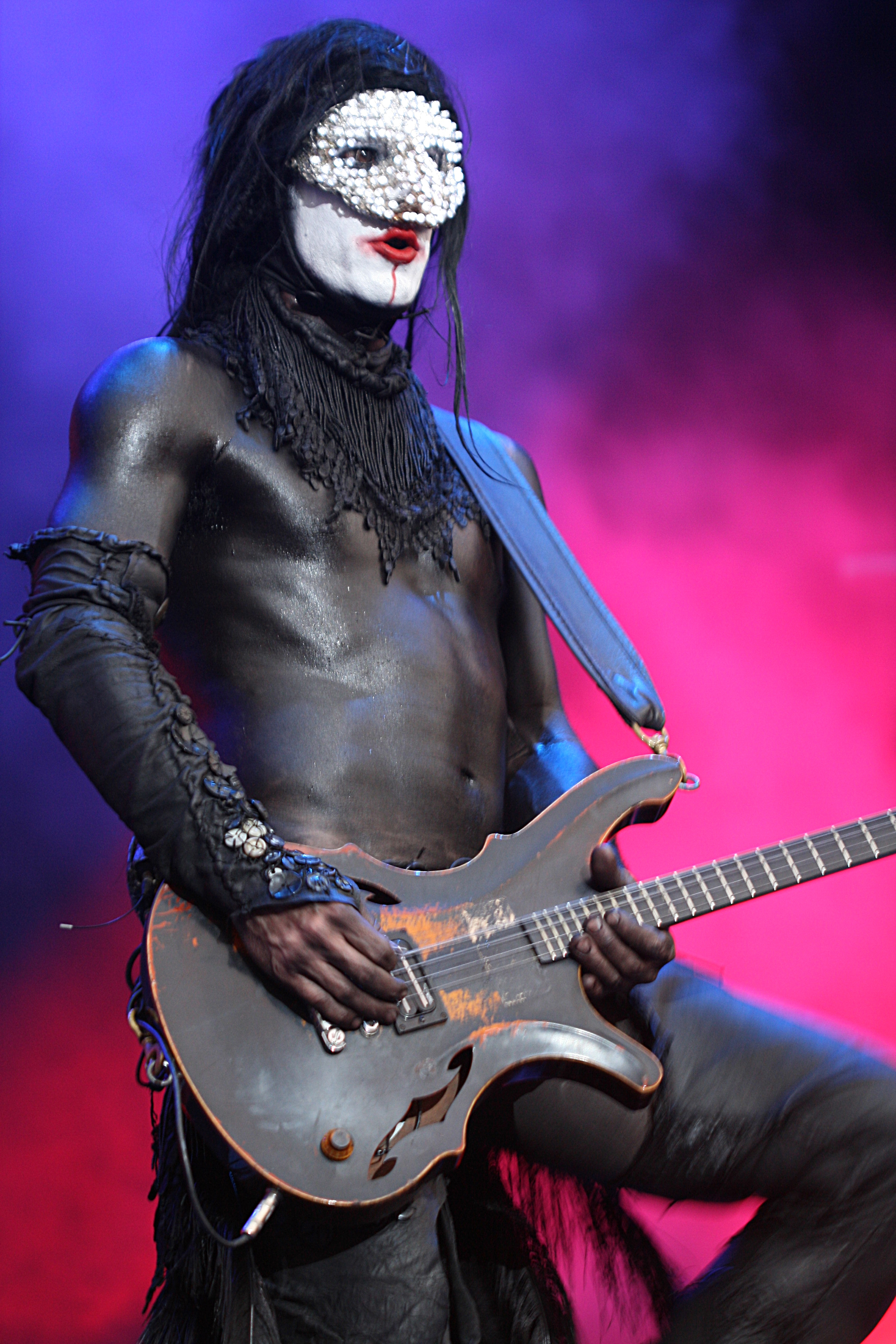
Borland is known for his visual performance style, and often performs wearing costumes or body paint.

Borland's guitar playing is experimental and nontraditional, and he is noted for his creative use of six and seven-string guitars. Three Dollar Bill, Yall features him playing without a guitar pick, performing with two hands, one playing melodic notes, and the other playing chord progressions. The song "Stuck" uses a sustain pedal in the first bar, and muted riffs in the second bar. His guitar playing has made use of octave shapes, and choppy, eighth-note rhythms, sometimes accompanied by muting his strings with his left hand, creating a percussive sound. Borland has also made use of unevenly accented syncopated sixteenth notes to create a disorienting effect, and hypnotic, droning licks. Borland uses a locking vibrato system quite extensively to "dive bomb" notes in the middle of guitar parts, as heard in songs like Limp Bizkit's "Hot Dog" and "Get a Life". He said that he got the idea to dive notes down an octave then have them come back up from trombone players.

Borland's playing is still identifiable in Black Light Burns, but by his own admission, he strives to go for a cleaner type of sound in Black Light Burns, where the heaviness comes from his bass playing, instead of in Limp Bizkit where he seeks a more metal-oriented sound. He plays keyboards and textures more overtly as tools to layer Black Light Burns' sound where in Limp Bizkit the layers are considered by the full band more.

Borland writes songs by forming them in rough outlines and filling in the details later. According to Borland, "I'm good at creating ideas while using a guitar in a new way, but it takes me a long time. I can't just come up with stuff fast and rip it up. I think about constructing songs, and even riffs, in the same way as a painting, putting on a little bit at a time. They're sketchy at first, and then I know what I want, and I fit notes into places."

Borland is also known for performing in costumes and body paint during concerts, appearing in bunny and kung fu suits, and painted as a skeleton and what he describes as a "burnt match". Describing the character, he stated, "I go onstage wearing almost nothing. I have underwear and my boots on, and I paint my whole head black—from the neck up—and I have the black contacts. All you can see is these glowing teeth." Borland's black contacts were customized for him by a company noted for making contacts for the science fiction TV series Babylon 5.

== Discography ==
Solo

- Crystal Machete (2016)
- Matadors and Daughters (EP) (2018)
- The Astral Hand (2020)
- Mutiny on the Starbarge (2023)

Limp Bizkit

- Three Dollar Bill, Y'all (1997)
- Significant Other (1999)
- Chocolate Starfish and the Hot Dog Flavored Water (2000)
- The Unquestionable Truth (Part 1) (2005)
- Gold Cobra (2011)
- Still Sucks (2021)

Big Dumb Face

- Duke Lion Fights the Terror!! (2001)
- Where Is Duke Lion? He's Dead... (2017)
- Christmas in the Cave of Dagoth (2021)

Black Light Burns

- Cruel Melody (2007)
- Cover Your Heart and the Anvil Pants Odyssey (2008)
- The Moment You Realize You're Going to Fall (2012)
- Lotus Island (2013)

Eat the Day

- The Demos (2020) (recorded in 2002)
- The Addendum (2020) (recorded in 2002)

Goatslayer

- The Feather Serpent (2020) (recorded in 1993)

Other appearances

- The Damning Well – Underworld (2003)
- The Crystal Method – Legion of Boom (2004)
- From First to Last – Heroine (2006)
- Drop Dead, Gorgeous – Worse Than a Fairy Tale (2007)
- Filter – Anthems for the Damned (2008)
- The Color of Violence – Youthanize (2009)
- Combichrist – Scarred (EP) (2010)
- Combichrist – Making Monsters (2010)
- tomandandy – Resident Evil : Afterlife 3D (Music From The Motion Picture) (2010)
- tomandandy – Resident Evil: Retribution (Music From The Motion Picture) (2012)
- Tech N9ne – Therapy (2013)
- Queen Kwong – The Strange Fruit (2014)
- Tina Guo – Cello Metal (2015)
- Sukekiyo – VITIUM (2015)
- DREAD – In Dub (2017)
- Queen Kwong – Love Me to Death (2018)
- Jonathan Davis – Black Labyrinth (2018)

== Filmography ==
List of films and TV shows appeared in
Year	Title	Role	Notes
2012	Oddities (TV series)	Himself	Episode: "Holly-Odd"
2016	Sight Unseen (TV series)	Himself	Episodes: 1-6
