= 2024 in rock music =

This article summarizes the events related to rock music for the year 2024.

== Notable events ==
=== January ===
- The British all-female indie rock band The Last Dinner Party is named the BBC Sound of 2024. Shortly after, they release their debut studio album, Prelude to Ecstasy. The album not only debuts at number one on the national all-format UK albums chart, but its sales is the highest debut album from a musician in almost a decade.
- Green Day releases their 14th studio album, Saviors. It is the band's first in four years, and first in twelve years to be recorded with record producer Rob Cavallo, who previously produced Dookie (1994) and American Idiot (2004). Saviors tops the UK all-format albums chart, their fifth album to do so. In the US, the album debuts at number 4 on the US all-format Billboard 200 top albums chart, moving 49,000 album equivalent units.
- In a run that starts in November 2023, and extends into January, Green Day's single "The American Dream Is Killing Me" tops the Billboard Mainstream Rock chart, and stays atop of the chart for 8 weeks straight.
- No Doubt announces they are reforming for the first time in almost a decade.
- English rock band The Smile release their second studio album, Wall of Eyes. It debuts in the top 10 of 15 separate national album charts.

=== February ===
- February 4 – 66th Annual Grammy Awards are held. Indie supergroup Boygenius win two awards for their song "Not Strong Enough" – Best Rock Performance and Best Rock Song, and one award for The Record – Best Alternative Music Album. Pop punk band Paramore's album This Is Why wins Best Rock Album, which is the first time a female-fronted band has ever won the award.
- Linkin Park releases "Friendly Fire", a previously unreleased song from One More Light (2017). The song features vocals recorded by Chester Bennington prior to his death in 2017, similar to 2023 single "Lost". Like "Lost" a year prior, "Friendly Fire" debuts atop the Billboard Rock Airplay chart. It stays there for two weeks, but falls well short of the performance of "Lost", which spent 20 weeks atop the chart, and fails to break into the Billboard Hot 100 chart.
- Daughtry's single "Artificial" tops the Billboard Mainstream Rock chart for the first time in their career. Despite 17 years of appearing on the chart, the band's music had historically performed stronger in pop music formats, during their massive popularity in the late 2000s.

=== March ===
- Finnish nu metal band Blind Channel releases their fifth studio album, Exit Emotions. It debuts at the top of the Finnish national album charts.
- English heavy metal band Iron Maiden's frontman, Bruce Dickinson, releases his seventh solo studio album, The Mandrake Project. It's his first solo studio album in almost 20 years, since Tyranny of Souls (2005). It debuts in the top 5 of 10 separate national album charts.
- English rock musicians Liam Gallagher, and John Squire, release a collaborative studio album, titled Liam Gallagher John Squire. It debuts in the top 10 of 7 separate national album charts.
- Swedish rock singer Erik Grönwall leaves US band Skid Row to prioritise his recovery from acute lymphoblastic leukemia. He is replaced on immediately proceeding tour dates by Lzzy Hale of the band Halestorm. The arrangement is temporarily, but well-received, to the point of Jon Bon Jovi leaving a statement that he hopes she will continue with the band.
- English heavy metal band Judas Priest releases their 19th studio album, Invincible Shield, their first album in six years. It had been recorded over the course of the prior four years, in between issues arisen by the COVID-19 pandemic and touring. The album enters the UK all-format albums chart at number 2, the highest chart entry of their entire career.
- Dutch rock band Di-rect releases their tenth studio album, Sphinx. It debuts at number 2 on the Dutch Album Top 100.
- Canadian rock band Sum 41 releases their eighth and final studio album, Heaven :x: Hell. It is a double album, with each disc following its own musical theme. Heaven explores the pop-punk sound of the band's mainstream popularity in the early 2000s, while Hell follows the heavy metal sound the band pursued in subsequent years. The band plans to breakup following the completion of the album's touring cycle in 2025. The album debuts at number five on the Billboard Top Album Sales chart; the band's career highest on a US all-format sales chart.
- Rapper Machine Gun Kelly, after pivoting to pop punk and releasing two Billboard 200 chart-topping albums Tickets to My Downfall (2020) and Mainstream Sellout (2022), changes genre again and releases a collaborative emo rap release with Trippie Redd called Genre: Sadboy. The pivot to emo rap leads to a drastic decrease in performance; Tickets debuted with 126,000 units and 60,000 sales, Mainstream debuted with 93,000 units and 42,000 sales, and Genre: Sadboy debuted with only 17,000 units and 7,000 in sales.
- Pearl Jam's first new song in 4 years, "Dark Matter", tops the Billboard Mainstream Rock chart and stays there for 4 consecutive weeks.

=== April ===
- Irish musician Hozier's single "Too Sweet" tops the Billboard Global 200 chart, making it the most popular song in the world for a week. It individually tops the all-format national song charts for Australia, New Zealand, US, and UK as well.
- Welsh rock band Feeder releases their twelfth studio album, a double album titled Black/Red. The release was recorded as part of a trilogy between it and Torpedo (2022). The band, started in the 1990s, has seen a resurgence of commercial success in the UK with its prior two albums, Torpedo and Tallulah (2019). It debuts in the top 10 of the UK and Scottish all-format albums charts.
- The Black Keys release their twelfth studio album, Ohio Players. The album is their most collaborative to date, with the duo working with many outside musicians and producers, including Dan the Automator, Greg Kurstin, Beck, and Noel Gallagher. It debuts in the top 10 of 5 separate national all-format albums charts, but only at number 26 on the US Billboard 200.
- Linkin Park releases their first greatest hits album, titled Papercuts. It features a career-spanning collection of the band's singles. The album debuts in the top 10 of at least 13 national all-format albums charts, including number 6 on the Billboard 200 chart, moving 44,000 album equivalent units.
- Pearl Jam releases their twelfth studio album, Dark Matter. Work on the album began in mid-2022 with Andrew Watt, who has been heavily involved with music production with pop musicians and in the 2020s, Ozzy Osbourne. The goal in working with him was to make more spontaneous music rather than the lengthy recording times of prior albums. The album debuts in the top 10 of at least 11 national all-format albums charts, including number 5 on the US Billboard 200 chart, moving 59,000 album equivalent units.
- Mötley Crüe releases "Dogs of War", their first song in over five years. It is their first release since the band replaced longtime guitarist Mick Mars with John 5 due to his ongoing battle with ankylosing spondylitis. Prior to its release, the song drew controversy after bassist Nikki Sixx claimed that "people who have heard it say it's a powerful cross between country and hip hop". The comment confused and upset their fanbase, which Sixx later blamed on the media's reporting on the story, despite publications largely correctly quoting his own words.

=== May ===
- English rock musician Frank Turner releases his tenth studio album, Undefeated. It debuts in the top 6 of 3 separate national album charts.
- Twenty One Pilots releases their seventh studio album, Clancy. The album is a concept album, and concludes the decade-spanning overarching story told by prior releases Blurryface (2015), Trench (2018), and Scaled and Icy (2021). Like the three albums that preceded, it debuts in the top 10 of the Billboard 200, at number 3, moving 143,000 album equivalent units. This made it the biggest week for a rock album in 2024 in the US upon its release.
- English rock band Bring Me the Horizon surprise releases their seventh studio album, Post Human: Nex Gen, the second part of their four-part Post Human series that started with Post Human: Survival Horror (2020). It is also the first release following the departure of long-term member Jordan Fish. It accumulates over 70 million streams in its opening week, leading them to be the most streamed rock band in the world for the period. It also debuts at number 5 on the UK all-format albums chart, an impressive feat considering the album's digital-only release.
- Slayer guitarist Kerry King releases his debut solo album, From Hell I Rise. It is his first album release in almost a decade, following the release of Slayer's last studio album Repentless (2015). It debuts in the top 10 of 5 separate national albums charts.
- Guns N' Roses guitarist Slash releases another solo album, Orgy of the Damned. Unlike the four solo albums he released under the moniker of Slash featuring Myles Kennedy and the Conspirators, the album is more like his self-titled 2010 solo album that featured a variety of different singers and collaborators across the album's tracks. The album also explores a more blues rock sound. The album debuts in the top 10 of 5 separate national albums charts.

=== June ===
- Bon Jovi releases their 16th studio album, Forever. The album is the first since singer Jon Bon Jovi's major throat surgery that almost forced him to retire from singing and made him have to relearn how to talk completely prior to its recording. It is the biggest selling album of the week in the US, and debuts at number 5 on the Billboard 200 chart, moving 50,000 album equivalent units. However, in its second week, the album achieves the record for largest drop on the chart, falling entirely out of the top 200.

=== July ===
- Scottish rock band Travis releases their tenth studio album, L.A. Times. It debuts in the top 2 of the UK and Scottish all-format album charts.
- English rock band Deep Purple releases their 23rd studio album, =1. It is their first album with new guitarist Simon McBride, who replaced the band's longtime guitarist Steve Morse in 2022. It debuts in the top 5 of 7 separate national album charts.
- English punk rock duo Soft Play releases their fourth studio album, Heavy Jelly. It is their first album under a new band name, after their prior name, "Slaves" attracted criticism. It debuted in the top 3 on the UK and Scottish all-format album charts.
- French heavy metal band Gojira performs at the opening ceremony of the 2024 Summer Olympics in Paris, France. They are the first heavy metal band to ever perform at the Olympics.

=== August ===
- Red Hot Chili Peppers performs at the closing ceremony of the 2024 Summer Olympics in Paris, France.
- Falling in Reverse releases their fifth studio album, Popular Monster. The release is their first in 7 years, after frontman Ronnie Radke felt their prior album, Coming Home (2017), was a commercial failure. Popular Monster fares much better; while Coming Home failed to appear in the top 10 of any national album chart, Popular Monster debuts in the top 10 of 5 national charts, and narrowly misses the top 10 of the Billboard 200, debuting at number 12. Concurrently, the single "All My Life", which features Jelly Roll, has crossover success, peaking at 77 on the US Billboard Hot 100 chart.
- Australian pop-punk band Stand Atlantic releases their fourth studio album, Was Here. It debuted at number 3 on the all-format Australian albums chart.
- English rock band Oasis announces they are reforming for the first time in 15 years for a set of 2025 tours. The announcement ends 15 years of bitter feuds between brothers Noel Gallagher and Liam Gallagher, who previously denied that any reunion would take effect. The announcement is later marred with controversies of high ticket prices and ticket scalping.
- British band Coldplay become the first group in history to gross over $1 billion on the same concert run with the Music of the Spheres World Tour.

=== September ===
- Linkin Park announces their reunion, new lineup, and first live show in seven years. Emily Armstrong of Dead Sara, replaces deceased vocalist Chester Bennington, while musician and producer Colin Brittain, replaces the band's founding drummer Rob Bourdon, who wished to distance himself from the band moving forward. They also release their first brand new song in seven years, titled "The Emptiness Machine", and announce a new studio album, From Zero. "The Emptiness Machine" debuts at number 3 on the Billboard Global 200, indicating it was the third most popular song in the world of the week.
- English rock musician David Gilmour releases his fifth solo studio album, Luck and Strange. It debuts in the top 5 of 17 separate nation album charts, including topping the UK albums chart and being the best-selling album of the week in the US.
- Finnish symphonic metal band Nightwish releases their tenth studio album, Yesterwynde. It is their first album with new bassist Jukka Koskinen, who replaced the band's longtime bassist Marko Hietala in 2022. It debuts in the top 10 of 4 separate national album charts.

=== October ===
- British band Coldplay releases their tenth studio album, Moon Music. It debuts at number one on the US Billboard all-format albums chart, moving 120,000 album equivalent units. It is the only rock album to top the chart in the entirety of 2024, and is their fifth album to top the chart. It also tops 15 other national album charts.
- English rock band The Smile releases their third studio album, Cutouts. It is the second studio album they released this year, and was recorded during the same session of their previous studio album, Wall of Eyes. It debuted in the top 10 of 9 separate national album charts.
- Canadian band Three Days Grace announce the return of original vocalist Adam Gontier, who will share the role with prior vocalist Matt Walst, despite the band not previously having a dual-lead vocalist setup. The band also announced plans for new music and touring with both vocalists.
- The Offspring releases their eleventh studio album, Supercharged, their fourth in a row to be produced by Bob Rock. The album debuts in the top 10 of 4 national album charts, but is their first in 30 years to miss the Billboard 200 chart entirely.

=== November ===
- English rock band The Cure release their fourteenth studio album, Songs of a Lost World. It is their first studio album since 4:13 Dream (2008). Frontman Robert Smith has continued to tinker and revise the album in recent years though. It debuted on the top of 13 separate national album charts. In the US, it debuts at number 4 on the Billboard 200 chart, the highest in three decades, since Wish (1992).
- Linkin Park releases their eighth studio album, From Zero. It is their first studio album without frontman Chester Bennington, who died in 2017. Emily Armstrong of Dead Sara is the band's new lead singer. It is also their first studio album without founding drummer Rob Bourdon, who chose to not return to the band's reformation. He was replaced by Colin Brittain. It debuted on the top of 16 separate national album charts. In the US, it debuted at number 2 on the Billboard 200 albums chart.
- Swedish progressive metal band Opeth releases their 14th studio album, The Last Will and Testament. It is a concept album, and their first album with new drummer Waltteri Väyrynen, who replaced the band's longtime drummer Martin Axenrot in 2022. It debuted in the top 10 of 7 separate national album charts.

=== December ===
- A Complete Unknown, a biographical musical drama film starring Timothée Chalamet as Bob Dylan, is released. The film was named one of the top ten films of 2024 by the American Film Institute and the National Board of Review, and receives many accolades and award nominations.

== Albums released ==
=== January ===
Day	Artist	Album
19	Green Day	Saviors
19	Neck Deep	Neck Deep
26	Alkaline Trio	Blood, Hair, and Eyeballs
26	The Smile	Wall of Eyes
26	Caligula's Horse	Charcoal Grace
26	Static-X	Project Regeneration Vol. 2

=== February ===
Day	Artist	Album
2	The Last Dinner Party	Prelude to Ecstasy
16	Laura Jane Grace	Hole in My Head
23	Mick Mars	The Other Side of Mars

=== March ===
Day	Artist	Album
1	Bruce Dickinson	The Mandrake Project
1	Blind Channel	Exit Emotions
1	Liam Gallagher and John Squire	Liam Gallagher John Squire
1	T.S.O.L.	A-Side Graffiti
6	Judas Priest	Invincible Shield
8	Di-rect	Sphinx
15	The Black Crowes	Happiness Bastards
29	Sum 41	Heaven :x: Hell
29	While She Sleeps	Self Hell

=== April ===
Day	Artist	Album
5	Feeder	Black/Red
5	Hawkwind	Stories from Time and Space
5	Alpha Wolf	Half Living Things
5	Erra	Cure
5	The Black Keys	Ohio Players
12	Linkin Park	Papercuts (Greatest hits album)
19	Pearl Jam	Dark Matter
19	High on Fire	Cometh the Storm
19	SeeYouSpaceCowboy	Coup de Grâce
19	NOFX	Half Album (EP)

=== May ===
Day	Artist	Album
3	Frank Turner	Undefeated
10	Unleash the Archers	Phantoma
10	Powerman 5000	Abandon Ship
10	Knocked Loose	You Won't Go Before You're Supposed To
17	Krezip	Music for Máxima
17	Kerry King	From Hell I Rise
17	Marty Friedman	Drama
17	Slash	Orgy of the Damned
24	Twenty One Pilots	Clancy
24	Bring Me the Horizon	Post Human: Nex Gen
31	Rhapsody of Fire	Challenge the Wind

=== June ===
Day	Artist	Album
7	Bon Jovi	Forever
21	The Story So Far	I Want to Disappear
28	The Warning	Keep Me Fed
28	Anvil	One and Only

=== July ===
Day	Artist	Album
12	Travis	L.A. Times
12	Tim Montana	Savage
19	Deep Purple	=1
19	Soft Play	Heavy Jelly
26	Powerwolf	Wake Up the Wicked

=== August ===
Day	Artist	Album
2	X	Smoke & Fiction
2	The Smashing Pumpkins	Aghori Mhori Mei
9	Four Year Strong	Analysis Paralysis
9	Destroy Boys	Funeral Soundtrack No. 4
16	Yours Truly	Toxic
23	Simone Simons	Vermillion
23	Stand Atlantic	Was Here

=== September ===
Day	Artist	Album
6	David Gilmour	Luck and Strange
6	Boston Manor	Sundiver
6	The The	Ensoulment
13	156/Silence	People Watching
13	Foxing	Foxing
20	Fidlar	Surviving the Dream
20	Nightwish	Yesterwynde
20	Seether	The Surface Seems So Far
20	The Voidz	Like All Before You

=== October ===
Day	Artist	Album
4	The Smile	Cutouts
4	Trash Boat	Heaven Can Wait
4	Coldplay	Moon Music
4	Geordie Greep	The New Sound
4	Mötley Crüe	Cancelled (EP)
11	Real Friends	Blue Hour
11	The Linda Lindas	No Obligation
11	Dawes	Oh Brother
11	The Offspring	Supercharged
18	Jerry Cantrell	I Want Blood
18	Pinhead Gunpowder	Unt
25	Pixies	The Night the Zombies Came

=== November ===
Day	Artist	Album
1	The Cure	Songs of a Lost World
8	State Champs	State Champs
8	Delain	Dance with the Devil (EP)
13	Zebrahead	I (EP)
15	Linkin Park	From Zero
22	Opeth	The Last Will and Testament

== Tours and festivals ==
- Irish band U2 conclude their Las Vegas concert residency U2:UV Achtung Baby Live at Sphere.
- June 5-8 – Sweden Rock Festival takes place at Blekinge. The line-up includes Judas Priest, Alice Cooper, Megadeth, Dimmu Borgir and Igorrr.
- June 6-8 – NorthSide Festival takes place in Aarhus, Denmark. Performers include Amyl and the Sniffers, Daði Freyr, and Guldimund.
- June 26-30 – Rock performers at the Glastonbury Festival 2024 in Somerset, UK, include France's Justice, Niger's Mdou Moctar, Japan's Otoboke Beaver, England's Bombay Bicycle Club, Wales's Skindred and the US's Blondshell.
- In celebration of Maynard James Keenan's 60th birthday, a tour where he fronts both A Perfect Circle and Puscifer will take place across April and May 2024. An accompanying EP release, Sessanta E.P.P.P. will be released in support of the tour. In particular, it marks the first live shows and new material ("Kindred") from A Perfect Circle since 2018's Eat the Elephant.
- Slayer announces their reunion after initially breaking up in 2019. They played at the Riot Fest, and at the Louder Than Life festival in September 2024.
- Lollapalooza South America's lineup in March features many rock bands, including Blink-182, Paramore, Limp Bizkit, and The Offspring.
- When We Were Young festival was held on 19 and 20 October. It was headlined by My Chemical Romance, and Fall Out Boy, and featured many others bands including Neck Deep, Sleeping with Sirens, Four Year Strong, Simple Plan, and more.

== Band breakups ==
- Issues disbanded following three farewell shows that took place in January 2024.
- Rage Against the Machine drummer Brad Wilk announced their third disbandment on January 3, 2024.
- Candlebox disband following the conclusion of touring in support of their final album.
- Porno for Pyros disbanded following their 2024 farewell tour.
- Off! announced their disbandment after three farewell shows in July 2024.
- Jane's Addiction enters a hiatus following frontman Perry Farrell initiating a physical altercation mid-song with guitarist Dave Navarro at a live show in September.
- NOFX disbanded after playing their final ever live shows after 41 years of performing in October 2024.
- Amen abruptly ended after lead singer Casey Chaos died in December 2024.
- The Postal Service
- REO Speedwagon

== Deaths ==
- January 2 – Chris Karrer, 76, German progressive rock guitarist (Amon Düül II)
- January 9 – James Kottak, 61, American rock drummer (Scorpions, Kingdom Come, Warrant)
- January 29 – Yuri Ilchenko, 72, Russian singer and guitarist (Mify, Zemlyane)
- February 8 – Yuri Borzov, 70, Russian blues rock drummer (Mashina Vremeni)
- February 9 – Damo Suzuki, 74, Japanese Krautrock singer (Can)
- February 12 – Juris Kulakovs, 65, Latvian musician (Pērkons)
- February 16 – Greg "Fritz" Hinz, 68, Canadian rock drummer (Helix)
- February 20 – Vitalij Kuprij, 48, Ukrainian keyboardist (Trans-Siberian Orchestra, Artension, Ring of Fire)
- March 3 – Félix Sabal Lecco, 64/5, Cameroonian drummer
- March 8 – Ľubomír Stankovský, 72, Slovak singer and drummer (Modus)
- March 10
  - Blake Harrison, 48, American rock bassist and sampler (Hatebeak, Pig Destroyer)
  - Marc Tobaly, 74, Moroccan-born French guitarist (Les Variations)
  - T. M. Stevens, 72, American rock bassist
- March 11 – Eric Carmen, 74, American musician (Raspberries)
- March 12 – Russ Wilson, 62, Canadian bass guitarist (Junkhouse)
- March 17 – Steve Harley, 73, English musician (Steve Harley & Cockney Rebel)
- April 1 – Michael Ward, 57, American guitarist (The Wallflowers)
- April 2
  - Jerry Abbott, 80, American record producer, father of Dimebag Darrell and Vinnie Paul (Pantera, Damageplan)
  - Notker Wolf, 83, German Benedictine priest-monk and rock musician
- April 4 – Keith LeBlanc, 69, American drummer and music producer (collaborated with Nine Inch Nails, Peter Gabriel, Ministry, The Cure)
- April 5 – C. J. Snare, 64, American rock singer (FireHouse)
- April 9 – Max Werner, 70, Dutch progressive rock singer and drummer (Kayak)
- April 16
  - Gavin Webb, 77, Australian rock bassist (The Masters Apprentices)
  - Reita, 42, Japanese rock bassist (The Gazette)
- April 17 – Eddie Sutton, 59, American rock singer (Leeway)
- April 18 – Dickey Betts, 80, American rock guitarist (The Allman Brothers Band)
- April 20 – Jean-Marie Aerts, 72, Belgian guitarist (TC Matic)
- May 4 – Miroslav Imrich, 71, Czech rock singer (Abraxas)
- May 7 – Steve Albini, 61, American musician and music producer
- May 18 – Jon Wysocki, 56, American rock drummer (Staind, Soil)
- May 22 – Toni Montano, 62, Serbian rock musician
- May 28 – Gustavo Mullem, 72, Brazilian punk rock guitarist (Camisa de Vênus)
- June 5
  - Ranch Sironi, American rock bassist (Nebula)
  - Adam Lewis, 45, American rock bassist (Fenix TX)
- June 9 – Alex Riel, 83, Danish jazz and rock drummer
- June 24 – Shifty Shellshock, 49, American rock musician (Crazy Town)
- July 24 – Bill Crook, Canadian rock bassist (Spiritbox, Living with Lions)
- September 5 – Herbie Flowers, 86, English rock bassist (T. Rex, Blue Mink, Sky)
- September 18 – Dick Diamonde, 76, Australian rock bassist (The Easybeats)
- October 21 – Paul Di'Anno, 66, English rock musician (Iron Maiden)
- November 24 – Bob Bryar, 44, American musician and sound engineer (My Chemical Romance)
- December 18 – Slim Dunlap, 73, American rock guitarist (The Replacements)
- December 21 – Casey Chaos, 59, American rock singer (Amen, Christian Death)
