= Patience (Mannequin Pussy album) =

Studio album by Mannequin Pussy
- Released: June 21, 2019
- Studio: Studio 4 (Conshohocken, Pennsylvania)
- Genre: Punk rock
- Length: 25:34
- Label: Epitaph
- Producer: Will Yip

Mannequin Pussy chronology
Romantic (2016)	Patience (2019)	Perfect (2021)

Patience is the third album by punk rock quartet Mannequin Pussy, released in June 2019 by Epitaph Records.

It was produced by Will Yip, who has worked alongside musicians and bands like Code Orange, Turnover and more.

== Critical reception ==
Professional ratings
Aggregate scores
Source	Rating
Metacritic	85/100
Review scores
Source	Rating
AllMusic	4/5 stars
Exclaim!	8/10
Pitchfork	8.4/10

Patience was released to critical acclaim. On Metacritic, it holds a score of 85 out of 100, indicating "universal acclaim", based on eight reviews.

Quinn Moreland of Pitchfork gave the record a glowing assessment, calling it "one of the best punk rock records" of 2019.

In 2026 Rolling Stone placed it at 42 on their list of The 100 Greatest Punk Albums of All Time.

=== Accolades ===
==== Year-end lists ====
Accolades for Patience
Publication	Work	List	Rank	Ref.
No Ripcord	Patience	The 50 Best Albums of 2019	30	
Paste	Patience	The 50 Best Albums of 2019	33	
Pitchfork	Patience	The 50 Best Albums of 2019	35	
Pitchfork	Patience	The Best Rock Albums of 2019	--	
Pitchfork	"Drunk II"	The 100 Best Songs of 2019	16	

== Track listing ==
All words by Marisa Dabice. All songs by Mannequin Pussy.

Patience track listing
No.	Title	Length
1.	"Patience"	2:12
2.	"Drunk II"	4:28
3.	"Cream"	1:55
4.	"Fear/+/Desire"	3:35
5.	"Drunk I"	0:53
6.	"High Horse"	2:58
7.	"Who You Are"	2:32
8.	"Clams"	0:38
9.	"F.U.C.A.W."	2:05
10.	"In Love Again"	4:18
Total length:		25:34

== Personnel ==
Mannequin Pussy

- Marisa Dabice – vocals, guitar
- Athanasios Paul – guitar, keys
- Colins Rey Regisford – bass, samples, vocals
- Kaleen Reading – drums, percussion
