= Isaac Bitton =

French-American musician

- Also known as: Jacky
- Born: 2 December 1947 (age 78); Casablanca, Morocco
- Genres: Jewish rock, rock and roll, rhythm and blues, soul, Middle Eastern
- Instruments: Vocals, guitar, drums
- Years active: 1966–present

Isaac "Jacky" Bitton (born 2 December 1947) is a French-American musician. Initially gaining fame as the drummer for secular rock band Les Variations, Bitton became a baal teshuva through Chabad in the late 1970s and subsequently began a career in contemporary Jewish music.

== Early history ==
Born in Casablanca, Morocco to a Jewish family, Bitton moved from Morocco to France alone at the age of 18. Together with his friends, he formed a rock group and played locally until getting noticed in 1969. Les Variations opened for some of the top billed rockers of the day, such as Bachman–Turner Overdrive, Kiss, The Jimi Hendrix Experience, Cream, Taste and Aerosmith.

Having a close affinity to his Jewish roots, Bitton always wore the Star of David around his neck while performing.

Bitton is said to have been rated at the time in the top three drummers of Europe. He jammed with John Bonham and Robert Plant in a club in Belgium.

== Jewish identity ==
Bitton met Chabad emissaries (shluchim) who helped him further discover his Orthodox Jewish heritage.

== Les Variations' end ==
By the end of 1975, Les Variations, with their new singer Robert Fitoussi, were nearing a deal to tour with the Rolling Stones. The deal did not come to fruition, however, because the singer soon left the group. Bitton took the opportunity to go to New York, where he met the Lubavitcher Rebbe for the first time.

Bitton settled in the Chabad Lubavitch neighborhood of Crown Heights, Brooklyn, where he still lives with his family.

== Music career after Les Variations: crossover into modern Jewish music ==
In 1977, the Baal Shem Tov Band (BSTB) was formed at the Lubavitch Rabbinical College of America, in Morristown, New Jersey, as part of an outreach program to college students. The regular members included Menachem Schmidt(snare drum), Tzvi Freeman (acoustic guitar), Moshe Morgenstern (cello), and business and equipment manager Shlomo Sawilowsky. They were occasionally complemented by a violinist and a flutist who attended the college. Subsequently, Bitton, who had moved to the nearby Crown Heights section of Brooklyn, New York, joined and completed the group.

With the addition of Bitton, Schmidt was able to move to lead guitar, Freeman to rhythm guitar, and Morgenstern to bass guitar. The combination of Schmidt's creative genius and powerful rock licks with Bitton's Sephardi/Moroccan rhythm and lead vocals produced an electric rock and roll sound. They played traditional Chabad nigunim (songs and melodies) to this beat at Chabad houses on college campuses and other venues, primarily on the Eastern seaboard of the United States. One of the highlights of each performance was Bitton's drum solo. A four-song demo was cut in a local studio, but the BSTB disbanded in 1978 as the rabbinical students began to graduate.

The experience with the BSTB provided a transition for Bitton. Subsequently, he was the founding member of the Jewish music group "Raaya Mehemna" ("Faithful Servant" – a reference to a Kabbalistic work; the group was later renamed "Raava Mehemna"), which was formed in the early 1980s. Bitton was perhaps the first religious Jew to infuse music on religious Jewish themes with "non-Jewish" styles such as rock and soul. He helped establish the idea of Jewish rock with his heavy hitting style and brought real rock and roll showmanship to the Jewish stage. In the early 80's he released two albums titled "Songs for a Brother Vol 1&2".

Currently, Bitton makes new music, and performs at concerts occasionally. He performed at Yeshiva University on 6 May 2007 at a Lag B'Omer celebration concert. The opening group played with little response. Once Bitton began his set on the drums to the tune of "Im Ein Ani Li Mi Li" the crowd erupted.

Bitton is widely known for his energetic drumming style, soulful powerful voice, and for fusing traditional Moroccan tunes and scales with R&B, blues, and soul. He has served as leader and cantor for a Sefardi synagogue in Crown Heights since the early 1980s, where his musical signature is evident in his cantorial renditions.

== Making headlines ==
Bitton has played some shows geared toward an Orthodox Jewish audience, but has not rekindled his music career to his former level of a chart topping rock musician. He has since served as a hotel manager for the Crown Palace Hotel in Crown Heights and as a kosher food supervisor (mashgiach).

=== 1990s ===
In 1991, Bitton made headlines when he was hit by rocks and bottles, during the Crown Heights Riot. Due to the rioting, Bitton called a cab to take him and his son to his house. The driver refused to take them all the way to their house, letting them off one block away. Police were stationed at each end of the street. They informed Bitton it was safe to continue, and no police accompanied them. However, within a block, they were attacked by an angry mob of Caribbean American, West Indian, and African American rioters. The Bittons were removed from the scene by local residents and reporters, including Peter Noel, a West Indian journalist for the Village Voice.

Bitton suffered a torn rotator cuff and required 10 stitches to his head. His son was struck by bottles and bricks, and suffered hearing loss and psychological damage. Riot police saw the attack but failed to respond, choosing instead to radio for reinforcements. This was due to their instructions to remain in fixed positions during the early stages of the rioting. The police reinforcements were also met by an attack of rocks and bottles from the rioters, but none of the rioters were arrested. Subsequently, Bitton sued and was awarded $200,000 by New York City.

== Discography ==
=== With Les Variations ===
- Nador (1969)
- Take It Or Leave It (1971)
- Moroccan Roll (1973)
- Cafe De Paris (1975)

=== With Raava Mehemna ===
- Songs for a Brother, Vol. I (1982) (as Raya Mehemna)
- Songs for a Brother, Vol. II (1984)

=== Solo albums ===
- Generation Redemption (2011, YODI Group)
