= List of European number-one hits of 1982 =

This is a list of the Hitkrant Europarade number-one singles of 1982.

Date	Song	Artist
3 January	"One of Us"	ABBA
10 January	"One of Us"	ABBA
17 January	"One of Us"	ABBA
24 January	"One of Us"	ABBA
31 January	"One of Us"	ABBA
7 February	"One of Us"	ABBA
14 February	"Cambodia"	Kim Wilde
21 February	"Cambodia"	Kim Wilde
28 February	"Cambodia"	Kim Wilde
6 March	"Oh Julie"	Shakin' Stevens
13 March	"Oh Julie"	Shakin' Stevens
20 March	"Oh Julie"	Shakin' Stevens
27 March	"Oh Julie"	Shakin' Stevens
3 April	"Oh Julie"	Shakin' Stevens
10 April	"Oh Julie"	Shakin' Stevens
17 April	"Oh Julie"	Shakin' Stevens
24 April	"Oh Julie"	Shakin' Stevens
1 May	"The Lion Sleeps Tonight"	Tight Fit
8 May	"The Lion Sleeps Tonight"	Tight Fit
15 May	"View From a Bridge"	Kim Wilde
22 May	"Ein Bißchen Frieden/A Little Peace"	Nicole
29 May	"Ein Bißchen Frieden/A Little Peace"	Nicole
5 June	"Ein Bißchen Frieden/A Little Peace"	Nicole
12 June	"Ein Bißchen Frieden/A Little Peace"	Nicole
19 June	"Ein Bißchen Frieden/A Little Peace"	Nicole
26 June	"Ein Bißchen Frieden/A Little Peace"	Nicole
3 July	"Ein Bißchen Frieden/A Little Peace"	Nicole
10 July	"Ebony and Ivory"	Paul McCartney & Stevie Wonder
17 July	"Ebony and Ivory"	Paul McCartney & Stevie Wonder
24 July	"Ebony and Ivory"	Paul McCartney & Stevie Wonder
31 July	"Da Da Da"	Trio
7 August	"Da Da Da"	Trio
14 August	"Ebony and Ivory"	Paul McCartney & Stevie Wonder
21 August	"Ebony and Ivory"	Paul McCartney & Stevie Wonder
28 August	"Abracadabra"	Steve Miller Band
4 September	"Just an Illusion"	Imagination
11 September	"Abracadabra"	Steve Miller Band
18 September	"Abracadabra"	Steve Miller Band
25 September	"Abracadabra"	Steve Miller Band
2 October	"Abracadabra"	Steve Miller Band
9 October	"Eye of the Tiger"	Survivor
16 October	"Eye of the Tiger"	Survivor
23 October	"Eye of the Tiger"	Survivor
30 October	"Words"	F. R. David
6 November	"Eye of the Tiger"	Survivor
13 November	"Words"	F. R. David
20 November	"Words"	F. R. David
27 November	"Words"	F. R. David
4 December	"Words"	F. R. David
11 December	"Words"	F. R. David
18 December	"Words"	F. R. David
25 December	"Words"	F. R. David
