= I Got Heaven =

Studio album by Mannequin Pussy
- Released: March 1, 2024
- Recorded: March 2023
- Studio: Steakhouse (Los Angeles)
- Genre: Punk rock; hardcore punk; pop punk; indie rock; bubblegrunge
- Length: 30:05
- Label: Epitaph
- Producer: John Congleton

Mannequin Pussy chronology
Perfect (2021)	I Got Heaven (2024)

"Patience was the aftermath of intense heartache. I Got Heaven is the longing for something new and exciting. There's a pervasive feeling of longing and horniness to it."

—Vocalist Marisa Dabice on the themes of I Got Heaven

I Got Heaven is the fourth studio album by American rock band Mannequin Pussy, released on March 1, 2024, through Epitaph Records. The album eschews the band's previous focus on love songs and political themes to explore issues related to personal relationships, religious themes, and emotions related to aging, inspired by art films, a break-up, and pigs. It was helmed by record producer John Congleton who approached the band to collaborate. The album was promoted with further live performances and single and music video releases. It has received widespread acclaim from critics.

Mannequin Pussy on tour for I Got Heaven in 2024
- Galleries from BrooklynVegan, Paste, The Philadelphia Inquirer, and Under the Radar
- Mannequin Pussy & Soul Glo raged at Brookyn Steel
- Mannequin Pussy & Soul Glo at Brooklyn Steel
- Philly's Mannequin Pussy and Soul Glo team up for a ferocious show at Union Transfer, complete with a room-quaking communal scream
- Mannequin Pussy @ Brooklyn Steel, Brooklyn, NYC, May 16, 2024

== Reception ==
Professional ratings
Aggregate scores
Source	Rating
AnyDecentMusic?	8.4/10
Metacritic	89/100
Review scores
Source	Rating
AllMusic	4.5/5 stars
Beats Per Minute	87%
DIY	4.5/5 stars
Kerrang!	4/5
The Line of Best Fit	8/10
Pitchfork	8.8/10
Rolling Stone	4/5 stars
Slant Magazine	4/5 stars
The Skinny	5/5 stars
Under the Radar	8.5/10

Editors at review aggregator AnyDecentMusic? scored this album an 8.4 out of 10, based on 16 critics' scores. According to the review aggregator Metacritic, I Got Heaven received "universal acclaim" based on a weighted average score of 89 out of 100 from 16 critic scores.

Editors at AllMusic rated this album 4.5 out of 5 stars, with critic Matt Collar writing "What if you could turn [being crushed by desire] outward, like a superpower?" and continued that this is "the palpable feeling running through... the blisteringly romantic and forceful fourth album from the Philly indie punk outfit Mannequin Pussy". In Dork, Kelsy McClure rated this album 4 out of 5 stars, calling it "another stellar release from Mannequin Pussy" that "feels like a living breathing thing". An interview with vocalist Marisa Dabice in The Fader, David Renshaw called this an "excellent" exploration of aging and a "collection of songs that rage and soothe in equal measure". In Kerrang!, Emma Wilkes rated I Got Heaven 4 out of 5 for being "punk at its most multifaceted and emotional, overflowing with desire and angst". Hayden Merrick of Loud and Quiet rated this album an 8 out of 10, writing that the band "has never sounded so red-hot and dynamic" due to John Congleton's production and characterized this as "a record acutely focused on impermanence". Elliott Burr of The Line of Best Fit scored I Got Heaven an 8 out of 10, praising Epitaph for allowing the band to express a 1990s alternative rock-influenced work that gives the band the opportunity to grow their audience. John Murphy of musicOMH scored this album 4 out of 5 stars, writing that it "never overstays its welcome" with "thrillingly visceral music that could bring Mannequin Pussy ever closer to crossover success".

In a profile for The New York Times, critic Marissa Lorusso called this music "10 tracks of defiant punk, buoyant power-pop and fuzzed-out rock anchored by [vocalist Marisa] Dabice's bold, often confrontational lyrics". Paste published a feature on Mannequin Pussy where Devon Chodzin praised the band's growth since their debut and how this release shows a variety of styles and the editors chose this as a Paste Pick where Victoria Wasylak scored it an 8.2 out of 10, characterizing it as "a collection of trenchant, pliable punk rock". Dan DeLuca in The Philadelphia Inquirer called this the band's best album yet and "their most compelling work". Editorial staff at Pitchfork chosen this for Best New Music and critic Sadie Sartini Garner rated it an 8.8 out of 10, calling it "an essential, wide-ranging record that's mouthy, messy, and self-assured" that mixes hardcore punk and pop music. At PopMatters, Brian Stout rated I Got Heaven an 8 out of 10, calling it "the sound of a group that have fully clicked and have fine-tuned their signature sound into another high point"; the site published a second review from Brandon Miller that was a 9 out of 10, where Miller states that this release "has a little bit for everyone", mixing pop and punk sounds.

In Rolling Stone, Maya Georgi called this album "a perfect mix of rage and longing" and praised the "lyrical prowess" on display. Writing for The Skinny, Tony Inglis scored I Got Heaven 5 out of 5 stars, writing that "the band's universal howl looks for a split in the darkness" as it mixes tenderness with dangerous circumstances in the lyrics and that it "ends with yearning and a desire for tenderness touched by the realisation that the world never quite lets you sink your teeth into it". Slant Magazine's Nick Seip gave this release 4 out of 5 stars for being "a balance of firebrand punk and intoxicating power pop" and "a musical expression of self-governance and all the pain and pleasure that comes with it". Spin's Matthew Neale scored I Got Heaven a B+, stating that some of the "diaristic... lovelorn charisma" in the band's previous music has been lost, but this is "a formidable document of their fire and fury—and one that's needed more than ever". Caleb Campbell of Under the Radar gave I Got Heaven an 8.5 out of 10, stating that it "perhaps signifies a more settled disposition for Mannequin Pussy, offering a synthesis of what came before and a hint of what comes after". Vulture published a profile of Mannequin Pussy where Quinn Moreland called this release "something extraordinary".

A review of the best albums of the first quarter of 2024 by BrooklynVegan saw Andrew Sacher calling this work "a record inspired by living with your loneliness and solitude and really getting to know yourself, and all the ups and downs and indecisiveness and contradictions that come along with that". At Consequence of Sound, a roundup of the favorite albums of March 2024 included this choice by Paolo Ragusa who stated that "tracking [Mannequin Pussy's] evolution... to this month's I Got Heaven is remarkable, because they've transformed into one of the very best rock bands around today, and their use of space and dynamics is wildly impressive" and on June 4, the site collected the best albums of the year so far, ranking this at 10 and Ben Kaye called the music "the thrashing, uncertain, self-aware hubris of longing". A May 1 review of the best music of 2024 from Pitchfork included this album. In a May 31 roundup of the best albums of the year, editors at Exclaim! ranked this 5, comparing the music to "a wild animal with an uncontrollable bloodlust, listening to it feels like licking a fresh, open wound clean". A June 3 roundup of the best albums of the year in Spin included I Got Heaven where Josh Chesler called it the band's "most diverse, complicated, messy and (arguably) meaningful" work. On June 4, Stereogum did a roundup of the best albums of the year so far and ranked this 6, with Danielle Chelosky stating that it "is a portrait of yearning". Staff at Billboard compiled a similar list on June 17 and Frank DiGiacomo included I Got Heaven, calling it a "fanged earworm of an album".

Prior to the album release, the title track received positive reviews. Editors at Pitchfork declared this one of the Best New Tracks and critic Nina Corcoran praised the combination of power pop and punk rock with the "song's abrasive verses yield[ing] to a sugary power-pop chorus—the combination of lush vocal harmonies and fuzzy guitar riffs recalling '90s acts like that dog. or Belly—it's akin to pressing your face against the air conditioner during a heat wave". At Stereogum, Tom Breihan called the track "a revved-up anthem that moves from stomp-scream fuzz-rock fury to twinkly shoegaze melody and back again" and compared its lyrics to Patti Smith. The title track was nominated for the Best Punk Record award at the 2024 Libera Awards.

=== Year-end lists ===
Select year-end rankings for I Got Heaven
Publication/critic	Accolade	Rank	Ref.
Exclaim!	50 Best Albums of 2024	6	
Rough Trade UK	Albums of the Year 2024	67	
Time Out	The Best Albums of 2024	9	

== Track listing ==
All lyrics are written by Marisa Dabice; all music is composed by Mannequin Pussy and John Congleton.

1. "I Got Heaven" – 2:59
2. "Loud Bark" – 3:04
3. "Nothing Like" – 4:09
4. "I Don't Know You" – 3:44
5. "Sometimes" – 3:28
6. "Ok? Ok! Ok? Ok!" – 2:11
7. "Softly" – 3:27
8. "Of Her" – 1:34
9. "Aching" – 1:28
10. "Split Me Open" – 4:01

== Personnel ==
Mannequin Pussy

- Marisa Dabice – vocals, guitar on "I Got Heaven", "Loud Bark", "Nothing Like", and "Softly"
- Kaleen Reading – drums, percussion
- Colins "Bear" Regisford – bass guitar, vocals on "Loud Bark", "Nothing Like", "I Don't Know You", "Sometimes", "Ok? Ok! Ok? Ok!", "Softly", "Of Her", and "Aching"
- Maxine Steen – guitar, synthesizer

Additional personnel

- Bone Design – layout
- Greg Calbi – mastering at Sterling Sound
- John Congleton – mixing, production
- Steve Fallone – mastering at Sterling Sound
- CJ Harvey – photography
- Ian Hurdle – photography
- Sam Madill – engineering
- Mason Mercer – creative direction
- Anthony Miralles – creative direction
- Macie Stewart – harmony vocals on "I Got Heaven" and "I Don't Know You", violin on "I Don't Know You", "Sometimes", and "Split Me Open"

== Charts ==
I Got Heaven entered the UK Album Sales Chart, peaking at #96, as well as the UK Album Downloads Chart (peaking at #39), the UK Record Store Chart (peaked at #36), the UK Independent Albums Chart (peaked at #31), and the UK Independent Album Breakers Chart (peaked at #10).

== See also ==
- 2024 in American music
- 2024 in rock music
- List of 2024 albums
