= Karl Brazil =

- Born: Karl Peter Brazil; 27 May 1977 (age 49); Solihull, West Midlands, England
- Instruments: Drums

Karl Peter Brazil (born 27 May 1977, Solihull) is an English session drummer.

He is best known as the studio and touring drummer for James Blunt and for Robbie Williams. He also serves as musical director for Robbie Williams and 5 Seconds Of Summer. In 2009 he joined Feeder, replacing previous drummer Mark Richardson. An accomplished session player, he often works with many other pop and rock artists, both on tour and in the studio.

== Biography ==
Born in Solihull, Brazil was raised in a musical family, and was influenced by them at a young age. His father played in bands whilst Karl was growing up and he often cites his father's record collection as his main motivation for getting involved in music.

Karl is left-handed and left-footed but plays on a right-handed drum kit leading with his left hand. He can play left-handed but chooses not to, as he started drumming so young and his father had initially set up his drums in a right-handed layout.

== Personal life ==
Born in Solihull, he currently resides in Birmingham with his family

== Instruments ==
Brazil currently uses Gretsch drums, Zildjian cymbals, Roland electronic drums, Remo drumheads, DW hardware LP percussion and Vic Firth drumsticks.

== Associated acts ==
- Feeder
- James Blunt
- Take That
- Robbie Williams
- Leona Lewis
- Natalie Imbruglia
- Girls Aloud
- Elton John
- Westlife
- Jason Mraz
- James Morrison
- Ben's Brother
- Paloma Faith
- Starsailor
- Olly Murs
- Alison Moyet

== Discography ==
- Some Kind of Trouble – James Blunt
- All The Lost Souls – James Blunt
- Renegades – Feeder
- All Bright Electric – Feeder
- Torpedo – Feeder
- Tallulah – Feeder
- Black/Red – Feeder
- Britpop – Robbie Williams
- From the Dark - Tony Iommi
