= Words (F. R. David song) =

Single by F. R. David

from the album Words
- B-side: "When the Sun Goes Down"
- Released: 1982
- Genre: Synth-pop; Europop
- Length: 3:31
- Label: Carrere
- Composer: Robert Fitoussi
- Lyricists: Louis Sandy Yaguda (Sandy Deanne), Martin Joe Kupersmith (Marty Sanders)
- Producer: Frédéric Leibovitz

F. R. David singles chronology
"Black Jack" (1981)	"Words" (1982)	"Pick Up the Phone" (1983)

"Words" is a song by F. R. David, released as a single in 1982 from his same-named debut album. The song was a huge European hit, peaking at number one in West Germany, Switzerland, Spain, Italy, Sweden, Austria, Denmark, Ireland, Belgium, and Norway. In early 1983, it peaked at number two on the UK Singles Chart, and it also went to number one in South Africa in late 1982, spending 25.5 weeks on the charts, eventually becoming the most successful hit on that country's year-end chart. In Australia, the single peaked at number 12 and spent 41 weeks within the top 100 in two chart runs throughout 1983 and early 1984.

In 2006, David released a French language duet version of the song with singer Winda Sylviana, entitled "Words, J'aime ces Mots," the pair also recorded an English duet version entitled "Words."

The song is on the Call Me by Your Name soundtrack.

== Track listings ==
7-inch single

1. "Words" – 3:31
2. "When the Sun Goes Down" – 3:59

12-inch maxi

1. "Words" – 3:31
2. "When the Sun Goes Down" – 3:08

12-inch Maxi Single (Mexico) • 1983

1. Contesta El Telefono = Pick Up The Phone - 5:10
2. Palabras = Words - 4:59

== Charts ==
=== Weekly charts ===
==== Original version ====
Chart (1982–1983)	Peak position
Australia (Kent Music Report)	12
Austria (Ö3 Austria Top 40)	1
Belgium (Ultratop 50 Flanders)	1
Canada Adult Contemporary (RPM)	9
Denmark (IFPI)	1
Europe (Eurochart Hot 100)	1
Finland (Suomen virallinen lista)	1
France (IFOP)	2
Iceland (Dagblaðið Vísir)	5
Ireland (IRMA)	1
Italy (Musica e dischi)	1
Japan (Oricon Singles Chart)	57
Netherlands (Dutch Top 40)	2
Netherlands (Single Top 100)	2
New Zealand (Recorded Music NZ)	7
Norway (VG-lista)	1
Portugal (AFP)	1
South Africa (Springbok Radio)	1
Spain (AFYVE)	1
Sweden (Sverigetopplistan)	1
Switzerland (Schweizer Hitparade)	1
UK Singles (Official Charts)	2
US Billboard Hot 100	62
West Germany (GfK)	1

Chart (2026)	Peak position
Norway Airplay (IFPI Norge)	72

==== "Words (Remix '97)" ====
Chart (1997)	Peak position
Finland (Suomen virallinen lista)	19

==== "Words '99" ====
Chart (1999)	Peak position
France (SNEP)	27

=== Year-end charts ===
Chart (1982)	Position
Belgium (Ultratop 50 Flanders)	1
France (IFOP)	10
Netherlands (Dutch Top 40)	12
Netherlands (Single Top 100)	17
Switzerland (Schweizer Hitparade)	1
West Germany (Media Control)	47

Chart (1983)	Position
Australia (Kent Music Report)	49
South Africa (Springbok Radio)	1
West Germany (Media Control)	42

== Certifications and sales ==
Region	Certification	Certified units/sales
France	—	1,000,000
Germany (BVMI)	Platinum	1,000,000^{^}
^{^} Shipments figures based on certification alone.

== See also ==
- List of European number-one hits of 1982
- List of number-one hits of 1982 (Germany)
- List of number-one singles of 1983 (Ireland)
- List of number-one hits (Italy)
- List of number-one singles of 1982 (Spain)
- List of number-one singles and albums in Sweden
- List of number-one singles of the 1980s (Switzerland)
- VG-lista 1964 to 1994
