= Mannequin Pussy (album) =

- The original cover to the album with the title Gypsy Pervert

Studio album by Mannequin Pussy
- Released: September 9, 2014
- Genre: Punk rock
- Length: 18:23
- Language: English
- Label: Rarebit Records, Tiny Engines
- Producer: Mannequin Pussy; D. A. Stern

Mannequin Pussy chronology
Meatslave (2011)	Mannequin Pussy (2014)	Romantic (2016)

Mannequin Pussy (formerly known as Gypsy Pervert) is the debut full-length studio album by American punk rock band Mannequin Pussy.

== Reception ==
Writing for The Big Takeover, Cody Conrad noted "a rare urgency to their music" and stated that this "can be a difficult album to listen to, but that’s part of the reason it’s so great". Renaldo69 of PunkNews made this a staff pick and praised the mix of genres on this album and called the music a "whirlwind of tracks". A brief profile for TinyMixTapes by Art Ivan summed up that "the kids’ll love it" for being able to switch between moods and tones. Frank Valish of Under the Radar called Mannequin Pussy one of the overlooked albums of 2014, commenting on the album's intensity that "the songs hit you over the head like an anvil and pummel with a ferocity and ferociousness that will force you to submit", but noting that repeated spins will reward listeners with diverse music that includes "girl-group melodies, shoegaze-y haze, and metal fuzz".

== Track listing ==
All music written by Marisa Dabice and Athanasios Paul, all lyrics by Marisa Dabice.

1. "Sneaky" – 1:43
2. "My Baby (Axe Nice)" – 0:59
3. "Clue Juice" – 1:19
4. "Clit Eastwood" – 1:55
5. "Someone Like You" – 2:08
6. "Terror, No!" – 1:24
7. "Meatslave 2" – 3:27
8. "Meatslave 3" – 0:41
9. "Sheet City" – 1:31
10. "Pissdrinker" – 3:16

== Personnel ==
Mannequin Pussy

- Drew Adler – drums, production
- Marisa "Dabeast" Dabice – guitar, vocals, production
- Thanasi Paul – guitar, production

Additional personnel

- Dave Eck – mastering
- Andre Kelman – recording
- Jonny Schenke – mixing
- Perry Shall – artwork
- D. A. Stern – production

== See also ==
- List of 2014 albums
