= Funeral Soundtrack No. 4 =

Studio album by Destroy Boys
- Released: August 9, 2024
- Recorded: 2021–2023
- Studios: Sunset Sound; Music Friends
- Genres: Punk rock; hardcore punk
- Length: 30:49
- Label: Hopeless
- Producer: Carlos de la Garza

Destroy Boys chronology
Open Mouth, Open Heart (2021)	Funeral Soundtrack No. 4 (2024)	Foie Gras (2027)

Singles from Funeral Soundtrack No. 4
- 1. "Beg for Torture" Released: April 6, 2023; 2. "Shadow (I'm Breaking Down)" Released: July 13, 2023; 3. "Plucked" Released: March 13, 2024; 4. "Boyfeel" Released: June 6, 2024; 5. "Should've Been Me" Released: July 18, 2024; 6. "You Hear Yes" Released: August 8, 2024

Funeral Soundtrack No. 4 (stylized as Funeral Soundtrack #4) is the fourth studio album by American rock band, Destroy Boys. The album was released on August 9, 2024, through Hopeless Records.

== Background and recording ==
The title Funeral Soundtrack #4 was conceived by guitarist and backing vocalist Violet Mayugba during a tour in Europe. The name was chosen to reflect the album's thematic focus on pivotal life events, including the birth and death of significant adult challenges. The album took approximately two years to complete, making it the longest production period for any Destroy Boys album to date. The band has described this record as their "post-pandemic album," reflecting the challenges and realities of life after the COVID-19 pandemic.

The album was produced by Carlos de la Garza, marking the first collaboration between Destroy Boys and de la Garza. His involvement introduced a pop sensibility to the band's music, contributing to a more mainstream sound while retaining the band's punk roots. The album also features collaborations with Kat Moss of Scowl and Missy Dabice of Mannequin Pussy on the track "You Hear Yes."

== Music style and influence ==
Funeral Soundtrack #4 represents a significant stylistic shift for Destroy Boys. While their first two albums were characterized by a traditional punk rock sound, this album explores more diverse and complex musical landscapes. Bassist David Orozco noted that the album showcases the band's versatility and includes a wider range of sonic textures than their previous work. Thematically, the album deals with mature and introspective topics, reflecting the band members' personal growth and life experiences.

== Promotion and release ==
The band began releasing singles from Funeral Soundtrack #4 in 2023, prior to the album's official announcement. The lead single, "Beg For the Torture", was followed by others, including "Shadow (I'm Breaking Down)" and "Should've Been Me". The music video for "Should've Been Me" was heavily influenced by psychological horror films, a genre that guitarist Violet Mayugba has a personal interest in.

== Critical reception ==
Professional ratings
Review scores
Source	Rating
Clunk	4/5 stars
Distorted Sound	8/10
Kerrang!	4/5 stars
Louder	4/5 stars
Narc.	4.5/5 stars

Funeral Soundtrack #4 received praise from contemporary music critics. Writing for Distorted Sound, Louis Suffill gave the album four stars out of five saying Destroy Boys' "latest album seems to walk the line between serious punk rock and just for fun scrappy punk tracks but also has some more heartfelt tenderness at its core. It's hard to put this band into any one box but whatever box they could end up in it has to be a good one". Felix Bartlett, writing for Clunk Magazine & Amped Magazine also praised the album saying in his four out of five review that the album "presents itself as arguably the most fun funeral ever (morbid but true). On their fourth outing Destroy Boys continue to defy expectations delivering on a serious but also playful punk rock album that packs a serious punch".

Maddy Howell, writing for Louder, conceded that Funeral Soundtrack #4 "isn't exactly a rallying cry for a better world", although Howell said that "if they can't make any promises to solve the world's problems, their snarky punk melodies certainly offer a welcome break from the chaos".

== Track listing ==
All tracks are written by Alexia Roditis, Violet Mayugba, Narsai Malik, and Carlos de la Garza.

No.	Title	Length
1.	"Bad Guy"	2:43
2.	"Plucked"	3:12
3.	"Beg for the Torture"	1:26
4.	"Praying"	4:05
5.	"Amor divino"	3:03
6.	"Shadow (I'm Breaking Down)"	3:39
7.	"Shedding Skin"	2:54
8.	"Should've Been Me"	1:03
9.	"You Don't Know"	3:30
10.	"You Hear Yes" (featuring Mannequin Pussy and Scowl)	2:44
11.	"Boyfeel"	2:30
Total length:		30:49

== Personnel ==
Destroy Boys

- Alexia Roditis
- Violet Mayugba
- David Orozco
- Narsai Malik

Additional contributors

- Carlos de la Garza – production, mixing, recording, additional instrumentation
- Dave Collins – mastering
- Harriet Tam – additional engineering
- Mike Fasano – drum technician
