= Perfect (Mannequin Pussy EP) =

EP by Mannequin Pussy
- Released: May 21, 2021
- Recorded: August 2020–February 2021
- Genre: Pop-punk; punk rock
- Label: Epitaph Records
- Producer: Will Yip; Grave Goods (additional)

Mannequin Pussy chronology
Patience (2019)	Perfect (2021)	I Got Heaven (2024)

Perfect is the second EP by punk rock trio Mannequin Pussy, released through Epitaph Records in May 2021. It sees Will Yip returning as producer and engineer after working on their 2019 album Patience.

== Composition ==
Perfect sees the trio working in "swooning" balladry, "glistening" pop rock and "scathing" punk rock. It also works in pop-punk like that on Patience.

== Critical reception ==
Professional ratings
Aggregate scores
Source	Rating
Metacritic	80/100
Review scores
Source	Rating
Clash	8/10
Beats Per Minute	80%
Pitchfork	7.2/10

Perfect received acclaim from music critics. On Metacritic, it holds a score of 80 out of 100, indicating "generally favorable reviews", based on six reviews.

== Track listing ==
No.	Title	Writer(s)	Length
1.	"Control"		3:15
2.	"Perfect"		1:22
3.	"To Lose You"		3:06
4.	"Pigs Is Pigs"	Colins Regisford	1:56
5.	"Darling"		4:10

== Personnel ==
All credits adapted from the EP's Bandcamp page.

Mannequin Pussy

- Marisa "Missy" Dabice – vocals, guitars (rhythm and lead), synths (all songs)
- Kaleen Reading – drums and percussion (1–4)
- Colins "Bear" Regisford – bass, vocals (1–4)
- Thanasi Paul – guitar (rhythm and lead), piano (1–4)

Additional musicians

- Desiree Dabice – harmonies (1, 3, 5)
- Will Yip – drum production (5)

Technical

- Will Yip – engineering, production
- Grave Goods – additional production, sounds
