= Destroy Boys =

American punk rock band

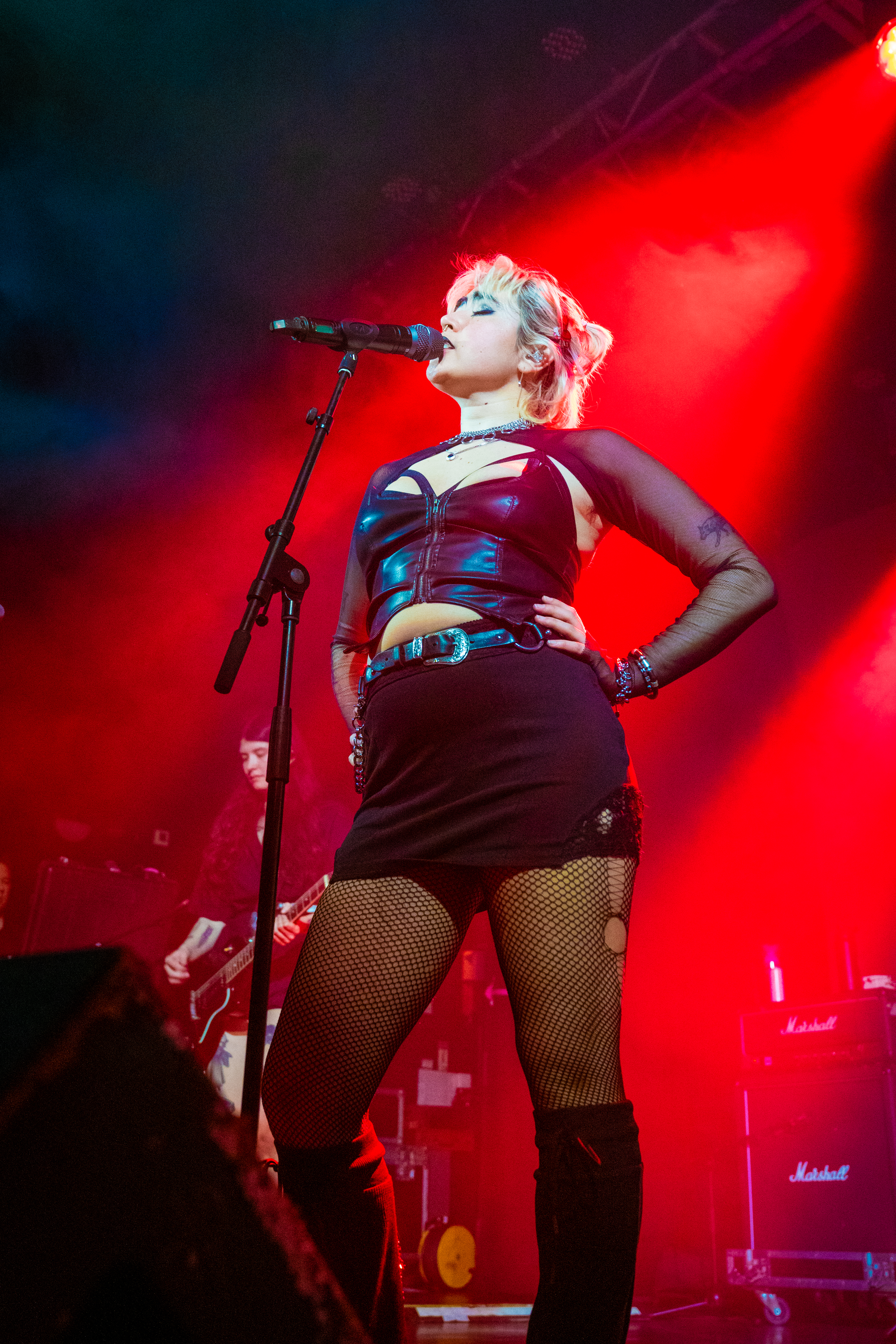
- Alexia Roditis of Destroy Boys performing at the Electric Ballroom in London in 2025

Background information
- Origin: Sacramento, California, U.S.
- Genres: Punk rock; garage punk; hardcore punk
- Years active: 2015–present
- Labels: Uncool; Hopeless; Epitaph; 1-2-3-4 Go!
- Members: Alexia Roditis; Violet Mayugba; Narsai Malik; David Orozco
- Past members: Ethan Knight; Enzo Malaspina; Chris Malaspina; Abe Cunningham; Blake Eitel; Donnie Walsh
- Website: destroydestroyboys.com

Destroy Boys are an American punk rock band formed in Sacramento, California, in 2015. In 2017, they were nominated for awards in the 25th Sacramento Area Music Awards in the categories "New Artist", "Punk/post-punk" and "Teen" and in 2018 was the highest-voted contestant in Do The Bay's contest to play Noise Pop Festival. Their second album Make Room was included in Maximumrocknroll's top 10 albums of 2018.

== History ==
The band was formed by Roditis and Mayugba on October 6, 2015, as an acoustic project, intending for Roditis to play drums and Mayugba to sing and play guitar. Their name was taken from the words that Mayugba wrote on her chalkboard at home during a period of relationship troubles. They released their debut EP "Mom Jeans" digitally in 2015 with Roditis singing and Mayugba on acoustic guitar. Not long after, Knight's mother said she would not continue paying for his drums lesson unless he joined a band, leading to him contacting Mayugba, whom he knew as the child of Phallucy guitarist Sonny Mayugba and the Skirts vocalist Lynn Mayugba. She replied by sending him their EP, which he was impressed by, leading to him joining the group, and Mayugba moving onto electric guitar.

On April 6, 2016, via their former record label "donut warriors", they released the EP "Grimester", their first release with Knight. On February 4, 2017, they released two singles, "Methatonin" and "Gold Medal". Enzo Malaspina of Mt. Eddy joined the band briefly in 2017, as a bass player, recording on their second album and performing with them live, later joined by his brother Chris on drums, after Knight's departure They were nominated for awards in the 2017 Sacramento Area Music Awards in the categories "New Artist", "Punk/post-punk" and "Teen". On February 4, 2018, they played at Submerge magazine's tenth-anniversary show, along with Sam I Jam, Horseneck and Screature. On April 6, 2018, they released the singles "Crybaby" and "Vixen", around this time Roditis began playing rhythm guitar live for the band. In June 2018 they released the fifth single, "American River" from their second album opened for Sons of an Illustrious Father at a sold-out gig at Chicago's Schubas venue, and opened for The Regrettes on their "Come Through" North American tour. On October 27, they played at the UC Theatre for Uncool Halloween III, with SWMRS, Bleached, Beach Goons, Mt. Eddy and Small Crush. On September 27, they released the sixth single, "Soundproof", from their second album "Make Room", for which they announced the information at the same time. "Make Room" was released on October 19, 2018, with Joey Armstrong and Chris Malaspina sharing drum duties and Cole Becker and Enzo Malaspina sharing bass duties.

On January 24, 2020, they released the single "Fences", followed on April 23, 2020, by "Honey I'm Home". On February 17, 2021, the band made their debut on Hopeless Records with the single "Muzzle", which appeared on their third LP Open Mouth, Open Heart on October 8 of the same year.

Their fourth studio album, Funeral Soundtrack #4, released on August 8, 2024. The lead single, "Boyfeel", was released on June 6, 2024, along with an announcement of the upcoming album.

== Musical style and influence ==
The band's musical style has been categorized as punk rock, garage punk, hardcore punk, garage rock, rock and roll and riot grrrl. They cite influences including 1980s punk rock bands like Operation Ivy, the Misfits, as well as contemporary musical groups like Dog Party and much of the Uncool Records line-up, in addition to Against Me, The Who, The Garden, Sleater-Kinney, Lady Gaga, Mannequin Pussy, Deftones, the Distillers, Black Sabbath and the Police. The San Francisco Chronicle described them as "equal parts hardcore and fun", while having self-described their sound as "What would happen if Blondie stumbled into a Misfits recording session". Roditis says their biggest influences vocally are Siouxsie Sioux from Siouxsie and the Banshees, Brooks Nielsen from The Growlers and Ezra Koenig from Vampire Weekend.

Despite their frequent comparisons to riot grrrl bands like Bikini Kill, the members of the band deny any associations with it, saying that they love the genre, but they shouldn't be categorized as it just because they're female-fronted.

== Members ==
Current

- Alexia Roditis – lead vocals (2015–present), rhythm guitar (2018–present)
- Violet Mayugba – lead guitar, backing vocals (2015–present)
- Narsai Malik – drums (2018–present)
- David Orozco – bass (2021–present)

Past

- Ethan Knight – drums (2015–2018)
- Enzo Malaspina – bass (2017)
- Chris Malaspina – drums (2017–2018)
- Abe Cunningham – drums (2018)
- Blake Eitel – bass (2018)
- Donnie Walsh – bass (2017, 2018–2019)

Timeline

== Discography ==
Studio albums

- Sorry, Mom (2016)
- Make Room (2018)
- Open Mouth, Open Heart (2021)
- Funeral Soundtrack #4 (2024)
- FOIE GRAS (2027)

EPs

- Mom Jeans (2015)
- Grimester (2016)
- Destroy Boys on Audiotree Live (2019)

Singles

- "Methatonin" (2017)
- "Gold Medal" (2017)
- "Crybaby" (2018)
- "Vixen" (2018)
- "American River" (2018)
- "Soundproof" (2018)
- "Fences" (2020)
- "Honey I'm Home" (2020)
- "Muzzle" (2021)
- "Drink" (2021)
- "Locker Room Bully" (2021)
- "All This Love" (2021)
- "Escape" (2021)
- "Beg for the Torture" (2023)
- "Shadow (I'm Breaking Down)" (2023) (No. 38 Billboard Alternative Airplay chart)
- "Plucked" (2024)
- "Boyfeel" (2024)
- "Should've Been Me" (2024)
