= Words (F. R. David album) =

Studio album by F. R. David
- Released: 1982
- Genre: Soft rock; Eurobeat; synth-pop
- Length: 34:55
- Label: Carrere
- Producer: Frédéric Leibovitz; Jean-Michel Gallois-Montbrun

F. R. David chronology
Words (1982)	Long Distance Flight (1984)

Words is the debut studio album by French singer F. R. David. Its title track, "Words", was a commercial success in Europe, reaching number one in ten countries across the continent, as well as peaking at No. 2 in the United Kingdom, France and Netherlands.

== Track listing ==
Side one
No.	Title	Writer(s)	Length
1.	"Words"	Robert Fitoussi	3:31
2.	"Someone to Love"	Fitoussi; Daniel Darras; Richelle Dassin	3:28
3.	"Take Me Back"	Fitoussi; Darras	3:55
4.	"Pick Up the Phone"	Fitoussi; Dassin	4:00
5.	"Music"	Frédéric Leibovitz; Darras; Sam Choueka	3:13

Side two
No.	Title	Writer(s)	Length
6.	"Rocker Blues"	Fitoussi; Dassin	3:35
7.	"Givin' It Up"	Fitoussi; Denis Pépin	3:19
8.	"He"	Fitoussi; Pépin	3:13
9.	"Porcelain Eyes"	Fitoussi; Darras	2:41
10.	"Can't Get Enough"	Fitoussi; Pépin	4:00
Total length:			34:55

== Personnel ==
- F. R. David: Rhythm guitar, vocals
- Patrice Tison: Lead guitar
- Daniel Darras: Keyboards, saxophone
- Gilles Douieb, Michel Assa: Bass
- Benjamin Cohen, Roger Rizzitelli: Electronic drums
- Joël Fajerman: Drum programming

== Production ==
- Arranged by F.R. David, Daniel Darras and Frédéric Leibovitz
- Produced by Jean-Michel Gallois-Montbrun and Frédéric Leibovitz
- Engineered by Daniel Darras
- Mixed by Dominique Poncet
- Design, photography – Richard Charpagne

== Charts ==
Chart performance for Words
Chart (1982–1983)	Peak position
Finnish Albums (Suomen virallinen lista)	2
German Albums (Offizielle Top 100)	13
Norwegian Albums (VG-lista)	1
Swedish Albums (Sverigetopplistan)	3
UK Albums (OCC)	46
