= Black/Red =

Studio album by Feeder
- Released: 5 April 2024
- Recorded: 2022–2023
- Studio: The Treehouse
- Genre: Alternative rock
- Length: 31:45 (Black); 34:19 (Red); 66:04 (Full album)
- Label: Big Teeth; Townsend
- Producer: Grant Nicholas; Tim Roe

Feeder chronology
Torpedo (2022)	Black/Red (2024)

Singles from Black/Red
- 1. "Playing with Fire" / "ELF" Released: 23 October 2023; 2. "The Knock" / "Soldiers of Love" Released: 24 November 2023; 3. "Lost in the Wilderness" Released: 8 February 2024; 4. "Hey You" Released: 29 March 2024; 5. "Unconditional" / "Scream" Released: 23 August 2024; 6. "Here Comes the Hurricane" / "Submarine" Released: 30 August 2024

Black/Red is the twelfth studio album by Welsh rock band Feeder, released on 5 April 2024 via Big Teeth Music, Townsend Music and Absolute Label Services. A double album, it completes a trilogy that began with its predecessor, 2022's Torpedo.

== Background ==
Lead singer, songwriter and guitarist Grant Nicholas has said that the decision to release the record as a double album was made with the listener in mind, describing it as "almost like a musical production with an interval." He also described writing the album as a "musical pilgrimage" and a "labour of love", which resulted in a record of "undeniable Feeder".

Nicholas stated that "The Knock" is a "song about a highway or road of life and the journey in which it can take us on and the challenges we face along the way". In addition, he said that he had "a very clear visual image for "Soldiers of Love", almost like a film soundtrack. It's the first time we've recorded bagpipes on a Feeder track as we felt they would add to the slight Celtic feel of the song. It was originally going to stay more of an acoustic style track but I felt the song could be more cinematic and grander sonically."

The album was supported by a tour of the United Kingdom through March of 2024. It began on 2 March at the Junction in Cambridge and ended on 28 March at the Roundhouse in London.

== Reception ==
The album debuted at No.8 in the UK album charts with first week consumption figures of just over 7,300. In most weeks this would have guaranteed a top 5 entry, but ended up releasing in one of the most busiest sales weeks of the year, in which the top 17 albums all had figures of at least 5,000; the first time in 16 weeks at the time.

The tour in support of the album was also one of the band's longest and best-selling.

== Track listing ==
All tracks are written by Grant Nicholas.

Black
No.	Title	Length
1.	"Droids"	1:06
2.	"ELF"	3:58
3.	"Playing with Fire"	3:23
4.	"Vultures"	3:47
5.	"Sahara"	4:54
6.	"Hey You"	3:36
7.	"The Knock"	3:32
8.	"Perfume"	3:46
9.	"AI Man"	3:43
Total length:		31:45

Red
No.	Title	Length
1.	"Sleeping Dogs Lie"	3:53
2.	"Scream"	3:48
3.	"Submarine"	4:05
4.	"Lost in the Wilderness"	3:25
5.	"Memory Loss"	3:57
6.	"Unconditional"	3:08
7.	"Here Comes the Hurricane"	3:34
8.	"Soldiers of Love"	4:11
9.	"Ghosts on Parade"	4:18
Total length:		34:19

== Personnel ==
Feeder

- Grant Nicholas – vocals, guitars, keyboards, percussion, production and string arrangements
- Taka Hirose – bass

Additional personnel

- Geoff Holroyde – drums on "Hey You", "The Knock", "Perfume", "AI Man", "Sleeping Dogs Lie", "Scream", "Memory Loss", "Unconditional" and "Soldiers of Love"
- Karl Brazil – drums on "ELF", "Playing With Fire", "Vultures", "Sahara", "Submarine", Lost in the Wilderness", "Here Comes the Hurricane" and "Ghosts on Parade"
- Brian Sperber – keyboards on "Ghosts on Parade"
- Steve Pearce – bagpipes on "Soldiers of Love"
- Chris Sheldon – mixing
- Tim Roe – production, engineering, string arrangements, and mixing for "Droids", "Here Comes the Hurricane", "Soldiers of Love" and "Ghosts on Parade"
- Artwork – Mikey Eaton, Serg Nehaev
- Cover Art - Mikey Eaton

== Charts ==
Chart performance for Black/Red
Chart (2024)	Peak position
Scottish Albums (OCC)	5
UK Albums (OCC)	8
UK Independent Albums (OCC)	2
