= Romantic (album) =

Studio album by Mannequin Pussy
- Released: October 28, 2016
- Studio: Big Mamas Recording, Philadelphia, Pennsylvania, US
- Genre: Punk rock
- Length: 17:12
- Language: English
- Label: Tiny Engines

Mannequin Pussy chronology
| Mannequin Pussy (2014) | Romantic (2016) | Mannequin Pussy on Audiotree Live (2017) |

Over the past two years, I’ve finally started to feel way less depressed and more emotionally in control. I’ve taken a more “zen” attitude towards things that are thrown at me that I can’t control. This album was a way to confront lingering feelings I deal with on the daily, while also, for the first time, become truly aware of those same feelings—insecurity, doubt, depression, anxiety—that I see in some of the people I’m closest to. It took almost 29 years to realize that I’m not alone in how I’ve been feeling, and it was up to me to just be honest about that all along.

—Vocalist Marisa Dabice on writing songs for Romantic

Romantic is the second studio album by American punk rock band Mannequin Pussy.

== Reception ==
Writing for The A.V. Club, Zoe Camp rated this release an A−, calling it "an uptick in Mannequin Pussy’s caustic potential" with the addition of new band members that includes a blend of Crass-style hardcore punk as well as "pop bliss". Two critics at NPR gave a spotlight to this music: Lars Gotrich of First Listen called the album "wildly diverse and cathartic" that expresses a variety of emotions across several rock music genres and Marissa Lorusso chose the title track for Songs We Love for the combination of "instrumental muscle" and "surprisingly vulnerable poetry". Pitchfork's Raymond Cummings rated Romantic a 7.6 out of 10, stating that a "wild energy animates" the music and opining that this music gels better as an album than their previous release. At Punknews.org, Renaldo69 made this a staff pick and stated that this is "a record that wanders more fleshed-out and diverse territory with a bigger, angst-filled story to tell", building upon the band's full-length debut. Editors at Rolling Stone named "Romantic" the 14th-best song of the year. At Stereogum, the editorial staff chose this for album of the week, with critic Tom Breihan calling it "an album that just blasts along, never taking a moment to pause for breath" and comparing the music to Blonde Redhead, Helium, Minor Threat, and Sonic Youth. At Uproxx, Caitlin White declared this the tenth best album of the month, stating that the "oscillation between hardcore interludes, pop punk riffs, and softly-sung choruses is so cathartic".

== Track listing ==
All songs written by Marisa Dabice, Thanasi Paul, Kaleen Reading, and Bear Regisford, all lyrics by Marisa Dabice.

1. "Kiss" – 1:16
2. "Romantic" – 2:40
3. "Ten" – 0:58
4. "Emotional High" – 1:27
5. "Pledge" – 1:20
6. "Denial" – 1:58
7. "Everything" – 1:21
8. "Anything" – 2:02
9. "Meatslave One" – 0:56
10. "Hey, Steven" – 1:55
11. "Beside Yourself" – 1:19

== Personnel ==
Mannequin Pussy

- Marisa Dabice – guitar, vocals, recording, mixing
- Thanasi Paul – lead guitar, recording, mixing
- Kaleen Reading – drums, recording, mixing
- Colins "Bear" Regisford – bass guitar, recording, mixing

Additional personnel

- Dan Angel – painting
- Chris "Doc" Baglivo – recording, mixing
- Evan Bernard – recording
- Ryan Schwabe – mastering
- Perry Shall – layout, design

== See also ==
- 2016 in American music
- List of 2016 albums
