= Torpedo (album) =

Studio album by Feeder
- Released: 18 March 2022
- Recorded: 2020–2021
- Genres: Alternative rock; indie rock; grunge
- Length: 45:28
- Label: Big Teeth
- Producers: Grant Nicholas; Tim Roe

Feeder chronology
| Tallulah (2019) | Torpedo (2022) | Black/Red (2024) |

Singles from Torpedo
- 1. "Torpedo" Released: 25 August 2021; 2. "Magpie" Released: 24 September 2021; 3. "Wall of Silence" Released: 29 October 2021; 4. "The Healing" Released: 28 January 2022

Professional ratings
Review scores
| Source | Rating |
|---|---|
| Clash | 6/10 |
| Classic Rock | 4/5 stars |
| Gigwise | 8/10 stars |
| Kerrang! | 4/5 |
| Rock 'N' Load | 9/10 |

Torpedo is the eleventh studio album by Welsh rock band Feeder, released on 18 March 2022 through Big Teeth Music.

== Background and writing ==
In August 2019, Feeder released their tenth studio album, Tallulah. The album was a commercial success - debuting at number 4 on the UK Official Charts Company albums chart, it was the bands first album in almost fifteen years to crack to the top five of the chart. Feeling motivated, band members Grant Nicholas and Taka Hirose immediately began work on a follow-up album. The two wrote and recorded an album's worth of material across late 2019 and early 2020, with the album being largely completely outside of final audio mixing. However, progress halted with the onset of the COVID-19 pandemic in early 2020. Frustrated, Nicholas and Hirose turned to writing further material instead. Early sessions written during the COVID lockdown were slow, with Nicholas suffering with a case of writer's block. Eventually, his pent up frustration with both the state of the world, and his writer's block, lead to an outpouring of content, enough for two album's worth of material. The material was separated into two batches; the material written second - during the COVID lockdown - was put together to make up the Torpedo album while the earlier, pre-COVID, material was used for the following album, Black/Red.

== Themes and composition ==
Thematically, the album was influenced by the band's frustrations of the COVID-19 pandemic. This resulted in the album being described by publications as retaining their established melodic rock sound, but having a heavier and darker sound, punctuated with more distorted and fuzzy guitar riffs. Nicholas noted that the title track, "Torpedo", encapsulated the album well—darker verses of emotion and frustration leading into a chorus more centred around coming to a more positive conclusion from it. The album opens up with the six-minute track "The Healing", which Nicholas states he wrote to resemble something out of a rock opera, was meant to be heard as a wake up call for people to come together and work towards a better future. "Magpie" was described as an indie rock song about hope and optimism.

== Release and promotion ==
The album's title and release date—Torpedo and 18 March 2022—was announced well in advance of release in August 2021. A UK tour was also announced to begin shortly after the album's release. The album's heavier sound has led the band to plan a heavier set list for the tour as well. The album's title track was released at the time of the album's announcement as the first single. Songs "Wall of Silence", "Magpie", and "The Healing" were also released ahead of the album.

== Commercial performance ==
Torpedo entered the U.K. album chart at No.5, making it the band's fifth top 5 album and tenth top 10.

== Track listing ==
Torpedo track listing
| No. | Title | Length |
|---|---|---|
| 1. | "The Healing" | 6:08 |
| 2. | "Torpedo" | 3:44 |
| 3. | "When It All Breaks Down" | 4:15 |
| 4. | "Magpie" | 3:51 |
| 5. | "Hide and Seek" | 3:25 |
| 6. | "Decompress" | 3:39 |
| 7. | "Wall of Silence" | 3:32 |
| 8. | "Slow Strings" | 4:54 |
| 9. | "Born to Love You" | 3:27 |
| 10. | "Submission" | 4:33 |
| 11. | "Desperate Hour" | 4:00 |
| Total length: | | 45:28 |

== Personnel ==
Feeder

- Grant Nicholas – vocals, guitars, keyboards, percussion, arrangements
- Taka Hirose – bass

Additional musicians

- Karl Brazil – drums (tracks 1, 3, 5, 7, 8, 9)
- Geoff Holroyde – drums (2, 4, 6, 10), percussion (7, 11)
- Tim Rice – string arrangements, keyboards (1, 5, 8, 10)
- Brian Sperber – keyboards (10)

== Charts ==
Chart performance for Torpedo
| Chart (2022) | Peak position |
|---|---|
| Belgian Albums (Ultratop Flanders) | 181 |
| Scottish Albums (Official Charts) | 3 |
| UK Albums (Official Charts) | 5 |
| UK Independent Albums (Official Charts) | 1 |
| UK Rock & Metal Albums (Official Charts) | 1 |
