= Les Variations =

French rock band

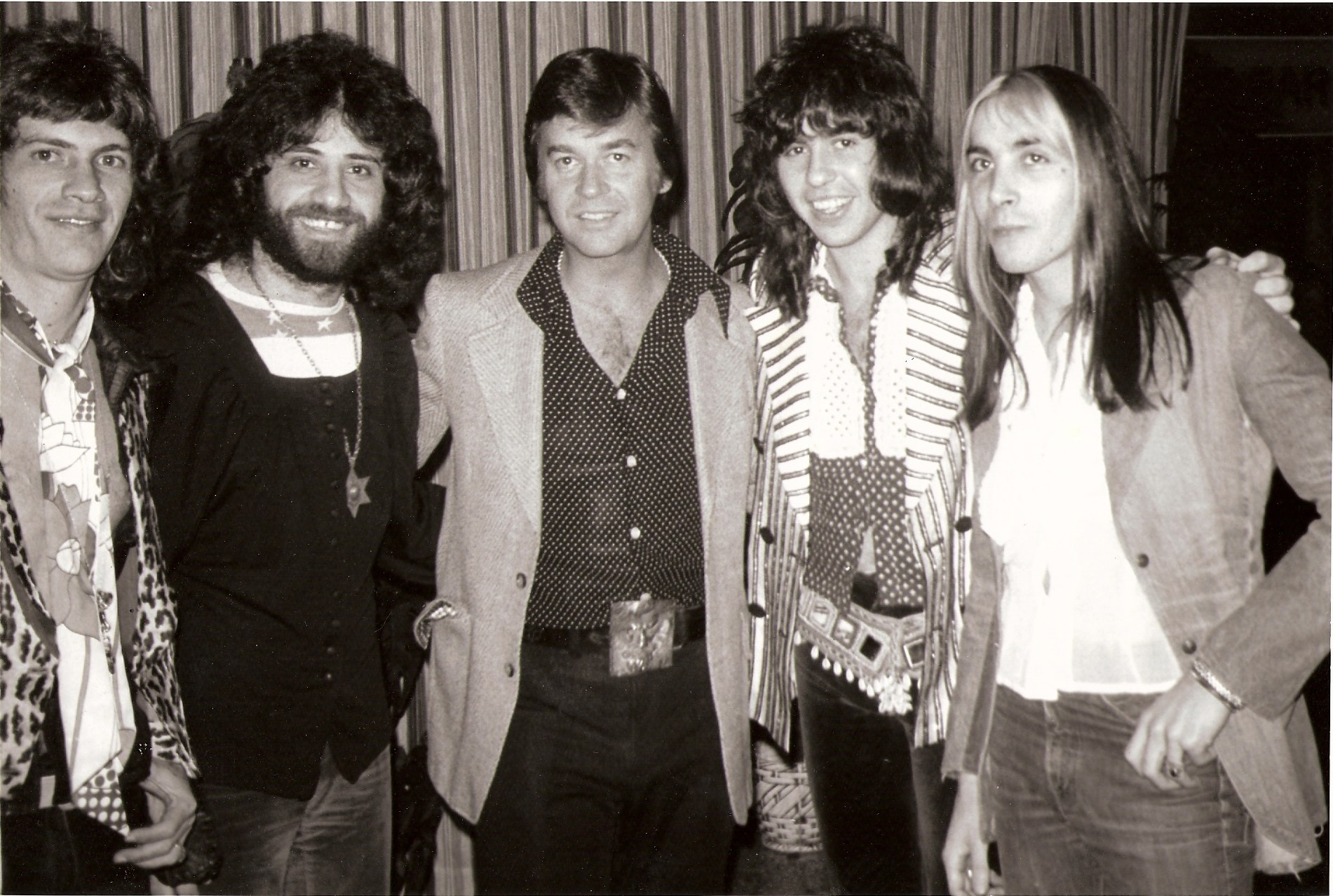

Background information
- Also known as: Variations
- Origin: France
- Genres: Rock and roll Hard rock Rhythm and blues Blues; Middle Eastern
- Years active: 1966–1975
- Labels: Magic, EMI/Pathé Records, Buddah
- Members: Robert Fitoussi "Petit Pois" Grande; Isaac "Jacky" Bitton; Jim Morris; Maurice Meimoun
- Past members: Joe Leb; Michel Chevalier; Carl Storie; Albritton McClain; Marc Tobaly

Les Variations was a French hard rock and blues band from the late 1960s to mid-1970s that sang mostly in English and was known for its rock guitar-based music. Several of its members were born in Morocco and were of Jewish origin. They were France's first band to headline the famed Olympia Theatre, the first to tour America, the first to sign with a US label and the first to achieve hit records in America. On their last two albums, Moroccan Roll (1974) and Cafe de Paris (1975), their compositions, arrangements and lyrics contained sounds and stories of North African and Jewish Sephardic culture as well as the Hebrew songs of the band members' youth growing up in North Africa. With this sound, they introduced a new rock fusion which is now referred to as Moroccanroll music, which is played throughout North Africa and has influenced many western rock bands over the decades that followed.

== History ==
Les Variations was formed in Paris in 1966. Three of the original four members were Moroccan Sephardic Jews. Joe Leb sang vocals, Marc Tobaly played guitar, and Isaac "Jacky" Bitton was on drums. The fourth member, Jacques "Petit Pois" Grande, who played bass, is of Italian heritage. Marc Tobaly's older brother, Alain, became the band's manager. That year they began touring throughout Europe as a live performance band, participating in springboard competitions for young artists. Their early influences were Les Chaussettes Noires and The Rolling Stones. In 1967 they toured Denmark and Germany, where they recorded their first single, "Mustang Sally," released on Triola Records. Returning to France in 1969 they signed with France's EMI/Pathé Records and recorded a second single, "Come Along." That year they also opened for artists like Johnny Hallyday, Led Zeppelin, and Steppenwolf. The next year they went to the UK where they recorded their first album, Nador, and participated in many music festivals. During this time, in 1971, Leb was briefly replaced by French singer Michel Chevalier but returned a year later.

In 1972, Alain Tobably formed a partnership with Doug Yeager and Charles Benanty of Applewood Productions in New York. This began the second phase of the band's career, touring and recording in America. One of their rare French language recordings, "Je Suis Juste Un Rock 'n Roller", was recorded in Cincinnati's 5th Floor Recording Studios. It was produced by Doug Yeager and backed by soul sisters Angel & Sybil and it became their biggest hit, reaching No. 7 in the French pop charts. The band performed in America with the New York Dolls in 1973. That same year they recorded their popular album Take it or Leave It in Memphis's Ardent Studios with producer Don Nix.

They released the bulk of their albums between 1969 and 1973 on Pathe Records, but in 1974 they became the first French rock band to sign with an American label, Buddah Records, while creating a more exotic and unique style reminiscent of their North African roots. Their pioneering infusion of Moroccan sounds and styles was exemplified in their last two albums, 1974's Moroccan Roll, and 1975's Cafe de Paris. Between the making of the two albums, French Tunisian-born Robert Fitoussi replaced Joe Leb and the band added French Tunisian-born violinist of Arabic music, Maurice Meimoun, and American keyboard player and vocalist, Jim Morris. These two final albums would influence rock bands in America, Europe and Africa for the next several generations. Café reached the Billboard Top 200 Album Charts in America, while their single "Superman, Superman", reached No. 36 in the U.S. Pop Charts. During this two-year period, they became the first French rock band to headline the famed Olympia Theatre in Paris, and the only French band to ever headline the national American TV concert show, The Midnight Special, and the national American radio concert special, King Biscuit Flower Hour.

In the summer of 1975, after the band's national tour of America in support of their charted album, Robert Fitoussi choose to branch out on his solo career as F. R. David. Jacques Grande and Maurice Meimoun also left the band at that time. Tobaly, Bitton and Morris added American singer Carl Storie and bassist/singer Albritton McClain to the band at their Cincinnati band house and studio in an attempt to keep going. Ultimately, their major tours and hit record did not bring measurable success in America and Les Variations gave their last concert at Philadelphia's Academy of Music on December 7, 1975, and broke up two weeks later on December 21, 1975.

In 1977, Les Variations reformed for a historic recording session for CBS Records International. Jac Hammer, composer of many classic rock songs such as "Great Balls of Fire," wrote an anthem the night Anwar Sadat flew to Jerusalem to make peace. Three days later, Richie Havens and Les Variations recorded "Shalom, Salem Aleicum" (produced by Charles Benanty, Doug Yeager and David Wilkes), which CBS released immediately throughout the Middle East, and it became a #1 hit in Israel, Egypt and Jordan.

Les Variations were the first and certainly one of the best known rock groups from France, largely in part to their commercial record successes, their frequent concert and television performances, media and press coverage, and their unique position of being the first French rock band to tour America, to sign with an American label and eventually pioneer a new style of rock music over their decade-long existence. Over the course of their career, Les Variations became the first French rock band to tour Europe, Africa and America. Over their ten years on the road they toured with many major acts of the era, including: Bachman–Turner Overdrive, Kiss, The Jimi Hendrix Experience, Cream, Yes, Guess Who, Taste, Queen, Uriah Heep, Rush, Kraftwerk and Aerosmith, to name a few.

In 1993, Maurice Meimoun died in Paris.

At the end of November 2006, the band reunited for a concert in Paris.

In 2009, a Tribute to Les Variations was presented before 250,000 fans at the L'Boulevard Rock Music Festival in Casablanca, Morocco, honoring the band as the Fathers of Moroccanroll music.

Les Variations bassist, Jacques "Petit Pois" Grande, died on June 16, 2011, from cancer, near his home of Davis, California.

In 2012, Marc Tobaly re-founded Les Variations with Laura Mayne.

Tobaly died following a long illness on 10 March 2024, at the age of 74.

== Discography ==
- Nador (1969)
- Take It or Leave It (1973)
- Moroccan Roll (1974)
- Cafe De Paris (1975)

== Current members ==
- Laura Mayne – vocals (2012–)
- Franck Sitbon – keyboards (2012–)
- Philippe Balma – bass (2012–)
- Pierra Veuillot – drums (2012–)

== Former members ==
- Jo Philippe Lebb – vocals (1966–1974)
- Jacques "Petit Pois" Grande – bass (1966–1975)
- Marc Tobaly – guitar (1966–1975, 2012–2024; his death)
- Isaac "Jacky" Bitton – drums (1966–1975)
- Jacques Micheli – guitar (1966)
- Jean-Pierre "Rolling" Azoulay – guitar (1966)
- Guy de Baer – bass (1966)
- Michel Chevalier – vocals (1971)
- Alain Suzan – bass (1972)
- Jim Morris – keyboards (1974–1975)
- Robert Fitoussi (aka F. R. David) – vocals (1974–1975)
- Maurice Meimoun – violin (1975)
- Albritton McClain – guitar (1975)

== Other information ==
- Proud of his Jewish heritage, Bitton wore a noticeable Star of David around his neck during concerts.
