= Marc Tobaly =

Moroccan-born French guitarist and composer (1950–2024)

- Born: 1 January 1950; Fez, French Morocco
- Died: 10 March 2024 (aged 74)
- Occupations: Guitarist; Composer

Marc Tobaly (1 January 1950 – 10 March 2024) was a Moroccan-born French guitarist, composer, and author. He was the guitarist for the rock band Les Variations.

== Biography ==
Born on 1 January 1950 in Fez, Tobaly grew up in the Moroccan musical scene; his grandmother, Zohra Al Fassiya, was a well-known malhun singer. In 1969, he was admitted to SACEM as a songwriter. He founded the group Les Petits Loups with friends in Morocco before moving to Paris and founding Les Variations. He then joined the group King of Hearts before going solo and performing alongside Jo Leb. In September 2008, he released an album in French and English under the title Variations. In 2012, he re-founded Les Variations with Laura Mayne.

Marc Tobaly died following a long illness on 10 March 2024, at the age of 74.

== Discography ==
=== With Les Variations ===
- Nador (1970)
- Take It or Leave It (1973)
- Moroccan Roll (1974)
- Café de Paris (1975)

=== With King of Hearts ===
- Close, But No Guitar

=== Solo singles ===
- "Time To Get Better"
- "Nightmare"
- "Heya"

=== Solo albums ===
- Variations (2008)
