= Tallulah (Feeder album) =

Studio album by Feeder
- Released: 9 August 2019
- Genres: Alternative rock; hard rock
- Length: 45:52
- Label: Believe Music
- Producers: Tim Roe; Grant Nicholas

Feeder chronology
The Best of Feeder / Arrow (2017)	Tallulah (2019)	Torpedo (2022)

Singles from Tallulah
- 1. "Fear of Flying" Released: 27 March 2019; 2. "Youth" Released: 14 May 2019; 3. "Daily Habit" Released: 24 July 2019; 4. "Blue Sky Blue" Released: 20 August 2019

Tallulah is the tenth studio album by Welsh rock band Feeder, released on 9 August 2019 through Believe Music.

The album was a commercial success, charting at number four on the UK Albums Chart, Feeder's first top-five studio album since 2005. The album also debuted at number one on the UK Independent Albums Chart, their first since 2002 and first under new chart rules introduced in 2009, in which only albums entirely released on a fully independent label and distributor are eligible to chart.

== Background ==
The album is named after the daughter of frontman Grant Nicholas's wife's best friend, whom Nicholas describes as "a character". More broadly, the album title is intended to send a "strong message" about "the importance of kids" and how becoming a parent has changed Nicholas's life. The band additionally described the album as a "road trip through [their] pan-American influences".

The single "Fear of Flying" was written from the perspective of a female rock star, but based on Nicholas's own "experiences of being in a band and what you see when you're hanging out with other bands", and explained it also "touches on being a band in the social media age". The single "Blue Sky Blue" was originally written by Nicholas with Liam Gallagher in mind, but by the time he had written it and contacted the publicist both Gallagher and Feeder share, he was informed that Gallagher had already finished his album, Why Me? Why Not.

== Critical reception ==
Professional ratings
Aggregate scores
Source	Rating
Metacritic	67/100
Review scores
Source	Rating
Clash	8/10
The Guardian	2/5 stars
Kerrang!	4/5

Critical response to Tallulah has been generally positive. At Metacritic, which assigns a normalized rating out of 100 to reviews from mainstream music critics, the album received an average score of 67, based on 5 reviews, which indicates "generally favourable reviews". Reviewing the album for Clash, Susan Horner called Tallulah "a celebration" of the "key components" in Feeder's material—an "infectious combination of hooks, imaginative lyrics and dark verses", concluding that "it is hard to think of anything more fitting for a 10th album". Writing for The Guardian, Al Horner summarised the album as "a tour of noughties guitar music that time, or at least the zeitgeist, forgot" and "Nicholas and Hirose play[ing] to their strengths: unabashedly unfashionable guitar anthems with melodic MOR flourishes". Ian Winwood of Kerrang! described Tallulah as an album "busy with songs that fizz with life and the kind of choruses that exist in a glorious, endless summer", declaring it to be "a triumph".

== Track listing ==
Tallulah track listing
No.	Title	Length
1.	"Youth"	3:19
2.	"Blue Sky Blue"	3:50
3.	"Daily Habit"	3:46
4.	"Fear of Flying"	3:56
5.	"Rodeo"	3:33
6.	"Tallulah"	3:52
7.	"Shapes and Sounds"	4:16
8.	"Guillotine"	3:43
9.	"Kyoto"	4:31
10.	"Kite"	3:26
11.	"Windmill"	4:08
12.	"Lonely Hollow Days"	3:32
Total length:		45:52

== Personnel ==
- Grant Nicholas – vocals, guitars, keyboards, percussion, production, and string arrangements
- Taka Hirose – bass guitar
- Karl Brazil – drums on "Blue Sky Blue", "Fear of Flying", "Tallulah", "Shapes and Sounds", "Guillotine", "Kyoto", "Kite", and "Windmill"
- Geoff Holroyde – drums on "Youth", "Daily Habit", and "Rodeo"
- Tim Roe – production, engineering, string arrangements, additional keyboards on "Tallulah", and mixing for "Lonely Hollow Days"
- Luke Gibbs – assistant engineering
- Chris Sheldon – mixing, except for "Lonely Hollow Days"
- Brian Gardner – mastering
- Rugman – artwork

== Charts ==
Chart performance for Tallulah
Chart (2019)	Peak position
Japanese Albums (Oricon)	174
Scottish Albums (Official Charts)	4
Swiss Albums (Schweizer Hitparade)	66
UK Albums (Official Charts)	4
UK Independent Albums (Official Charts)	1
