= Mannequin Pussy =

American punk rock band

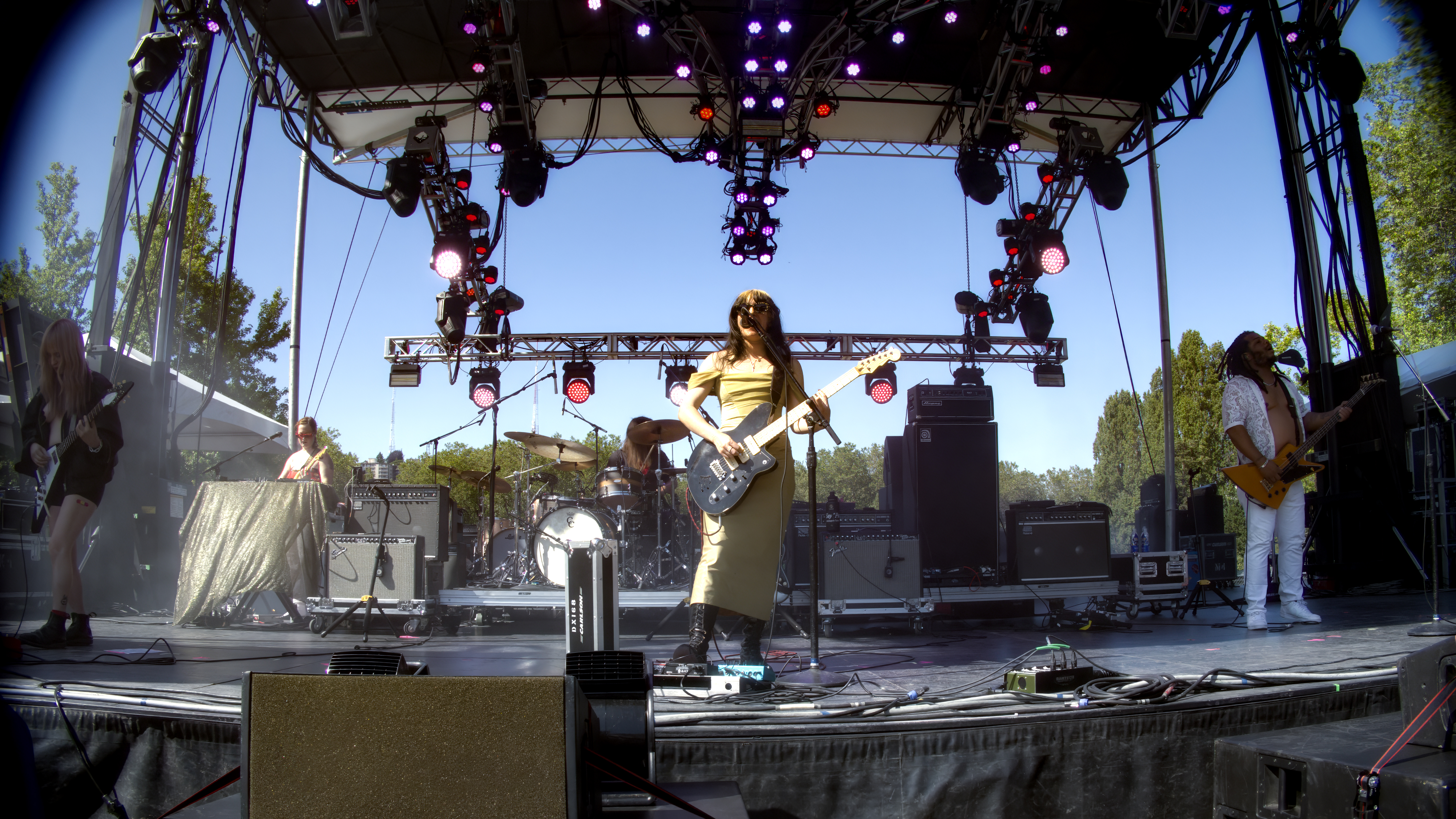
- Mannequin Pussy performing in 2024

Background information
- Origin: Philadelphia, Pennsylvania, U.S.
- Genres: Punk rock; indie rock; noise rock
- Years active: 2010–present
- Labels: Epitaph; Tiny Engines; Reeks Of Effort; Trash Palace Tapes; Rarebit Records
- Members: Marisa Dabice; Kaleen Reading; Colins Regisford; Maxine Steen
- Past members: Drew Adler; Athanasios Paul
- Website: mannequinpussy.com

Mannequin Pussy is an American punk and indie rock band from Philadelphia, formed in 2010. The band currently consists of Marisa "Missy" Dabice (vocals, guitar), Kaleen Reading (drums), Colins "Bear" Regisford (bass, vocals) and Maxine Steen (guitar). During live performances, the band are joined by multi-instrumentalist Carolyn Haynes.

They have released four studio albums: Mannequin Pussy (2014), Romantic (2016), Patience (2019) and I Got Heaven (2024), and one EP, Perfect (2021).

The band has received critical attention in the music press; Rolling Stone ranked the title track from their 2016 album Romantic at number 14 on its year-end "50 Best Songs of 2016" list.

== History ==
=== 2010–2015: Early career and Gypsy Pervert/Mannequin Pussy ===
Mannequin Pussy was formed in October 2010 by friends Marisa "Missy" Dabice and Athanasios Paul, who met when they went to school together. The band was initially a two-piece, with Dabice as the guitarist/singer and Paul as the drummer. In 2011, they released two EPs, titled Bonerjamz! and Meatslave. One of their songs, "Clue Juice", appears on "Leisure Rules", a cassette-only compilation released in July 2012 on the Reeks Of Effort label on Bandcamp. In the same month, thirteen of their songs were released on one side of a split tour cassette called "Banditos", with Idaho band Art Fad on the Trash Palace Tapes label.

At the beginning of 2013, Drew Adler joined the band as a drummer and Paul moved to guitar. Their first full-length album, Gypsy Pervert was released in October 2013, as a limited edition, cassette-only release on the Rarebit Records label. In November 2013, one of their songs appeared on The Le Sigh Vol. 1 Compilation.

In 2014, Mannequin Pussy signed with Tiny Engines. That same year, Mannequin Pussy re-released their debut album on the label titled Gypsy Pervert. It was later retitled Mannequin Pussy, reflecting concern that the original title included a term often used pejoratively toward Romani people.

=== 2015–2020: Romantic and Patience ===
In 2015, Kaleen Reading joined the band as drummer, replacing Drew Adler. In 2016, bassist, Colins "Bear" Regisford joined the line-up as a bassist. Mannequin Pussy released their second full-length album on Tiny Engines titled Romantic on October 28, 2016. The album's title track was ranked number 14 on Rolling Stone magazine's 50 Best Songs of 2016 list. On May 30, 2017, Mannequin Pussy released a music video for the song "Pledge" on their YouTube channel. Dabice told DIY:

"So many times in our life we find ourselves being influenced from the outside. People try to control us – our beliefs, our movements, our identities, our dress…; The video for Pledge sought to narrate a woman’s experience where her movements are controlled by a man, by the others who surround her and the powerful declaration that she is able to make to herself when she can free herself of the people who seek to conform her."

In June 2017, Mannequin Pussy embarked on a European tour, followed by shows in the United States from July to September.

In 2019, Mannequin Pussy announced they had signed with Epitaph Records. On April 24, they released the single "Drunk II" and announced their third album, Patience. The video for "Drunk II", directed by Dabice, depicts her falling in love with three different people at a bar. Leading up to the release of the album, Mannequin Pussy released the singles "Who You Are" on May 20 and "Cream" on June 17. The music video for "Cream", directed by Hanna Hamilton, takes inspiration from '70s horror movies. Patience was released on June 21, 2019. Dabice has described the album as being about un-learning self-hatred, practicing self-love, and being patient with yourself and others.

In November 2019, the band's former label Tiny Engines went on hiatus due to an accounting dispute over not paying artists, including Mannequin Pussy.

In March 2020, Mannequin Pussy was forced to cancel or postpone tour dates due to the COVID-19 pandemic. On March 2, 2021, Dabice appeared as an FBI agent in the music video for "Be Sweet" by Japanese Breakfast.

=== 2021–present: Perfect EP and I Got Heaven ===
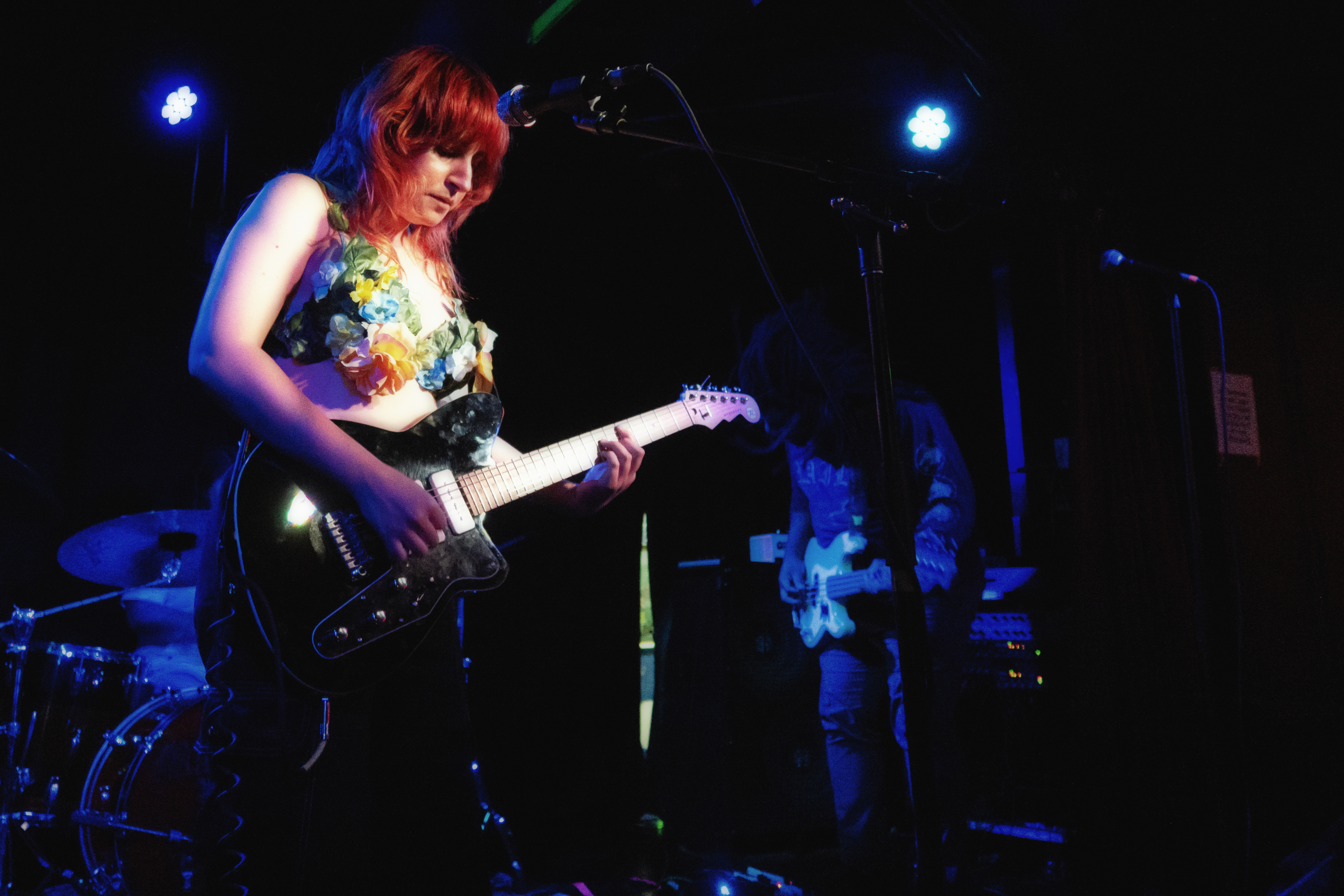
Marisa "Missy" Dabice performing in September 2021

On March 18, it was announced that Paul had left to "begin a new chapter in his life" and the band would continue as a three-piece group. On March 23, Mannequin Pussy announced an EP, titled Perfect, and released its first single, "Control". A second single, the title track "Perfect", was released on April 26, 2021.

Two Mannequin Pussy songs, "Who You Are" and "In Love Again", were performed in the 2021 HBO miniseries Mare of Easttown by the fictional band Androgynous. "Loud Bark" by the band has appeared in the 2025 TV series The Hunting Wives in Season 1, Episode 1 entitled "Strange and Unfamiliar Places".

The Perfect EP was released on May 21, 2021. The majority of the EP was written in the studio since the band members were continuing to self-isolate due to the pandemic. One of its songs, "Pigs Is Pigs", is the first Mannequin Pussy song to feature Regisford singing lead vocals. Pitchfork's Arielle Gordon gave the EP a 7.2 out of 10, and noted "Perfect continues the sophistication of its immediate predecessor while introducing subtle shifts in sound and structure".

In October 2021, the band embarked on tour with two new touring members: guitarist and keyboardist Carolyn Haynes and guitarist Maxine Steen. On October 30, 2021, the band's Ford Econoline touring van and an attached trailer containing equipment valued at over US$50,000 were stolen in Akron, Ohio; they completed the remaining dates with borrowed gear.

In August 2023, Mannequin Pussy bought back the rights to their masters from their former label Tiny Engines, and announced their own imprint label, Romantic Records. The debut release on the label was a reissue of their second album, Romantic. On August 28, the band released the single "I Got Heaven" alongside a music video directed by Mason Mercer and Anthony Miralles set on a farm. Touring guitarist Maxine Steen also became a full member, making the band once again a four-piece. Mannequin Pussy toured the United States, Spain, and Portugal in September and October 2023. In October, the band announced their fourth studio album I Got Heaven, which released on March 1, 2024.

In 2026, Mannequin Pussy joined select dates of the Foo Fighters' Take Cover Tour.

== Musical style and influences ==
Critics have described Mannequin Pussy's sound as a mix of punk rock and indie rock, with bursts of noise and melodic hooks. NPR highlighted the group's "volcanic catharsis" and economy of songwriting on Romantic. Pitchfork characterized the band's approach as combining "scorched-earth ferocity" with pop instincts on both Romantic and the Perfect EP. Flood Magazine has emphasized themes of self-acceptance and emotional release in the band's material.

== Band members ==
Current members

- Marisa "Missy" Dabice – lead vocals, guitar (2010–present), keyboards, bass guitar (2021–present)
- Kaleen Reading – drums (2015–present)
- Colins "Bear" Regisford – bass guitar (2016–present), backing vocals (2019–present), occasional lead vocals (2021–present)
- Maxine Steen – guitar (2023–present; touring 2021–2023)

Current touring musicians

- Carolyn Haynes – keyboards, guitar, backing vocals (2021–present)

Former members

- Drew Adler – drums (2013–2015)
- Athanasios Paul – drums (2010–2013), guitar (2013–2021), keyboards (2019–2021)

== Discography ==
=== Studio albums ===
Full-length studio albums by Mannequin Pussy
Title	Album details
Mannequin Pussy	Released: September 9, 2014; Label: Tiny Engines; Format: Digital download, streaming, vinyl, cassette
Romantic	Released: October 28, 2016; Label: Tiny Engines; Format: Digital download, streaming, CD, vinyl, cassette
Patience	Released: June 21, 2019; Label: Epitaph; Format: Digital download, streaming, CD, vinyl, cassette
I Got Heaven	Released: March 1, 2024; Label: Epitaph; Format: Digital download, streaming, CD, vinyl

=== Extended plays ===
Extended plays by Mannequin Pussy
Title	Album details
Bonerjamz!	Released: 2011
Meatslave	Released: 2011
Mannequin Pussy on Audiotree Live	Released: February 1, 2017; Label: Audiotree; Format: Digital download, streaming
Perfect	Released: May 21, 2021; Label: Epitaph; Format: Digital download, streaming
