= F. R. David =

French musician (1947)

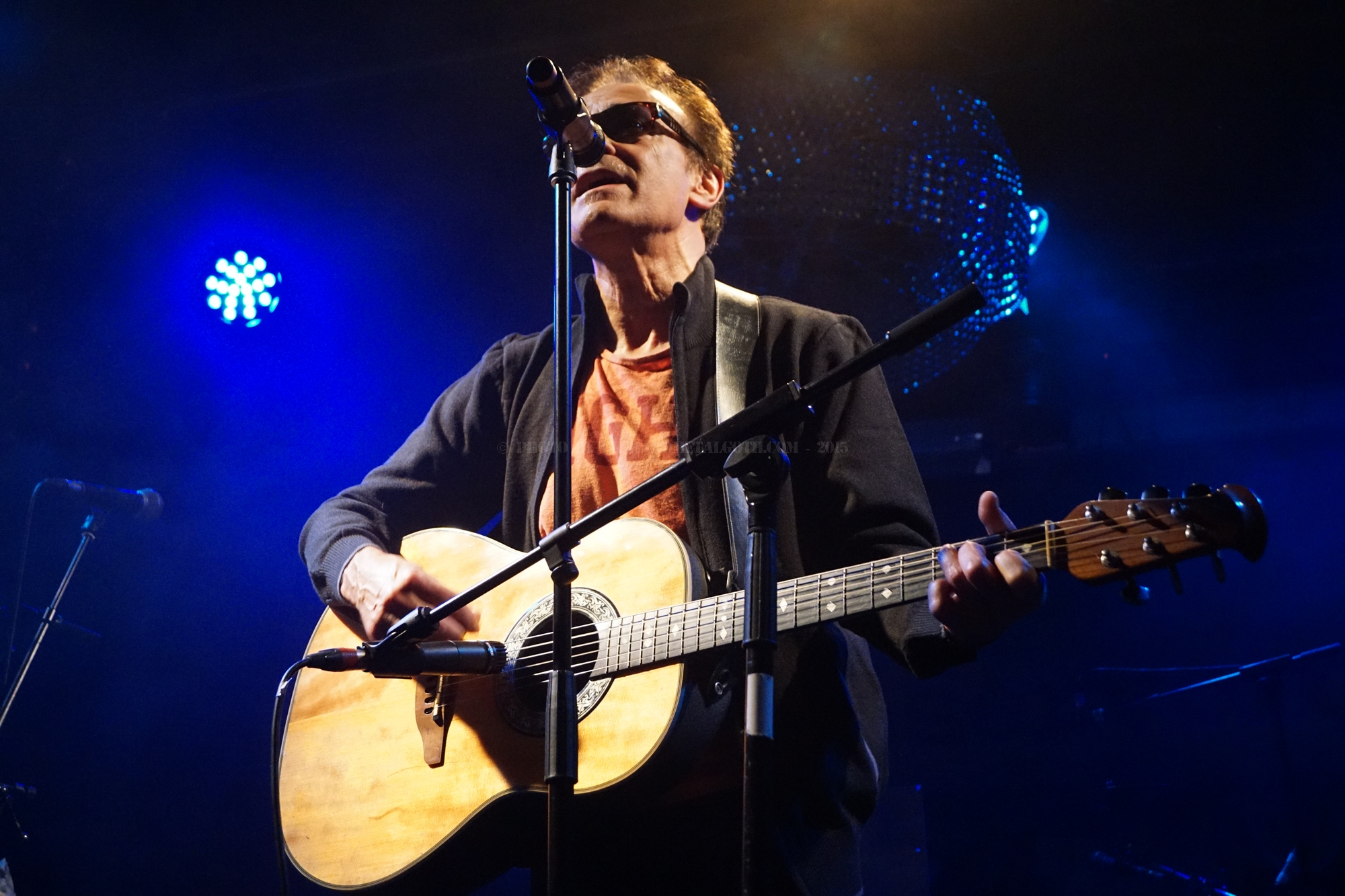
- FR David in 2015

Background information
- Also known as: Robert Fitoussi
- Born: Elli Robert Fitoussi; 1 January 1947 (age 79); Ferryville, French Tunisia
- Origin: Paris, France
- Genres: Europop; synth-pop; pop rock
- Occupations: Musician; singer; composer
- Instruments: Vocals; bass; guitar
- Years active: 1963–present
- Labels: Carrere; Discos RGE; Discos CBS; Columbia; Epic; CBS Records; Sony
- Website: www.frdavid.net

Elli Robert Fitoussi (born 1 January 1947), known professionally as F. R. David (French pronunciation: [ɛf ɛʁ david]), is a French singer, guitarist and musician. He is best known for his 1982 international hit single "Words", which topped the charts in many countries.

== Early life, family and education ==
Elli Robert Fitoussi was born to a Tunisian Jewish family. He was born and grew up in Menzel Bourguiba, formerly known as Ferryville, which was then part of the French protectorate of Tunisia.

== Career ==
In Paris, he began his music career as Robert Fitoussi. He first performed with French garage band Les Trèfles. After one EP, they expanded and were renamed Les Boots, but achieved very little commercial success. Adopting his new stage name - in which the initials F.R. referred to the first letters of the artist's real name and surname, and “David” - to the story of David and Goliath, because he is Jewish - he went solo in 1967 and recorded some orchestral psychedelic pop with Michel Colombier, including a version of the Beatles' "Strawberry Fields Forever" ("Il Est Plus Facile"). He enjoyed minor hits with the Éric Charden penned "Symphonie" and a cover of the Bee Gees' "Sir Geoffrey Saved the World", but this success did not last. He then created Aztec Records with Sonopress & Carrer and started working with Michael Haubrich, where they wrote and produced for several small groups. The first was called Cockpit, followed by David Cast, Doc & Prohibition Group, Ragga, Alain Maria, Freddy Meyer, and DD Daughterdydawn with Vangelis Papathanassiou.

During the early 1970s, F.R.David formed the progressive rock group David Explosion, but their one album was not a success. He was a guitarist for Vangelis in the early 1970s. With Vangelis, he also appeared as vocalist on some of his early 1970s albums. David's voice is also heard on the 1974 single "Who" by Vangelis under the name 'Odyssey'. David then joined French rock band Les Variations, appearing on their final album Café De Paris (1975), which featured an early rock-disco crossover "Superman, Superman". When the band broke up, he went solo again. His personal "trademarks" are his sunglasses and his guitar (a white Fender Stratocaster).

His most recognised song was his hit song "Words", which sold eight million records worldwide and topped various charts throughout Europe in late 1982. The song reached No. 2 on the UK Singles Chart in spring 1983, surpassing a rival version by 1960s hitmakers the Tremeloes, and went on to become the 22nd best-selling single in the UK during 1983. The song appears in the Oscar-nominated film for Best Picture, Call Me by Your Name. The song is a catchy, slightly melancholy ballad led by synths and sung in a slender, high-pitched voice.

During the 1990s, F.R.David focused on writing and composing for other well known artists. He released another album, Words – '99 Version in 2000 which contains mostly covers. In 2006, the album The Wheel - the track list of which was opened and closed by two new remixes of the song "Words" - was released.

In 2009, F.R.David released the album Numbers, which was recorded in collaboration with other musicians and featured songs that Robert himself most preferred. Between 2010 and 2011, he went on a national French tour of 52 concerts. In 2013, F.R.David released an album "Midnight drive".

== Personal life ==
Elli Fitoussi is married, has two grown up children and one grandchild. He currently shares his time between his studio in Paris, France and his summer residence in Valencia, Spain.

== Discography ==
=== Studio albums ===
Title	Year	Peak positions	
Title	Year	GER	UK
Words	1982	13	46
Long Distance Flight	1984	—	—
Reflections	1987	—	—
Voices of the Blue Planet (with Yoann Marine)	1998	—	—
Words – '99 Version	1999	—	—
The Wheel	2006	—	—
Numbers	2008	—	—
Midnight Drive	2013	—	—
"—" denotes releases that did not chart.

=== Compilation albums ===
- Rocker Blues (1986, Argentina only)
- Greatest Hits (1991)
- Best of F. R. David (2000)
- Songbook (2003)

=== Singles ===
Title	Year	Peak positions								Album
Title	Year	FRA	AUS	AUT	GER	UK	US	SWI	ESP	Album
"Black Jack"	1981	—	—	—	—	—	—	—	—	(Single only)
"Words"	1982	2	12	1	1	2	62	1	1	Words
"Pick Up the Phone"	1983	—	—	—	26	—	—	—	—	Words
"Music"	1983	—	—	—	—	71	—	—	—	Words
"I Need You"	1983	—	—	—	33	—	—	—	—	(Single only)
"Play a Little Game"	1983	—	—	—	—	—	—	—	—	(Single only)
"Gotta Get a Move On"	1983	—	—	—	—	—	—	—	—	(Single only)
"Sand Dunes"	1983	—	—	—	—	—	—	—	—	(Single only)
"Long Distance Flight"	1984	—	—	—	—	—	—	—	—	Long Distance Flight
"This Time I Have to Win"	1984	—	—	—	—	—	—	—	—	Long Distance Flight
"Dream Away"	1984	—	—	—	—	—	—	—	—	Long Distance Flight
"Sahara Night"	1986	—	—	—	—	—	—	—	9	Reflections
"Sun"	1987	—	—	—	—	—	—	—	—	Reflections
"Don't Go"	1987	—	—	—	—	—	—	—	—	Reflections
"Words" (1989 remix)	1989	—	—	—	—	—	—	—	—	(Single only)
"I'll Try to Love Again"	1992	—	—	—	—	—	—	—	—	(Single only)
"Words (Single & Extended Version)"	2012	—	—	—	—	—	—	—	—	(Single only)
"Your Love Shines"	2018	—	—	—	—	—	—	—	—	(Single only)
"Paris Is Her Home"	2018	—	—	—	—	—	—	—	—	(Single only)
"Words (Red Bus Remix)"	2019	—	—	—	—	—	—	—	—	(Single only)
"Time Is Not Mine"	2022	—	—	—	—	—	—	—	—	(Single only)
"Words (Sped Up 10 %)"	2023	—	—	—	—	—	—	—	—	(Single only)
"I WON'T FORGET YOU"	2025	—	—							
"—" denotes releases that did not chart or were not released in that territory.

== Discography in other formations ==
with Les Trèfles

- Sont ils innocent? (EP, 1965)

with Les Boots

- "Laissez briller le soleil"/"Trop tard"/"Le cerf-volant"/"Demain" (EP, 1966)
- "Les gens sont méchants"/"Ali Baba"/"Vingt ans"/"Twen" (EP, 1966)
- Tout Va Bien (Compilation, 1997)

with Cockpit

- Cockpit (album, 1971)
- "Fifi"/"Father Machine" (single, 1971)
- "Bright Tomorrow"/"Lena, Lena" (single, 1971)
- "Mister Hardy"/"8 Days and a Wake Up" (single, 1972)

with Les Variations

- Café de Paris (album, 1975)

with King of Hearts

- Close, but No Guitar (album, 1978)
