= Puddle of Mudd discography =

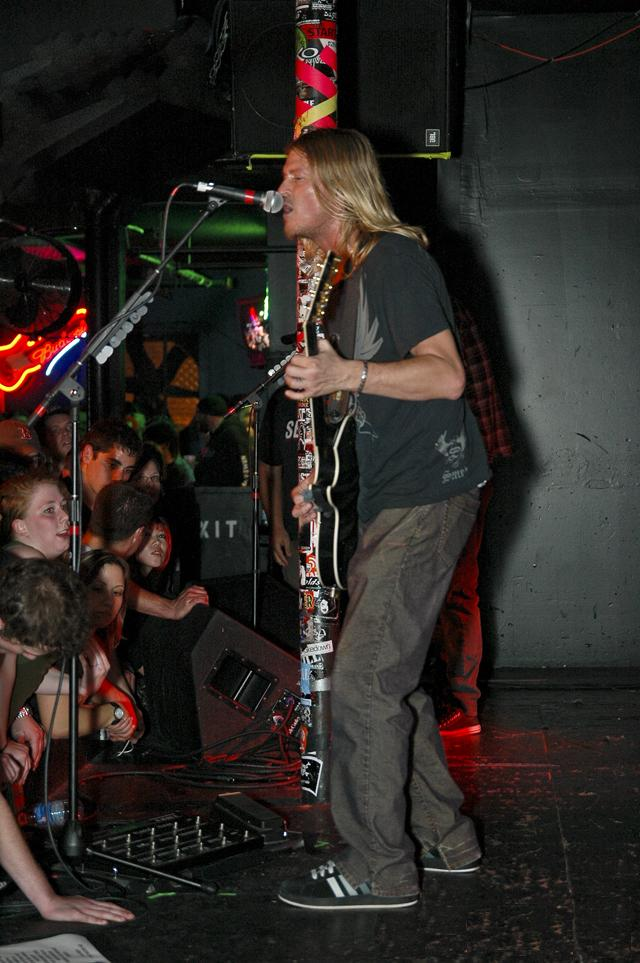
- Frontman Wes Scantlin in 2008
- Studio albums: 9
- Extended plays: 1
- Compilation albums: 1
- Singles: 22
- Video albums: 1
- Music videos: 16

Puddle of Mudd is an American rock band from Kansas City, Missouri, formed in 1992 by Wes Scantlin (lead vocals, rhythm guitar) and released their seven-song debut EP titled Stuck in 1994, the band's first commercial release. They released their debut album Abrasive independently in 1997, their major label debut, 2001's Come Clean, has sold over five million copies. They have released nine studio albums, with their latest being Kiss the Machine in May 2025, one EP, one greatest hits compilation, one video album, altogether selling over seven million albums.

== Albums ==
=== Studio albums ===
Title	Details	Peak chart positions										Certifications (sales thresholds)
Title	Details	US	US Alt	US Rock	AUS	AUT	NLD	NZL	SWE	SWI	UK	Certifications (sales thresholds)
Abrasive	Released: September 3, 1997; Label: Hardknocks; Formats: CD	—	—	—	—	—	—	—	—	—	—	
Come Clean	Released: August 28, 2001; Label: Flawless/Geffen; Formats: CD	9	—	—	23	8	53	10	52	26	12	RIAA: 3× Platinum; ARIA: Gold; BPI: Platinum; MC: Platinum; RMNZ: Gold
Life on Display	Released: November 25, 2003; Label: Flawless/Geffen; Formats: CD, DI	20	—	—	—	55	—	—	—	48	90	RIAA: Gold; MC: Gold
Famous	Released: October 9, 2007; Label: Flawless/Geffen; Formats: CD, DI	27	8	11	—	—	—	—	—	—	—	
Volume 4: Songs in the Key of Love & Hate	Released: December 8, 2009; Label: Flawless/Geffen; Formats: CD, DI	95	12	20	—	—	—	—	—	—	—	
re:(disc)overed	Released: August 30, 2011; Label: RED; Formats: CD, DI	96	17	21	—	—	—	—	—	—	—	
Welcome to Galvania	Released: September 13, 2019; Label: Pavement Music; Formats: CD, DI	— (Note: Although Welcome to Galvania did not enter the Billboard 200, it reached numbers 84 and 65 on the Billboard Top Album Sales and Top Current Album Sales charts.)	17	29	—	—	—	—	—	—	— (Note: Although Welcome to Galvania did not enter the UK Albums Chart, it reached number 34 on the UK Rock and Metal Albums Chart.)	
Ubiquitous	Released: September 8, 2023; Label: Pavement Music; Formats: CD, DI	—	—	—	—	—	—	—	—	—	—	
Kiss the Machine	Released: May 2, 2025; Label: Pavement Music; Formats: CD, DI	—	—	—	—	—	—	—	—	—	—	
"—" denotes releases that did not chart

=== Video albums ===
Year	Video details
2005	Striking That Familiar Chord: Released: May 31, 2005; Label: Eagle Vision (801213012091); Format: DVD, UMD

=== Compilation albums ===
Year	Album details
2010	Best of Puddle of Mudd: Released: November 2, 2010; Label: Geffen, Universal; Format: CD

== EPs ==
Year	EP details
1994	Stuck: Released: August 27, 1994; Label: Mudd Dog/V&R

== Singles ==
Year	Song	Peak chart positions										Certifications	Album
Year	Song	US	US Alt.	US Main.	AUS	CAN	GER	NLD	NZL	SWI	UK	Certifications	Album
2001	"Control"	68	3	3	54	—	60	—	—	84	15	RMNZ: Gold	Come Clean
2001	"Blurry"	5	1	1	52	2	44	98	9	72	8	BPI: Gold; RMNZ: 2× Platinum	Come Clean
2002	"Drift & Die"	61	3	1	—	35	—	—	—	—	—		Come Clean
2002	"She Hates Me"	13	2	1	9	—	20	37	49	23	14	ARIA: Gold; BPI: Gold; RMNZ: Platinum	Come Clean
2003	"Away from Me"	72	5	1	76	—	—	—	—	—	55		Life on Display
2004	"Heel Over Head"	— (Note: "Heel Over Head" did not chart on the Billboard Hot 100, but did peak at number sixteen on the Bubbling Under Hot 100 chart.)	10	6	—	—	—	—	—	—	—		Life on Display
2004	"Spin You Around"	—	38	16	—	—	—	—	—	—	—		Life on Display
2007	"Famous"	— (Note: "Famous" did not chart on the Billboard Hot 100, but did peak at number eighteen on the Bubbling Under Hot 100 chart.)	20	2	—	97	—	—	—	—	—		Famous
2007	"Psycho"	67	1	1	—	56	—	—	—	—	—	RMNZ: Gold	Famous
2008	"We Don't Have to Look Back Now"	—	33	31	—	—	—	—	32	—	—		Famous
2008	"Livin' on Borrowed Time"	—	40	15	—	—	—	—	—	—	—		Famous
2009	"Spaceship"	—	26	6	—	—	—	—	—	—	—		Volume 4: Songs in the Key of Love & Hate
2010	"Stoned"	—	33	6	—	—	—	—	—	—	—		Volume 4: Songs in the Key of Love & Hate
2010	"Keep It Together"	—	—	—	—	—	—	—	—	—	—		Volume 4: Songs in the Key of Love & Hate
2011	"Gimme Shelter"	—	—	26	—	—	—	—	—	—	—		re:(disc)overed
2014	"Piece of the Action"	—	—	—	—	—	—	—	—	—	—		Non-album single
2019	"Uh Oh"	—	—	9	—	—	—	—	—	—	—		Welcome to Galvania
2021	"Just Tell Me"	—	—	—	—	—	—	—	—	—	—		Welcome to Galvania
2022	"My Kind of Crazy"	—	—	—	—	—	—	—	—	—	—		Welcome to Galvania
2023	"My Baby"	—	—	—	—	—	—	—	—	—	—		Ubiquitous
2024	"Cash & Cobain"	—	—	—	—	—	—	—	—	—	—		Ubiquitous
2025	"Beautimous"	—	—	—	—	—	—	—	—	—	—		Kiss the Machine
2025	"Firefly"	—	—	—	—	—	—	—	—	—	—		Kiss the Machine
2025	"Monsters"	—	—	—	—	—	—	—	—	—	—		Non-album singles
2026	"Rain"	—	—	—	—	—	—	—	—	—	—		Non-album singles
2026	"Free"	—	—	—	—	—	—	—	—	—	—		Kiss the Machine

== Promotional singles ==
Year	Song	Peak chart positions	Album
Year	Song	US Rock Digi.	Album
1997	"Abrasive"	—	Abrasive
2001	"Out of My Head"	—	Come Clean
2003	"Daddy"	—	Life on Display
2010	"Shook Up the World"	45	Non-album single
2020	"Go to Hell"	—	Welcome to Galvania

== Music videos ==
Year	Song	Director(s)
2001	"Control"	Fred Durst
2002	"Blurry"	Fred Durst
2002	"Drift & Die"	Fred Durst
2002	"She Hates Me"	Marc Webb
2003	"Away from Me"	Dean Karr
2004	"Heel Over Head"	Chris Cuffaro
2004	"Spin You Around"	Goetz Brothers
2007	"Psycho"	Goetz Brothers
2008	"We Don't Have to Look Back Now"	Goetz Brothers
2009	"Spaceship"	Petro Papahadjopoulos
2010	"Stoned"	Ryan Ramos and Bradley Warden
2019	"Uh Oh"	Reuben Armstrong
2021	"Just Tell Me"	Blake Scantlin and Reuben Armstrong
2022	"My Kind of Crazy"	Unknown
2024	"Cash & Cobain"	Unknown
2025	"Beautimous"	Unknown
2025	"Monsters"	Xinyi Li / Eric T. Johnson
2026	"Maniac"	Unknown
2026	"Rain"	Unknown
2026	"Free"	Vicente Cordero
2026	"Win Win Win"	Unknown
