= List of songs recorded by Puddle of Mudd =

The following is a table of all songs recorded and/or written by Puddle of Mudd.

- The columns Title, Year, and Album list each song title, the year in which the song was recorded, and the official US studio album.
- The column Author(s) lists the writer(s) of each song.

There are 91 songs on this list.

== Table ==
Title	Year	Length	Album	Author(s)	Lead vocal(s)	Chart position US	Chart position US Alt.	Chart position US Main.	Chart position US Rock	Notes
"Gimp"	1994	3:16								
"Overdose"	1994	4:47								
"Hole"	1994	3:25								
"Red Sun"	1994									
"Apple Tree"	1994									
"Chemical Head Change"	1995	3:11	Demo CD		Wesley Scantlin	—	—	—	—	
"What You Gonna Do/Angry Young Revolution"	1995	3:35	Demo CD		Wesley Scantlin	—	—	—	—	
"Am I Amoeba?"	1996	2:57								
"Freaktown"										
"Down On Me"	1996	3:03								
"You Don't Know"	1994	3:32	Stuck		Wesley Scantlin	—	—	—	—	
"Used"	1994	3:13	Stuck		Wesley Scantlin	—	—	—	—	
"Drift & Die"	1994	3:36	Stuck		Wesley Scantlin	—	—	—	—	
"Harassed"	1994	4:16	Stuck		Wesley Scantlin	—	—	—	—	
"Poke Out My Eyes"	1994	4:19	Stuck		Wesley Scantlin	—	—	—	—	
"Prisoner"	1994	3:08	Stuck		Wesley Scantlin	—	—	—	—	
"Suicide"	1994	3:32	Stuck		Wesley Scantlin	—	—	—	—	
"Abrasive"	1997	3:13	Abrasive		Wesley Scantlin	—	—	—	—	
"Nobody Told Me"	1997	3:50	Abrasive		Wesley Scantlin	—	—	—	—	
"Stressed Out"	1997	3:48	Abrasive		Wesley Scantlin	—	—	—	—	
"Hour Glass Man"	1997	4:29	Abrasive		Wesley Scantlin	—	—	—	—	
"Migraine"	1997	3:24	Abrasive		Wesley Scantlin	—	—	—	—	
"Said"	1997	3:10	Abrasive		Wesley Scantlin	—	—	—	—	
"All I Ask For"	1997	4:42	Abrasive		Wesley Scantlin	—	—	—	—	
"Purple Heart"	1997	3:24	Abrasive		Wesley Scantlin	—	—	—	—	
"Locket"	1997	3:37	Abrasive		Wesley Scantlin	—	—	—	—	
"Time"	1997	2:51	Abrasive		Wesley Scantlin	—	—	—	—	
"Piss It All Away"	1997	4:59	Abrasive		Wesley Scantlin	—	—	—	—	
"Control"	2001	3:50	Come Clean		Wesley Scantlin	68	3	3	—	
"Drift & Die"	2001	4:25	Come Clean		Wesley Scantlin	61	3	1	—	
"Out of My Head"	2001	3:43	Come Clean		Wesley Scantlin	—	—	—	—	
"Nobody Told Me"	2001	5:22	Come Clean		Wesley Scantlin	—	—	—	—	
"Blurry"	2001	5:04	Come Clean		Wesley Scantlin	5	1	1	—	
"She Hates Me"	2001	3:37	Come Clean		Wesley Scantlin	13	2	1	—	
"Bring Me Down"	2001	4:03	Come Clean		Wesley Scantlin	—	—	—	—	
"Never Change"	2001	3:59	Come Clean		Wesley Scantlin	—	—	—	—	
"Basement"	2001	4:22	Come Clean		Wesley Scantlin	—	—	—	—	
"Said"	2001	4:08	Come Clean		Wesley Scantlin	—	—	—	—	
"Piss It All Away"	2001	5:39	Come Clean		Wesley Scantlin	—	—	—	—	
"Abrasive"	2001	3:14	Come Clean		Wesley Scantlin	—	—	—	—	Bonus Track
"Control (Acoustic)"	2001	4:09	Come Clean		Wesley Scantlin	—	—	—	—	Bonus Track
"Away from Me"	2003	4:00	Life on Display		Wesley Scantlin	72	5	1	—	
"Heel Over Head"	2003	4:05	Life on Display		Wesley Scantlin	116	10	6	—	
"Nothing Left to Lose"	2003	4:30	Life on Display		Wesley Scantlin	—	—	—	—	
"Change My Mind"	2003	4:20	Life on Display		Wesley Scantlin	—	—	—	—	
"Spin You Around"	2003	4:27	Life on Display		Wesley Scantlin	—	38	16	—	
"Already Gone"	2003	4:32	Life on Display		Wesley Scantlin	—	—	—	—	
"Think"	2003	4:10	Life on Display		Wesley Scantlin	—	—	—	—	
"Cloud 9"	2003	3:34	Life on Display		Wesley Scantlin	—	—	—	—	
"Bottom"	2003	5:22	Life on Display		Wesley Scantlin	—	—	—	—	
"Freak of the World"	2003	3:36	Life on Display		Wesley Scantlin	—	—	—	—	
"Sydney"	2003	4:58	Life on Display		Wesley Scantlin	—	—	—	—	
"Time Flies"	2003	7:05	Life on Display		Wesley Scantlin	—	—	—	—	
"Life Ain't Fair"	2003	3:45	Life on Display		Wesley Scantlin	—	—	—	—	Bonus Track
"Daddy"	2003	4:17	Life on Display		Wesley Scantlin	—	—	—	—	Bonus Track
"Bleed"	2004	3:35	The Punisher: The Album		Wesley Scantlin	—	—	—	—	
"Famous"	2007	3:16	Famous	Wesley Scantlin, Brian Howes, and Doug Ardito	Wesley Scantlin	118	20	2	—	
"Livin' on Borrowed Time"	2007	3:03	Famous	Wesley Scantlin and Christian Stone	Wesley Scantlin	—	40	15	—	
"It Was Faith"	2007	3:31	Famous	Wesley Scantlin, Brian Howes, and Kara DioGuardi	Wesley Scantlin	—	—	—	—	
"Psycho"	2007	3:31	Famous	Wesley Scantlin and Tony Battaglia	Wesley Scantlin	67	1	1	—	
"We Don't Have to Look Back Now"	2007	3:34	Famous		Wesley Scantlin	—	33	31	—	
"Moonshine"	2007	4:07	Famous		Wesley Scantlin	—	—	—	—	
"Thinking About You"	2007	3:42	Famous		Wesley Scantlin	—	—	—	—	
"Merry Go Round"	2007	2:42	Famous		Wesley Scantlin	—	—	—	—	
"I'm So Sure"	2007	4:33	Famous		Wesley Scantlin	—	—	—	—	
"Radiate"	2007	3:13	Famous		Wesley Scantlin	—	—	—	—	
"If I Could Love You"	2007	3:11	Famous		Wesley Scantlin	—	—	—	—	
"Cast Away"	2007	3:18	Famous		Wesley Scantlin	—	—	—	—	Best Buy Exclusive Track
"Reason"	2007	4:08	Famous		Wesley Scantlin	—	—	—	—	Target Exclusive Track
"Miracle"	2007	4:01	Famous		Wesley Scantlin	—	—	—	—	Target Exclusive Track
"Stoned"	2009	3:30	Volume 4: Songs in the Key of Love & Hate	Wesley Scantlin	Wesley Scantlin	—	33	6	22	
"Spaceship"	2009	3:22	Volume 4: Songs in the Key of Love & Hate	Wesley Scantlin	Wesley Scantlin	129	26	6	16	
"Keep It Together"	2009	3:52	Volume 4: Songs in the Key of Love & Hate		Wesley Scantlin	—	—	—	—	
"Out of My Way"	2009	4:02	Volume 4: Songs in the Key of Love & Hate		Wesley Scantlin	—	—	—	—	
"Blood on the Table"	2009	3:13	Volume 4: Songs in the Key of Love & Hate		Wesley Scantlin	—	—	—	—	
"The Only Reason"	2009	4:07	Volume 4: Songs in the Key of Love & Hate		Wesley Scantlin	—	—	—	—	
"Pitchin' a Fit"	2009	3:39	Volume 4: Songs in the Key of Love & Hate		Wesley Scantlin	—	—	—	—	
"Uno Mas"	2009	2:59	Volume 4: Songs in the Key of Love & Hate		Wesley Scantlin	—	—	—	—	
"Better Place"	2009	4:01	Volume 4: Songs in the Key of Love & Hate		Wesley Scantlin	—	—	—	—	
"Hooky"	2009	3:10	Volume 4: Songs in the Key of Love & Hate		Wesley Scantlin	—	—	—	—	
"Spaceship (Acoustic)"	2009	3:15	Volume 4: Songs in the Key of Love & Hate		Wesley Scantlin	—	—	—	—	Deluxe Edition Bonus Tracks
"Better Place (Acoustic)"	2009	3:53	Volume 4: Songs in the Key of Love & Hate		Wesley Scantlin	—	—	—	—	Deluxe Edition Bonus Tracks
"Stoned (Acoustic)"	2009	3:33	Volume 4: Songs in the Key of Love & Hate		Wesley Scantlin	—	—	—	—	Deluxe Edition Bonus Tracks
"Crowsfeet"	2009	4:08	Volume 4: Songs in the Key of Love & Hate		Wesley Scantlin	—	—	—	—	Deluxe Edition Bonus Tracks
"Living In A Dream"	2009	4:27	Volume 4: Songs in the Key of Love & Hate		Wesley Scantlin	—	—	—	—	iTunes Exclusive Track
"Shook Up the World"	2009	4:55	Volume 4: Songs in the Key of Love & Hate		Wesley Scantlin	—	—	—	—	Puddle of Mudd Website Exclusive Track
"Gimme Shelter"	2011	5:05	Re:(disc)overed	Mick Jagger and Keith Richards	Wesley Scantlin	—	—	30	—	
"Old Man"	2011	5:06	Re:(disc)overed	Neil Young	Wesley Scantlin	—	—	—	—	
"T.N.T."	2011	3:55	Re:(disc)overed	Bon Scott, Angus Young and Malcolm Young	Wesley Scantlin	—	—	—	—	
"Stop Draggin' My Heart Around"	2011	4:07	Re:(disc)overed	Tom Petty and Mike Campbell	Wesley Scantlin	—	—	—	—	
"The Joker"	2011	4:08	Re:(disc)overed		Wesley Scantlin	—	—	—	—	
"Everybody Wants You"	2011	3:36	Re:(disc)overed	Billy Squier	Wesley Scantlin	—	—	—	—	
"Rocket Man"	2011	6:05	Re:(disc)overed	Elton John and Bernie Taupin	Wesley Scantlin	—	—	—	—	
"All Right Now"	2011	5:35	Re:(disc)overed	Paul Rodgers and Andy Fraser	Wesley Scantlin	—	—	—	—	
"Shooting Star"	2011	5:17	Re:(disc)overed	Paul Rodgers	Wesley Scantlin	—	—	—	—	
"D'yer Mak'er"	2011	4:19	Re:(disc)overed	John Bonham, John Paul Jones, Jimmy Page, and Robert Plant	Wesley Scantlin	—	—	—	—	
"Funk #49"	2011	4:13	Re:(disc)overed	Joe Walsh, Dale Peters, and Jim Fox	Wesley Scantlin	—	—	—	—	
"With a Little Help from My Friends"	2011	6:30	Re:(disc)overed	John Lennon and Paul McCartney	Wesley Scantlin	—	—	—	—	iTunes Exclusive Track
"Cocaine"	2011	3:44	Re:(disc)overed	JJ Cale	Wesley Scantlin	—	—	—	—	iTunes Exclusive Track
"Piece of the Action"	2014	4:11	Non-album single		Wesley Scantlin	—	—	—	—	
"Uh Oh"	2019	3:28	Welcome to Galvania		Wesley Scantlin	—	—	—	—	
