= Keep It Together (Puddle of Mudd song) =

2010 single by Puddle of Mudd

Single by Puddle of Mudd

from the album Volume 4: Songs in the Key of Love & Hate
- Released: July 12, 2010
- Recorded: 2009
- Genre: Alternative rock; post-grunge; hard rock
- Length: 3:52
- Label: Geffen
- Songwriters: Wes Scantlin; Paul Phillips
- Producer: Brian Howes

Puddle of Mudd singles chronology
"Stoned" (2010)	"Keep It Together" (2010)	"Gimme Shelter" (2011)

Audio video
- "Keep It Together" on YouTube

"Keep It Together" is a song by the American rock band Puddle of Mudd. It was released to radio on July 12, 2010 as the third and final single from their fourth major-label studio album, Volume 4: Songs in the Key of Love & Hate (2009). The song peaked at the number 38 position on Billboard's Active Rock chart in September 2010, the single was also the band's last single of original material to feature bassist Doug Ardito and lead guitarist Paul Phillips before Ardito's departure in June 2010 and Phillips' departure in October 2011.

== Background and production ==
Keep It Together was recorded in 2009 during the sessions for Volume 4: Songs in the Key of Love & Hate. Produced by members of the band alongside Brian Howes who had last collaborated with the band on their 2007 album Famous.

In an interview with Ultimate-Guitar lead singer Wes Scantlin revealed that "Keep It Together" originated during a writing session at his home with guitarist Paul Phillips. The song began as an acoustic piece with a sampled cello sound created using a midi keyboard. Scantlin described how he and Phillips developed the song, noting that he altered the original arrangement to achieve a sound he felt was stronger and less "cheesy" with Scantlin himself writing all the lyrics and melody during this session, with Phillips writing the riff.

He also stated the song's lyrics, including the line "I would take a bullet just to save your life", were inspired by Scantlin's personal relationship with his wife and the challenges they faced during the recording process, explaining that the song served as a message encouraging her to remain patient during the demanding period of writing and recording the album.

Although not an official member of the band, future Foo Fighters drummer Josh Freese performed the drums on "Keep It Together", not Ryan Yerdon, who was the band's permanent drummer at that time.

== Release and reception ==
"Keep It Together" was officially released to rock radio as a single on July 12, 2010. Upon its release, the song received mixed to positive feedback from reviewers.

TuneLab described it as the likely radio darling of their new album Volume 4: Songs in the Key of Love & Hate and stated that luckily for the masses, Keep It Together is actually quite memorable. The review highlighted that the distinct delivery of the song's hook and how it will ultimately spare Keep It Together from falling by the wayside and noted that the lead guitar for Keep It Together is heavily reminiscent of Fuel's Hemorrhage (In My Hands).

On October 15, 2010 when the band announced their greatest hits album Best of Puddle of Mudd and its track listing, it was revealed Keep It Together would be released on it despite it only becoming a single just a few months before the greatest hits album was announced.

== Composition and sound ==
"Keep It Together" is an acoustic-driven ballad that features a softer vocal delivery from singer Wes Scantlin, contrasting with the heavier tracks on the album. SputnikMusic described the song as one of the record's ballads showcasing Scantlin's “soft side”, noting its similarity in style to ballads commonly found on records by bands like Nickelback and Hinder.

== Track listing ==
No.	Title	Writer(s)	Length
1.	"Keep It Together"	Wes Scantlin; Paul Phillips	3:52
Total length:			3:52

== Charts ==
Chart (2010)	Peak position
U.S. Active Rock (Billboard)	38

== Personnel ==
- Wes Scantlin – lead vocals, guitar, songwriting
- Paul Phillips – lead guitar, songwriter
- Doug Ardito – bass, backing vocals
- Josh Freese – drums, percussion

=== Technical personnel ===
- Brian Howes – producer, mixing
- Jay Van Poederooyen – engineering
- Ted Jensen – mastering
