= Damien Starkey =

American musician, songwriter and producer

Background information
- Born: Damien Joel Starkey; October 20, 1982 (age 43); Cincinnati, Ohio, U.S.
- Genres: Hard rock; alternative rock; orchestral; post-grunge; alternative metal; nu metal; country; hip hop
- Occupation: Musician
- Instruments: Bass; vocals; guitar
- Years active: 2000–present
- Labels: Elektra; Geffen; Warner Bros.
- Website: give2getmusic.com

Damien Joel Starkey (born October 20, 1982) is an American musician, songwriter and producer. He has played many roles in several bands, served as a vocalist for Society Red and Burn Season, bassist for Puddle of Mudd, and he also owns a company called Give 2 Get Music Group in which he is a music supervisor and composer for TV and film music. Damien has scored and wrote music for more than 100 TV shows and movies including American Reunion, Nitro Circus Movie, Freeheld, Pawn Stars, Bar Rescue, and Undercover Boss. As a producer he has written for and produced many notable artists including platinum selling bands Saliva, Daughtry and Avril Lavigne. The album "Project X" by Upchurch was co-written and produced by Damien and peaked on the album chart at No. 4 and No. 2 on the Hip Hop Chart. Damien was back on tour playing bass in Saliva for most of 2018. Starkey is also known for his accomplishments in other areas of business. Some of these include World Construction Inc, Songlinkr, Fanpass and The Shop Recordings.

== Biography ==
Starkey was born in Cincinnati, Ohio. He moved to Jacksonville, Florida, at the age of 2, and began playing guitar at the age of 9. He started the early version of Burn Season with Bobby Amaru, vocalist of Saliva, at the age of 15. By the age of 18 they had a multimillion-dollar record deal with Elektra Records. Currently he lives in Ponte Vedra Beach, Florida.

From 2007 to 2011 he was songwriter and singer for Society Red, with former Puddle of Mudd rhythm guitarist Adam Latiff and former lead guitarist of Puddle of Mudd Paul Phillips. Also in the band was Brad Stewart formerly of Shinedown who now plays in Saliva. In 2010, following the departure of bassist Doug Ardito, he joined Puddle of Mudd.

== Influences ==
Starkey has been quoted as saying that he grew up listening to a wide variety of genres. Many artists have influenced him, such as Guns N' Roses, Metallica, Dr. Dre, and Bad Company.

== Discography ==
=== Burn season ===
- Burn Season (2005)
- This Long Time Coming (2011)
- Sleepwalker [EP] (2012)

=== Society Red ===
- Society Red (2009)
- Welcome to the Show (2009)
- Let It Bleed (2011)

=== Music from the Nitro Circus Movie ===
- Soundtrack for Nitro Circus 3D Movie (2012)

== Filmography ==
=== TV shows ===
- Bar Rescue (Spike TV)
- Pawn Stars (History)
- Worlds Worst Tenants (Spike TV)
- Celebrity Wife Swap (ABC)
- The Quest (Indie)
- The Profit (CNBC)
- 60 Seconds to Sell (A&E)
- Country Bucks (A&E)
- Crazy Train (NBC)
- ESPN College Football (ABC)
- ESPN Nascar (ABC)
- ESPN Winter XGames (ABC)
- Jimmy Kimmel Live (ABC)
- Total Divas (E!)
- Strange Inheritance (FOX)
- Auction Hunters (Spike TV)
- Great Food Truck Race (Food Network)
- Lets Ask America (ABC)
- Wicked Flippah (Discovery)
- Gigilos (Showtime)
- Who Are You? (Nat Geographic)
- Challenge Me America (FOX)
- Polygamy USA (Nat Geo)
- My Teen Is Pregnant and So Am I (TLC)
- Honey Do (TLC)
- Triggers: Weapons That Changed The World (Military Channel)
- Meltdown (Nat Geo)
- The Numbers Game (Nat Geo)
- MMA Uncensored Live (Spike TV)
- The Great Food Truck Race (Nat Geo)
- Undercover Boss (CBS)

=== Films ===
- American Reunion
- Nitro Circus Movie 3D
- Game of Your Life
- Win Win
- Freeheld
- Secret Wedding
