= Heel Over Head =

2004 single by Puddle of Mudd

Single by Puddle of Mudd

from the album Life on Display
- Released: February 17, 2004
- Recorded: 2003
- Length: 3:58
- Label: Geffen
- Songwriters: Wes Scantlin; Doug Ardito; Paul Phillips; Greg Upchurch
- Producer: John Kurzweg

Puddle of Mudd singles chronology
"Away from Me" (2003)	"Heel Over Head" (2004)	"Spin You Around" (2004)

Music video
- "Heel Over Head" on YouTube

"Heel Over Head" is a song by the American rock band Puddle of Mudd. It was released on February 17, 2004 as the second single from their second major-label studio album, Life on Display. The single reached the Top 10 for Billboard's Mainstream Rock chart, peaking at No. 6 in May 2004.

== Background and production ==
"Heel Over Head" was written and recorded in 2003 during the sessions for Puddle of Mudd’s second major-label studio album, Life on Display. The song was credited to lead vocalist Wes Scantlin, bassist Doug Ardito, guitarist Paul Phillips, and drummer Greg Upchurch. Production was handled by John Kurzweg, who had also produced the band’s debut album, Come Clean two years earlier.

In an interview with Songfacts, Scantlin revealed that "Heel Over Head" was inspired by a personal experience from his early days in Los Angeles. He described how the lyrics were based on his interactions with a woman named Elena, a friend of producer Rick Rubin. According to Scantlin, Elena would visit his house, flirt with him, and tease him, but never let the relationship progress further. The song reflects the emotional tension and frustration from that situation.

The single was officially released on February 17, 2004, as the second single from Life on Display through Geffen Records. A music video was produced to promote the track, featuring the band performing alongside narrative sequences that mirrored the song’s themes. The video received airplay on outlets such as MTV2 and Fuse. "Heel Over Head" was promoted to U.S. rock radio formats, where it charted on the Mainstream Rock, Alternative Airplay, Active Rock, and Heritage Rock charts.

== Content ==
"Heel Over Head" explores the emotional fallout of a long-term relationship breakup. The song’s narrator expresses frustration and exhaustion toward a former partner, reflected in lyrics that depict the act of ending the relationship and asking the ex to leave. The phrase "heel over head" contrasts with the familiar expression "head over heels" symbolizing disillusionment rather than infatuation. Imagery such as "jet black sky is painted white again" conveys a reversal of perspective, while lines like "You don't save me or hear me or touch me or break me" highlight feelings of neglect and emotional detachment after enduring the relationship over time.

== Release and promotion ==
Following the release of their new album's lead single Away from Me in October 2003, the band followed up with "Heel Over Head" releasing as its second single from Life on Display on February 7, 2004. The single would be accompanied by an official music video that was directed by Carlos Arguello, which would premiere in early 2004.

== Charts ==
=== Weekly charts ===
Weekly chart performance for "Heel Over Head"
Chart (2004)	Peak position
US Bubbling Under Hot 100 (Billboard)	16
US Alternative Airplay (Billboard)	10
US Mainstream Rock (Billboard)	6

=== Year-end charts ===
Year-end chart performance for "Heel Over Head"
Chart (2004)	Position
US Mainstream Rock Tracks (Billboard)	36
US Modern Rock Tracks (Billboard)	56

== Track listing ==
No.	Title	Writer(s)	Length
1.	"Heel Over Head"	Wes Scantlin; Doug Ardito; Paul Phillips; Greg Upchurch	3:58
Total length:			3:58

== Personnel ==
- Wes Scantlin – lead vocals, rhythm guitar, songwriting
- Paul Phillips – lead guitar, songwriting
- Doug Ardito – bass, backing vocals, songwriting
- Greg Upchurch – drums, percussion, songwriting

=== Technical personnel ===
- John Kurzweg – producer, mixing
- Randy Staub – mixing
- Ted Jensen – mastering
- Brian Virtue – engineering
