= Livin' on Borrowed Time =

2008 single by Puddle of Mudd

Single by Puddle of Mudd

from the album Famous
- Released: August 5, 2008
- Recorded: 2006–2007
- Genre: Post-grunge; hard rock
- Length: 3:03
- Label: Geffen
- Songwriters: Wes Scantlin; Christian Stone
- Producers: Bill Stevenson; Wes Scantlin; Doug Ardito; Jason Livermore; Jack Joseph Puig

Puddle of Mudd singles chronology
"We Don't Have to Look Back Now" (2008)	"Livin' on Borrowed Time" (2008)	"Spaceship" (2009)

Music video
- "Livin' on Borrowed Time" on YouTube

"Livin' on Borrowed Time" is a song by the American rock band Puddle of Mudd. It was released as a single on August 5, 2008, as the fourth and final single from the band's third studio album, Famous (2007).

== Background and release ==
"Livin' On Borrowed Time" was written by singer Wes Scantlin and lead guitarist Christian Stone during the recording sessions for the band's third studio album, Famous. The sessions took place at various points in 2006 and 2007, following a period of lineup changes and pressure to deliver a commercially successful follow-up to 2003’s Life on Display. During the early stages of production, Scantlin originally wanted to title the album Livin' On Borrowed Time after the song, feeling it captured the tone of the band’s struggles and mindset at the time. However, the title was changed at the last minute to align with the lead single, Famous—a decision that Scantlin later expressed clear disdain for in interviews.

The album’s production involved multiple studios and producers, but "Livin' On Borrowed Time" was specifically produced by Bill Stevenson and Jason Livermore, with Scantlin and bass player Doug Ardito credited as co-producers. Stevenson and Livermore brought a rawer, heavier edge to the track compared to the more polished, radio-friendly direction of much of the album.

"Livin' on Borrowed Time" was issued to radio as the fourth and what would be the final single from Famous in August 2008. Despite this, in a 2012 poll hosted by Loudwire, "Livin' On Borrowed Time" was voted the 10th best Puddle of Mudd song of all time.

On September 23, 2009 "Livin' On Borrowed Time" was featured in promos for the Season 5 episode of Criminal Minds titled 'Nameless, Faceless."

== Composition and sound ==
"Livin' On Borrowed Time" is a post-grunge and hard rock song featuring aggressive guitar riffs and a heavy, driving rhythm. The track is performed in Db Ab Db Gb Bb Eb tuning. The song opens with a series of hammer-ons and power chord progressions that establish a raw, energetic tone. Throughout the verses and chorus, the guitars alternate between palm-muted chugging and more open, distorted power chords while the outro revisits the central riff with additional dynamics that combine melodic hooks with a dense, hard-hitting arrangement.

== Charts ==
Chart (2008)	Peak position
U.S. Mainstream Rock Tracks (Billboard)	15
U.S. Modern Rock Tracks (Billboard)	40

== Critical reception ==
"Livin' On Borrowed Time" received largely negative reviews from critics. A staff writer for Rate Your Music described the track as "particularly, uniquely horrible," criticizing it as one of the heaviest songs the band had released stating they "fall flat on their faces with it," while also criticizing Scantlin's vocal performance, noting his attempts at lower notes sounded "shrill, annoying and painful" and described the bridge as a "half-screamed, half-rapped," also criticizing the lyrics as some of the band's weakest before concluded with labeling it "worse than mediocre".

Gallagher of Debaser also offered a critical perspective, referring to "Livin' On Borrowed Time" as representative of the band "selling out" in an effort to widen their audience, ultimately labeled the track—and its album overall—as among the band’s weakest, suggesting it would only appeal to fans of more mainstream pop-rock acts.

Robert VerBruggen of antiMusic offered a somewhat more favorable view, acknowledging describing "Livin' On Borrowed Time" as it being Scantlin's best possible imitation of Layne Staley.

ChartJunkie.com ranked “Livin’ On Borrowed Time” position number 649 in their “Best Songs of 2008” list.

== Track listing ==
No.	Title	Writer(s)	Length
1.	"Livin' on Borrowed Time"	Wes Scantlin; Christian Stone	3:03
Total length:			3:03

== Personnel ==
All credits sourced from the songs metadata listed by the band.

- Wes Scantlin – lead vocals, rhythm guitar, songwriting
- Christian Stone – lead guitar, songwriting
- Doug Ardito – bass guitar
- Ryan Yerdon – drums

=== Technical personnel ===
- Howard Benson – producer
- Brian Howes – producer
- Bill Stevenson – producer
- Wes Scantlin – co-producer
- Doug Ardito – co-producer
- Jason Livermore – co-producer
- Jack Joseph Puig – mixing, engineer, co-producer
- Diamond R Graphics - graphic design
