= Burn Season =

American rock band

- Origin: Jacksonville, Florida, U.S.
- Genres: Alternative metal; post-grunge; nu metal
- Years active: 2001–2007; 2009–2012
- Labels: Elektra Records; Bieler Bros. Records
- Past members: Damien Starkey; Kevin Renwick; Brad Stewart; Bobby Amaru; Adam Silk; Roger David; Tim Nold

Burn Season was an American rock band from Jacksonville, Florida, formed by Damien Starkey and Bobby Amaru in 1998 under the name Smakt Down. The name changed to Burn Season upon signing their record deal with Elektra Records shortly after high school graduation in 2001. The band released 3 albums. Their final lineup consisted of Damien Starkey on vocals, Kevin Renwick on guitar, Brad Stewart on bass and Bobby Amaru on drums.

The group initially signed with Elektra Records to record and release their debut album. However, after business mergers left the band without a label, they eventually found a home with Bieler Bros. Records, releasing their debut album in 2005 before splitting up two years later. While several of the members have since found success with other projects, the band has reunited sporadically since their initial breakup in 2007.

== History ==
=== Early years and signing with Elektra Records (2001–2003) ===
Formed in 2001, Burn Season was started by lead vocalist Damien Starkey and drummer Bobby Amaru. Their earliest demos were recorded at the Music Factory studio in Jacksonville Beach, Florida, with Damien Starkey also handling guitar duties and studio owner Michael Ray FitzGerald filling in on bass.

Later, the duo recorded a set of demos at the Hole of The Pigeon studio in Jacksonville, with production assistance from Limp Bizkit's Sam Rivers. Impressed with what he heard, Rivers put the band into contact with his Limp Bizkit bandmate Fred Durst, who ran his own record label in Flawless Records.

The interest from Flawless Records brought more attention to the band, who started receiving offers from other labels in what became a bidding war. Eventually, the members, now consisting of Adam Silk on bass and Kevin Renwick on guitar, decided to sign with Elektra Records. While no specifics have been released, it was reportedly an obscenely large deal.

=== Label changeups, debut album and breakup (2004–2007) ===
Burn Season set to work recording its debut album, recording in Los Angeles with producers Bob Marlette and Tim Palmer. However, the album never ended up seeing the light of day, as Elektra Records were merged with Atlantic in 2004. This led to Burn Season, along with many other acts signed to Elektra at the time, finding themselves without a label.

Later in 2004, South Florida-based independent label Bieler Bros. Records came to the rescue and signed the band. Bieler purchased the rights to four songs from Burn Season's unreleased Elektra debut and provided studio time for the band record eight new ones. On signing the band, Bieler Bros. Records CEO Jason Bieler stated:

"This band clearly had the talent and the songs to be huge. As Elektra folded...this was a case of throwing the baby out with the bath water; decisions were made on budgets and interoffice politics, not on music. We know they're a great rock band and if it takes us three weeks or three years to break them, we're ready!"

Once the album was completed, the band hit the road to build anticipation for the upcoming release and toured with Skindred, Nonpoint, Sevendust and Papa Roach. The song Carry On was released as a promotional single and received airplay on rock radio stations. After several delays, Burn Season released their self-titled debut on October 11, 2005.

Following the release of their debut album, the band ultimately struggled to secure touring opportunities, leading to a period of frustration with the music industry. In an interview in 2009, lead singer Damien Starkey reflected on this period, commenting "it was like there was a line to get on tour, and we had our $50,000 check. But so did every other band."

Determined to not give up and continue pushing on, the band regrouped in Jacksonville and set to work on a second album, announcing their intentions via MySpace. Two songs from the demo sessions were uploaded to the band's PureVolume page, but can no longer be heard. Updates from the band became few-and-far-between, until lead singer Damien Starkey made an announcement in early May, 2007, stating:

"I'm sorry to break the news to everyone, but we have officially broken up. After six years, two record deals, and over 40 recorded songs we feel that the band has run its course. All of us are still great friends and have no animosity within the group but have come to a point where it makes more sense to pursue other projects."

The band played their final show on May 25, 2007. In a fitting end for the band, they played at the first venue where the band made their live debut in Jacksonville, called Jack Rabbits.

=== Post-breakup (2007–2008) ===
Immediately after the breakup of the band, lead singer Damien Starkey formed the band Society Red with former Puddle of Mudd members Adam Latiff and Paul Phillips, as well as former Shinedown bassist Brad Stewart. The band independently released two albums between 2007 and 2011.

Drummer Bobby Amaru formed the band Amaru, with help from Sam Rivers of Limp Bizkit. However, instead of playing drums Amaru fronted the band as lead singer. The band released an album in 2007.

Guitarist Kevin Renwick relocated to Los Angeles.

=== Sporadic reunions (2009–2020) ===
In 2009, Starkey received an unexpected phone call from Bieler Bros. Records, asking if Burn Season would be interested in recording another album. After a lengthy conference call between former members of Burn Season and the label, the band ultimately decided to reunite. Longtime bassist Adam Silk was replaced with Brad Stewart, who played with Starkey in Society Red and Amaru in Amaru. The band played their first reunion show at Freebird Live in Jacksonville, Florida.

In 2011, the band released their second album, This Long Time Coming. Interestingly, the album was released without the involvement of Bieler Bros. Records, despite the label being the ones who sparked the reunion and creation of the second album. Some of the material on the album was reportedly written for their unreleased album with Elektra records. Starkey later reported that the album "sold well".

In 2012, the band released an EP entitled Sleepwalker, which included songs the band had written before their initial breakup in 2007. As with This Long Time Coming, the band opted to release the album independently. The song The Truth was released as a single.

On January 5, 2012, drummer Bobby Amaru was announced as the new lead singer of Saliva. This would ultimately prove to be a fatal blow for the band, as a crucial core member was suddenly inundated with a hectic schedule due to his new commitments.

In a 2014 interview, Amaru was asked about whether he still worked with Burn Season. He stated: "Sometimes, we still write together and things like that." Despite this, the band hasn't released any new music or played any shows since 2012.

On July 17, 2016, lead singer Damien Starkey tweeted a hint at possible new Burn Season music.

In 2018, Starkey and Amaru reunited to form the supergroup Sleepkillers, featuring Starkey on vocals, Amaru on drums, Limp Bizkit bassist Sam Rivers on bass and former Puddle of Mudd (and Society Red) guitarist Adam Latiff on guitar. The group independently released their self-titled debut album on March 1, 2019.

The 2020 US lockdowns caused by the COVID-19 pandemic inspired the band to get together once again to work on yet more new music. Aside from a post on the band's Facebook page on April 10, 2020 and another on their Instagram the next day, no reports have surfaced since.

On September 21, 2020, Burn Season released their self-titled album to streaming platforms. Interestingly, the release doesn't associate itself with Bieler Bros. Records, who originally distributed the album. Instead, the band's name is listed as the record label. Also, the album title features a typo in being listed as Burn Season 1. It is unknown if this was intentional or indicates a remaster.

== Members ==
Current

- Damien Starkey – vocals
- Kevin Renwick – guitar
- Brad Stewart – bass
- Bobby Amaru – drums

Former

- Adam Silk – bass (2003–2007)
- Roger David – bass (2002–2003)
- Tim Nold – guitar (2002–2003)

== Discography ==
- Burn Season (2005)
- This Long Time Coming (2011)
- Sleepwalker EP (2012)
