= Famous (Puddle of Mudd song) =

Single by Puddle of Mudd

from the album Famous
- Released: May 21, 2007
- Genre: Alternative metal, hard rock
- Length: 3:16
- Label: Interscope
- Songwriters: Wesley Scantlin, Brian Howes and Doug Ardito

Puddle of Mudd singles chronology
"Spin You Around" (2004)	"Famous" (2007)	"Psycho" (2007)

Audio video
- "Famous" on YouTube

"Famous" is a song by American rock band Puddle of Mudd, released as the first single from their third studio album of the same name. The song was sent out to rock radio on May 11, 2007 and was officially released on May 21.

In the song, lead singer Wes Scantlin, sings about wanting to be famous, for the perks that come along with that life. It has drawn comparisons to Nickelback's "Rockstar" because "Rockstar" is also about wanting to achieve celebrity status.

== Single ==
=== Track listings ===
Single

No.	Title	Length
1.	"Radio edit" (Wesley Scantlin, Brian Howes, Doug Ardito)	3:15
2.	"Album version"	3:13

EP

No.	Title	Length
1.	"Famous"	3:15
2.	"Merry Go Round" (Scantlin)	2:42
3.	"Blurry (acoustic version)" (Scantlin)	5:11

== Charts ==
=== Weekly charts ===
Weekly chart performance for "Famous"
Chart (2007)	Peak position
Canada Hot 100 (Billboard)	97
Canada Rock (Billboard)	6
US Bubbling Under Hot 100 (Billboard)	18
US Alternative Airplay (Billboard)	20
US Mainstream Rock (Billboard)	2

=== Year-end charts ===
2007 year-end chart performance for "Famous"
Chart (2007)	Position
US Mainstream Rock Songs (Billboard)	9
