= Adam Latiff =

American guitarist, songwriter, and vocalist

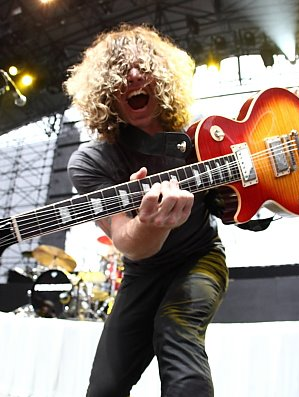
- Adam Latiff performing with Puddle of Mudd in 2011

Background information
- Born: March 24, 1979 (age 46); Orlando, Florida, United States
- Genres: Hard rock, alternative rock, post-grunge, grunge, progressive rock, rockabilly
- Occupation: Musician
- Instruments: Guitar, vocals
- Years active: 2002–present
- Website: Puddle of Mudd Official Site

Adam Latiff (born March 24, 1979) is an American guitarist, songwriter, and vocalist for a number of bands, most notable for Puddle of Mudd. He started his career in bands such as Devereux and was a touring guitar player for Eve to Adam until December 2014. Latiff is the lead vocalist and lead guitarist for a national Nirvana tribute band called Heart Shaped Box, and is also the lead vocalist for Vanilla Women, which features former members of Shinedown, Cold and Puddle of Mudd.

== Career ==
Latiff was friends with Puddle of Mudd's former lead guitarist, Paul Phillips whom he knew from the Jacksonville, Florida, local music scene. He had formed the band Society Red with Phillips and Damien Starkey, which was active from 2008 to 2011. When lead-singer Wes Scantlin discovered that he had problems sharing vocals duties with playing guitar at the same time, the band decided to hire a rhythm guitarist for the band. Latiff joined Puddle of Mudd in April 2011 toured with them until June 2012. He appears on no official releases by the band. In December 2013 it was announced that he had joined Eve to Adam.

== Influences ==
He cites groups such as Pink Floyd, Thin Lizzy, Foo Fighters, and Nirvana as influences and is inspired by David Gilmour, Kurt Cobain, B. B. King, and Eric Clapton. His interest in grunge, brought him to start his own Nirvana tribute band, called Heart Shaped Box.

He uses Gibson Les Paul, Fender Stratocaster, Telecaster and Epiphone Les Paul electric and Yari acoustic guitars.
