= Keep It Together =

Keep It Together may refer to:

- Keep It Together (album), an album by Guster, or the title song
- "Keep It Together" (Madonna song)
- "Keep It Together" (Puddle of Mudd song)
