= Cellophane (band) =

American alternative metal/rock band

Cellophane was an alternative metal/rock band from California. They released a single eponymous album in 1997.

== History ==
Cellophane started in 1995 after singer-songwriter Shannon Crawford convinced Ross Robinson to produce a demo recording of some of his songs. Robinson agreed after hearing a demo previously made by Crawford, and suggested that bass player Doug Ardito, drummer Mark Bistany, and guitar player John Chase work with Crawford. Upon finishing the recordings, the band played shows in the Los Angeles area and shopped the demos, ultimately signing with Virgin Records.

After a small club tour, an appearance on the 1996 Ozzfest bill followed, and Virgin suggested that producer Howard Benson record the début album, Cellophane (1997).

The band toured in support of the album, opening for varied bands such as Korn, Creed, Rage Against the Machine, The Warped Tour, Sevendust, L7, Jimmy Eat World and the Nixons, among others.

After a year on the road supporting the album, Cellophane returned to Los Angeles and started preparing to record a second album. During pre-production, Crawford decided to go on as a solo artist and the band was dissolved.

Ardito went on to play bass for Vanilla Ice on his hardcore music flavored comeback and then went on to play for Puddle of Mudd, Mark Bistany went on to start Otep and then worked with Ardito in Puddle of Mudd. John Chase recorded for Michael Jackson and others. In 2007 Crawford formed Monster in the Machine, after working as a visual artist. Celophane's song Down was used in the soundtrack of the 1997 movie Wishmaster.

== Band members ==
- Shannon Crawford (vocals)
- Doug Ardito (Bass)
- Mark Bistany (Drums)
- John Chase (Guitar)

== Albums ==
- Cellophane (1997, Virgin Records)
