= We Don't Have to Look Back Now =

Single by Puddle of Mudd

from the album Famous
- Released: May 13, 2008
- Recorded: 2005–2007
- Genre: Alternative rock, post-grunge
- Length: 3:34
- Label: Geffen
- Songwriters: Max Collins, Tony Fagenson
- Producers: Tony Fagenson, Jack Joseph Puig, Jason Livermore, Bill Stevenson, Puddle of Mudd

Puddle of Mudd singles chronology
"Psycho" (2007)	"We Don't Have to Look Back Now" (2008)	"Livin' on Borrowed Time" (2008)

Music video
- "We Don't Have to Look Back Now" on YouTube

"We Don't Have to Look Back Now" is a song by the American rock band Puddle of Mudd. It was released as the third single from their fourth album Famous. The single was released to radio stations and charted on the alternative and mainstream rock charts in Billboard magazine. It also charted on the Top 40 Singles Chart in New Zealand at No. 32.

== Background ==
The song, which was written by Tony Fagenson and Max Collins, was originally intended to be recorded by Eve 6

In an interview with the Journal Star, singer Wes Scantlin added that "It was really nice to go into the studio with those guys and really, really super fast get it done. (Because) those guys are like professional guys and (expletive)"

== Music video ==
The music video was shot in Los Angeles and shows lead singer Wes Scantlin singing forwards, while the video is playing backwards. During the video it shows a couple, with another girl having an interest in the boyfriend. The video concludes with the boyfriend leaving his girlfriend for the girl more suited to him.

== Charts ==
Weekly chart performance for "We Don't Have to Look Back Now"
Chart (2008)	Peak position
New Zealand (Recorded Music NZ)	32
US Adult Pop Airplay (Billboard)	21
US Alternative Airplay (Billboard)	33
US Mainstream Rock (Billboard)	31

=== Year-end charts ===
Year-end chart performance for "We Don't Have to Look Back Now"
Chart (2008)	Position
US Mainstream Rock	94
