= Re:(disc)overed =

Studio album of cover songs by Puddle of Mudd
- Released: August 30, 2011
- Recorded: January 2011–February 2011
- Studio: The Bomb Shelter
- Genres: Post-grunge, alternative rock, hard rock
- Length: 51:26
- Label: Arms Division
- Producer: Bill Appleberry

Puddle of Mudd chronology
Volume 4: Songs in the Key of Love & Hate (2009)	Re:(disc)overed (2011)	Welcome to Galvania (2019)

Re:(disc)overed

Studio album of cover songs by Puddle of Mudd
- Released: August 30, 2011
- Recorded: January 2011–February 2011
- Studio: The Bomb Shelter
- Genres: Post-grunge; alternative rock; hard rock
- Length: 51:26
- Label: Arms Division
- Producer: Bill Appleberry

Puddle of Mudd chronology
Volume 4: Songs in the Key of Love & Hate (2009)	Re:(disc)overed (2011)	Welcome to Galvania (2019)

Singles from Re:(disc)overed
- 1. "Gimme Shelter" Released: August 2, 2011

Professional ratings
Review scores
Source	Rating
AllMusic	2.5/5 stars
[&].com	8.5/10 stars

Re:(disc)overed is a cover album by American rock band Puddle of Mudd. It was released on August 30, 2011, on Arms Division Records. It is the band's final album to feature longtime members Paul Philips on guitar and Doug Ardito on bass.

== Background ==
The band began recording the album in March 2011 and commenced within a three-week period. After touring and rehearsals for a fifth studio effort left the band mentally and physically exhausted, the idea for a cover record came into play. The choice of songs was whittled down from 30 candidates and eventually led to the recording of 15 tracks.

== Track listing ==
No.	Title	Writer(s)	Original artist	Length
1.	"Gimme Shelter"	Mick Jagger & Keith Richards	Rolling Stones	5:05
2.	"Old Man"	Neil Young	Neil Young	5:06
3.	"T.N.T."	Angus Young, Malcolm Young & Bon Scott	AC/DC	3:55
4.	"Stop Draggin' My Heart Around" (Duet with BC Jean)	Tom Petty & Mike Campbell	Stevie Nicks & Tom Petty	4:07
5.	"The Joker"	Steve Miller, Eddie Curtis & Ahmet Ertegün	Steve Miller Band	4:08
6.	"Everybody Wants You"	Billy Squier	Billy Squier	3:36
7.	"Rocket Man"	Elton John & Bernie Taupin	Elton John	6:05
8.	"All Right Now"	Andy Fraser & Paul Rodgers	Free	5:35
9.	"Shooting Star"	Paul Rodgers	Bad Company	5:17
10.	"D'yer Mak'er"	Jimmy Page, Robert Plant, John Bonham & John Paul Jones	Led Zeppelin	4:19
11.	"Funk #49"	Joe Walsh, Jim Fox & Dale Peters	James Gang	4:13
Total length:				51:26

=== iTunes/European Edition bonus tracks ===
No.	Title	Writer(s)	Original Artist	Length
12.	"Cocaine"	J.J. Cale	J.J. Cale	3:44
13.	"With a Little Help from My Friends"	John Lennon & Paul McCartney	The Beatles	6:30

== Personnel ==
- Wesley Scantlin – lead vocals, rhythm guitar
- Paul Phillips – lead guitar, production
- Doug Ardito – bass, production
- Jeff Bowders – drums
- Duane Betts – guitar
- Corey Britz – bass, Lap Steel guitar
- Justin Durrigo – guitar
- Bill Appleberry – piano, B3 Organ, all organs

Guest vocalists

- BC Jean, Gia Ciambotti and Kim Yarbrough

=== Production ===
- Bill Appleberry – engineer, producer, mixing
- Eric Colvin – engineer
- Tim Hawkins – engineer
- Navon Weisberg – assistant engineer
- Peter Doell – mastering
- Jared Hirshland – Pro-Tools, conductor

== Charts ==
Chart (2011)	Peak position
US Billboard 200	96
US Independent Albums (Billboard)	11
US Top Alternative Albums (Billboard)	17
US Top Current Album Sales (Billboard)	89
US Top Hard Rock Albums (Billboard)	5
US Top Rock Albums (Billboard)	21
