= Away from Me =

Single by Puddle of Mudd

from the album Life on Display
- Released: October 21, 2003
- Length: 4:00
- Songwriter: Wes Scantlin
- Producer: Puddle of Mudd

Puddle of Mudd singles chronology
"She Hates Me" (2002)	"Away from Me" (2003)	"Heel Over Head" (2004)

Music video
- "Away from Me" on YouTube

"Away from Me" is a song by the American rock band Puddle of Mudd. It was released as the first single from their third studio album Life on Display. Wes Scantlin mentioned in an interview with VH1 that "Away from Me" was written about how he was lied to and deceived in a relationship.

A music video was created for the song, and can be found on the Life on Display CD when inserted into a computer's CD drive. The song is also one of Puddle of Mudd's most successful songs, charting the highest of any song on the Life on Display album. It hit #1 on the Mainstream Rock Tracks chart, where it stayed for three weeks, in addition to reaching #5 on the Modern Rock Tracks chart, and #72 on the Billboard Hot 100. It was featured in an episode of The O.C. in 2004.

== Single ==
=== Track listings ===
US Promo Only

No.	Title	Length
1.	"Away From Me (Radio Edit)" (Wesley Scantlin)	4:00

Europe Promo Only

No.	Title	Length
1.	"Away From Me (Radio Edit)"	4:00
2.	"Away From Me (Album Version)"	3:58

UK Limited Edition 7" Blue Vinyl

Side A
No.	Title	Length
1.	"Away From Me (Radio Edit)"	4:00

Side B
No.	Title	Length
1.	"Life Ain't Fair"	3:45

UK Maxi Single

No.	Title	Length
1.	"Away From Me (Radio Edit)"	4:00
2.	"Bleed (Non-LP Track)" (Scantlin, From The Punisher: The Album)	3:37
3.	"Blurry (Live Acoustic Version)"	4:11
4.	"Away From Me (Video)" (Director: Dean Karr)	3:59

UK Enhanced Single

No.	Title	Length
1.	"Away From Me"	4:01
2.	"Bleed (Non-LP Track)" (Scantlin, From The Punisher: The Album)	3:37
3.	"Control (Acoustic Version)" (Scantlin)	4:07
4.	"Away From Me (Video)"	3:59

== Charts ==
Weekly chart performance for "Away from Me"
Chart (2003–2004)	Peak position
Australia (ARIA)	76
Scotland Singles (OCC)	66
UK Singles (OCC)	55
UK Rock & Metal (OCC)	9
US Billboard Hot 100	72
US Alternative Airplay (Billboard)	5
US Mainstream Rock (Billboard)	1

=== Year-end charts ===
Year-end chart performance for "Away From Me"
Chart (2004)	Position
US Mainstream Rock Tracks (Billboard)	14
US Modern Rock Tracks (Billboard)	44

== See also ==
- List of Billboard Mainstream Rock number-one songs of the 2000s
