= Psycho (Puddle of Mudd song) =

Single by Puddle of Mudd

from the album Famous
- Released: October 2, 2007
- Genre: Alternative rock
- Length: 3:31
- Label: Interscope
- Songwriter: Wes Scantlin
- Producer: Howard Benson

Puddle of Mudd singles chronology
"Famous" (2007)	"Psycho" (2007)	"We Don't Have to Look Back Now" (2008)

Music video
- "Psycho" on YouTube

"Psycho" is a song by the American rock band Puddle of Mudd. It was released as the second single from their fourth studio album Famous on October 2, 2007, but was available for digital download on iTunes on September 18, 2007.

== Music video ==
The music video was shot at the famed Psycho section of the Studio Tour in Universal Studios Hollywood (from the movie of the same name), and premiered on Google music on October 8, 2007. The video is an homage to various "classic" horror movies, and incorporates several characters and elements from those movies.

The video starts with a full moon, while lead singer Wes Scantlin is driving a car at night with a group of cheerleaders and jocks, parodying the typical teenage victims in horror movies. As they are driving a man jumps out of the woods onto the road, and they hit him. Upon further inspection it is seen that the man is Michael Myers from the Halloween movies. As the group gathers around him to see if he's all right, Leatherface from The Texas Chainsaw Massacre movies jumps out and grabs two of the girls, taking them back into the woods without the rest of them knowing. Michael Myers then proceeds to get up, revealing he was only pretending to be hurt, and begins chasing the group with a razor sharp machete. The remaining members of the group runs from the killers until they come to The Bates Motel from the movie Psycho. They run to one of the rooms, taking refuge in it, while in the process disrupting a couple who happen to be Kid Rock and Pamela Anderson making cameos in the video.

In the room, Wes picks up a note on the bedside table that says, "I know what you did last album," referencing I Know What You Did Last Summer. Then one of the girls decides to take a shower. The silhouette of a man is seen through the shower curtain with a knife, he opens the curtain to the shower, with the girl proceeding to scream, mimicking the famous shower scene from the movie Psycho. It is then shown that it is just one of the jocks with a banana, playing a prank on the girl. Wes and the jock (played by Doug Ardito) laugh, and throw a banana peel into the shower. The girl does not see it, and slips on it, banging her head against the wall and killing her in the process. The group seeing this, flees the room, except for one who is shown being sucked into a static television, parodying Poltergeist. Wes and his girlfriend run in a different direction than the others, but both groups make their way towards the famous Bates house. An imitation of Kanye West is seen outside the house banging on the window in an angry fashion. The group of remaining jocks and cheerleaders climb the stairs to the Bates house from Psycho, but are met by Paris Hilton at the top, who kicks them down the stairs. Wes and his girlfriend enter the Bates house, only to see an old woman sitting in a chair. The woman is revealed to be Wes himself, dressed up as an old lady, again referencing the ending to Psycho. Wes is then shown realizing "I'm the one who is/the schizophrenic psycho."

== Chart performance ==
The song debuted on the Billboard Mainstream Rock Tracks chart at number 32 and reached number 1, remaining there for 9 weeks. It marked their fifth single to top the chart and their first in 5 years. It also debuted on the Modern Rock Tracks chart at number 8; it reached number 1 becoming their second song to do so on the chart. It debuted on the Billboard Hot 100 at number 100 and peaked at number 67, becoming their first song to chart on the Hot 100 since "Away from Me" in 2003. It debuted on the Canadian Hot 100 at number 90 and has since peaked at number 56, beating the band's previous single, "Famous," which debuted and peaked at number 97. It also charted on the Billboard Pop 100; it peaked at number 75. Despite its being released as a single in 2007, Fuse rated this song as the best Modern Rock song of 2008. As of 2010, "Psycho" is the band's second best-selling single in the U.S., behind only the 2002 single "Blurry", with 700,000 copies sold.

== Charts ==
=== Weekly charts ===
Weekly chart performance for "Psycho"
Chart (2007–2008)	Peak position
Canada Hot 100 (Billboard)	56
Canada Rock (Billboard)	3
US Billboard Hot 100	67
US Alternative Airplay (Billboard)	1
US Mainstream Rock (Billboard)	1
US Pop 100 (Billboard)	75

=== Year-end charts ===
Year-end chart performance for "Psycho"
Chart (2008)	Position
US Alternative Airplay (Billboard)	4
US Mainstream Rock (Billboard)	1

== Certifications ==
Certifications for "Psycho"
Region	Certification	Certified units/sales
New Zealand (RMNZ)	Gold	15,000^{‡}
^{‡} Sales+streaming figures based on certification alone.
