= Stoned (Puddle of Mudd song) =

Single by Puddle of Mudd

from the album Volume 4: Songs in the Key of Love & Hate
- Released: March 8, 2010
- Recorded: 2009
- Length: 3:30
- Label: Geffen, Interscope
- Songwriter: Wes Scantlin
- Producer: Brian Howes

Puddle of Mudd singles chronology
"Shook Up the World" (2010)	"Stoned" (2010)	"Keep It Together" (2010)

Music video
- "Stoned" on YouTube

"Stoned" is the second single off the album Volume 4: Songs in the Key of Love & Hate by rock band Puddle of Mudd. The song was available for download on iTunes and online music retail sites on December 8, 2009, and released to radio on March 8, 2010. Stoned was the number one most added track at Active Rock as soon as it impacted radio, with 60+ new stations coming aboard in a week. The song was written by Puddle of Mudd front-man Wes Scantlin.

On March 25, 2010, Puddle of Mudd made an appearance on NBC's The Tonight Show with Jay Leno and played "Stoned".

== EP ==
No.	Title	Length
1.	"Acoustic version"	3:32
2.	"Radio edit (clean)"	3:30
3.	"Album version"	3:30

== Music video ==
The band finished shooting the music video, which premiered on April 27, 2010 on MTV2 and mtvU.

In the video, the band destroys an office, turning over desks and destroying computers. These scenes are inter cut with the band playing in a room with a blue backdrop. Near the end of the video, Wes kicks down one of the office walls, revealing the room with the blue backdrop behind it. At the very end of the video, Wes gives the peace sign with one hand and the middle finger with the other toward the camera.

== Chart performance ==
The song reached as high as number six on Billboard Hot Mainstream Rock Tracks chart, and number 22 on the Billboard Rock Songs chart. The song debuted on the Mister Bravo's Top 25-Monthly chart at number one in December 2009, and reached number one in January 2010, and re-claimed the top spot in May 2010.

== Charts ==
Chart (2010)	Peak position
U.S. Billboard Mainstream Rock Tracks	6
U.S. Billboard Rock Songs	22
U.S. Billboard Alternative Songs	33
U.S Billboard Canadian Rock	41

=== Year-end charts ===
Chart (2010)	Position
US Mainstream Rock (Billboard)	38
US Alternative Songs (Billboard)	81
