= Welcome to Galvania =

Studio album by Puddle of Mudd
- Released: September 13, 2019
- Recorded: 2014–2019
- Genre: Post-grunge
- Length: 41:00
- Label: Pavement
- Producer: Cameron Webb

Puddle of Mudd chronology
re:(disc)overed (2011)	Welcome to Galvania (2019)	Ubiquitous (2023)

Singles from Welcome to Galvania
- 1. "Uh Oh" Released: July 12, 2019; 2. "Go to Hell" Released: November 20, 2020; 3. "Just Tell Me" Released: July 9, 2021; 4. "My Kind of Crazy" Released: September 6, 2022

Professional ratings
Review scores
Source	Rating
AllMusic	2.5/5 stars
Riff Magazine	positive
Ghost Cult	6/10
Maximum Volume	7/10

Welcome to Galvania is the seventh studio album by the American rock band Puddle of Mudd. Released on September 13, 2019 via Pavement Entertainment, it marked the band's first new studio album of original songs in ten years, the last being 2009's Volume 4: Songs in the Key of Love & Hate and is their first full-length release since 2011's cover album Re:(disc)overed, marking the longest gap between albums releases in the band's existence.

Loudwire named it one of the 50 best rock albums of 2019.

== Background and release ==
After the group finished touring in support for their 2011 cover album re:(disc)overed, over the course of the next few years lead singer Wes Scantlin had multiple run-ins with the law and multiple arrests. These strings of bad behavior occurred during many shows too, some where Wes would not show at all or was too intoxicated to perform. The album's opening track "You Don't Know" is a 2019 re-recorded version of their 1994 debut single that released on their independently released seven-song EP, Stuck, the band's very first commercial release.

On September 21, 2014, the band released a new single titled "Piece of the Action" to digital outlets though the track had no official announcement from the band and zero support from them or any label.

On July 17, 2015, it was announced via Loudwire that the band was recording tracks for a new album at Grandmasters Studio with producer Cameron Webb.

From 2015 to 2017, the legal troubles and on stage meltdowns continued for Scantlin, in one instance leading the entire band to walk out on him.

In January 2018, the band finally revealed Scantlin had been in rehab for some months and was reportedly doing well and the band would resume touring once he was 100% level headed.

In August 2018, it was announced that Wes was six months sober and that Puddle of Mudd would be headlining "The Resurrection Tour" featuring bands Tantric and Saliva.

It was reported via Blabbermouth in December 2018 that Puddle of Mudd would return with a "really badass" new album in 2019.

On July 12, 2019, it was announced the new album would be called Welcome to Galvania and that the lead single titled "Uh Oh" was available for purchase.

== Track listing ==
No.	Title	Writer(s)	Length
1.	"You Don't Know"	Wesley Scantlin; Jimmy Allen	3:43
2.	"Uh Oh"	Scantlin; Colin Roberts; Katrina Anne Noorbergen; Lee Anna McCollum	3:28
3.	"Go to Hell"	Scantlin	4:03
4.	"Diseased Almost"	Scantlin	3:42
5.	"My Kind of Crazy"	Scantlin; McCollum; Doug Ardito; Christian Stone	3:52
6.	"Time of Our Lives"	Scantlin; Ardito	3:44
7.	"Sunshine"	Scantlin	4:04
8.	"Just Tell Me"	Scantlin; Ardito	4:07
9.	"Kiss It All Goodbye"	Scantlin	3:30
10.	"Slide Away"	Scantlin; Tony Bataglia	3:18
11.	"Uh Oh" (Clean version, labeled as "Come Clean Version")	Scantlin; Roberts; Noorbergen; McCollum	3:30
Total length:			41:00

== Personnel ==
=== Puddle of Mudd ===
- Wes Scantlin – lead vocals, guitar
- Matt Fuller – lead guitar, backing vocals
- Michael John Adams – bass guitar, backing vocals
- Dave Moreno – drums, backing vocals

=== Additional personnel ===
- Cameron Webb – producer, engineer, mixing
- Sergio Chavez – assistant engineer
- Nicole Simon – production manager
- Jason Zarnowski – mastering
- Blake Scantlin, Reuben "Bonyx" Armstrong – photo art
- Brittany Nawara – layout
- Tim King – A&R
- Mark Nawara – production supervisor
- Adam Gerber – management associate

=== Locations ===
- Recorded at Maple Studios, Costa Mesa, CA & Grandmaster Recorders, Hollywood, CA
- Mixed at Maple Studios, Costa Mesa, CA
- Mastered at T.V.R. Recording Studios

== Charts ==
Chart (2019)	Peak position
US Independent Albums (Billboard)	30
US Top Album Sales (Billboard)	84
US Top Current Album Sales (Billboard)	65
