= Brad Stewart =

American musician (born 1974)

- Born: November 19, 1974 (age 51)
- Origin: Jacksonville, Florida, U.S.
- Genres: Southern rock; hard rock; alternative metal; post-grunge; nu metal
- Occupations: Musician; songwriter
- Instrument: Bass guitar
- Years active: 2001–present
- Member of: Saliva
- Formerly of: Shinedown; Fuel; Burn Season

Brad Stewart (born November 19, 1974) is an American bassist, best known for his work with hard rock bands Shinedown and Fuel. He now plays in Saliva, Society Red, and Burn Season.

== Career ==
=== Shinedown ===
Stewart was the second member to join Shinedown after vocalist Brent Smith. They met through a mutual friend of Smith’s A&R contact, local Jacksonville producer Pete Thornton.

In March 2007, it was reported that Stewart had left Shinedown. No official statement was made, leaving fans to speculate. On September 20, 2008 on his newly created MySpace account, Stewart posted a lengthy blog that provided information about his time with Shinedown and his controversial departure. He wrote of tensions between band members during the recording of Shinedown's second album, and stated "the reason I was given was that 'I never got over what happened in the studio and during the recording of Us and Them'."

=== Amaru ===
In 2007, Stewart joined the pop rock band Amaru, the brainchild of former Burn Season drummer and current Saliva lead singer Bobby Amaru.

=== Society Red ===
In June 2008, Stewart made the decision to join the rock/grunge/alternative band Society Red, which features another former member of Burn Season, vocalist Damien Starkey. At this time, he also parted ways with Amaru.

=== Fuel ===
In March 2010, it was announced that Stewart has replaced Jeff Abercrombie in the Fuel revival band Re-Fueled. In April 2010, it was officially announced that Re-Fueled lineup would be using the name of Fuel and going on a world tour starting in April 2010.

=== Songwriting ===
Stewart co-wrote Puddle of Mudd's hit "Control", and also contributed to a selection of Shinedown's material, namely "I Dare You".
