= Famous (Puddle of Mudd album) =

2007 studio album by Puddle of Mudd

Studio album by Puddle of Mudd
- Released: October 9, 2007
- Recorded: 2006–2007
- Genre: Post-grunge
- Length: 38:29
- Labels: Flawless; Geffen
- Producers: Howard Benson; Brian Howes; Wes Scantlin; Bill Stevenson; Jason Livermore; Jack Joseph Puig

Puddle of Mudd chronology
Life on Display (2003)	Famous (2007)	Volume 4: Songs in the Key of Love & Hate (2009)

Singles from Famous
- 1. "Famous" Released: May 21, 2007; 2. "Psycho" Released: September 25, 2007; 3. "We Don't Have to Look Back Now" Released: May 13, 2008; 4. "Livin' on Borrowed Time" Released: August 5, 2008

Famous

Studio album by Puddle of Mudd
- Released: October 9, 2007
- Recorded: 2006–2007
- Genre: Post-grunge
- Length: 38:29
- Labels: Flawless; Geffen
- Producers: Howard Benson; Brian Howes; Wes Scantlin; Bill Stevenson; Jason Livermore; Jack Joseph Puig

Puddle of Mudd chronology
Life on Display (2003)	Famous (2007)	Volume 4: Songs in the Key of Love & Hate (2009)

Singles from Famous
- 1. "Famous" Released: May 11, 2007; 2. "Psycho" Released: September 25, 2007; 3. "We Don't Have to Look Back Now" Released: May 13, 2008; 4. "Livin' on Borrowed Time" Released: August 5, 2008

Professional ratings
Review scores
Source	Rating
AllMusic	2.5/5 stars
Anti-music	2.5/5 stars

Famous is the third studio album by American rock band Puddle of Mudd, released on October 9, 2007 on Flawless Records. It was originally set to be released in May, but was pushed back to add more songs to the album.

The title track provided the album's lead single in May 2007. "Psycho", "We Don't Have to Look Back Now" and "" would follow in November, then May and August 2008. The album spawned four singles — "Famous", "Psycho", "We Don't Have to Look Back Now", and "Livin' on Borrowed Time".

Livin' on Borrowed Time

Famous debuted at number 27 on the U.S. Billboard 200, selling about 31,000 copies in its first week. The, album had sold around 363,000 copies in the United States.

== History ==
After the previous album was released, guitarists Paul Phillips and drummer Greg Upchurch left the band, being replaced by Christian Stone and Ryan Yerdon respectively. The two moved on to play for Operator and 3 Doors Down, respectively.

In early 2007, the album was in finishing stages with producer Bill Stevenson. The band had written 60 to 70 songs, eventually narrowing it down to just a few tracks. Originally, the album was due out in July with the title, Living on Borrowed Time.

The band employed a tactic common with Hip hop artists, having multiple producers on the album to match the feel of each song. After first working with Stevenson and Jason Livermore, the band decided to change directions on the recording style, with Scantlin stating "We did go to Colorado and worked with Jason and Bill on a full record's worth of material... we decided to go over everything with a fine-toothed comb and make sure it was the record we truly wanted to put out. And we realized, 'Hey, maybe we should hit up some more avenues rather than this punk direction.'"

The band hired Brian Howes, a writer-producer known for working with bands like Buckcherry and Hinder, to assist in writing and production, alongside several other producers including Jack Joseph Puig and Howard Benson. Bassist Douglas Ardito explained the writing process, stating "We had a lot of time to write and then make the record... This time we had time to live life and have experiences to talk about." Scantlin explained "It's about passion and writing music that connects with other people and somehow heals them. really want to try to crawl under peoples' skin and at the same time make some kick-ass rock 'n roll music."

The album's title was changed to match that of its lead single by the label. Scantlin was unhappy with the results of the additional producers brought in, stating in a 2009 interview that the initial version "was fine" and expressing regrets about the final release.

== Track listing ==
No.	Title	Writer(s)	Length
1.	"Famous"	Wesley Scantlin, Brian Howes and Doug Ardito	3:16
2.	"Livin' on Borrowed Time"	Scantlin, Christian Stone	3:01
3.	"It Was Faith"	Howes, Kara DioGuardi	3:31
4.	"Psycho"	Scantlin, Tony Battaglia	3:31
5.	"We Don't Have to Look Back Now"	Max Collins, Tony Fagenson	3:42
6.	"Moonshine"	Scantlin	4:07
7.	"Thinking About You"	Scantlin, Battaglia	3:42
8.	"Merry-Go-Round"	Scantlin, Ardito, Battaglia	2:42
9.	"I'm So Sure"	Scantlin	4:33
10.	"Radiate"	Scantlin, Ardito, Bill Stevenson, Shelly Peiken, Tony Bruno	3:13
11.	"If I Could Love You"	Scantlin, Ardito	3:11
Total length:			38:29

No.	Title	Writer(s)	Length
1.	"Famous"	Wesley Scantlin, Doug Ardito, Brian Howes	3:16
2.	"Livin' on Borrowed Time"	Scantlin, Christian Stone	3:01
3.	"It Was Faith"	Howes, Kara DioGuardi	3:31
4.	"Psycho"	Scantlin, Tony Battaglia	3:31
5.	"We Don't Have to Look Back Now"	Max Collins, Tony Fagenson	3:42
6.	"Moonshine"	Scantlin	4:07
7.	"Thinking About You"	Scantlin, Battaglia	3:42
8.	"Merry-Go-Round"	Scantlin, Ardito, Battaglia	2:42
9.	"I'm So Sure"	Scantlin	4:33
10.	"Radiate"	Scantlin, Ardito, Bill Stevenson, Shelly Peiken, Tony Bruno	3:13
11.	"If I Could Love You"	Scantlin, Ardito	3:11
Total length:			38:29

B-Sides
No.	Title	Length
1.	"Cast Away" (Best Buy exclusive)	3:18
2.	"Reason" (Target exclusive) (Re-released on Volume 4: Songs in the Key of Love & Hate as "The Only Reason")	4:08
3.	"Miracle" (Target exclusive)	4:01

== Personnel ==
Credits adapted from the album's liner notes.

Puddle of Mudd

- Wesley Scantlin – lead vocals, rhythm guitar
- Doug Ardito – bass, vocals
- Christian Stone – lead guitar, vocals
- Ryan Yerdon – drums

Additional personnel

- Tony Fagenson – piano, guitars, keyboards, percussion, programming, backing vocals, engineering, production
- Kenny Aranoff – drums
- Josh Freese – drums
- Xandy Barry – guitars
- Duane Betts – guitars
- Lenny Castro – percussion
- Max Collins – acoustic guitar, production
- Tony Battaglia – guitars, engineer, production
- Andrew Berlin – guitars, engineer
- Brian Howes – guitars, production
- Christopher Jak – guitars, engineer
- Abe Laboriel, Jr. – drums, percussion
- Lee Miles – guitar, engineer
- Tim Pierce – guitars
- Mark Pontius – drums
- Gabe Witcher – backing vocals

Production

- Bryan Coisne – engineer
- Paul DeCarli – digital editing
- Kara DioGuardi – vocal production
- Tal Herzberg – engineer
- Hatsukazu Inagaki – engineer
- Ted Jensen – mastering
- Jolie Jones Levine – production coordinator
- Jason Livermore – engineer, production
- Jon Nicholson – drum tech
- Mike Plotnikoff – engineer
- Johnny Schou – engineer
- Matt Serrecchio – engineer
- Marc VanGool – guitar tech
- Jack Joseph Puig – executive producer, mixing, production, A&R
- Bill Stevenson – engineer, production
- Jason VanPoederooyen – engineer

== Charts ==
=== Weekly charts ===
Weekly chart performance for Famous
Chart (2007)	Peak position
Canadian Albums (Nielsen SoundScan)	38
US Billboard 200	27
US Top Alternative Albums (Billboard)	8
US Top Hard Rock Albums (Billboard)	5
US Top Rock Albums (Billboard)	11

=== Year-end charts ===
Year-end chart performance for Famous
Chart (2008)	Position
US Billboard 200	196
US Top Hard Rock Albums (Billboard)	25
