= Spaceship (Puddle of Mudd song) =

Single by Puddle of Mudd

from the album Volume 4: Songs in the Key of Love & Hate
- Released: October 27, 2009
- Length: 3:22
- Label: Geffen
- Songwriter: Wes Scantlin

Puddle of Mudd singles chronology
"Livin' on Borrowed Time" (2008)	"Spaceship" (2009)	"Shook Up the World" (2010)

Music video
- "Spaceship" on YouTube

"Spaceship" is the first single by the post-grunge band Puddle of Mudd from their album Volume 4: Songs in the Key of Love & Hate. The music video premiered on Yahoo Music on November 16, 2009. As of August 2010, "Spaceship" has shifted 118,000 copies in the United States.

== Music video ==
The video directed by Petro (The Academy Is, Rufus Wanwright) channels the best in space travel with alien strippers and an homage to Star Wars and its scrolling text intro. Rounding out the rockstar antics are the daredevils of Nitro Circus, including Travis Pastrana on his signature dirtbike.

== Charts ==
=== Weekly charts ===
Chart (2010)	Peak position
US Hot Rock & Alternative Songs (Billboard)	16
U.S. Billboard Mainstream Rock Tracks	6
U.S. Billboard Alternative Songs	26
Canada Rock (Billboard)	25

=== Year-end charts ===
Chart (2010)	Position
US Hot Rock Songs (Billboard)	49
US Mainstream Rock (Billboard)	27
US Alternative Songs (Billboard)	81
