= Volume 4: Songs in the Key of Love & Hate =

Studio album by Puddle of Mudd
- Released: December 8, 2009
- Recorded: Early 2009
- Genre: Post-grunge
- Length: 35:50
- Labels: Flawless; Geffen
- Producers: Brian Howes; Brian Virtue; John Kurzweg; Jack Joseph Puig

Puddle of Mudd chronology
Famous (2007)	Volume 4: Songs in the Key of Love & Hate (2009)	re:(disc)overed (2011)

Singles from Volume 4: Songs in the Key of Love & Hate
- 1. "Spaceship" Released: October 27, 2009; 2. "Keep It Together" Released: July 12, 2010

Volume 4: Songs in the Key of Love & Hate

Studio album by Puddle of Mudd
- Released: December 8, 2009
- Recorded: Early 2009
- Genre: Post-grunge
- Length: 35:50
- Labels: Flawless; Geffen
- Producers: Brian Howes; Brian Virtue; John Kurzweg; Jack Joseph Puig

Puddle of Mudd chronology
Famous (2007)	Volume 4: Songs in the Key of Love & Hate (2009)	re:(disc)overed (2011)

Singles from Volume 4: Songs in the Key of Love & Hate
- 1. "Spaceship" Released: October 27, 2009; 2. "Shook Up the World" Released: February 9, 2010; 3. "Stoned" Released: March 8, 2010; 4. "Keep It Together" Released: July 12, 2010

Professional ratings
Review scores
Source	Rating
About.com	2.5/5 stars
Allmusic	2.5/5 stars
BLARE Magazine	3.5/5 stars
Earsucker	7/10 stars
The Diamondback	2/5 stars
TuneLab Music	9/10 stars

Volume 4: Songs in the Key of Love & Hate is the fourth studio album by American rock band Puddle of Mudd. It was released on December 8, 2009, on Flawless Records.

== Background ==
In Spring 2009, the band began recording sessions in Vancouver with Famous producer Brian Howes. Recording in a three part, three week session in Canada initially because of extensive touring duties. Afterwards the band relocated to Hollywood, California for three weeks for additional production with producer and engineer Brian Virtue and Come Clean and Life on Display producer John Kurzweg. Their first time together in six years. Scantlin commented on production work, "Even though we hate messing with success, we felt adding newcomer Brian Virtue to the producer mix would be a welcome change. What we got is 10 tracks of exactly what we were looking for."

The band announced through their MySpace and follow-up interviews in late summer that the album had finished production and was in mixing. Bassist Doug Ardito confirmed only 10 songs to avoid what he called "filler material" and to have new listeners focus more on non-single songs.

Around 21 songs were worked on during production, and whittled down to 10 to 12 tracks according to singer Scantlin. Scantlin described the sound as more edgier, punk rock, similar to earlier releases.

The album was released on December 8, 2009. It debuted at #95 on the Billboard 200. It sold around 100,000 copies in the United States, and the lead single "Spaceship" also sold well over 100,000 copies. Volume 4 was however the band's first album to not produce a Hot 100 hit, and, unlike the previous albums Come Clean, Life on Display and Famous, neither the album sales or any single sales topped 500,000. The album was mixed at Ocean Way Recording.

== Track listing ==
Volume 4: Songs in the Key of Love & Hate
No.	Title	Lyrics	Music	Length
1.	"Stoned"	Brian Howes; Wes Scantlin; Paul Phillips	Howes; Scantlin; Phillips	3:30
2.	"Spaceship"	Scantlin	Scantlin; Phillips; Christian Stone	3:14
3.	"Keep it Together"	Scantlin	Phillips; Scantlin	3:52
4.	"Out of My Way"	Scantlin	Phillips; Scantlin	4:02
5.	"Blood on the Table"	Scantlin	Phillips; Scantlin	3:13
6.	"The Only Reason"	Scantlin	Doug Ardito; Duane Betts	4:07
7.	"Pitchin' a Fit"	Scantlin	Scantlin; Stone	3:39
8.	"Uno Mas"	Scantlin	Ardito	2:59
9.	"Better Place"	Scantlin	Scantlin; Stone; John Kurzweg	4:01
10.	"Hooky"	Scantlin; Phillips	Scantlin; Phillips; Kurzweg	3:10
Total length:				35:50

Deluxe Edition bonus tracks
No.	Title	Length
11.	"Spaceship" (Acoustic)	3:15
12.	"Better Place" (Acoustic)	3:53
13.	"Stoned" (Acoustic)	3:33
14.	"Crowsfeet"	4:08

iTunes exclusive track
No.	Title	Length
15.	"Living in a Dream"	4:27

Puddle of Mudd website exclusive
No.	Title	Length
16.	"Shook Up the World"	4:55

Due to the departure of some members during 2009–2011, more than half of the album's songs were never performed live. The only songs that are constant parts of current live gigs are Stoned and Spaceship. In the early 2010s, Keep It Together and Blood On The Table were performed several times. The rest of the songs have yet to be performed live. In 2024, Puddle of Mudd added Pitchin‘ a Fit to their live setlist and performed it live twice.

== Personnel ==
- Wesley Scantlin – lead vocals, rhythm guitar
- Paul Phillips – lead guitar on all tracks except track 6
- Doug Ardito – bass
- Ryan Yerdon – drums on tracks 4, 5, 7, 8, 9, 10 and 14
- Josh Freese – drums on tracks 1, 2, 3, and 6
- Duane Betts – lead guitar on track 6
- Brian Howes – additional guitar, keys and vocals on tracks 1, 2 and 3
- Misha Rajaratnam – string arrangement on track 3
- Wesley Michener – background vocals on track 5
- John Kurzweg – piano on tracks 12 and 14
- Bill Appelerry – piano on "Shook up the world"
- Stevie Blacke – String engineering and arrangements on "Shook Up the World"

=== Production ===
- Brian Howes – producer on tracks 1, 2 and 3
- Jay "JVP" Van Poederooyen – engineer on tracks 1, 2, and 3
- Brian Virtue – producer/engineer on tracks 4, 5, 7, and 8
- John Kurzweg – producer/engineer on tracks 9, 10, 14
- Bill Stevenson – producer/engineer on track 6
- Jason Livermore – producer/engineer on track 6
- Andrew Berlin – engineer on track 6
- Johnny Schou – engineer on track 6
- Tal Herzberg – engineer on track 6

"Shook Up the World" produced/mixed/engineered by – Bill Appelerry

- Written by – Wesley Scantlin, Paul Phillips and Danny Wimmer
- Album mixed by Jack Joseph Puig
- Album mastered Ted Jensen

== Charts ==
Chart (2009)	Peak position
US Billboard 200	95
US Top Alternative Albums (Billboard)	12
US Top Current Album Sales (Billboard)	78
US Top Hard Rock Albums (Billboard)	7
US Top Rock Albums (Billboard)	20
