= Flawless Records =

- Parent company: Interscope-Geffen-A&M
- Founded: 1999
- Founder: Fred Durst
- Defunct: 2010
- Status: Defunct
- Distributors: Geffen Records (In the US); Polydor Records (Outside of the US)
- Genre: Various
- Country of origin: United States

Flawless Records was a record label formed by Limp Bizkit frontman Fred Durst as a division of Geffen Records. It has signed such bands as Puddle of Mudd, The Revolution Smile, and Ringside.

== Artists ==
- Big Dumb Face
- Kenna
- Puddle of Mudd
- She Wants Revenge
- The Revolution Smile
- Ringside
- Sinisstar

== Flawless Releases ==
- The Family Values Tour 1999 (Various Artists) (5/23/00)
- Big Dumb Face – Duke Lion Fights the Terror!! (3/6/01)
- Puddle of Mudd – Come Clean (8/28/01)
- The Revolution Smile – We Are in This Alone (2002)
- The Revolution Smile – Above the Noise (7/29/03)
- Puddle of Mudd – Life on Display (11/25/03)
- Ringside – Ringside (4/19/05)
- She Wants Revenge - She Wants Revenge (1/31/06)
- She Wants Revenge - This Is Forever (10/9/07)
- Puddle of Mudd – Famous (10/9/07)
- Puddle of Mudd – Volume 4: Songs in the Key of Love & Hate (12/8/09)

== See also ==
- List of record labels
