= Paul Phillips (guitarist) =

American guitarist

Paul James Phillips
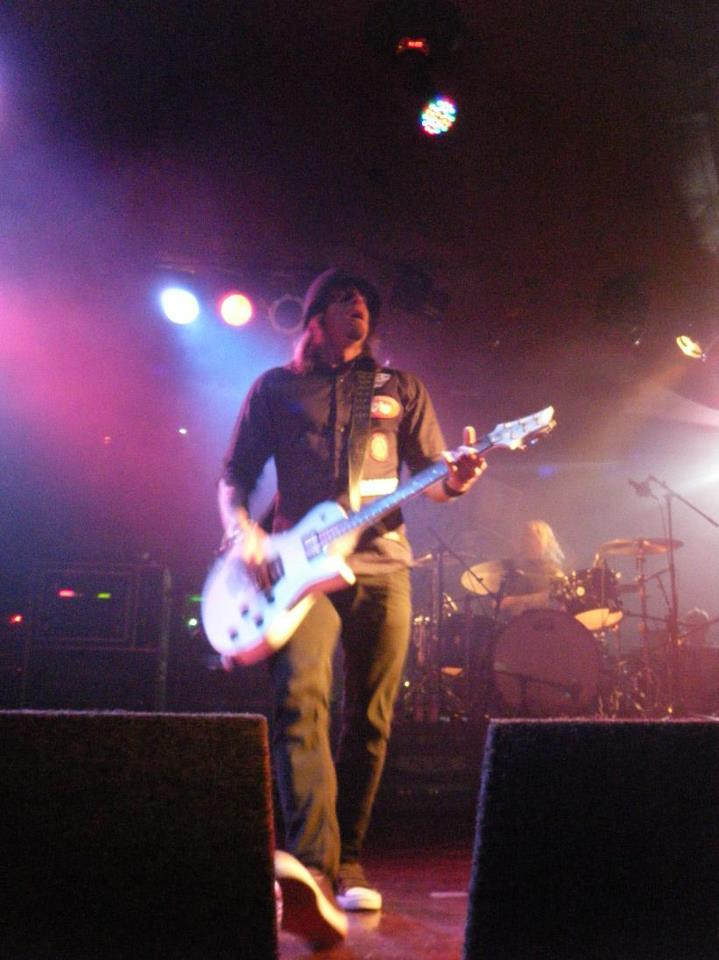
- Phillips performing with Puddle of Mudd in 2011

Background information
- Born: June 26, 1975 (age 51); Brunswick, Georgia, U.S.
- Genres: Hard rock; alternative rock; post-grunge; grunge; alternative metal; ska punk
- Occupation: Musician
- Instrument: Guitar
- Years active: 1990–present

Paul James Phillips (born June 26, 1975) is an American guitarist, most famous for being a member of the rock band Puddle of Mudd from 2001 to 2005 and again from 2009 to 2011. He has also played in the bands Happy Hour, Operator, Society Red and Rev Theory.

== Early life ==
Paul Phillips picked up guitar when he was 11. His father played guitar in a cover band. His first guitar and amp was a Squier Strat and a small Peavey combo amp, "I don't remember what the name or model it was; I remember it was a small combo thing." Phillips said.

== Career ==
Phillips first played guitar in the Jacksonville, Florida ska/punk band Happy Hour.

Phillips joined Puddle of Mudd when his friend Fred Durst invited him to audition for a band for Durst's record label. He started with Puddle of Mudd on their 2001 hit album Come Clean. He also assisted with guitars and vocals in the group's 2003 album, Life on Display. Phillips left the band in 2005, citing creative differences.

In 2007, he joined the band Operator, appearing on their debut album, Soulcrusher.

In 2008, Phillips briefly joined the Jacksonville, Florida band Society Red.

He returned to Puddle of Mudd in 2009 and played guitar in the group's 2009 album, Volume 4: Songs in the Key of Love & Hate and on their 2011 cover album, Re:(disc)overed.

On November 13, 2011, Phillips posted the following on his Facebook page: "So here it is. The bombshell followed by silence. I will not be touring with Puddle on this upcoming run. I won't be airing any dirty laundry in public. That's not who I am. I just want to thank each and every one of you for your support throughout the years at shows and on my facebook page here. It means a lot. I've always tried to make myself accessible to you and have always tried to never let you down when I got up on that stage. However, there is nothing I can do".

Phillips contributed original music and scored several sections of the 2012 film Nitro Circus: The Movie with Puddle of Mudd's former bassist, Damien Starkey.

Phillips acted in the 2013 horror short film The Guy Knows Everything.

He is currently working on a new project called The Fallout Collective, DJing on The Fox 107.7, and had a guest appearance on the TV show Real Fear on Chiller. He is also working on becoming a personal trainer and doing fitness photo shoots.

== Influences ==
Phillips has been influenced by genres such as country rock, blues rock, with groups such as Guns N' Roses, Lynyrd Skynyrd, Led Zeppelin, Deep Purple, and Nirvana.

== Personal life ==
There was a wanted fugitive in 2006 who claimed to be Paul Phillips and was wanted for assault with a deadly weapon. As reported on the September 23, 2006 edition of America's Most Wanted, the culprit, whose name is Martin Minter, was captured, one week after being featured on the program.

== Discography ==
=== Puddle of Mudd ===
- Come Clean (2001)
- Life on Display (2003)
- Volume 4: Songs in the Key of Love & Hate (2009)
- Re:(disc)overed (2011)

=== Operator ===
- Soulcrusher (2007)
