= Life on Display =

Studio album by Puddle of Mudd
- Released: November 25, 2003
- Recorded: 2003
- Genre: Post-grunge
- Length: 55:36
- Labels: Geffen; Flawless
- Producers: John Kurzweg; Michael "Elvis" Baskette; Puddle of Mudd

Puddle of Mudd chronology
Come Clean (2001)	Life on Display (2003)	Famous (2007)

Singles from Life on Display
- 1. "Away from Me" Released: October 21, 2003; 2. "Heel Over Head" Released: February 17, 2004; 3. "Spin You Around" Released: June 15, 2004

Life on Display is the second studio album by post-grunge rock band Puddle of Mudd. It was produced by John Kurzweg whose previous work includes Creed, Socialburn, and No Address, and whom produced the band's previous album, and Michael "Elvis" Baskette. Life on Display was certified gold in the U.S by the RIAA on February 6, 2004. To date, Life on Display has sold 706,191 units in the United States.

The album received generally negative reviews, and peaked at #20 on the Billboard 200 album chart, spending 23 weeks on the chart. It was less successful internationally on the charts.

The album spawned one hit single, "Away from Me", which reached #1 on the Mainstream Rock Tracks. Two additional minor hits, "Spin You Around" and "Heel Over Head," charted on the U.S. Mainstream Rock and Alternative charts. All three singles had corresponding music videos.

== History ==
Puddle of Mudd began writing material for the second album while on tour for their first in 2002. 18 songs were recorded for the record. The band spent over eight months in various studios recording the material. Singer Scantlin had to learn new chord progression for the track, "Time Flies". A B-side song entitled "Bleed" was loaned for the movie The Punisher. An unreleased song called "Galvanic" garnered some attention due to the fact Scantlin cried during playback for it.

== Promotion ==
The "Away from Me" video was featured during the 10th season of Making the Video. Puddle of Mudd also performed four tracks off the album on the November 25 debut episode of Fuse TV's 7th Avenue Drop. "Nothing Left to Lose" served as the main theme song for WWE's Royal Rumble 2004 and also appeared on the soundtrack of the TV series The O.C..

== Critical reception ==
Professional ratings
Aggregate scores
Source	Rating
Metacritic	37/100
Review scores
Source	Rating
AllMusic	2/5 stars
Blender	2/5 stars
E! Online	C
Entertainment Weekly	B−
Melodic	3/5 stars
Now	1/5 stars
Q	2/5 stars
Rolling Stone	1/5 stars
Spin	D

Initial critical response to Life on Display was generally unfavorable. At Metacritic, which assigns a normalized rating out of 100 to reviews from mainstream critics, the album has received an average score of 37, based on seven reviews. Life on Display received largely average to poor reviews from Entertainment Weekly, E Online, and AllMusic. Christian Hoard of Rolling Stone gave the album a mere 1 out of 5 stars, citing "the predominant emotion transmitted by these tired, hookless tunes is a kind of skull-banging numbness."

== Track listing ==
All tracks are written by Wesley Scantlin except where noted.

No.	Title	Writer(s)	Length
1.	"Away from Me"		4:00
2.	"Heel Over Head"		4:05
3.	"Nothing Left to Lose"		4:30
4.	"Change My Mind"	Scantlin, Doug Ardito	4:20
5.	"Spin You Around"		4:27
6.	"Already Gone"		4:32
7.	"Think"		4:10
8.	"Cloud 9"		3:34
9.	"Bottom"		5:22
10.	"Freak of the World"		3:36
11.	"Sydney"		4:58
12.	"Time Flies"		7:05
Total length:			55:36

Bonus tracks
No.	Title	Length
13.	"Life Ain't Fair"	3:45
14.	"Daddy"	4:17
15.	"Bleed"	3:34

== Personnel ==
Puddle of Mudd

- Wesley Scantlin – lead vocals, rhythm guitar
- Paul Phillips – lead guitar, backing vocals
- Doug Ardito – bass, backing vocals, acoustic guitar (4)
- Greg Upchurch – drums, backing vocals

Additional musicians

- Peter Katsis – triangle
- Ian Montone – additional triangle
- Bill McGathy – tambourine

Production

- Puddle of Mudd – producer
- John Kurzweg – producer and engineer (2–4, 6–9, 11–15)
- Michael "Elvis" Baskette – producer and engineer (1–3, 5, 10)
- Andy Wallace – mixing
- Steve Sisco – mixing assistant
- Josh Wilbur – mixing (13), Pro-Tools
- Tony Schloss – additional Pro-Tools
- John O'Mahony – additional Pro-Tools
- Vlado Meller – mastering
- Bobby Selvaggio – Pro-Tools editing and additional engineering (4, 6–9, 11, 12)
- Toshi "T-Fuzz" Kasai – additional engineering and assistant engineer (4, 6–9, 11, 12)
- Jeremy Parker – assistant engineer (4, 6–9, 11, 12)
- Mark Dobson – additional Pro-Tools editing (4, 6–9, 11, 12)
- Dan Certa – additional Pro-Tools editing (4, 6–9, 11, 12)
- Dave Holdredge – digital editing and additional engineering (1, 5, 10)

== Charts ==
=== Weekly charts ===
Weekly chart performance for Life on Display
Chart (2003)	Peak position
Austrian Albums (Ö3 Austria)	55
Canadian Albums (Nielsen SoundScan)	47
German Albums (Offizielle Top 100)	69
Scottish Albums (Official Charts)	95
Swiss Albums (Schweizer Hitparade)	48
UK Albums (Official Charts)	90
UK Rock & Metal Albums (Official Charts)	10
US Billboard 200	20

=== Year-end charts ===
Year-end chart performance for Life on Display
Chart (2004)	Position
US Billboard 200	117

== Certifications ==
Certifications for Life on Display
Region	Certification	Certified units/sales
Canada (Music Canada)	Gold	50,000^{^}
United States (RIAA)	Gold	500,000^{^}
^{^} Shipments figures based on certification alone.
