= Puddle of Mudd =

American rock band

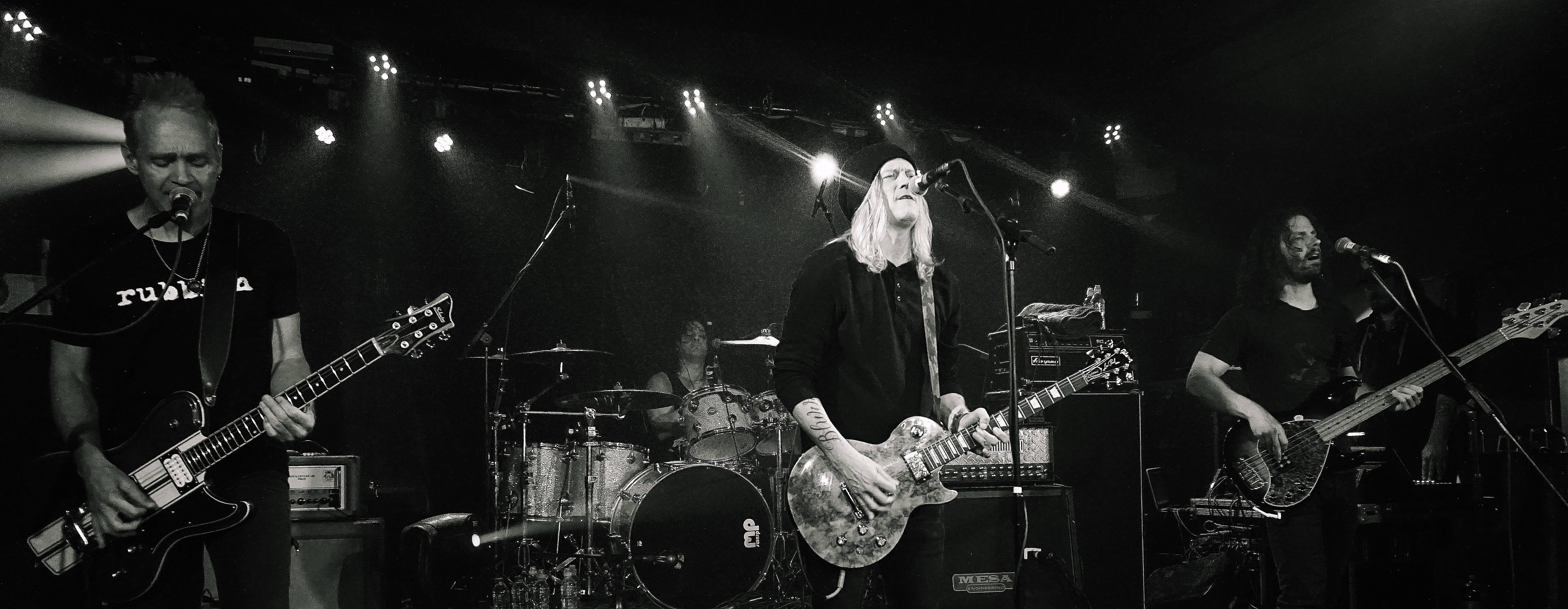
- Puddle of Mudd performing in 2018

Background information
- Origin: Kansas City, Missouri, U.S.
- Genres: Post-grunge; hard rock; alternative rock; alternative metal; nu metal
- Works: Puddle of Mudd discography
- Years active: 1992–present
- Labels: Pavement; Mudd Dog; V&R; Hardknocks; UMG; Flawless; Geffen
- Members: Wes Scantlin; Michael Anthony Grajewski; Miles Schon; Robin Diaz
- Past members: See members section
- Website: puddleofmudd.com

Puddle of Mudd is an American rock band formed in Kansas City, Missouri in 1992. Their second album, Come Clean (2001), spawned the single "Blurry", which peaked at number 5 on the Billboard Hot 100, and remains their signature song. The album sold over five million copies by 2003, and was followed by seven additional albums, the latest of which is Kiss the Machine (2025). Vocalist and guitarist Wes Scantlin has served as the only consistent member throughout the band's history.

== History ==
=== Early years (1992–1999) ===
Puddle of Mudd was formed in 1992 in Kansas City by Wes Scantlin (lead vocals and rhythm guitar), Jimmy Allen (lead guitar), Sean Sammon (bass), and Kenny Burkitt (drums). (Note: The last name of the original drummer, Kenny Burkitt, is misspelled as "Burkett" in various sources. A 2005 legal document regarding use and rights to the name "Puddle of Mudd" has the spelling of his last name with an I not an E. – Burkitt vs. Flawless Records.) According to Scantlin, the band name was inspired by practicing next to the Missouri river levee, which often inundated the band's practice space, but never ruined their equipment since they were on the second floor. In order to get to their practice space, the band "had to walk through a pile of shit."

In August 1994, the band played at the Missouri State Fair. The group's first release, Stuck, a seven-song EP, was released in 1994 on V&R Records. It was produced by the band and E.J. Rose, and was recorded at Red House Studio in Lawrence, Kansas. It spawned two radio singles: "You Don't Know" and "Drift and Die".

Minus Jimmy Allen, the group released an eleven-song indie album, Abrasive, in 1997 on the Madison-based label Hardknocks Records. Three of the songs from Abrasive were later re-recorded for the band's major-label debut Come Clean. Differences of opinion and other factors led to the break-up of the original Puddle of Mudd by early 1999, leaving Scantlin as the only original member.

=== Come Clean (2000–2002) ===
Scantlin's big break in the music business came after a copy of his demo tape was delivered to Fred Durst. Durst contacted Scantlin and decided to bring him to California to put a new band together. At a 2001 Flawless Records showcase, Durst noted that he originally disliked the band's material and told Scantlin to fire everyone else in the band and rebuild it from scratch.

One of the first people Scantlin met upon arriving in California was Doug Ardito, an intern at Interscope Records. When Scantlin found out about Ardito's bass playing, they decided to work together. They were still in need of a guitarist and drummer. Durst decided to contact a guitarist he knew from his hometown of Jacksonville, Florida, Paul Phillips, who had formerly played in a local band there called Happy Hour. After getting the call from Durst, Phillips decided to try out for Puddle of Mudd and was accepted, choosing to leave college in order to join. The band held auditions for a new drummer and initially selected Shane Webb. Due to conflictive schedules, Webb was replaced by Greg Upchurch, who was an ex-member of Eleven and had also toured with Chris Cornell.

Puddle of Mudd entered the studio in 2000 and released its major-label debut album Come Clean on August 28, 2001. The lead single from the album, "Control" was successful. The second single off the album, "Blurry", co-written with Jimmy Allen and Doug Ardito, reached No. 5 on the Billboard Hot 100 and No. 8 in the UK Singles Chart, and winning an ASCAP song of the year award for Ardito, Allen and Scantlin. "Drift & Die" co-written by Jimmy Allen was released as a single spending six weeks at the No. 1 on the Mainstream Rock Chart. The fourth single, "She Hates Me" co-written by Jimmy Allen was released in late 2002, and reached the No. 1 spot on the Mainstream Rock Tracks chart, as well as No. 13 on the Billboard Hot 100. Allen and Scantlin won the ASCAP award for most played rock song of the year.

The group embarked on a European and American tour as the opening act for Godsmack and Deftones, and were a part of the Family Values 2001 tour, alongside Linkin Park, Stone Temple Pilots, and Staind.

The album was certified triple platinum in the U.S. by the Recording Industry Association of America (RIAA) on January 31, 2003, and as of late 2006, total sales worldwide were in excess of five million copies.

=== Life on Display (2003–2005) ===
Puddle of Mudd's follow up, Life on Display, spawned three singles "Away from Me", "Heel Over Head", and "Spin You Around". Marisa Miller appeared in the music video for "Spin You Around". The album was certified gold, and has sold over 706,000 copies, yet was considered a commercial disappointment. Critical reviews were largely negative.

Around this time, Puddle of Mudd lost two longtime members: drummer Greg Upchurch departed to join 3 Doors Down and guitarist Paul Phillips left the band due to creative differences.

=== Famous (2006–2008) ===
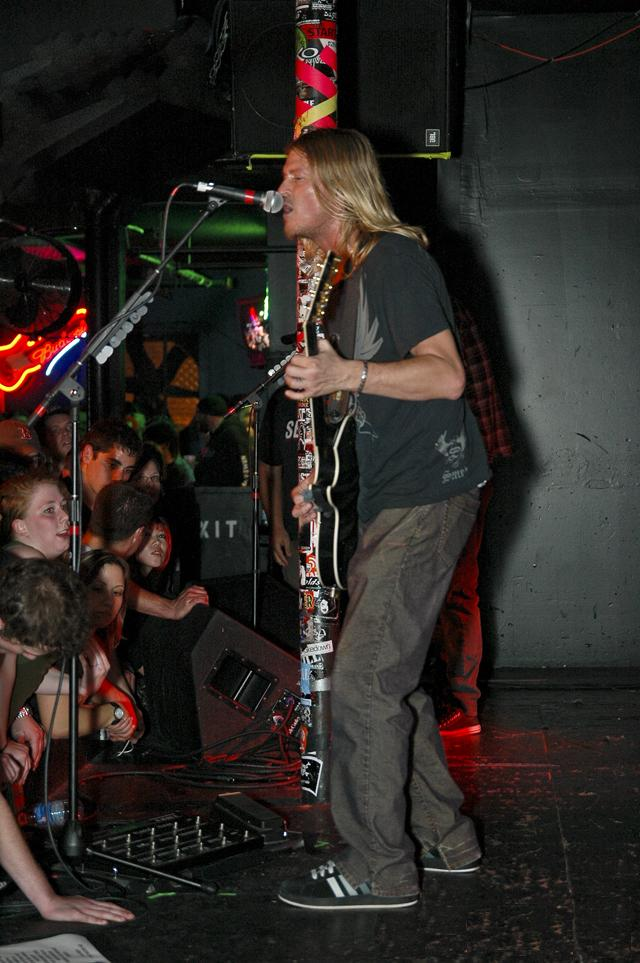
Scantlin performing in 2008

On October 9, 2007, the band released their third major label record, Famous. The first single, "Famous", was released through the band's Myspace page and radio in July before the CD was released. It was a #1 single. Another track, "Merry Go Round", was released through iTunes before the official release. The following single, "Psycho", topped both the Mainstream Rock Tracks and Hot Modern Rock Tracks charts for nine weeks. "Livin' on Borrowed Time" and "We Don't Have To Look Back Now" were the final singles released.

In the spring of 2007, the band went on tour supporting Hinder and Papa Roach on the Door to Dorm tour.

=== Volume 4: Songs in the Key of Love and Hate (2009–2010) ===
In 2009, former guitarist Paul Phillips rejoined the band after replacement Christian Stone was let go on good terms. Around this time the band recruited Famous producer Brian Howes to begin recording a record in Vancouver. Prior to the album's release, band members said the album's name would be called Jacket on the Rack. However, it was changed to Volume 4: Songs in the Key of Love & Hate. Released on December 8, it has sold around 100,000 copies. The first single, "Spaceship", was released in October 2009.

On February 10, 2010, a new song, "Shook Up the World", was released. It was written for Team USA for use in the 2010 Winter Olympics. All proceeds from the song went to Team USA. Although intended for release during the Olympics, the deadline was missed. At the beginning of that same year bassist Doug Ardito left the band and was replaced by Jacksonville Burn Season frontman, Damien Starkey. They played at the Download Festival, and released their first best of collection, titled Icon, featuring the singles from their first four albums.

=== Re:(disc)overed (2011–2019) ===
The band released a cover album titled re:(disc)overed on August 30, 2011. The release featured covers of songs originally by The Rolling Stones, Bad Company, Led Zeppelin, AC/DC and others. According to original bassist Sean Sammon, it was confirmed that the band's first two albums, Stuck and Abrasive, would be re-released sometime in late 2011. Ardito rejoined the band in 2011 and proceeded to tour with them. Ryan Yerdon was replaced by Shannon Boone. The band posted several online updates during 2012 suggesting that they were writing and recording an album. Wes Scantlin was interviewed about his latest arrest for vandalism in July 2013, where he was quoted as saying "We have tons and tons of new hit songs. I write every single night, and we record all the time. We're getting ready to go in and do the record, tour a little bit for the summer, and then do the full production and get back on the scene."

Puddle of Mudd toured during 2014 featuring Wes Scantlin with a different line-up. A non-album single, "Piece of the Action", was released in September 2014.

The band started recording an album with Cameron Webb at Grandmaster Studios in 2015. The following year they took part in the Make America Rock Again super tour with other artists who had success throughout the 2000s including Trapt, Saving Abel, Alien Ant Farm, Crazy Town, 12 Stones, Tantric, Drowning Pool, P.O.D. and Fuel.

=== Welcome to Galvania (2019–2021) ===
In July 2019, a new single, "Uh Oh", was released, with the full album Welcome to Galvania following in September.

In November 2019, the band performed an acoustic session for SiriusXM's Octane channel.

The session went largely unnoticed until April 2020, when an Instagram user posted edited clips of the band's cover of Nirvana's "About a Girl". Greater attention came after reaction videos by Jared Dines and Steve Terreberry. The version of “About a Girl” has been widely criticized, mainly due to Scantlin's strained and off-key vocals.

=== Ubiquitous (2022–present) ===
In 2022, Scantlin stated an album was in the works, and was 'basically pretty much done'. Ubiquitous was released on September 8, 2023. It marked Puddle of Mudd's first album not to include newly recorded material, instead being composed of demos from throughout the band's career, including a re-recorded version of their 1994 track "Poke Out My Eyes" from Stuck, as well as "Dance with Me" and "U Wrekd Me", both songs originally recorded during the sessions for their 2007 release Famous. Other tracks such as "My Baby", "Running Out of Time", "Candy", "Complication" and "California" were recorded with former members Doug Ardito and Christian Stone in 2012 in anticipation of a scrapped sixth album. Later tracks include "Man in the Mirror" and "Butterface", both being written and recorded in 2022, whereas "Cash and Cobain" was recorded in 2020.

Shortly after the album's release, Wes Scantlin cancelled upcoming shows due to the shows being booked without his consent by his management team. Scantlin stated in a later interview that all involved in the bookings were fired and may have included band members. The decision followed reports of internal disputes, including claims that the group had booked shows without his consent and allegations of personal misconduct.

The band's album Kiss the Machine was released in 2025, which was accompanied by the single 'Beautimous'. The album's second single, "Firefly" was released on October 10, 2025, with an official music video. Wes Scantlin dedicated the song and music video to Layne Staley, Chris Cornell and Chester Bennington.

== Musical style and influences ==
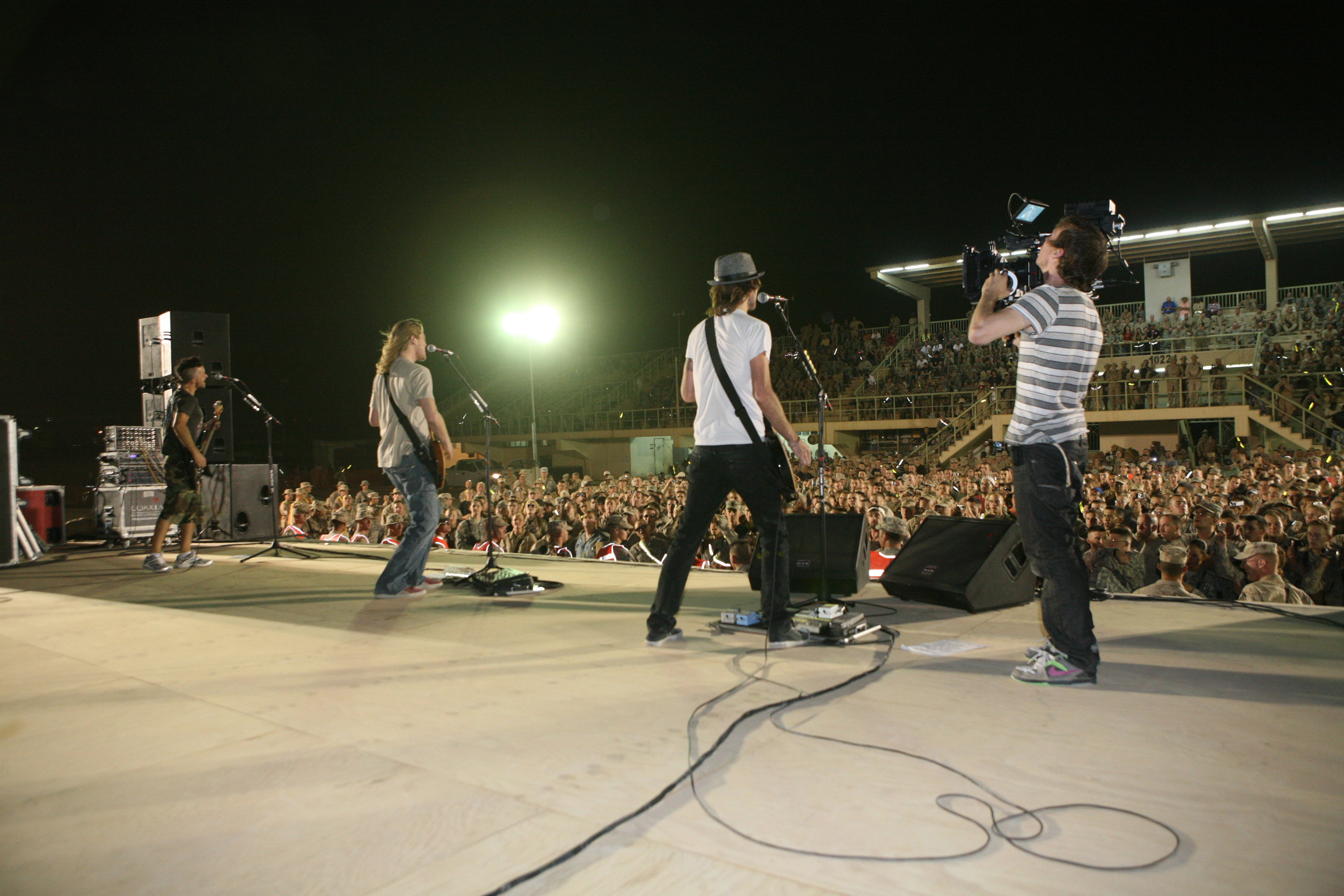
Puddle of Mudd at Al Asad Air Base

Puddle of Mudd is one of the first and most successful post-grunge bands. AllMusic writer James Christopher Monger stated the band are "on the mainstream side of nu metal, and the modern side of grunge." Despite this, their first two releases, Stuck and Abrasive, are closer to traditional grunge, as raw but revealing looks at the band's formative sound prior to its mainstream polish. Partially due to their association with Fred Durst, the band was grouped in with nu metal at their commercial peak in the early 2000s, particularly on Come Clean, but lack many trademarks of the genre, such as rapped vocals and DJ scratching. Critics have also described their musical style as hard rock, alternative rock, alternative metal and grunge.

The biggest influence on Puddle of Mudd's sound is grunge of the early 1990s, specifically the "Flannel Five": Nirvana, Stone Temple Pilots, Alice in Chains, Soundgarden and Pearl Jam. While his favorite band of the five is Soundgarden who "just shred" in his opinion, Wes Scantlin adds, "all of [those bands] are all wonderful artists and just simplified music, in my opinion." He also appreciates and celebrate the life of Eddie Van Halen, but admits he still can not play any of his solos. Scantlin was also influenced by Prince, Janet Jackson, Michael Jackson, Diana Ross, Commodores, Johnny Cash, Iron Maiden, AC/DC, Rage Against the Machine, Snoop Dogg, Ice-T and Nate Dogg growing up, but concludes the "list can basically go on forever."

== Controversies ==
Since 2012, Scantlin has been accused on numerous occasions of lip syncing during live performances.

On April 16, 2014, Scantlin had an on-stage meltdown during a show at Trees Dallas, in which he threw a microphone and beer into the audience, as well as appearing to threaten and attempt to physically attack members of the audience. He also received criticism as he appeared to be lip-syncing during the performance.

On June 20, 2015, the band was booed off stage at a show in Versailles, Ohio, after Scantlin was spotted lip-syncing to the songs. In response to the social media backlash, the band subsequently deleted their Facebook page. With the Facebook page available, the Austin, Texas-based rock band Black Heart Saints gained access as an opportunity to promote their music using the page title "Check This Band Out Instead", although later Puddle of Mudd decided to use the page again.

On August 18, 2017, Thetford Mines' Festival de la Relève had to cancel a performance by the band, who were the festival's headliners, after neither Scantlin nor the rest of the band appeared at Québec City Jean Lesage International Airport, where volunteers were to pick them up to drive them to the festival. No reason was given for the band's absence.

=== Connection with Fred Durst ===
Due to the notoriety surrounding how the band was signed with Fred Durst, the band is often asked regarding their relationship with him. Scantlin criticized Durst in an interview in 2004 with Canada's Chart magazine:

"He doesn't write our songs, he doesn't produce our songs, he doesn't do anything for us. He doesn't do our videos anymore. He doesn't do anything for this band. I don't know what he's doing, I don't know what the guy's like. All I know is that he's like Mr Hollywood guy, Mr Celebrity. Like, 'I don't hang out with anybody except Hollywood celebrities'. Every single fucking interview I've ever fucking done, I get asked about that fucking guy... And for me to do interviews all the time and be asked about this certain individual... People think he writes music with me or something. He does not do that. I just don't get it. We have nothing in common. He doesn't even call us, he has his assistant call us to congratulate us on our record. Yeah, that's how pathetic he is."

On April 22, 2008, in an interview with Artisan News Service, Scantlin took back his previous criticism of Fred Durst:

"[Fred] got our foot in the door and helped us out tremendously. I think nowadays he's doing a lot of directing and we don't really speak to him too much but we appreciate everything he's ever done for our careers."

Limp Bizkit and Puddle of Mudd played together on Epicenter 2011, along with another one of Durst's former proteges, Staind.

Scantlin later stated that he wanted to make a movie regarding his life and music career, and that he wanted to involve Durst, who had directed several films himself.

== Band members ==
Current members

- Wes Scantlin – lead vocals (1992–present), rhythm guitar (1992–2011, 2014–present), lead guitar (1996–1999)
- Michael Anthony Grajewski – bass, backing vocals (2012–2014, 2024–present), rhythm guitar (2012–2014)
- Miles Schon – lead guitar, backing vocals (2025–present)
- Robin Diaz – drums, percussion (2025–present)

Former members

- Sean Sammon – bass (1992–1999)
- Kenny Burkitt – drums (1992–1999)
- Jimmy Allen – lead guitar (1992–1996, 2005–2006)
- Doug Ardito – bass, backing vocals (1999–2010, 2011–2014), rhythm guitar (2012–2014)
- Paul Phillips – lead guitar, backing vocals (1999–2005, 2009–2011)
- Shane "T-Bone" Webb – drums (1999–2001)
- Greg Upchurch – drums, percussion (2001–2005, 2011)
- Dave Moreno – drums, backing vocals (2005–2006, 2014–2023)
- Ryan Yerdon – drums (2006–2011)
- Christian Stone – lead guitar (2006–2009, 2011–2014)
- Damien Starkey – bass, backing vocals (2010–2011)
- Shannon Boone – drums (2011–2014)
- Adam Latiff – rhythm guitar, backing vocals (2011–2012)
- Matt Fuller – lead guitar, backing vocals (2012, 2014–2023), rhythm guitar (2012)
- Michael John Adams – bass, backing vocals (2014–2023)
- Josh Gilbert – lead guitar, backing vocals (2024–2025)
- Marc Slutsky – drums, percussion (2023–2024)
- Jon Smith – drums, percussion (2024–2025)

== Discography ==
- Stuck (1994) (Note: Stuck was released as a mini-album.)
- Come Clean (2001)
- Life on Display (2003)
- Famous (2007)
- Volume 4: Songs in the Key of Love & Hate (2009)
- Re:(disc)overed (2011) (Note: Re:(disc)overed was released as a cover album.)
- Welcome to Galvania (2019)
- Ubiquitous (2023)
- Kiss the Machine (2025)

== Accolades ==
=== Awards and nominations ===
Year	Nominee / Work	Award Associations		Result	Ref(s)
Year	Nominee / Work	Award Ceremony / Media	Category	Result	Ref(s)
2002	"Blurry"	Kerrang! Awards	Best Single	Won	
2002	"Come Clean"	Kerrang! Awards	Best Album	Nominated	
2002	Puddle of Mudd	Kerrang! Awards	Best International Newcomer	Nominated	
2002	"Blurry"	MTV Video Music Awards	Best New Artist in a Video	Nominated	
2002	Puddle of Mudd	MTV Europe Music Awards	Best Hard Rock	Nominated	
2002	"Blurry"	MuchMusic Video Awards	Best International Video	Nominated	
2002	"Blurry"	Teen Choice Awards	Choice - Rock Track	Nominated	
2002	Puddle of Mudd	Billboard Music Awards	Top Duo/Group	Nominated	
2002	Puddle of Mudd	Billboard Music Awards	Top Rock Artist	Won	
2002	"Blurry"	Billboard Music Awards	Top Rock Song	Won	
2002	Puddle of Mudd	Billboard Music Awards	Modern Rock Artist of the Year	Won	
2002	"Blurry"	Billboard Music Awards	Modern Rock Track of the Year	Won	
2003	Puddle of Mudd	American Music Awards (January)	Favorite Pop/Rock New Artist	Nominated	
2003	"Blurry"	ASCAP Pop Music Awards	Song of the Year	Won	(Note: Jimmy Allen also received credit.)
2003	"Come Clean"	Echo Awards	Echo Award for Best International Rock/Alternative Group	Nominated	
2004	"She Hates Me"	ASCAP Pop Music Awards	Song of the Year	Won	(Note: Writers Jimmy Allen and Wes Scantlin, and publishers Stereo Supersonic Music, Jordan Rocks Music, and Warner/Chappell Music, Inc. also received credit.)
2006	"Blurry"	BDS Spin Awards	700,000 Spins	Won	
