= Doug Ardito =

Douglas John Ardito
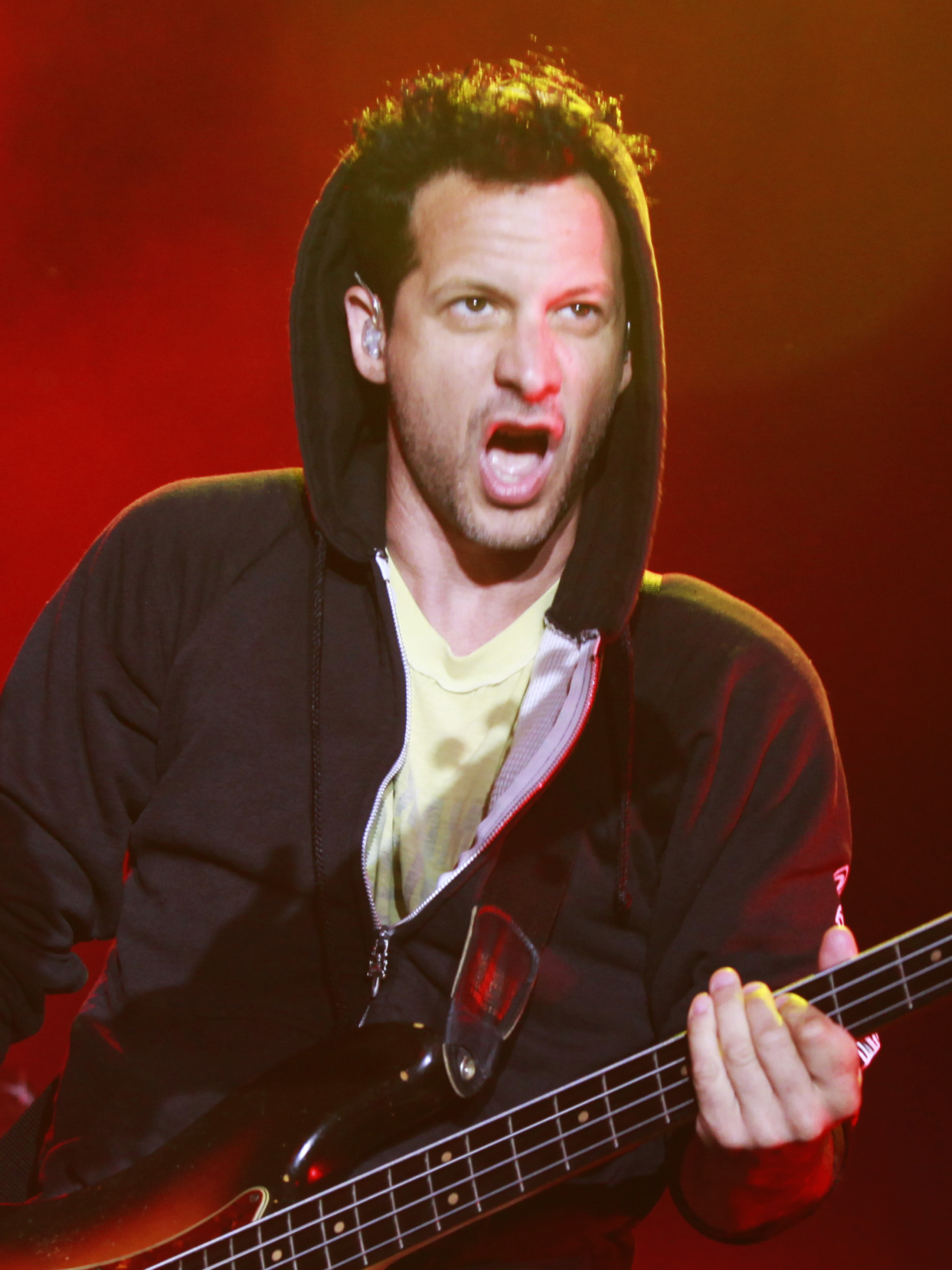
- Ardito performing in 2011

Background information
- Born: March 10, 1971 (age 55)
- Genres: Post-grunge, grunge, alternative rock, alternative metal, nu metal, hard rock
- Occupation: Bass guitarist
- Instruments: Bass, guitar, vocals
- Years active: 1990–present
- Formerly of: Cellophane, Puddle of Mudd, The Wondergirls, Vanilla Ice

Douglas John Ardito (born March 10, 1971) is an American musician who was a member and played guitar as well as bass guitar for the band Puddle of Mudd. He is a Fender Musical Instruments endorsed artist.

== Career ==
Ardito co-wrote Puddle of Mudd's biggest single, "Blurry". Guitar One Magazine voted Ardito's harmonic guitar part in "Blurry" as one of the "Top Ten Riffs of the Decade". The song reached the No. 1 spot on the Hot Mainstream Rock Tracks and Modern Rock Tracks charts for ten and nine weeks. This soon propelled the single to mainstream success, reaching the No. 5 spot on the Billboard Hot 100 Airplay chart. Ardito along with the other two authors of the song won ASCAP's Song of the Year and Pop Song of the Year. "Blurry" also won two Billboard awards in 2002, for "modern rock track of the year" and "rock track of the year". It also won the Kerrang! Award for Best Single. Blurry reached No. 8 in the UK Singles Chart, becoming the band's highest-charting single in the United Kingdom.
