= Wes Scantlin =

American rock musician (born 1972)

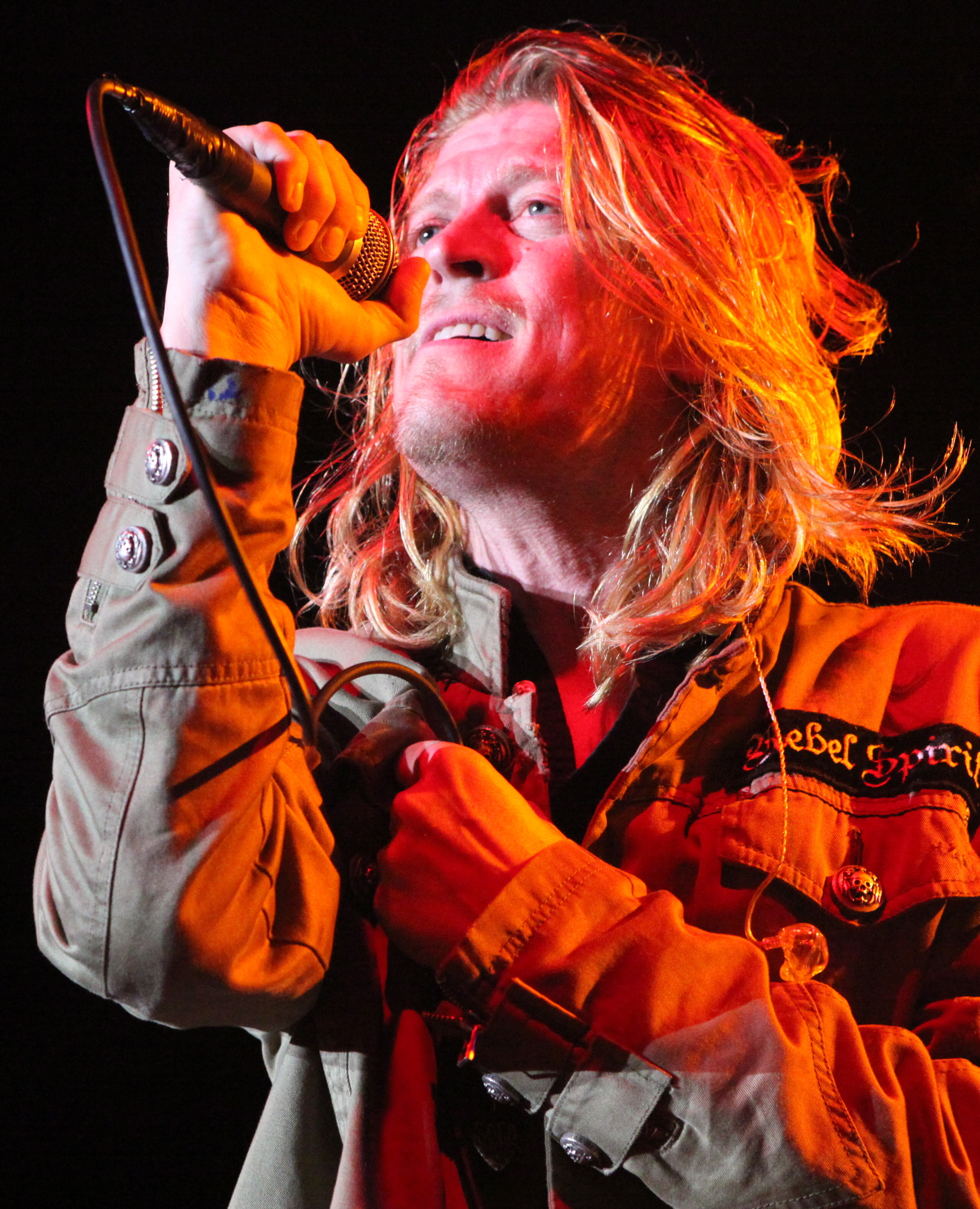
- Scantlin in 2011

Background information
- Born: Wesley Reid Scantlin; June 9, 1972 (age 54); Kansas City, Missouri, U.S.
- Genres: Post-grunge; hard rock; alternative rock; alternative metal; nu metal
- Occupations: Singer; musician; songwriter
- Instruments: Vocals; guitar
- Years active: 1990–present
- Member of: Puddle of Mudd
- Spouse: Jessica Nicole Smith (m. 2008; div. 2012)

Wesley Reid Scantlin (born June 9, 1972) is an American musician who is the lead vocalist, guitarist, and only constant member of rock band Puddle of Mudd.

== Early life ==
Wesley Reid Scantlin was born in Kansas City, Missouri, on June 9, 1972. He attended Park Hill High School in Kansas City.

== Career ==
Scantlin formed Puddle of Mudd in 1991. They released their debut EP Stuck in 1994, followed by a demo album called Abrasive in 1997. Four years later, the band added three new members and released their debut album Come Clean. In 2003, they released their second album, Life on Display. Their third album, Famous, was released in 2007, followed by Songs in the Key of Love & Hate in 2009 and Welcome to Galvania in 2019.

Scantlin sometimes tours with Alice in Chains guitarist Jerry Cantrell, joining Cantrell in playing acoustic renditions of Alice in Chains songs. He was also one of the musicians who participated in Alice in Chains' reunion tsunami benefit show, and was one of many artists who worked with Carlos Santana on his album All That I Am for the song "Just Feel Better". The song was recorded twice with both Scantlin and Steven Tyler, but only Tyler's version appears on the album.

== Personal life ==
Scantlin has a son who was born in 1997. He married Jessica Nicole Smith in January 2008, and they divorced in May 2012.

== Legal issues and controversies ==
In March 2002, Scantlin and his then-fiancée, actress Michelle Rubin, were arrested for allegations of domestic violence after witnesses reported seeing the couple fighting on the side of California's Highway 126 while on their way to a video shoot. Several witnesses reported seeing Scantlin forcing Rubin into a Jeep Cherokee driven by an unknown third person. Scantlin and Rubin were released after posting $20,000 bail each.

During a show in Toledo, Ohio, on February 22, 2004, Scantlin's bandmates walked off the stage in frustration after he admitted to the audience that he was too intoxicated to continue after only four songs.

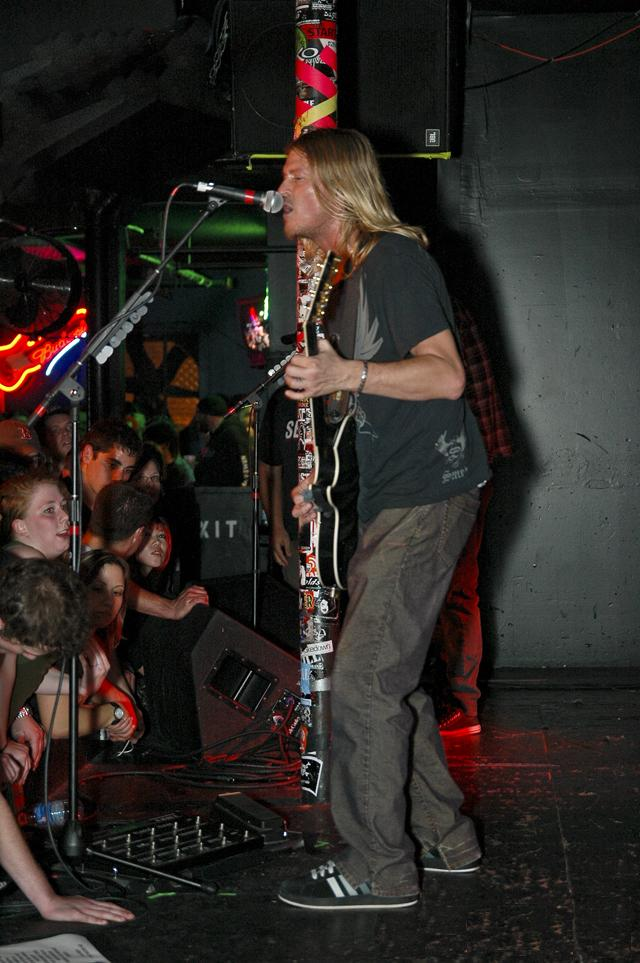
Scantlin in 2008

On September 4, 2012, he was arrested for drunk and disorderly conduct on a cross-country flight from Boston to Los Angeles; the plane had to make an emergency landing in Austin, Texas, where Scantlin was charged with public intoxication.

In May 2013, Scantlin was arrested on domestic violence charges after he allegedly dragged his ex-wife Jessica Nicole Smith and pulled her by the arm or shirt. In July, he was arrested by the Los Angeles Police Department on charges of felony vandalism after he used a buzzsaw and sledgehammer to destroy property on his neighbor's patio.

During a show at Trees Dallas on April 16, 2014, he threw a microphone and beer into the audience, and appeared to threaten and attempt to physically attack members of the audience. He also received criticism as he appeared to be lip-syncing during the performance.

On January 16, 2015, Scantlin was arrested at Denver International Airport after taking a joyride on a baggage carousel and entering a restricted area. During a show on April 2, he smashed his guitar, headphones, and part of the drum kit before walking out. On April 15, he was arrested and charged for disorderly conduct at Milwaukee Mitchell International Airport. On July 26, he was arrested in the early morning after leading sheriff deputies on a high-speed chase in excess of 100 mph (160 km/h) through Renville County, Minnesota. He faced a felony charge of fleeing a police officer in a motor vehicle and two gross misdemeanors of driving under the influence, but the charges were dropped. On August 5, he was arrested for driving under the influence in Sturgis, South Dakota.

On January 10, 2016, Scantlin tried to re-enter the Hollywood house he had lost via foreclosure the previous year, and was arrested for destroying property inside the residence. On April 2, he was arrested at his Los Angeles home. In February, during a concert in Northampton, Pennsylvania, he berated the sound manager and threatened to call the "Kansas City Mafia" on him before ending the show early. On April 30, he was arrested for missing a court date. On August 16, he was caught drinking just before a flight to Louisville, Kentucky. He was removed from the flight and had to cancel a scheduled performance in Louisville. On August 23, his neighbors called police after witnessing him rigging a fake bomb onto his vehicles in an attempt to deter thieves. The mock explosive, consisting of wires attached to the car motor and a gas tank, caused the bomb squad to be called and four surrounding buildings to be evacuated.

On September 9, 2017, Scantlin was arrested at Los Angeles International Airport after he tried to board a plane with a BB gun. His bail was set at $850,000.

During a tour of England in October 2017, Scantlin apologized to the audience in Doncaster for his previous behaviour and admitted to struggling with addiction. He then announced his sobriety and began playing the song "Uh Oh", which he had written to address his problems.

On February 20, 2023, Scantlin was arrested for misdemeanor trespassing after again showing up to his former Hollywood home that he lost years earlier due to foreclosure. According to the home owner, he refused to leave when asked and threatened her maid, prompting the homeowner to call the police. He was initially held on $1,000 bond, but was later released on personal recognizance.

On August 3, 2024, Scantlin was arrested after being pulled over in his black Hummer H2 for a traffic violation in Burbank, California. Officers said they found out he had an active warrant from a previous case for allegedly having a weapon at an airport. They asked him to get out of the car, but he refused; after several attempts, a crisis negotiator came to negotiate, but he still refused. Pepper spray and pepper balls were then deployed. Scantlin was then booked at the jail for the outstanding warrant and the new charge of resisting arrest.

On March 15, 2025, Scantlin was arrested for drug charges and felony domestic violence where he got physical with his girlfriend in Torrance, California.
