= Ron Balicki =

American actor, martial artist, and stuntman (born 1963)

- Born: September 2, 1963 (age 63); Chicago, Illinois, United States
- Occupations: Martial arts instructor; stuntman; film producer; actor
- Spouse: Diana Lee Inosanto (m. 1995)
- Website: ronbalicki.com

Ron Balicki (born September 2, 1963) is an American actor, martial artist and stuntman for various films and television series. He is also a well known martial arts practitioner, teacher, and author. He is a student of and son-in-law to Dan Inosanto.

== Biography ==
Balicki grew up in Chicago, Illinois. In 1987, he became a deputy sheriff for Cook County, Illinois. He helped form a "special operations resistance team" that trained officers in riot control. Around this time, he served as bodyguard for Hollywood movie and music stars including Steven Seagal, Public Enemy, Kid 'n Play, Queen Latifah, and DJ Jazzy Jeff and Will Smith. On December 6, 1995, he married Diana Lee Inosanto, daughter of Dan Inosanto. They have two sons.

=== Martial arts ===
Balicki began training in the martial arts in the late 1960s, and in 1982, began studying with Dan Inosanto. Balicki earned his full instructor certification under Inosanto in the arts of Maphilindo Silat, Filipino Kali, and Jun Fan Gung Fu (Jeet Kune Do concepts). In addition, Balicki also trained CRCA Wing Chun with Sifu Randy Williams.

Balicki served as stunt coordinator and fight choreographer on many film projects (see "filmography" section below). He and his wife choreographed martial arts for the stage production, Be Like Water, produced at East West Players in 2008, which features the ghost of Bruce Lee visiting a troubled teenage Asian American tomboy, offering her lessons and guidance.

== Mixed martial arts record ==
Professional record breakdown
2 matches	1 win	1 loss
By knockout	0	0
By submission	0	1
By decision	1	0

Res.	Record	Opponent	Method	Event	Date	Round	Time	Location	Notes
Win	1–1	Tomoaki Hayama	Decision (unanimous)	Shooto - Reconquista 1	January 18, 1997	3	3:00	Tokyo, Japan	
Loss	0–1	Rumina Sato	Technical Submission (armbar)	Shooto - Complete Vale Tudo Access	July 29, 1995	1	2:14	Omiya, Saitama, Japan	

== Filmography ==
=== Film and television work ===
- "Survive the Night"* (2026) 2nd Unit Director / Fight Coordinator / Role: (Frankie Black) / (Stunt Double: Michael Rooker) / Lux Angeles Studios / Keoni Waxman
- "Big Tiger"* (2025) 2nd Unit Director / Fight Coordinator / Role: (Max) / Lux Angeles Studios / Keoni Waxman
- "The Workout"* (2023) / Stunts
- "The Paper Bag Plan"* (2024) 2nd Unit Director / Stunt Coordinator / Stunt Double: Lance Kinsey / Director: Anthony Lacerno
- "The Island"* (2022) 2nd Unit Director / Fight Coordinator / Stunt Coordinator / (Stunt Double: Jackson Rathbone) / MSR Media / Shaun Piccinino
- "Lights Out"* (2022) Stuntman / Firebrand / Christian Sesma
- "The Book of Boba Fett"* (2022) Stunts / Lucasfilm / Robert Rodriguez
- "Insight"* (2021) Fight Coordinator / Stunts / Stellar Films / Livi Zheng
- "General Commander"* (2017) 2nd Unit Director / Fight Coordinator / Stunt Coordinator / Saradanm Media / Philippe Martinez
- "Contract to Kill"* (2016) 2nd Unit Director / Fight Coordinator / Action House Pictures / Keoni Waxman
- "The Last Ship"* (2016) Role: Alizan / Channel Road Productions
- "Absolution"* (2014) Stunts / Steamroller Prod / Keoni Waxman
- The Drakken* (2014) Fight Coordinator / Stunt Coordinator / Character - Merauder #1 / Matt Wilson
- A Good Man* (2013) 2nd Unit Director / Fight Coordinator / Role: (Polanski) / Steamroller Prod / Keoni Waxman
- Daylight's End* (2013) Fight/Stunt Coordinator / Stunts Double Lance Henriksen / Throttle Films / William Kafuman
- The Beautiful Ones* (2013) CO-fight Coordinator / Stunts Double Ross McCall / First look Prod / Jesse V. johnson
- Force of Execution* (2013) Stunts / Role: Ernest (One Shovel) / Stunts / Steamroller Prod / Keoni Waxman
- The Exchange* (2013) Stunts / (role: Money)
- "Sony HMZ-T2" (2012) (Stunt Coordinator)
- "The Last Tour" (2012) (Stunt Coordinator) (Co Producer) / Role: (Uncle Bob)
- "I, Frankenstein" (2012) (Martial Arts Trainer - Aaron Eckhart / Socratis Otto)
- "Level 7" (2011) (Stunt Coordinator)
- "Punk'd" (2011) (Stunt) / Role: (Los Angeles Police Officer)
- "The Hit List" (Stunts)
- "Should've Been Romeo" (2010) (Stunt Coordinator)
- "Big Time Rush" (2010) (Stunts)
- "Game of Death" (Stunt) / Role: (Jimmy)
- "War of the Ages" (2010) (Stunt Coordinator / Fight Coordinator)
- "Sinners and Saints" (Producer) (Stunt Coordinator) / Role: (Rucker)
- "Tainted Hearts" (2009) (Stunt Coordinator)
- "Highway Hunters" (2009) (Stunt Coordinator)
- "The Dark Path Chronicles" (2009) (Stunt Coordinator)
- "The Cursed" (2010) (Stunt Coordinator) / (Stunt Double: Louis Mandylor) / (Co Producer)
- "The Sensei" (2009) (Stunt Coordinator) (Executive Producer) / Role: (Frank)
- "The Prodigy" (2008) (Stunt Coordinator) Fight Choreographer) / Role: (Frank) / Stunt Double: (Rains) / (Associate Producer)
- "Just Legal" (2005) TV Series (Stunts)
- "Julias Home" (2005) (Stunt Coordinator)
- "Star Trek: Enterprise" (2003) (2004) (2005) TV Series (Stunts)
- "Ned's Declassified School Survival Guide" (2004) TV Series (Stunts)
- "Fist of Cheese" (2004) TV Series (Stunt Coordinator) / (Associate Producer) / Role: (Hoodie)
- "Resident Evil: Apocalypse" (2004) (Fight Coordinator) / trainer: Milla Jovovich
- "The Best Damn Sports Show Period" (Stunts) (2004)
- "Drake & Josh" (2004) TV Series (Stunt Rigger)
- "Redemption" (2002) (V) (Stunts)
- "A Ribbon of Dreams" (2002) (Associate Producer)
- "Alias" (2001) TV Series (Stunts) Multiple Episodes
- "Point Doom" (2001) (Stunts)
- "Modern Warriors" (2000) Himself
- "Life Streams" (2000) (Stunt Coordinator) (Fight Choreography)
- "No Tomorrow" (1999) (Stunts)
- "The Roseanne Show" (1998) TV Series (Stunts)
- "3 Ninjas: High Noon at Mega Mountain" (1998) (Stunts) / Role: (Big Dawg)
- "The Cutoff" (1998) (assistant stunt coordinator) (Stunt Double) Winner: Action Film Festival
- "Buffy the Vampire Slayer" (1997) TV Series (Stunts)
- "Spy Game" (1997) TV Series (Stunts)
- "Money Talks" (1997) / (French Terrorist)
- "Spawn" (1997) Cop
- "JAG" (1996) Soldier
- "The Rock" (1996) Soldier
- "The Glimmer Man" (1996) (Stunts)
- "Barb Wire" (1996) (Fight Trainer: Temuera Morrison) / (Stunts)
- "Second Skin" (1996) (Stunt Coordinator)
- MTV New Edition Music Video "Hit Me Off" (Stunt Coordinator) (1996)
- "Dear God" (1996) Cop
- "Sword of Honor" (1996) (V) (Stunts)
- "The Burning Zone" (1995) Soldier
- "Mars Attacks" (1995) Military Captain
- "Surface to Air" (1995) POW
- "Mighty Morphin Power Rangers" (1993) TV Series (Martial Arts) (Stunts) / Role: Pumpkin Rapper)
- "Biography "The Life of Bruce Lee" (1993) (Martial Artist)
- "Fate of the Dragon" (Stunt Coordinator) (1993)
- "Defender" (Stunts) (1993)

=== Actor ===
- A Good Man (2013)
- The Last Tour (2013)
- Force of Execution (2013)
- Sinners & Saints (2009)
- The Sensei (2008)
- The Prodigy (2004)
- 3 Ninjas: High Noon at Mega Mountain (1998)
- Barb Wire (1996)
