= William Kaufman =

William Kaufman may refer to:

- William S. Kaufman (1849–1916), American architect
- William E. Kaufman, Massachusetts rabbi, retired
- William Kaufman (director), American director of One in the Chamber (2012) and The Marine 4: Moving Target (2015)

== See also ==
- William Kaufmann (1918–2008), American nuclear strategist
