= Diana Lee Inosanto =

American actress, director, and martial artist

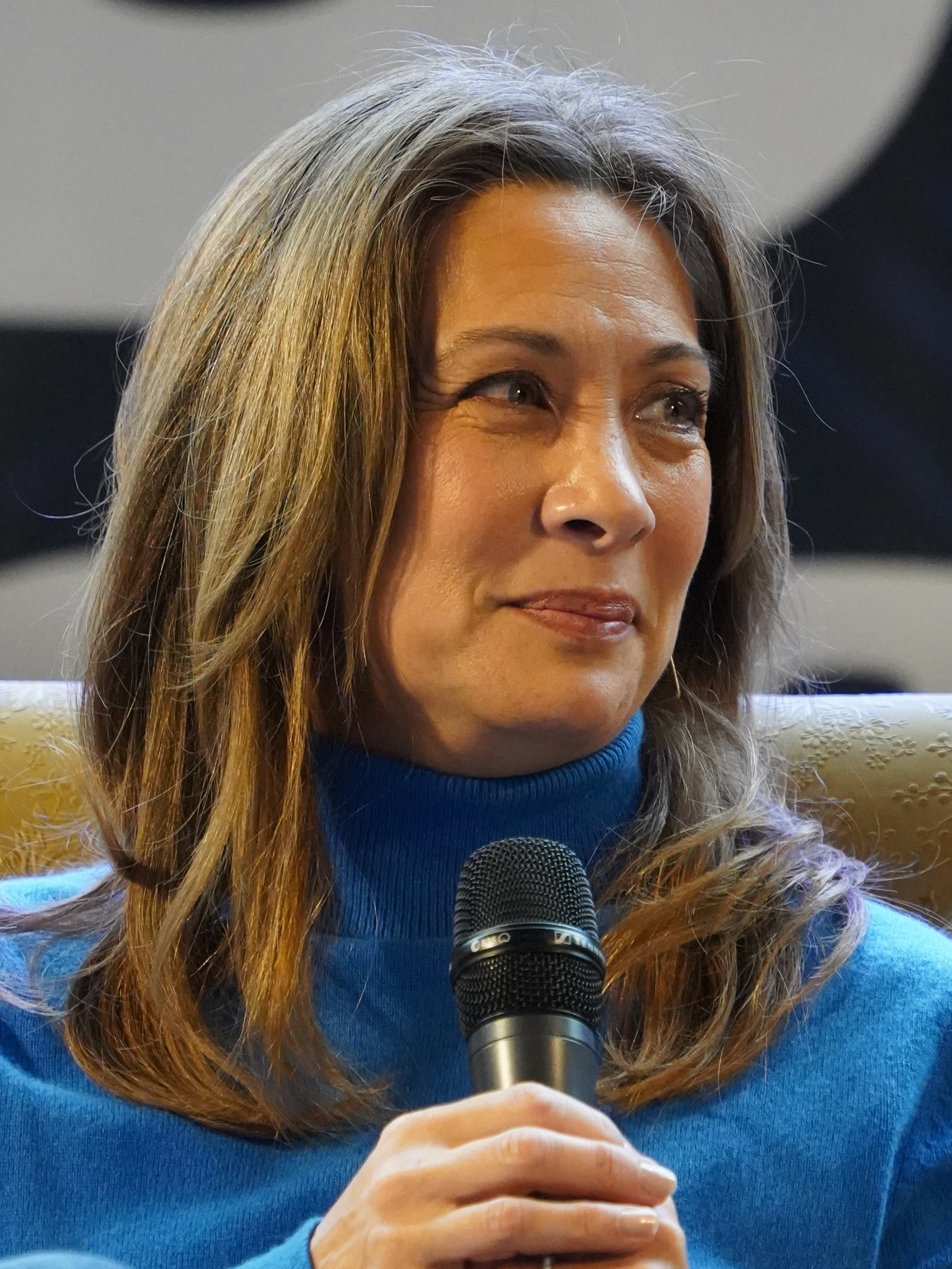
- Inosanto in 2023
- Other names: D. Lee Inosanto
- Occupations: Actress; martial arts choreographer; film director; children's author
- Years active: 1986–present
- Spouse: Ron Balicki (m. 1995)
- Children: 2
- Father: Dan Inosanto
- Website: dianaleeinosanto.com

Diana Lee Inosanto is an American actress, director, former stunt performer, and martial artist. She also wrote and directed the film The Sensei (2008), and wrote the 2020 children's book The Curious Mind of Sebastian.

== Career ==
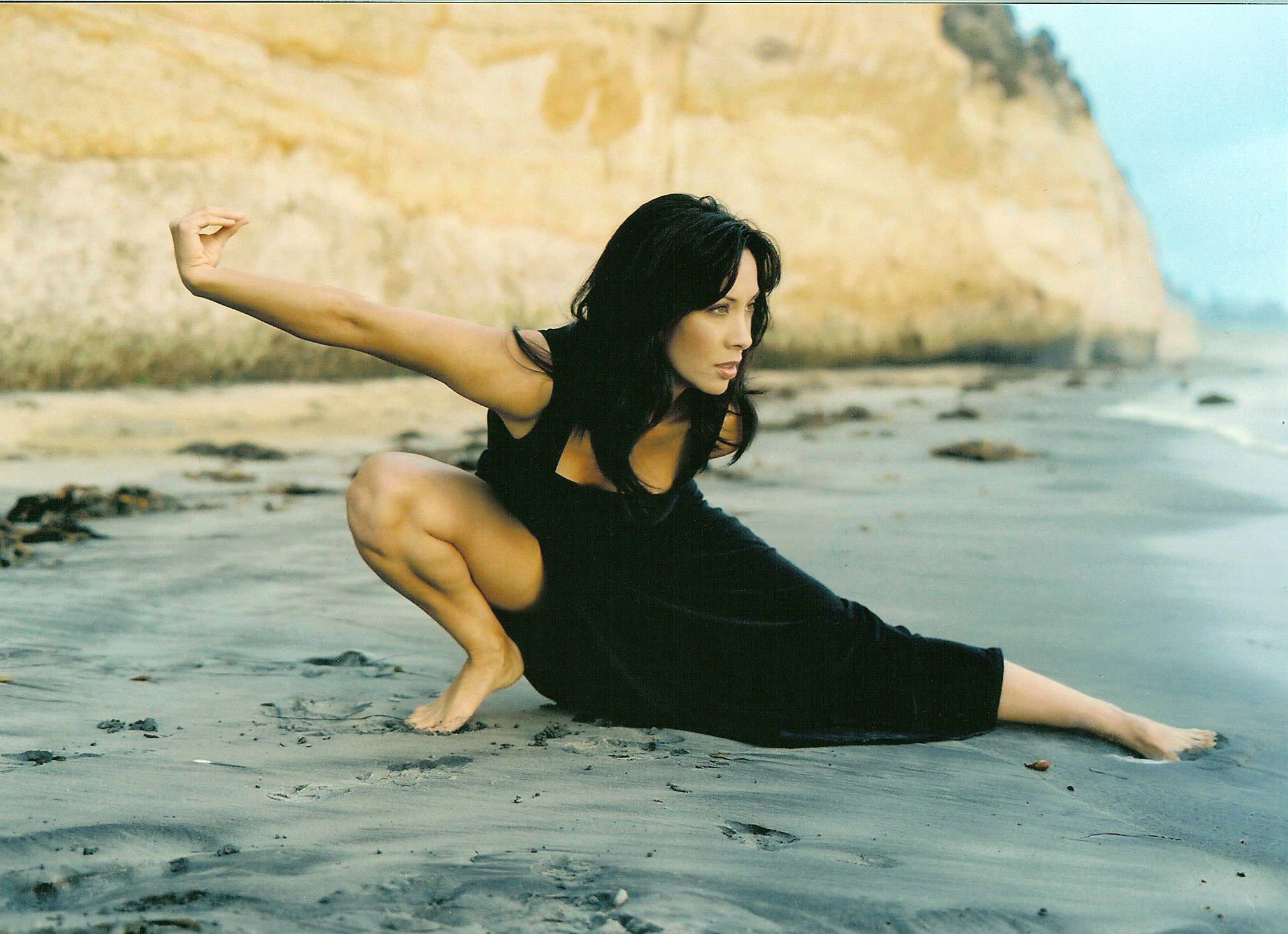
Beach photoshoot, 2004

=== Martial arts ===
Inosanto grew up surrounded by the martial arts world, studying many forms, including Jeet Kune Do and Eskrima, which she learned from her father, Dan Inosanto, a student of Jeet Kune Do founder Bruce Lee, who was also her godfather. She has appeared on the cover of numerous martial arts magazines, including Black Belt Magazine, Martial Arts, Inside Karate, Self Defense, and Inside Kung Fu. She was named Woman of the Year by Black Belt Magazine in 2009.

=== Film and television ===
Apart from doing stunt work and choreography in numerous films and television productions, Inosanto has also acted in a number of movies and series. Her directorial debut, The Sensei, was released in 2008.

In 2020, Inosanto appeared in one episode of the second season of Disney's The Mandalorian, playing the role of Magistrate Morgan Elsbeth. She later reprised the role in Ahsoka and Star Wars: Tales of the Empire.

=== Theatre ===
Inosanto is active in Southern California theatre as a member of the Asian American theatre group Lodestone Theatre Ensemble. In 2008, she worked with East West Players, serving as martial arts choreographer on the world premiere of Dan Kwong's play Be Like Water.

=== Writing ===
In 2020, Inosanto published her first book, the children's story The Curious Mind of Sebastian. The same year, she also contributed a foreword to the Fiaz Rafiq book Bruce Lee: The Life of a Legend.

== Personal life ==
Inosanto is married to fellow martial artist Ron Balicki. They have two children.

== Selected filmography ==
- Moonlighting (1986–87) (actress – 7 episodes)
- Barb Wire (1996) (stunts)
- Buffy the Vampire Slayer (1997–2002) (stunts – 7 episodes)
- Spy Game (1997) (stunts)
- Face/Off (1997) (stunts)
- Team Knight Rider (1997) (stunts)
- Red Corner (1997) (stunts)
- The Roseanne Show (1997) (stunts)
- Walker, Texas Ranger (1997–98) (stunts – 4 episodes)
- Blade (1998) (stunts, actress)
- The Patriot (1998) (stunts)
- The Last Man on Planet Earth (1999) (stunts)
- Wild Wild West (1999) (stunts)
- Mystery Men (1999) (stunts)
- MADtv (1999) (actress – 1 episode)
- Life Streams (2000) (actress, co-producer)
- Black Scorpion (2001) (stunts)
- Fists of Cheese (2002) (assistant stunt coordinator, associate producer)
- The Time Machine (2002) (actress)
- On Sundays (2002) (co-producer)
- A Ribbon of Dreams (2002) (associate producer)
- Modern Warriors (2002) (herself)
- Star Trek: Enterprise (2002–05) (stunts)
- Hulk (2003) (actress)
- 10-8: Officers on Duty (2003) (stunts)
- Resident Evil: Apocalypse (2004) (fight choreographer)
- The Vault (2005) (actress)
- Rent (2005) (actress)
- The Prodigy (2006) (actress, associate producer)
- The Fast and the Furious: Tokyo Drift (2006) (actress)
- The Sensei (2008) (writer, director, producer, actress)
- Sinners and Saints (2010) (co-producer, assistant stunt coordinator)
- I, Frankenstein (2014) (martial arts trainer to Aaron Eckhart / Socratis Otto)
- Spy (2015) (Martial arts trainer to Melissa McCarthy)
- The Mandalorian (2020) (actress – 1 episode)
- Ahsoka (2023) (actress – 7 episodes)
- The Tiger's Apprentice (2024) (actress)
- Star Wars: Tales of the Empire (2024) (actress – 3 episodes)
