= Mandylor =

Mandylor is a surname. Notable persons with that name include:

- Costas Mandylor (born 1965), Australian actor
- Louis Mandylor (born 1966), Australian actor
