= Lamonica =

Lamonica is a given name and surname. Notable people with the name include:

- LaMonica Garrett (born 1975), American actor and Slamball player
- Daryle Lamonica (1941–2022), American football player
- LaMonica McIver (born 1986), American politician
