= Operator (band) =

American post-grunge band

- Origin: Los Angeles, California, United States
- Genres: Post-grunge; alternative metal; hard rock
- Years active: 2003–present
- Label: Atlantic
- Members: Johnny Strong; Ricki Lixx; Paul Phillips; Wade Carpenter; Dorman Pantfoeder

Operator is an American post-grunge band from Los Angeles, California, United States. The name Operator was used for a solo project created by Johnny Strong, an actor and musician, who has appeared in movies such as Black Hawk Down (2001), The Fast and the Furious (2001), Get Carter (2000) and The Glimmer Man (1996).

== History ==
The first Operator album, Can You Hear Me Now (2003), was a self-released demo, and is very hard to find as well as sold out on the band's website. But soon, it attracted the attention of Atlantic Records, which signed Operator in 2007.

Strong soon began recording Operator's Atlantic debut as a solo album playing the lead/rhythm guitar, bass, piano, backing and lead vocals. He eventually put together a band to play live; rhythm consisting of guitarist Paul Phillips, lead guitarist Rikki Lixx, bassist Wade Carpenter, and drummer Dorman Pantfoeder completed the lineup. Thus aggregated, Operator's Atlantic debut, Soulcrusher, was released in the summer of 2007. The album has since sold over 110,000 copies and peaked No. 14 on the heatseekers chart and has produced three singles: "Soulcrusher", "Nothing to Lose" and "Delicate".

According to Harddrive, Operator is on hiatus while vocalist Johnny Strong works on the action film Sinners and Saints (2010). On February 16, 2012, Strong posted a video to his YouTube account explaining what happened with the band, stating "...that he never disbanded Operator, he was the one making the records the entire time", continuing later, "Will there be more 'Operator' records? The answer is yes. Every time I get in that studio, I'm making 'Operator' music". Johnny also indicated in a reply to a comment on the video "...I will be releasing my next record later this year".

== Discography ==
=== Studio albums ===
- Can You Hear Me Now (2003)
- La Luna Del Diablo Blanco (2005)
- Soulcrusher (2007)
- The War of Art (2010)
- Close to Extinction (2012)
- War Horse (2015)
- Volume 7: White Light (2018)

=== Singles ===
Year	Title	Chart peak positions		Album
Year	Title	U.S. Modern rock	U.S. Mainstream rock	Album
2007	"Soulcrusher"	29	8	Soulcrusher
2008	"Nothing to Lose"	—	23	Soulcrusher
2008	"Delicate"	—	—	Soulcrusher
2018	"White Light"	—	—	Volume 7: White Light

== Song appearances ==
- "Soulcrusher", featured on the soundtrack of Madden NFL 08 and MX vs. ATV: Untamed. It was featured as TNA Wrestling 2008 PPV event No Surrender's official theme song.
- "Nothing to Lose", featured on the soundtrack of Burnout Paradise. The song was confirmed as TNA Wrestling 2008 PPV event Lockdown's official theme song.
- "The Only One", which is the theme song for the first season of the television series UFO Hunters.

== Band members ==
- Johnny Strong (2003–present)
- Paul Phillips – rhythm guitar, backing vocals (2003–present)
- Ricki Lixx – lead guitar, backing vocals (2003–present)
- Wade Carrpenter – bass guitar, backing vocals (2003–present)
- Dorman Pantfoeder – drums, percussion (2003–present)
