= One in the Chamber =

2012 American action film

- Promotional release poster
- Directed by: William Kaufman
- Written by: Derek Kolstad; Benjamin Shahrabani
- Produced by: Justin Bursch; Brad Krevoy; Patrick Newall
- Starring: Cuba Gooding Jr. Dolph Lundgren
- Cinematography: Mark Rutledge
- Edited by: Russell White; Jason Yanuzzi
- Music by: John Roome
- Production companies: Mediapro Studios; Motion Picture Corporation of America
- Distributed by: Anchor Bay Entertainment
- Release date: August 21, 2012
- Running time: 91 minutes
- Country: United States
- Language: English
- Budget: $6 million

One in the Chamber is a 2012 American action film directed by William Kaufman, and starring Cuba Gooding Jr., and Dolph Lundgren. Gooding and Kaufman had previously worked together on the 2011 film The Hit List. The film was released on direct-to-DVD in the United States on August 21, 2012.

== Plot ==
After the fall of Communism, criminals from the former USSR flooded into Eastern Europe where they established a crime syndicate in a land where authorities were powerless and the laws were replaced by the crime. Dealers of weapons and drugs have turned Prague into their headquarters where they could make millions of dollars by selling weapons to various gangs.

Ray Carver is an assassin who works for two rival mafia families. After Carver fails to assassinate Demyan Ivanov, one of the crime bosses he frequently works for, he decides to kill the brother of the other crime boss, Mikhail Suverov. Mikhail is angry and wants to kill Ray Carver to avenge his brother's death, so he calls Aleksey "The Wolf" Andreev, a legendary Russian hitman who is rumoured to be fictional. Aleksey is out for Carver, but soon they both realize that they are in the middle of a huge gang war. So they decide to team up and kill every member of the mafia in the Prague's criminal underworld.

== Cast ==
- Cuba Gooding Jr. as Ray Carver
- Dolph Lundgren as Aleksey "The Wolf" Andreev
- Claudia Bassols as Janice Knowles
- Andrew Bicknell as Mikhail Suverov
- Catalin Babliuc as Liev
- Louis Mandylor as Demyan Ivanov
- Leo Gregory as Bobby Suverov
- Lia Sinchevici as Mila
- George Remes as Gregori
- Alin Panc as Vlad Tavanian
- Billy Murray as Leo Crosby
- Florin Roata as Junior
- Alexandra Murarus as Nadia
- Aaron McPherson as Peter
- Andrei Ciopec as Waiter
- Bogdan Uritescu as Nikolai Dvorak
- Jimmy Townsend as Ivan
- David Menina as Matous
- Bogdan Farkas as Goon #1
- Justin Bursch as Crony #1
- Patricia Poienaru as Juliana
- Slavi Slavov as Goon #2
- Annalee Gooding as Bus Passenger
- Zane Jarcu as Crony #2

== Production ==
=== Filming ===
It was filmed in Romania in 25 days from July 7 and August 1, 2011.

=== Casting ===
Billy Murray was confirmed to join the cast on July 4, 2011.

== Release ==
=== Marketing ===
The trailer for the film was released on June 27, 2012. The first clip from the film was released on July 23, 2012.

=== Home media ===
The DVD was released by Anchor Bay Entertainment in Region 1 on August 21, 2012, and Region 2 on August 27.

== Reception ==
=== Critical response ===
The film received mildly positive reviews. Movie Ramblings said "One In The Chamber is a perfectly serviceable thriller – just don't expect too much." Very Aware said "It's certainly not the worst thing you'll ever put in your Blu-ray player, but put it in your Blu-ray player you should." The Other View said "At best, give it a rental before you buy, but I think it's worth it."
