= Nothing to Lose (Operator song) =

Single by Operator

from the album Soulcrusher
- Released: 2008
- Recorded: 2007
- Genre: Hard rock; alternative metal
- Length: 3:52
- Label: Atlantic
- Songwriters: Johnny Strong; Wade Carpenter; Doug Dunnam; Paul Phillips
- Producer: Bill Appleberry

Operator singles chronology
"Soulcrusher" (2007)	"Nothing to Lose" (2008)	"Delicate" (2008)

"Nothing to Lose" is the second single from album Soulcrusher by the hard rock band Operator. Also the song is the second track on the album. The band made a video for this song included tour performance and tour backstages and showing the band in their other playgrounds. The band filmed a second music video that featured the band performing in a warehouse with red lights and with various images appearing on screens behind them. This version received moderate airtime on MTV2.

== Appearances ==
The song featured on the soundtrack of Burnout Paradise and the song was TNA Wrestling 2008 PPV event Lockdown's official theme song.

== Chart position ==
The song peaked at No. 23 on the Billboard Mainstream Rock chart.
