= I, Frankenstein =

2013 film by Stuart Beattie

- Theatrical release poster
- Directed by: Stuart Beattie
- Screenplay by: Stuart Beattie
- Story by: Kevin Grevioux; Stuart Beattie
- Based on: I, Frankenstein by Kevin Grevioux
- Produced by: Tom Rosenberg; Gary Lucchesi; Richard Wright; Andrew Mason; Sidney Kimmel
- Starring: Aaron Eckhart; Bill Nighy; Yvonne Strahovski; Miranda Otto; Socratis Otto; Jai Courtney; Kevin Grevioux
- Cinematography: Ross Emery
- Edited by: Marcus D'Arcy
- Music by: Johnny Klimek; Reinhold Heil
- Production companies: Lakeshore Entertainment; SKE Films; Hopscotch Features
- Distributed by: Lionsgate
- Release date: January 24, 2014 (United States)
- Running time: 92 minutes
- Country: United States
- Language: English
- Budget: $65 million
- Box office: $76.8 million

I, Frankenstein is a 2014 American science fantasy action film written and directed by Stuart Beattie, based on the digital-only graphic novel by Kevin Grevioux. An international co-production between the United States and Australia, the film was produced by Tom Rosenberg, Gary Lucchesi, Richard Wright, Andrew Mason and Sidney Kimmel. It stars Aaron Eckhart, Bill Nighy, Yvonne Strahovski, Miranda Otto and Jai Courtney. The film tells the story of Adam, Frankenstein's creature, who embarks on a dangerous journey to stop evil demons and their ruthless leader from taking over the world. The film was released on January 24, 2014, in the United States and on March 20, 2014, in Australia. The film received extremely negative reviews and was a box-office bomb, grossing $76 million worldwide against a production budget of $65 million.

== Plot ==
In 1795, Doctor Victor Frankenstein creates a monster from corpses and reanimates it. Horrified, Frankenstein attempts to destroy his creation, but the monster survives and murders his wife Elizabeth. Frankenstein pursues it to the Arctic, where he dies from the cold. When the monster returns to bury him, it is attacked by demons but rescued by two gargoyles, Ophir and Keziah. They take it to their cathedral, where the monster meets gargoyle queen Leonore and her second-in-command, Gideon. Leonore explains that the gargoyles were created by the Archangel Michael to fight demons and protect humanity. She names the creature "Adam" and invites him to join them, but he refuses. She gives him baton-like weapons bearing the Gargoyle Order's symbol, which can "descend" demons by destroying their bodies and trapping their souls in Hell.

For the next 200 years, Adam lives apart from society, killing demons that pursue him. In the modern day, he attempts to reintegrate into society but is involved in a fight with demons that results in a police officer's death. The gargoyles imprison him, while a surviving demon, Helek, informs his master, demon prince Naberius, that Adam is alive. Disguised as billionaire Charles Wessex, Naberius employs scientists Terra Wade and Carl Avery to reanimate corpses. He sends demons led by the warrior Zuriel to capture Adam and attack the gargoyles' cathedral.

The attack kills many demons and causes 16 gargoyles, including Ophir and Keziah, to be "ascended" (returned to and trapped in Heaven). Zuriel captures Leonore, intending to exchange her for Adam. Gideon instead offers Frankenstein's journal, found with his body, and secures Leonore's release. Adam follows Zuriel to the Wessex Institute, where he discovers thousands of corpses and learns that Naberius plans to recreate Frankenstein's experiment, using reanimated bodies as hosts for descended demons to rebuild his armies and destroy humanity. Adam retrieves the journal and seeks Terra's help, later descending Zuriel when he attacks them.

Adam warns the remaining gargoyles and agrees to surrender the journal in exchange for his and Terra's safety. Leonore secretly orders Gideon to kill Adam, but Adam ascends Gideon, then burns the journal and destroys its secrets. He leads the gargoyles to the Wessex Institute, where they descend Naberius's lieutenant, Dekar, and battle the demons. Naberius kidnaps Terra and forces her to reanimate the corpses. He overpowers Adam and attempts to have a demon possess him, but fails because Adam has developed a soul. Adam carves the Gargoyle Order symbol into Naberius, descending him to Hell. The collapsing institute destroys the demons and possessed corpses, thwarting Naberius's plan, while Leonore rescues Adam and Terra.

Leonore forgives Adam for Gideon's death, and Adam bids farewell to Terra. He resolves to continue defending the world from demons and declares himself "Frankenstein".

== Cast ==
- Aaron Eckhart as Adam Frankenstein, a superhuman creature created by Dr. Frankenstein
- Bill Nighy as Naberius, a demon prince who poses as Charles Wessex, head of the scientific Wessex Institute
- Yvonne Strahovski as Dr. Terra Wade, a world-renowned electrophysiologist employed by Naberius to research reanimation of dead matter
- Miranda Otto as Leonore, the gargoyle queen
- Jai Courtney as Gideon, leader of the gargoyle army
- Socratis Otto as Zuriel, Naberius' most formidable warrior
- Kevin Grevioux as Dekar, a high-ranking demon who serves as the head of security at the Wessex Institute
- Caitlin Stasey as Keziah, a gargoyle
- Mahesh Jadu as Ophir, a gargoyle
- Nicholas Bell as Carl Avery
- Steve Mouzakis as Helek
- Deniz Akdeniz as Barachel
- Aden Young as Dr. Frankenstein

== Production ==
Kevin Grevioux of Underworld sold the original screenplay to Lakeshore Entertainment in 2010. It is based on his Darkstorm Studios digital graphic novel of the same name. Lakeshore, an independent Los Angeles production company which also produced the Underworld films, brought Stuart Beattie on board to re-write and direct in early 2011. In November 2011, it was confirmed that filming would take place in Melbourne and that Australia's Hopscotch Features would co-produce the film with Lakeshore. The movie's visual effects budget was $6 million.

It was announced on October 7, 2011, that Aaron Eckhart would play the lead role. Eckhart described his character thus: "Frankenstein is an intelligent, evolved man, and that’s how he is portrayed in this movie, for sure." In November 2011, Yvonne Strahovski was cast as the female lead, a scientist working to reanimate the dead, while Miranda Otto was cast as the queen of the gargoyles. Bill Nighy plays the film's villain, whom he described as a "Nasty piece of work; one of the angels descended with Satan." Eckhart and Otto trained for three months with martial arts experts Ron Balicki and Diana Lee Inosanto in the Filipino martial art of Kali for their fight scenes.

Principal photography began on February 27, 2012, based at Docklands Studios Melbourne. Filming occurred in Victoria, Australia over a period of ten weeks, with multiple scenes being filmed at Ormond College. The film created over 500 jobs for cast and crew.

== Release ==
The North American release was originally set for February 22, 2013, and later moved to September 13, 2013. In April 2013 the release date was pushed back again, and saw its world premiere in Buenos Aires on January 20, 2014, after which it was released in 23 countries between January 22 and January 24. It was released in a further nine countries between January 29 and January 31. In February 2013, it was announced the film would be released in 3D.

=== Home media ===
I, Frankenstein was released on DVD and Blu-ray on May 13, 2014.

== Reception ==
=== Critical response ===
On the review aggregator website Rotten Tomatoes, 5% of 104 critics' reviews are positive, with an average rating of 3.4/10. The website's consensus reads: "Loud, incoherent, and dramatically listless, I, Frankenstein is a remarkably dull fantasy adventure that fails to generate much excitement or interest in its characters." Metacritic, which uses a weighted average, assigned the film a score of 30 out of 100, based on 20 critics, indicating "generally unfavorable" reviews.

Mike McCahill of The Guardian gave the film two stars, calling it a "barely functioning multiplex-filler". James Mottram at Total Film also gave it two stars, calling it a "knuckle-headed fantasy".

=== Box office ===
In the United States and Canada, the film was released in a total of 2,763 theaters of which 3D and IMAX comprised 95% of the total theaters. It earned $8.6 million in its opening weekend, which was below expectations. About 65% of the grosses came from 3D showings. It had a successful opening in Russia with $6.3 million from 1,846 screens.

I, Frankenstein grossed $19.1 million in the United States and Canada, and $57.7 million in other territories, for a worldwide total of $76.8 million, against a production budget of $65 million.

== Potential sequels and Underworld crossover ==
Much doubt has been cast over a sequel due to the film's lackluster box office performance, though Kevin Grevioux, creator of the graphic novel and the Underworld film series, had earlier expressed interest in making more I, Frankenstein films along with an Underworld crossover film. He stated in a pre-release interview that, in an early draft of his screenplay, Kate Beckinsale would have made a post-credits cameo appearance as Selene and that there would have been Underworld Easter eggs, but none of this was used.

== See also ==
- List of films featuring Frankenstein's monster
- Frankenstein; or, The Modern Prometheus, 1818 Mary Shelley novel
