= Cerbere =

Cerbere can refer to

- Cerbère, a small town in Southern France on the border with Spain
- Naberius, a demon with several alternative spellings, including Cerberus, Cerbere
