= Soulcrusher =

Soulcrusher and variants may refer to:

- Soul-Crusher, a 1987 album by White Zombie
- Soulcrusher (Operator album), 2007
- "Soul-Crusher" (song), a 1992 song by White Zombie on the album La Sexorcisto: Devil Music Volume One
- "Soulcrusher" (song), a 2007 song by Operator from the album of the same name
- Soulcrusher (video game), 2012; see List of first-person shooters
- Soul Crusher, a fictional magical sword; see List of Record of Lodoss War characters

== See also ==
- The Soul Crush EP, by The Fratellis (2013)
