= Kevin Phillips (actor) =

American actor (born 1981)

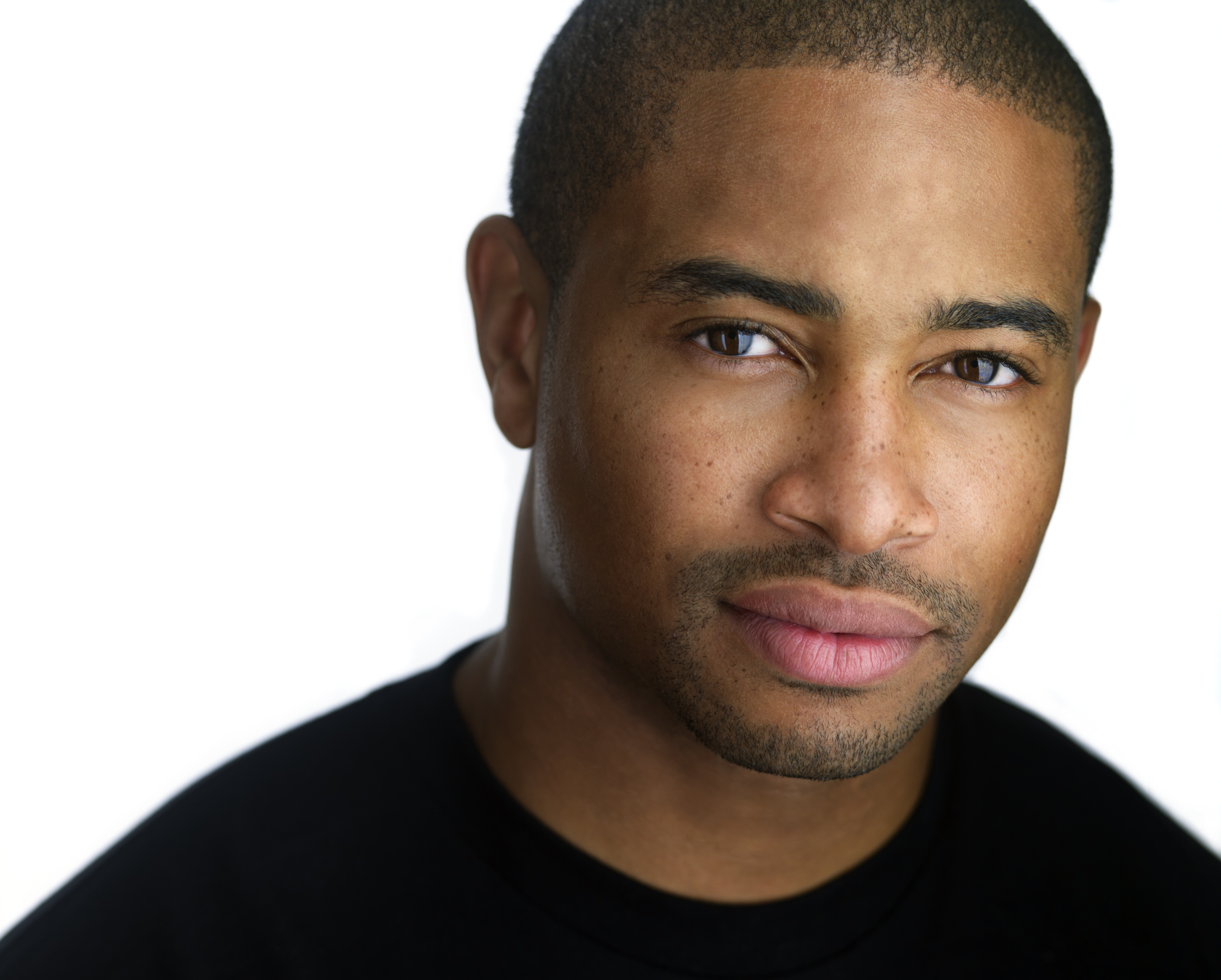
- Born: New York City, U.S.
- Occupation: Actor
- Years active: 2002–present

Kevin Phillips is an American actor, best known for his leading role in Suna Gonera's Pride (2007), as well as his role in 2009's Notorious. Kevin starred in the George Lucas-produced 2012 film Red Tails, which chronicles the story of the Tuskegee Airmen.

== Early life ==
Kevin split his adolescence between Moncks Corner, South Carolina and Brooklyn. In 2000, he decided to leave his basketball scholarship at SUNY-Cobleskill to pursue an acting career. Phillips got his start in an off-Broadway play "A Little Piece of Life" directed by William Hicks.

== Career ==
Kevin's first film credit was a supporting role in Queen Latifah's The Cookout (2004) opposite Tim Meadows. He has also had roles in 2005's American Gun with Forest Whitaker and Donald Sutherland as well as Rock The Paint which premiered at the 2005 Tribeca Film Festival.

In 2008, Kevin finished filming the street-fighting film, Blood and Bone, as well as the musical, Mama, I Want to Sing! starring R&B singer Ciara.

In 2009's Notorious, the biopic of the Notorious B.I.G., Kevin played Mark Pitts, the co-manager of the late rapper.

Kevin also starred as the lead male role in Ciara's "Never Ever" music video in 2009, making it his second time working with the singer.

In 2010, Kevin had a starring role in the indie action film Sinners & Saints.

In 2012, Kevin starred in Red Tails.

In 2013, Kevin appeared in an episode of Shameless.

Kevin played Marley Marl in Roxanne Shante's 2017 biopic, Roxanne Roxanne.

Kevin also appeared in 2018's Unsolved.

In early 2020, Kevin appeared in an episode of All American.

== Filmography ==
- Law & Order: Criminal Intent, (2004), as Ben Watkins (Mad Hops, 1 episode)
- The Cookout, (2004), as Jamal Washington
- Rock The Paint, (2005), as Antwon
- American Gun,(2005), as Reggie
- Pride, (2007), as Andre
- Notorious, (2009), as Mark Pitts
- Blood and Bone, (2009), as Danny
- Sinners and Saints, (2010), as Detective Will Ganz
- House, M.D., (2011), Terry Foley
- Red Tails, (2012), Leon 'Neon' Edwards
- S.W.A.T.: Firefight, (2011), as Kyle Watters
- Mama, I Want to Sing!, (2011), as Luke
- Unsolved, (2018), as Mark Bell
