= Warhorse One =

- Theatrical release poster
- Directed by: William Kaufman; Johnny Strong
- Written by: Johnny Strong; William Kaufman
- Story by: Paul Reichelt
- Produced by: Nicole Kaufman
- Starring: Johnny Strong; Athena Durner
- Cinematography: Joey Nicotra
- Edited by: Johnny Strong
- Music by: Johnny Strong
- Production company: Operator Films
- Distributed by: Well Go USA Entertainment
- Release date: June 30, 2023
- Running time: 126 minutes
- Country: United States
- Language: English
- Box office: $1,001

Warhorse One is a 2023 American war action drama film directed by and written by William Kaufman and Johnny Strong (directorial debut), starring Strong and Athena Durner; Kaufman and Strong also had other roles. The film tells the story of a Navy SEAL Master Chief who accidentally lands in the mountains on the Afghan border. He must lead a child in distress to safety before air support arrives, fighting Taliban rebels along the way.

The film was released in limited release in the United States on June 30, 2023, and on VOD and digitally on July 4, 2023. A sequel is in development.

== Cast ==
- Johnny Strong as Master Chief Richard Mirko
- Athena Durner as Zoe Walters
- Raj Kala as Ahmad Radam
- James Sherrill as Petty Officer James 'G' Wiliker / Castle
- Siya Rostami as Tarad
- Todd Jenkins as Youssef
- Danny Augustus as Jarrah
- Michael Sauers as Chief Petty Officer Mike 'Miller'
- Xander Gòmez as Lewa 'The Hunter'
- David Ibrahim as Abu Bakar
- Steve Mokate as Commander Johns
- E.K. Spila as Assistant Director Dave Mattis

== Release ==
Before Warhorse One debuted at the 2023 Cannes Film Festival and sold international distribution rights, Well Go USA Entertainment had already acquired the U.S. distribution rights. The film will be released in limited release in the United States on June 30, 2023, and will be released on VOD and digitally on July 4, 2023. Warhorse One was a released in DVD and Blu-ray formats on November 7, 2023.
