= Cold Brook (film) =

- Release poster
- Directed by: William Fichtner
- Written by: William Fichtner; Cain Devore
- Produced by: William Fichtner; Kim Coates; Shayne Putzlocher; Sara Shaak
- Starring: William Fichtner; Kim Coates
- Cinematography: Edd Lukas
- Edited by: Kiran Pallegadda
- Music by: Michael Deragon
- Production companies: Anamorphic Media; Roadrunner; Trilight Entertainment
- Distributed by: Vertical Entertainment
- Release date: November 8, 2018
- Running time: 102 minutes
- Country: United States
- Language: English

Cold Brook is a 2018 American fantasy drama film written by Cain Devore and William Fichtner, directed by Fichtner and starring Fichtner and Kim Coates.

Plot

Two best friends and maintenance workers from a small town encounter the restless spirit of an African-American man in need of assistance. Soon, they risk everything to help him.

== Cast ==
- William Fichtner as Ted Markham
- Kim Coates as George Hildebrandt
- Harold Perrineau as Gil Le Deux
- Robin Weigert as Mary Ann
- Mary Lynn Rajskub as Rachel
- Johnny Strong as Ronnie
- Brad William Henke as Chip
- Erich Anderson as Meisenger
- Louis Mustillo as County Clerk
- Charlene Amoia as Miss Simmons
- Pat Asanti as Junior
- Kymberly Fichtner as Vicki

== Release ==
The film was released on November 8, 2019.

== Reception ==
The film has an 80% rating on Rotten Tomatoes based on ten reviews.

Nell Minow of RogerEbert.com awarded the film two stars and wrote that the film's "obvious good intentions lend it a sweetness that cannot make up for insurmountable problems."

Frank Scheck of The Hollywood Reporter gave the film a positive review and wrote, "Hard to pin down, but moving nonetheless."
