= LaMonica Garrett =

American actor (born 1975)

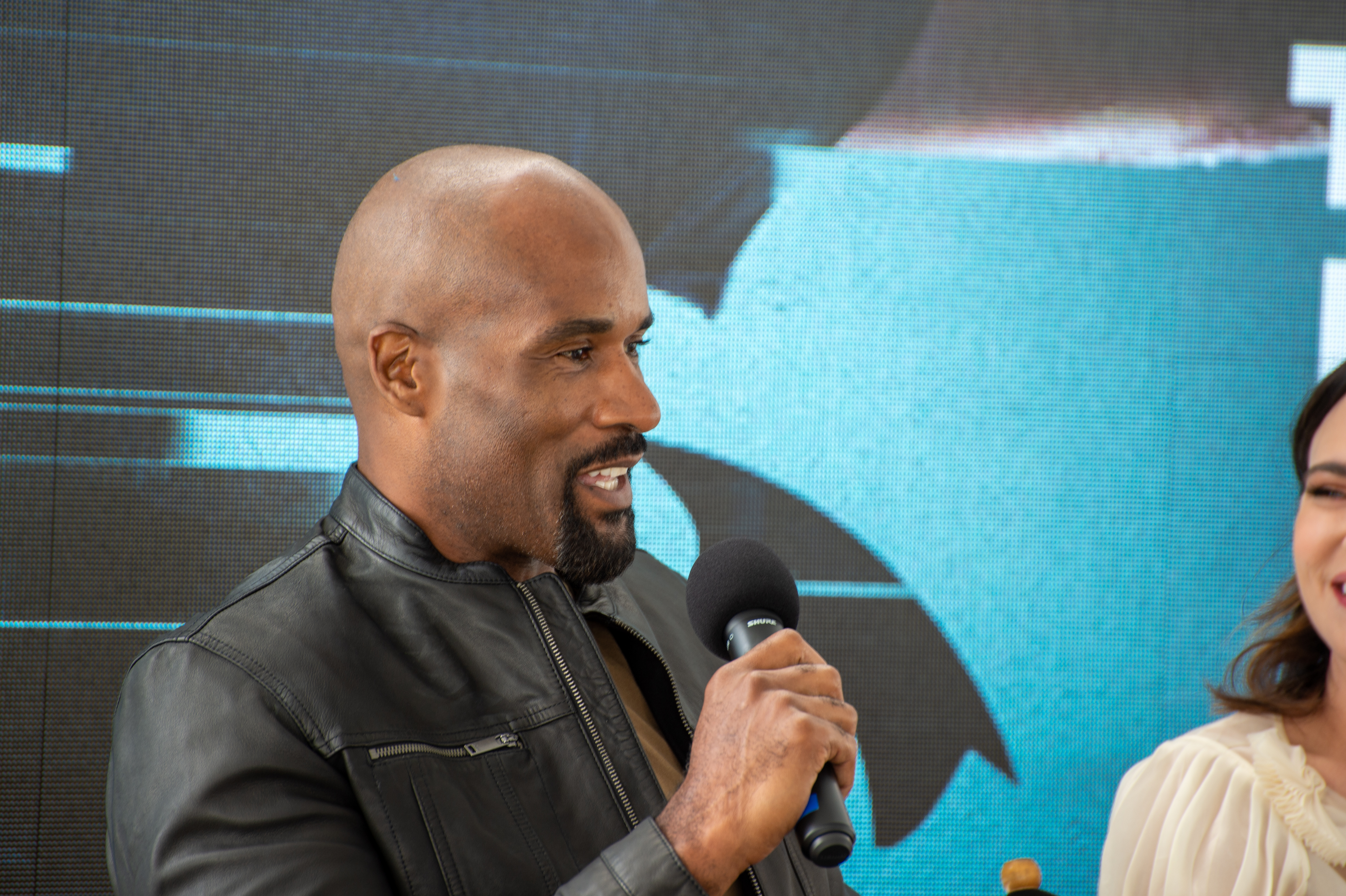
- Garrett in 2022 speaking at a panel for The Terminal List
- Born: May 23, 1975 (age 51); San Francisco, California, U.S.
- Occupation: Actor
- Years active: 2003–present
- Spouse: Mina Ivanova (m. 2017)
- Children: 1

LaMonica Garrett (born May 23, 1975) is an American actor and former professional Slamball player. He is best known for his roles as Deputy Sheriff Cane in the FX series Sons of Anarchy (2011–2014), Mike Ritter in the ABC/Netflix series Designated Survivor (2016–2018), John in Primal (2019), Mar Novu / Monitor and Anti-Monitor in the Arrowverse (2018–2020), Thomas in the Paramount+ series 1883 (2021–2022), and Tucker in the Paramount+ series Lioness (2023).

== Early years and sports career ==
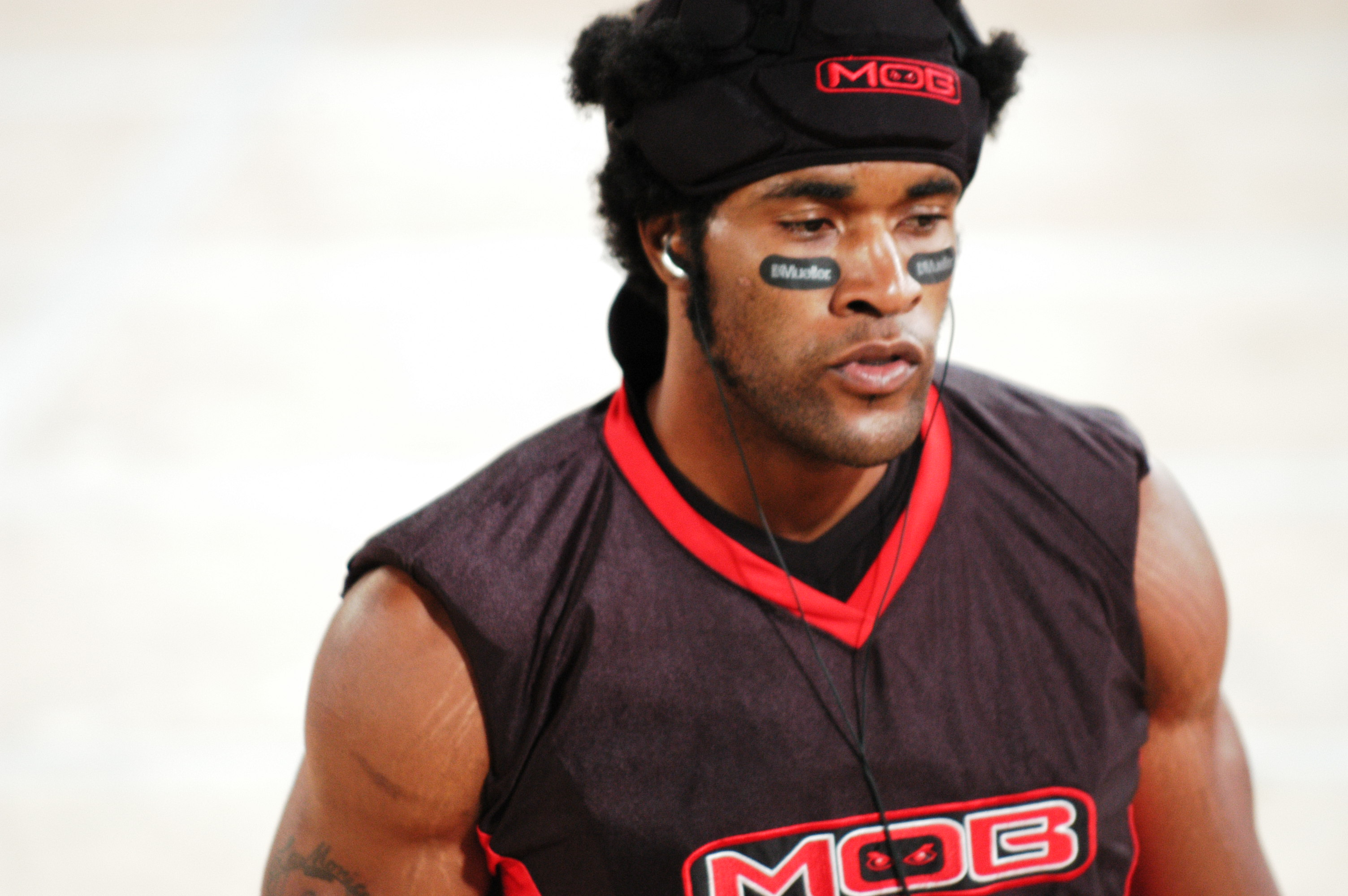
Garrett in 2003 during his Slamball time

LaMonica Garrett was born in San Francisco, California. He was named after former Oakland Raiders quarterback Daryle Lamonica, of whom his parents were fans. During high school, Garrett was a football player. When his family moved to Los Angeles, he and a friend were transferred to Burbank High School. Garrett has said that although his friend made the varsity team, he was held back on the junior varsity team due to his ego and attitude. In an interview with Muscle and Fitness magazine, he refers to this setback as a "wake-up call, which taught him both humility and accountability—and drove him into the gym."

Because of this, Garrett started working out more intensively and managed to excel on offense. After high school, he attended a Los Angeles junior college where he played as a linebacker. Eventually, Garrett transferred to Central State University in Ohio where he continued to play. At one point, he led the team in tackles. Garrett was interested in joining the NFL, but despite having what he called "a great Pro Day" and having some workouts with the Detroit Lions and the Los Angeles Rams, he was not picked up.

Garrett had always been interested in acting, so he moved to Los Angeles to pursue a career in entertainment. In the meantime, he worked as a FedEx driver to pay for acting classes. Garrett also started playing Slamball, a hybrid between basketball and football played with trampolines. During his time playing, he became the league's leading scorer and one of four players announced for the All Slamball Team.

== Acting career ==
While still a Slamball player, Garrett landed a role on an episode of One Tree Hill that had a Slamball-related storyline. After that, he signed with an agent and continued to get minor roles in TV shows like Hawthorne, CSI: Miami, and NCIS, as well as films like Transformers: Dark of the Moon. In 2011, Garrett started a recurring role as Deputy Sheriff Cane on FX's Sons of Anarchy. He appeared in 17 episodes from 2011 to 2014.

In 2016, Garrett landed two key roles; the first one, as Lieutenant TAO Cameron Burk (brother of Lieutenant Carter Burk) on TNT's The Last Ship, and the second as Secret Service agent Mike Ritter on ABC's Designated Survivor. David Guggenheim, creator and executive producer of the latter, said they "needed someone who could throw President Tom Kirkman into a car", but that had "an emotional core goodness". The character of Mike Ritter became a fan favorite and Garrett remained with the show through the first two seasons, until its initial cancelation. After the show was picked up by Netflix, Garrett confirmed on Twitter that after "lengthy negotiations" he would not return due to budget constraints. In late 2018, he was cast as Mar Novu / The Monitor in the Arrowverse crossover event "Elseworlds" on The CW, which connects storylines from The Flash, Arrow, and Supergirl. He reprised the role throughout the spring 2019 episodes of Arrow, The Flash, Supergirl, and Legends of Tomorrow. He was later upgraded to a series regular for those shows, as well as Batwoman, to ensure his availability for all appearances prior to and in the "Crisis on Infinite Earths" crossover. In July 2019, it was announced that Garrett would also be portraying the Anti-Monitor in the crossover.

In 2021, Garrett was cast as Thomas in 1883, a spin-off of the Paramount Network show Yellowstone.

== Filmography ==
=== Film ===
Year	Title	Role	Director	Notes
2011	Transformers: Dark of the Moon	Morshower's Aide	Michael Bay	
2015	Daddy's Home	Marco	Sean Anders	
2019	Primal	John Ringer	Nick Powell	
2019	Clemency	Logan Cartwright	Chinonye Chukwu	
2020	DC: Crisis on Infinite Earths	Mar Novu / Monitor	AListProductions	Short fan film
2025	Osiris	Rhodie	William Kaufman	
2026	Takeover	Sheriff 'Herc' Hitchens	Greg Jonkajtys	
2026	Man of War	Michael Connor	William Kaufman	

=== Television ===
Year	Title	Role	Notes
2002	Dog Eat Dog	Himself	Contestant
2008	One Tree Hill	Jerome	Episode: "Sympathy for the Devil"
2011–2014	Sons of Anarchy	Deputy Sheriff Cane	17 episodes
2012	Suits	Roberto Solis	Episode: "Asterisk"
2012–2013	Mike & Molly	James	2 episodes
2012	Political Animals	Agent Clark	3 episodes
2014	Modern Family	Bouncer	Episode: "Haley's 21st Birthday"
2016–2018	Designated Survivor	Mike Ritter	Main role (season 1-2); 38 episodes
2016–2018	The Last Ship	Lt. TAO Cameron Burk	15 episodes
2018–2019	Supergirl	Mar Novu / Monitor Anti-Monitor	Guest star (season 4), Main (season 5); 5 episodes
2018–2020	Arrow	Mar Novu / Monitor Anti-Monitor	Guest star (season 7), Main (season 8); 8 episodes
2018–2019	The Flash	Mar Novu / Monitor Anti-Monitor	Guest star (season 5), Main (season 6); 6 episodes
2019–2020	Legends of Tomorrow	Mar Novu / Monitor Anti-Monitor	Guest star (season 4), Main (season 5); 2 episodes
2019	Batwoman	Mar Novu / Monitor Anti-Monitor	Main (season 1); 2 episodes
2020	Curb Your Enthusiasm	Officer Harris	Episode: "Insufficient Praise"
2021	Delilah	Casey Landon	
2021	Brooklyn Nine-Nine	FBI Agent Feingold	"The Set Up"
2021–2022	1883	Thomas	Main
2022	The Terminal List	Commander Bill Cox	Recurring role; 5 episodes
2023–present	Special Ops: Lioness	Tucker	Main role

=== Video games ===
Year	Title	Role	Notes
2011	Fight Night Champion	Andre Bishop	
2011	Need for Speed: The Run	Rival Racer 2 / Highway Patrolman	
2019	Call of Duty: Modern Warfare	Sergeant Griggs	
