= Be Like Water =

Play written by Dan Kwong

- World Premiere poster
- Original language: English
- Written by: Dan Kwong
- Characters: Tracy Fong; Ghost of Bruce Lee; Kimiko Fong; Frank Fong; Bruce Lee; Jeremy Morton; Tina Kawai MacDonald; Two Black-hooded Ninjas
- Subject: Asian American family, identity and oppression, Bruce Lee
- Genre: Drama, Asian American theatre
- Setting: Spring, 1978; Chicago - Uptown

Premiere
- Date: September 2008
- Place: East West Players'; David Henry Hwang Theater; Los Angeles, California

Be Like Water (2008) is a play written by Dan Kwong, originally produced at East West Players, in association with Cedar Grove OnStage. The play received its world premiere in Los Angeles on September 17, 2008, directed by Chris Tashima, at East West Players' David Henry Hwang Theater at the Union Center for the Arts in Los Angeles. The story follows a young Asian American girl in 1970s Chicago, who is visited by the Ghost of Bruce Lee.

== Play summary ==
Tracy Fong is a 13-year-old ass-kicking, gung-fu fanatic tomboy, challenged by school bullies, airhead rivals, and a mother who just wants her to be a "normal girl." When bad goes to worse, the Ghost of Bruce Lee appears to teach her the true meaning of strength and the true power of water.

== Characters ==
Tracy Fong
13, Chinese Japanese American. Tomboy-ish, tough, quick-tempered, defiant.
Ghost of Bruce Lee
32, Tracy's mentor, Chinese American. The greatest martial artist in the world. Cocky, intense, philosophical yet funny.
Kimiko Fong
38, Tracy's mother, Japanese American. Elegant, tightly-wound, upper-class roots, can go from cheery to icy in a flash.
Frank Fong
35, Tracy's father, Chinese American. Easy going working-class guy, droll sense of humor, not easily angered.
Bruce Lee
13, Tracy's best friend, Chinese American. Scrawny, nerdy, acerbic wit, great disco-dancer. An unapologetic oddball.
Jeremy Morton
14, School bully, Caucasian. Working-class, tough, angry.
Tina Kawai MacDonald
13, Tracy's classmate, Hapa (Japanese Caucasian). Pretty, fashionable dresser, highly groomed, rather superficial.
Two Hooded-Ninjas
Companions of the Ghost in his Nether-world domain.

== World Premiere company ==
East West Players, Los Angeles, California; Opened September 17, 2009; Closed October 12, 2009

=== Original Los Angeles cast ===
(in order of appearance)

- Ghost of Bruce Lee – Cesar Cipriano
- Tracy – Saya Tomioka
- Bruce Lee – Shawn Huang
- Jeremy – Jonathan Decker
- Frank – Michael Sun Lee
- Kimiko – Pam Hayashida
- Tina – Ariel Rivera
- Hooded Ninjas – Michael Sun Lee, Pam Hayashida, Ariel Rivera, Jonathan Decker

=== Los Angeles production staff ===
- Director – Chris Tashima
- Martial Arts Choreographers – Diana Lee Inosanto & Ron Balicki
- Dance Choreographer – Blythe Matsui
- Set Designer – Akeime Mitterlehner
- Costume designer – Naomi Yoshida
- Lighting designer – Jose Lopez
- Sound Designer/Music Composition – Dave Iwataki
- Projection Designer – Alexander Gao
- Property Master – Ken Takemoto
- Hair, Makeup & Mask Design – Alyssa Ravenwood
- Stage Manager – Ondina V. Dominguez

== Reviews ==
- 9/19/08 review by F. Kathleen Foley for Los Angeles Times
- 9/19/08 review by Cristofer Gross on theatertimes.org
- 10/03/08 review by Lynda Lin for Pacific Citizen
- 10/17/08 review by William Hong on Asia Pacific Arts (UCLA Asia Institute)
- Oct. '08 review by Edward Pollard for Black Belt (magazine)

== Awards ==
- 2009 Backstage Garland's Critics List (Jennie Webb):
  - CHOREOGRAPHY – Ron Balicki, Diana Lee Inosanto, and Blythe Matsui
  - SOUND DESIGN – Dave Iwataki

== See also ==
- Bruce Lee: A Warrior's Journey
