= The Sensei =

2008 film by Diana Lee Inosanto

- Directed by: D. Lee Inosanto
- Written by: D. Lee Inosanto
- Produced by: D. Lee Inosanto; Ron Balicki; Tarik Heitmann
- Starring: Diana Lee Inosanto; Keith David; Kerry Knuppe; Louis Mandylor; Sab Shimono; Emily Kuroda; Tzi Ma; Michael O'Laskey II; Mark McGraw; Michael Yama; Tim Lounibos; Michael Hake
- Cinematography: Mark Rutledge
- Edited by: Reine-Claire
- Music by: Deane Ogden
- Production company: Zen Mountain
- Distributed by: Echo Bridge Home Entertainment
- Release date: 2008
- Running time: 95 minutes
- Country: United States
- Language: English

The Sensei is a 2008 independent feature film, written, produced and directed by Diana Lee Inosanto (credited as D. Lee Inosanto).

== Plot summary ==
Set in Colorado, the story takes place in 1985 during the rise of the AIDS panic. McClain Evans is a gay high school student, constantly the target of bullying in his town. Karen O'Neil is a woman haunted by the death of her pro-boxer fiancé, Mark Corey. After a five-year absence, she returns to her family, who runs a successful martial arts school. When McClain is attacked by three local teens, his mother, Annie, asks Karen to teach her son martial arts so that he can defend himself. Karen's family is fearful of anti-gay retaliation, so Karen is forced to secretly teach McClain at night. When word of this reaches her family, and the small-town community, violence erupts, and family and friendship are challenged, forcing Karen to reveal her own dark and tragic secret to those she loves most.

== Cast ==
- Diana Lee Inosanto as Karen Nakano O'Neil
- Keith David as the Minister
- Michael O'Laskey as McClain Evans
- Kerry Knuppe as Brenda
- Brad Thornton as Larry Blackbelt
- Louis Mandylor as Mark Corey
- Sab Shimono as Taky Nakano
- Emily Kuroda as Flora Nakano
- Michael Yama as Yori Nakano
- Tim Lounibos as Simon Nakano O'Neil
- Tzi Ma as the Buddhist Monk
- Mark McGraw as Rick Beard
- Jonathan Camp as Craig Beard
- Gina Scalzi as Annie Evans
- Bryan Frank as Peter O'Neil
- Michael Hake as Gary O'Neil
- Ron Balicki as Samurai #1 / Sparring Partner Vince

== Awards ==
- Best Feature Writer – La Femme International Film Festival
- Honorable Mention, Best Feature Film – Philadelphia Asian American Film Festival
- Best Screenplay (Feature Film) – Hoboken International Film Festival
