= Monitor (Mar Novu) =

Fictional character from DC Comics

The Monitor
- The Monitor as depicted in Back Issue #34 (June 2009). Art by George Pérez.

Publication information
- Publisher: DC Comics
- First appearance: (in shadows) The New Teen Titans Vol. 1 #21 (July 1982) (fully seen) G.I. Combat #274 (February 1985)
- Created by: Marv Wolfman; George Pérez

In-story information
- Alter ego: Mar Novu
- Team affiliations: Justice League; Hero and Heroines of the Multiverse
- Partnerships: Anti-Monitor, World Forger (brothers)
- Abilities: Cosmic awareness; Resurrection; Reality alteration; Matter manipulation; Dimensional manipulation; Space-time manipulation; Energy manipulation; Telekinesis; Telepathy; Teleportation; Power bestowal

The Monitor or Over-Monitor, also known as Mar Novu, is a fictional character created by writer Marv Wolfman and artist George Pérez as one of the main characters of DC Comics' Crisis on Infinite Earths limited series.

The character began appearing, along with his assistant Lyla Michaels, in numerous DC Comics titles beginning in 1982, three years before the Crisis began in July 1985; these appearances made it seem that he was some sort of weapons dealer for supervillains. This was all part of the setup Wolfman and the staff of DC Comics planned for the Crisis, showing the Monitor currying favor with villains such as Maxie Zeus, prior to calling on the heroes. The Monitor was depicted in the shadows for all of his appearances in DC's mainstream superhero titles, and his face was first revealed in one of their few remaining non-superhero titles, the war comic G.I. Combat issue #274.

LaMonica Garrett portrayed the character on The CW's Arrowverse, debuting during the 2018 crossover Elseworlds. This marked the first live-action adaptation of the character. The character has made subsequent appearances on several shows set in the Arrowverse. The character also appeared in the 2019 crossover Crisis on Infinite Earths.

== Origin of the concept ==
Wolfman conceived the concept of the character long before plans for Crisis on Infinite Earths. He explained it in a 1983 interview in the Comics Journal:

"I had the character about 18 years ago. I called him the Librarian then because I didn’t have a good sense about names and thought that it would be a neat idea to do that. You know, one villain that the whole company could use. I didn’t have to sell it to Marvel, because they already had one universe, but when I came back to DC I indicated that I wanted to do it here. Everyone liked it but forgot to hand out the sheets I gave for their writers. So I have to redo it indicating how far you can take the character from month A to month B. Like for three months you can only show this much and after six months you can show that much, and at the end of a year we can reveal who that character is and start getting into interesting stories that all the writers can pick up on."

== Fictional character biography ==
=== Origins ===
Thirteen billion years ago, the Multiverse was born due to tampering with the creation of the universe by Krona, a scientist from the planet Maltus who was attempting to view the beginning of the universe. As a result of his actions, an infinite number of parallel universes were created, none of them as strong as the single universe would have been. The Monitor and Anti-Monitor are born on the moons of Oa and Qward, respectively embodying the positive and negative universes.

==== The Long War ====
As the evil Anti-Monitor conquered his universe, the Monitor watched him, and, when the Anti-Monitor sensed his presence, they began battling across the dimensional barrier in a war that lasted one million years. A simultaneous attack rendered them both unconscious, and they lay unmoving for more than nine billion years until the Monitor felt his evil counterpart awaken, as a result of another experiment on the creation of the universe by another scientist which resulted in the destruction of that scientist's universe. He found this scientist, a man who would become known as Pariah, and used him to follow the Anti-Monitor's path of destruction in his newly created spaceship.

As the Anti-Monitor consumed worlds with his destructive antimatter, thus increasing his power as his antimatter universe expanded to fill the 'gap' that had been left by the loss of the universe, the Monitor grew weaker. He studied every universe for the means to fight the Anti-Monitor, but, even though countless universes were threatened, he took the time to save an orphaned girl, the only survivor of a shipwreck, and raised her on his ship.

That girl, Lyla Michaels, grew up to become Harbinger, having been granted great powers by the Monitor. The Monitor went so far as to provide supervillains with technology, supposedly for money but in reality as a way to test the heroes and villains of Earth and find out which ones might help his cause.

=== Crisis ===
Death of the Monitor. Art by George Pérez.

When the Anti-Monitor's antimatter wave began approaching the main Earths of the Multiverse, the Monitor directed Harbinger to track down an initial force of fifteen specific heroes and villains the Monitor needed to fight his foe. He explained to them what was going on and sent them to protect giant tower-like devices that he had created on several places across space and time; his plan was to merge the surviving Earths into a single one that could resist the Anti-Monitor's attack. He also sent Harbinger to recover the infant Alexander Luthor Jr., the sole survivor of Earth-Three, who he believed would be of invaluable assistance.

When Harbinger returned, one of her incarnations had been attacked by one of the Anti-Monitor's shadow demons, and that corruption caused her combined self to attack and kill the Monitor. However, he had foreseen the attack and used his death to power the machines that would pull Earth-One and Earth-Two into a netherverse created from the energies liberated by his own death, saving them from the Anti-Monitor's antimatter wall. He left Lyla a recorded message explaining this, trusting that she and the heroes would complete the job and preserve the worlds before their vibration slowed down to an extent where they would destroy each other as they existed in the same place simultaneously.

Harbinger draws the last three Earths (Earth-Four, Earth-S, and Earth-X) into the Netherverse. With help from Pariah, Alexander, and the surviving heroes and villains from the various Earths, she eventually defeats the Anti-Monitor. These actions result in the multiverse being rebooted as a single universe that is an amalgam of the five surviving universes.

=== The Monitors ===
During Infinite Crisis, the multiverse is recreated by Alexander Luthor Jr. and now consists of 52 universes. Luthor's use of the Anti-Monitor's armor to recreate the multiverse acts as a "seed program" to give each universe its own Monitor. The Monitors work as a collective to prevent interaction between the universes that could lead to a new Crisis.

=== Final Crisis ===
A new metafictional origin for the Monitors, including Mar Novu, is given during Final Crisis. In this version, the Monitor was originally a probe sent by the Overmonitor to explore the multiverse, but was overwhelmed by knowledge and split into the Monitor and Anti-Monitor.

=== DC Rebirth ===
In the DC Rebirth relaunch, the Monitor, the Anti-Monitor, and the World Forger were created by Perpetua to guard the positive and negative universes.

== Powers and abilities ==
Monitor's powers were never well defined, but he was able to sense his counterpart's existence in the anti-matter universe and fight with him to a stalemate in Oa's moon using energy powers (though the feedback of the attack placed him in suspended animation for eons).

He was able to save Pariah (and possibly empower him to never die and be always drawn to where the Anti-Monitor was about to strike next) and create an entire satellite headquarters out of nothingness.

As a Monitor, he can, as told by Metron, "Create with a thought".

== Other versions ==
- A Monitor appears in Tiny Titans.
- The Monitors play prominent roles in the comic book continuation of the television series Smallville. However, in the mini-series Smallville: Alien it is revealed that the Monitors are not benevolent, but are actively pursuing the destruction of the Multiverse with one named Ray-Lan having crash landed in Russia. While being held captive he is interrogated by Lex Luthor under orders of the President after his destruction of Earth-Two. Ray-Lan then escapes with a powered exoskeleton to combat the Rocket Reds to search for his ship which is located in Chernobyl escaping Superman. While Lex and Clark explore Monitor's spacecraft, Ray-Lan attacks and in the chaos, Superman saves Lex and destroys his ship, causing shrapnel to kill Ray-Lan via impalement. The Monitor's corpse is taken to the Department of Extranormal Operations for observation.

== In other media ==
Promotional image of LaMonica Garrett as Mar Novu / The Monitor for the Arrowverse's 2018 "Elseworlds" crossover event

- Mar Novu / The Monitor, with elements of Krona, appears in the Arrowverse, portrayed by LaMonica Garrett.
- The Monitor appears in Justice League: Crisis on Infinite Earths, voiced by Jonathan Adams.
- The Monitor appears in the Teen Titans Go! episode "Use It Or Lose It" where he admonishes the Titans for not using their powers correctly, voiced by Michael Dorn.
