= Osiris (film) =

2025 American science fiction film

- Theatrical release poster
- Directed by: William Kaufman
- Written by: William Kaufman; Paul Reichelt
- Produced by: Andrew Lewis; Isaac Lewis; Jon Wroblewski; Christian Sosa
- Starring: Max Martini; Brianna Hildebrand; LaMonica Garrett; Michael Irby; Linda Hamilton
- Cinematography: Mark Rutledge
- Edited by: Sara Kaufman
- Music by: John Roome
- Production companies: XYZ Films; Appalachian Film
- Distributed by: Vertical
- Release date: July 25, 2025
- Running time: 108 minutes
- Country: United States
- Language: English

Osiris is a 2025 American science fiction action film written and directed by William Kaufman. It stars Max Martini, Brianna Hildebrand, LaMonica Garrett, Michael Irby, and Linda Hamilton.

== Plot ==
During a nighttime military operation in a remote desert region, a U.S. Special Forces team led by Sergeant Kelly is ambushed. In the middle of the firefight, the soldiers are mysteriously abducted and vanish from the battlefield. They awaken, disoriented and confined inside translucent stasis pods, aboard a massive, dimly lit alien spacecraft.

As the soldiers recover, the stasis pods suddenly dissolve, expelling them. Exploring their surroundings, the team finds skinned human corpses and unfamiliar weapons and technology. They are soon attacked by alien creatures—tall, eyeless humanoids with armored skin, sharp claws, and energy-based shields. The soldiers fight their way through the corridors using their remaining weapons and scavenged alien gear.

The group encounters Ravi, a young Russian woman. Wary of the team, she explains that the ship collects humans to be processed as food. She joins the group and leads them through lesser-traveled maintenance tunnels. After a series of battles, she trusts them enough to tell them of a safe room. The team follows, eventually dropping down a vent into a pool of bloody water filled with various human remains. Arguing and panic ensues before another survivor named Anya, Ravi's mother, appears and rescues them.

Anya tells the soldiers that she has survived for twenty to thirty years in the ship and that she has a plan to destroy the aliens' communication array with explosives to prevent reinforcements, but to do so, a distraction is needed, so Kelly agrees to draw as many of the aliens away as he can. Although successful at first, one of the aliens, Scars, discerns their plan when the team shows up on a motion sensor, which enables him and other aliens to track them. With the group decimated down to Kelly, Ravi, Nash, and herself, Anya sacrifices herself in a final stand by detonating charges that destroy most of the pursuing aliens and the communication array.

The remaining fugitives reach a hatch leading outside, only for Nash to get killed by Scars, the only alien survivor. After luring Scars into an open hatch and closing it on him, cutting him in half, Kelly finds Ravi looking upwards at an orange glow. Upon climbing some debris, they look out in stunned silence on the destroyed city of Paris.

== Cast ==
- Max Martini as Kelly
- Brianna Hildebrand as Ravi
- LaMonica Garrett as Rhodie
- Jaren Mitchell as Jax
- Michael Irby as Reyes
- Linda Hamilton as Anya
- David Meadows as Gibbs
- Linds Edwards as Nash
- Dawson Towery as Bull
- Stanley White Jr. as Scars

== Production ==
In July 2023, it was reported that a science fiction action film titled Osiris was in development. Principal photography had completed in late 2023 in New Orleans, with William Kaufman writing and directing, and Max Martini, Brianna Hildebrand, LaMonica Garrett, and Linda Hamilton cast in undisclosed roles. Pre-production was completed in spring 2024. Filming began in New Orleans in March 2024, The production spent $6.7 million on-location in Louisiana. In May 2025, Vertical acquired North American rights.

== Release ==
Osiris was released in select theaters in the United States and on video on demand on July 25, 2025.

== Reception ==
On the review aggregator website Rotten Tomatoes, 50% of 18 critics' reviews are positive.
