= Primal (2019 film) =

- U.K. DVD cover
- Directed by: Nick Powell
- Written by: Richard Leder
- Starring: Nicolas Cage; Famke Janssen; Kevin Durand; Jeremy Nazario; Michael Imperioli; LaMonica Garrett
- Cinematography: Vern Nobles
- Edited by: Raúl Marchand Sánchez
- Music by: Guillaume Roussel
- Production company: The Pimienta Film Co.
- Distributed by: Lionsgate
- Release date: November 8, 2019 (United States)
- Running time: 97 minutes
- Country: United States
- Language: English
- Box office: $228,679

Primal is a 2019 action-thriller film directed by Nick Powell and starring Nicolas Cage, Famke Janssen, Kevin Durand, LaMonica Garrett, and Michael Imperioli. The film was shot in Puerto Rico and released in the United States on November 8, 2019.

== Plot ==
Frank Walsh is a skilled big-game hunter specializing in rare and dangerous species. He has recently caught an extremely rare white jaguar in the rain forests of Brazil by illegally tranquilizing it while sitting on a wooden platform high above in a tree. His assistant refuses to help him move the animal because of local superstition. He now expects to sell it to a zoo for a fortune. Frank books a container ship to deliver the jaguar along with other animals to the U.S.

However, US Marshals also need the ship to transport a notorious political assassin and ex-special forces operative, Richard Loffler, who is being extradited in order to be brought to trial. Loffler cannot be transported by plane because he suffers from air pressure-related seizures. He is chained to a chair inside a cage. Navy Lieutenant Dr. Ellen Taylor is the doctor in charge of Loffler's medical needs. Walsh and Taylor butt heads as Taylor finds Walsh to be arrogant and dishonest and tells him so.

On the way to the U.S., Loffler escapes and releases dangerous animals including venomous snakes that Walsh has captured in order to attack his captors and cause mayhem. One group of crew members escape in a lifeboat, leaving Walsh, Taylor, and several others behind on the ship. Loffler kills many onboard and takes Taylor and a young crewman named Rafael hostage, but is eventually subdued by Walsh who uses his expert skills to capture him. He then turns his prized white jaguar loose, which attacks and kills Loffler, while Walsh rescues Taylor and Rafael from a venomous viper.

== Cast ==
- Nicolas Cage as Frank Walsh
- Famke Janssen as Dr. Ellen Taylor
- Kevin Durand as Richard Loffler
- Jeremy Nazario as Rafael
- LaMonica Garrett as John Ringer
- Michael Imperioli as Paul Freed
- Braulio Castillo Jr. as Morales
- Tommy Walker as Forrest
- Sewell Whitney as Scuddy
- Leon Andrew Joseph as Jerome
- Sebastian Vázquez as Shelton
- Rey Hernandez as Prettyman
- Drake Shannon as Miller
- Jaime Irizarry as Delgado
- Pablo Tufino as Diego

== Production ==
In September 2017, it was reported Nicolas Cage would star in the independently produced action film for Wonderfilm Media Nick Powell was set to direct from a script by Richard Leder. Cage stated he was attracted to starring in Primal as he really enjoyed working with director Powell on their previous film Outcast. For his performance in the film, Cage cited Humphrey Bogart's performance in The African Queen for how he'd approach the character and was given a lot of freedom by Powell to ad lib lines.

In March 2018, Famke Janssen joined the cast. The following month, LaMonica Garrett joined the cast.

== Release ==
Primal was released theatrically and on Premium Video On Demand as day-and-date release on November 8, 2019 .

== Reception ==
As of October 2021, on review aggregator Rotten Tomatoes, Primal had an approval rating of 37%, based on 46 reviews. Its consensus read: "Chiefly of interest to Nicolas Cage completists and hardcore B-movie fans, this action thriller suffers from an unfortunate lack of Primal energy." On Metacritic, as of September 2020, the film had a weighted average score of 32 out of 100, based on 11 critical reviews, indicating "generally unfavorable reviews".

D.D. Crowley from Nightmarish Conjurings wrote that: "It’s like Jumanji but with less family-friendly content and more grunting. If you’re looking for a wildly fun action flick, I would highly recommend Primal. It is a hell of a good time". Flickering Myth gave the film a rating of 3 stars out of 5. Film School Rejects appreciated the film, writing that: "Primal at least has the added hook of killer animals which bring some thrills and allow for some fun". Also The Daily Beast called it a fun B-movie. Noel Murray of the Los Angeles Times noted "Alas, “Primal” ends up being more exhausting than awesome. Cage and Durand chew the scenery like trenchermen; and Janssen and Imperioli are far more charismatic than their roles require. But while director Nicholas Powell is a veteran stunt coordinator, his movie is decidedly lacking in eye-popping action... Unfortunately, even by the relaxed standards of trash cinema, 'Primal' is dispiritingly tame."

Simon Abrams in his review for RogerEbert.com gave the film 1.5 stars out of four and stated, "So while 'Primal' is supposed to be a star vehicle for Cage, it's mostly enjoyable for its charismatic ensemble cast and incidental gonzo elements... There's sadly not much more to 'Primal' than that. You might think there doesn't need to be, but there should be an extra something given how enticing the movie appears to be (from a distance)." Dennis Harvey of Variety wrote, "'Primal' isn't just a title that's been used many times, it's now a movie that seems to have put several prior movies in a food processor — to results that are edible, but unsurprisingly don't taste like anything in particular, let alone induce a desire for seconds. That this mashup of too many familiar action-thriller elements doesn't emerge a generic mess is a credit to all involved. That it's passably entertaining but also instantly forgettable comes as less of a surprise." The Hollywood Reporter's John DeFore added, "...when the time comes for Cage to play great-white-hunter, viewers will likely want more. But no film involving Nicolas Cage and a blowgun with curare-tipped darts can be all bad, and Primal gives us at least a little of everything we'd want in this kind of yarn."
