= Anti-Monitor =

Fictional DC comics cosmic supervillain

- The Anti-Monitor as depicted in Who's Who: The Definitive Directory of the DC Universe #1 (March 1985). Art by George Pérez.

Publication information
- Publisher: DC Comics
- First appearance: Cameo: Crisis on Infinite Earths #2 (May 1985); Full appearance: Crisis on Infinite Earths #6 (September 1985)
- Created by: Marv Wolfman; George Pérez; Jerry Ordway

In-story information
- Alter ego: Mobius
- Team affiliations: Weaponers and Thunderers of Qward; Shadow Demons; Sinestro Corps; Black Lantern Corps
- Notable aliases: Monitor, Anti-God, The Destroyer
- Abilities: Superhuman strength, stamina and durability; Enhanced senses; Antimatter manipulation; Cosmic powers; Reality warping; Immortality; Invulnerability; Size manipulation; Dimensional travel; Genius-level intellect; Absorption of entire universes; Power distribution; Energy manipulation; Energy absorption; Energy construct creation

Mobius, also known as the Anti-Monitor, is a supervillain appearing in American comic books published by DC Comics. He first appeared as the main antagonist of the 1985 DC Comics miniseries Crisis on Infinite Earths and later appears as an enemy to the Green Lantern Corps and the Justice League.

In 2009, Anti-Monitor was ranked as IGN's 49th-greatest comic book villain of all time.

LaMonica Garrett portrayed the character as the main antagonist in the Arrowverse crossover "Crisis on Infinite Earths", as well as the Monitor.

== Publication history ==
The Anti-Monitor first appeared in Crisis on Infinite Earths #2 (although he remained in shadow until Crisis on Infinite Earths #5) and was created by Marv Wolfman, George Pérez, and Jerry Ordway. He was believed to have been destroyed in Crisis on Infinite Earths #12, only to return after a long absence in Green Lantern: Sinestro Corps Special #1 (August 2007).

== Fictional character biography ==
=== Origins ===
During the Crisis on Infinite Earths, it was revealed how the existence of all parallel universes in the Multiverse came to be, including the positive matter multiverse and also the anti-matter universe, and how the Monitor and the Anti-Monitor came into existence; when the menace posed by the Anti-Monitor became apparent, several villains were sent back in time to stop him, but were defeated by Krona and the other Oans. Two beings were created, one on the moon of Oa and the other on the moon of Qward. On the moon of Oa, the being known as the Monitor was instantly aware of his counterpart, the Anti-Monitor. By this time the Anti-Monitor had quickly conquered Qward, as well as the rest of the anti-matter universe. In searching for other places to conquer, he also became aware of his counterpart. These two beings battled for a million years, unleashing great powers against each other, but to no avail. At the end of their stalemate, they simultaneously attacked one another, rendering both inert for nine billion years.

In Final Crisis, it was revealed that, in the wake of the birth of the original Multiverse, an unfathomable being of limitless imagination, the original Monitor, or Overmonitor, became aware of the life germinating in the multiverse, occupying the void space in which he resided and which he encompassed. Curious about it and wanting to interact with and know better the lesser life-forms birthed by the Multiverse, he fashioned a probe, a smaller Monitor. Unprepared to deal with the complexity of life and the passing of time, the probe split into two symmetrical, opposite beings: the Monitor, embodying the positive matter and goodness, and the Anti-Monitor, embodying anti-matter and evil.

=== Crisis on Infinite Earths ===
The Anti-Monitor at war with the multiverse's heroes on Crisis on Infinite Earths #12 (March 1986). Art by George Pérez.

In more modern times, Pariah performs an experiment to view the multiverse, similar to the one Krona attempted long ago. This results in the reawakening of both the Monitor and the Anti-Monitor and the destruction of Pariah's universe. The Anti-Monitor rebuilds his army, taking over Qward and using the Thunderers and the Shadow Demons as an army.

The Anti-Monitor releases a massive anti-matter wave, absorbing the energies of destroyed positive matter universes and growing stronger as the Monitor weakens. The Monitor, along with his aide Harbinger, gathers a group of heroes and villains from various alternate universes to combat the Anti-Monitor. One of Harbinger's duplicates is controlled by the Anti-Monitor and kills the Monitor. Before his death, the Monitor creates a pocket universe to contain the remaining realities from the Anti-Monitor's attack.

The actions of the Spectre, empowered by the sorcerers of the surviving Earths, bring the Anti-Monitor to a stalemate. The villains of said Earths, sent to stop Krona from viewing the origins of the universe, fail due to squabbling, allowing Krona to see the hands of the Anti-Monitor and the Spectre struggling for domination, which destroys the multiverse and creates a new, singular universe. The Anti-Monitor, enraged, draws Earth into the anti-matter universe, intending to destroy it. The combined efforts of various superheroes and villains weaken the Anti-Monitor enough for Kal-L to deliver the final blow, destroying the Anti-Monitor by punching him into a star. Luthor, Kal-L, Lois Lane, and Superboy-Prime escape into another dimension.

=== Infinite Crisis ===
The Anti-Monitor's corpse turned into a tower. Panel from Infinite Crisis #3 (February 2006). Art by Phil Jimenez.

In Infinite Crisis, the Superman and Lois Lane of Earth-Two, Superboy-Prime, and Alexander Luthor Jr. are revealed to be observing the events of the newly formed universe, as well as the actions of its heroes, from their pocket universe. They return to the main universe in an attempt to restore Earth-Two, at the expense of Earth-One.

The Anti-Monitor’s remains are recovered from deep space and used as the central component in the construction of a multiverse-tuning tower created by Alexander Luthor, similar to the ones used during the first Crisis. The tower is destroyed during a battle between Conner Kent and Superboy-Prime, during which Conner is killed.

=== Post-Infinite Crisis ===
The Anti-Monitor resemblance seen in the background in DCU: Brave New World #1. Art by Ariel Olivetti.

At the end of DC Comics' 2006 special Brave New World, it is revealed that there are five figures calling themselves "the Monitors" watching over Earth. Four of the figures resemble the original Monitor, while the fifth resembles the Anti-Monitor. In Countdown, it is revealed that there are fifty-two Monitors, with each representing a different universe.

=== Sinestro Corps ===
Prominent members of the Sinestro Corps with a Manhunter at far left, including (clockwise from top left): Hank Henshaw, Superboy-Prime, the Anti-Monitor, Parallax (inhabiting Kyle Rayner), and Sinestro. Art by Ethan Van Sciver.

The Anti-Monitor is reborn following the recreation of the multiverse and influences Sinestro's ideology. He recruits Superboy-Prime, Cyborg Superman, Parallax, and Sinestro as his heralds.

Shortly after, the Sinestro Corps launches an attack on Earth. The Anti-Monitor travels to Earth aboard Warworld along with Sinestro. The Anti-Monitor siphons the positive matter of New York City to create antimatter waves, but is attacked by the Guardians of the Universe. He counters the attack, disfiguring the face of Scar. A vengeful Superboy-Prime, seeing an opportunity to kill the now-weakened Anti-Monitor, flies through the Anti-Monitor's armor and hurls his disintegrating body into space.

The Anti-Monitor's body lands on a dark, lifeless planet, where he is imprisoned in the Black Lantern Power Battery. Scar, corrupted by the Anti-Monitor's energy, dispatches Green Lanterns Ash and Saarek to recover the Anti-Monitor's body.

=== Blackest Night ===
Ash and Saarek find the Black Central Power Battery on the planet Ryut in Sector 666. They attempt to escape the planet, but two monstrous hands emerge from below them and drag them into the ground, killing them.

When the Black Central Power Battery is brought to Earth, the Anti-Monitor stirs within, demanding to be let out, and begins draining Dove's energy to escape. The Anti-Monitor is reanimated as a Black Lantern independent from Nekron's control, his undead body beginning to emerge from the Black Lantern battery. Guy Gardner ascertains that Nekron is using the Anti-Monitor as a source of energy to power the Black Lantern Corps. The Anti-Monitor is attacked by the various Lantern Corps as he is about to free himself from the battery. Combining their energies, the various Lantern Corps use Dove as a human bullet shooting the Anti-Monitor through the head, with the Black Lantern battery recovering him to continue siphoning his energy.

The Anti-Monitor is eventually resurrected by a White Lantern ring and breaks free of the battery, fighting Nekron in revenge for imprisoning him. Nekron then banishes the Anti-Monitor back to the anti-matter universe.

=== Brightest Day ===
The Anti-Monitor as depicted in Brightest Day #3 (June 2010). Art by Ivan Reis.

Later, the Anti-Monitor is confronted by the White Lantern Boston Brand. As Brand is forced by the White Ring to "fight for his life", damaging the Anti-Monitor's chest plate armor, the Anti-Monitor retaliates by firing a burst of anti-matter energy at Brand, who evades the blast. The Anti-Monitor resumes his duties in the anti-matter universe while Brand leaves. He commands Deathstorm to bring the White Lantern battery to him as well as an army, at which point Deathstorm brings back the Black Lantern versions of Professor Zoom, Maxwell Lord, Hawk, Jade, Captain Boomerang, Martian Manhunter, Aquaman, Hawkman, Hawkgirl, Deadman, and Osiris. Deathstorm is thwarted by Firestorm, who reclaims the battery.

=== The New 52 ===
The Anti-Monitor is reintroduced in the Forever Evil storyline, where he is revealed to have destroyed Ultraman's Krypton and Earth-3. As he is seen finishing off Earth-3, the Anti-Monitor declares "Darkseid shall be mine."

When Metron confronts the Anti-Monitor amidst the ruins of Earth-3, it is revealed the Anti-Monitor is the former owner of Metron's Mobius Chair and that his true name is Mobius. He intends to make up for an unknown wrong he regrets, and to this end intends to kill Darkseid with the help of the latter's daughter Grail.

After forcing the Flash to kill Darkseid, the Anti-Monitor cocoons himself in a shell of energy and emerges with a more humanoid appearance. He has the upper hand until Grail appears with Steve Trevor in tow. She has transferred the Anti-Life Equation to him, making him into a new vessel for its power. Now a living weapon under Grail's control, Trevor releases a tremendous blast of power against Mobius, reducing him to a skeleton.

=== DC Rebirth ===
In the DC Rebirth relaunch, it is revealed that the Monitor, the Anti-Monitor, and the World Forger were created by a Super Celestial named Perpetua, who tasked them with monitoring their assigned realms. Anti-Monitor was tasked with preventing the light of creation from breaching the greater omniverse. If Anti-Monitor, his brothers, or Perpetua are destroyed, they regenerate in the Sixth Dimension.

== Powers and abilities ==
Anti-Monitor is one of the most formidable foes ever faced by the heroes of the DC Universe. He is directly responsible for more deaths than any other known DC supervillain, having destroyed thousands of universes. The Anti-Monitor possesses immense strength and durability, the ability to absorb and project energy, and nigh-immortality. Almost the entirety of the DC universe's roster was brought to bear in order to defeat him.

== Other versions ==
- An alternate timeline variant of the Anti-Monitor who successfully destroyed the multiverse appears in the "Chain Lightning" story arc.
- The Anti-Monitor appears in Tiny Titans #12.
- The Anti-Monitor appears in Batman/Teenage Mutant Ninja Turtles. Seeking to merge the Turtles' and Batman's universes and create a reality he can control, Krang kills him and turns his corpse into an exosuit.
- The Aunty Monitor, a parody of the Anti-Monitor, appears in Marvel Comics' What The--?!.
- The Anti-Minotaur, a parody of the Anti-Monitor, appears in Mighty Mouse.

== In other media ==
=== Television ===
- The Anti-Monitor appears in Green Lantern: The Animated Series, voiced by Tom Kenny. This version was an android created by Krona as the "ultimate being", but turned against him before being transported to another universe. In the present, he returns to the main universe and takes control of the Manhunters before Aya kills him and takes control of his body.
- The Anti-Monitor appears in the Arrowverse crossover Crisis on Infinite Earths, portrayed by LaMonica Garrett.
- The Anti-Monitor appears in the DC Super Hero Girls episode "Anti-Hall Monitor", voiced by John DiMaggio. This version is a computer app created by Batgirl to track and avoid Hawkgirl's hall monitor policies. However, it becomes sentient, forms a physical body, and kidnaps Batgirl and her friends in an attempt to enforce order before Hawkgirl destroys it.

=== Film ===
The Anti-Monitor appears in Justice League: Crisis on Infinite Earths, voiced by Ato Essandoh.

=== Video games ===
- The Anti-Monitor appears as a boss and character summon in Scribblenauts Unmasked: A DC Comics Adventure.
- The Anti-Monitor appears as a boss in DC Universe Online.
- The Anti-Monitor appears as a playable character in Lego DC Super-Villains.

=== Miscellaneous ===
The Anti-Monitor makes a cameo appearance in Justice League Unlimited #32.

== Awards ==
- 1986: Won "Favourite Villain" Eagle Award
