= Champions (1997 film) =

- Movie Poster
- Directed by: Peter Gathings Bunche
- Written by: George Francisco (Story); Peter McAlevey; Thomas S. McNamara
- Produced by: Peter McAlevey; Jim Sprague
- Starring: Louis Mandylor; Danny Trejo; Ken Shamrock; Lee Reherman
- Cinematography: John P. Tarver
- Distributed by: Ardustry Home Entertainment
- Release date: May 23, 1997; (Germany)
- Running time: 99 min.
- Country: United States
- Language: English

Champions (fully titled as Karate Tiger 10: Champions) is a 1997 American direct-to-video martial arts action film, starring Louis Mandylor, Danny Trejo and Ken Shamrock. It was written and directed by Peter Gathings Bunche. It was released during the time in the 90s when direct-to-video action movies was going in a huge craze and selling well in the rental markets. It was Louis Mandylor's first starring role as an action star.

== Plot ==
William Rockman (Mandylor) is a champion “Terminal Combat” fighter who retired from the sport after accidentally killing a young man while training. Five years after his retirement, Terminal Combat has been banned by the government and has gone underground. The “new” Terminal Combat is just that; one combatant in each match usually does not live to tell about the experience. When Rockman’s younger brother is killed in one of the underground matches by his old rival, the King (Shamrock), Rockman enters the tournament to exact revenge on the King, not knowing that the King and his wife, Daria, have been enslaved by Max Brito, the tournament’s greedy promoter (Trejo). When it becomes known that Brito intends to rake in huge bucks for a rematch between Rockman and the King (their last fight 5 years before had ended in a draw), and that he also intends to kill the King either inside or outside of the ring (and therefore keep Daria for himself as a concubine), Rockman, the King, and other tournament survivors band together.

== Cast ==
- Louis Mandylor as William Rockman
- Danny Trejo as Max Brito
- Ken Shamrock as The King
- Lee Reherman as Steele Manheim
- Bobbie Blackford as Sergeant Kimberly Pepatone
- Harrison Young as Senator Able
- Robin Joi Brown as Mary
- Kimberly Rowe as Daria
- Rich Rabago as Japanese Master
