= Man of War (2026 film) =

- Theatrical release poster
- Directed by: William Kaufman
- Written by: William Kaufman; Paul Reichelt
- Produced by: Andrew Lewis; Isaac Lewis; Stanimir Stamatov; Yanko Ushatov
- Starring: LaMonica Garrett; Andrew Howard; Linds Edwards; Rosmary Yaneva; Daniel Bernhardt; Jason Patric
- Cinematography: Mark Rutledge
- Edited by: Sara Kaufman; The Sheridan Brothers
- Music by: John Roome
- Production companies: Denton Film.; Irish Channel Studios
- Distributed by: Well Go USA Entertainment
- Release date: July 3, 2026
- Running time: 111 minutes
- Country: United States
- Languages: English; Ukrainian; Russian

Man of War is a 2026 American war action-thriller film directed by William Kaufman, the cast includes LaMonica Garrett, Andrew Howard, Linds Edwards, Rosmary Yaneva, Daniel Bernhardt, and Jason Patric. Set against the backdrop of the 2022 Russo-Ukrainian war, the film tells the story of a former Navy SEAL and CIA operative who ventures into the war zone to rescue his adopted niece who has been kidnapped by Russian mercenaries.

This film released digitally in the United States on July 3, 2026, and on physical media September 8, 2026.

== Plot ==
On February 24, 2022, Michael Connor, a former Navy SEAL and CIA operative temporarily residing in Barcelona, learns that his adopted niece, Riley, who was part of an aid worker program, has been kidnapped by the Skorzeny Group of mercenaries when the Russo-Ukrainian war broke out. With the help of his contact Charlie, Connor obtains Riley's location via her smartwatch and boards a transport plane with a British private mercenary group, entering Kyiv. The British mercenary group, led by former Special Air Service (SAS) member Bunny, is tasked with rescuing a wealthy Ukrainian man who has been imprisoned. Their missions are independent, but they agree to share intelligence when they meet.

After arriving in Kyiv, Connor met with his local guide, Dany, and his family. Connor and Dany follow the signal to Kharkiv, getting caught up in clashes between Russian and Ukrainian forces along the way. Connor's communications with Charlie is discovered by Koniev, the leader of Skorzeny. Koniev discovers that the other party intends to rescue Riley, who is being held captive at the police station. Connor discovers a smartwatch on the body of a Skorzeny mercenary and concludes that Riley may be dead.

Connor and Dany reunite with Bunny and the others in a neighborhood. Bunny reveals that Skorzeny mercenaries were holding several hostages in the police station, and Connor believes Riley might be among them. The group enters the police station through a tunnel and engages in a firefight with a large number of Skorzeny mercenaries. Connor rescues Riley, but the Ukrainian millionaire Bunny intended to rescue has already died, so the group begins their retreat. Koniev leads his mercenaries in a relentless pursuit, resulting in the near-total annihilation of the SAS team members, leaving only Connor, Dany, Bunny, and Riley to fight back. When they run out of ammunition, Ukrainian troops arrives and kills Koniev with tank fire.

The following day, Connor and Riley are able to evacuate to the rear of the front lines with the help of the Ukrainian army. Dany's family is sent to Berlin by Charlie, while Dany volunteers to join the army to fight against the Russian invasion on the front lines.

== Cast ==
- LaMonica Garrett as Michael Connor
- Andrew Howard as Dany
- Linds Edwards as Bunny
- Rosmary Yaneva as Riley
- Daniel Bernhardt as Koniev
- Jason Patric as Charlie
- Antoni Davidov as Laggs
- François Coetzer as Bam-Bam
- Boyan Anev as Flo
- Greg Burridge as Zeus
- Max Kraus as Ringo
- Danny Augustus as Vanka
- Delly Allen as Lisa
- Maria-Radena Bozhkova as Isabel

== Production ==
LaMonica Garrett took on his first leading role in a film with Man of War. The film was shot in Bulgaria. Garrett and director William Kaufman attended a week-long military training camp for the film, with tactical advisor Max Kraus as their instructor.

== Release ==
This film released digitally in the United States on July 3, 2026, and on physical media September 8, 2026.
