= William Kaufman (director) =

American filmmaker

- Occupations: Director, writer, producer
- Years active: 2005–present

William Kaufman, is an American director, screenwriter and producer. His works are mainly low-budget action films, such as Sinners and Saints (2010) and Daylight's End (2016).

== Early life ==
William Kaufman first participated in film shooting in Thailand, where he also attended high school. Because of his father's career, he took his family all over the world, so Kaufman grew up in Japan, Thailand and other places. While parts of Good Morning Vietnam (1987) were being shot in Thailand, Kaufman worked on the set as an uncredited production assistant and as an extra in certain scenes. After serving as a scout in the Army, Kaufman went to school at the University of North Texas in Texas to study special effects; as opportunities arose, he began to pursue action films.

== Personal life ==
Kaufman lives in New Orleans, Louisiana, with his wife Nicole. They have four children.

== Filmography ==
=== Film ===
Year	Title	Director	Writer	Producer	Notes
2005	The Prodigy	Yes	Yes	Yes	
2010	Sinners and Saints	Yes	Yes	No	
2011	The Hit List	Yes	Yes	No	
2012	One in the Chamber	Yes	No	No	
2015	The Marine 4: Moving Target	Yes	No	No	
2016	Jarhead 3: The Siege	Yes	No	No	
2016	Daylight's End	Yes	No	Yes	
2019	Lazarat	Yes	No	No	
2022	Washington's Armor: The Journey	No	No	Yes	
2023	Warhorse One	Yes	Yes	No	Co-directed with Johnny Strong
2023	The Channel	Yes	Yes	No	
2023	Shrapnel	Yes	No	No	
2025	Osiris	Yes	Yes	No	
2026	Man of War	Yes	Yes	No	
TBA	Bethesda	No	No	Yes	Post-production

=== Television ===
Year	Title	Notes
2018–2019	The Price of Fame	2 episodes
2018–2019	Murder Made Me Famous	4 episodes
