= Daylight's End =

- Film poster
- Directed by: William Kaufman
- Written by: Chad Law
- Produced by: Scott Howell; William Kaufman; Chad Law; Jay Stamper; Johnny Strong; Adrian Testolin; Farah White
- Starring: Johnny Strong; Lance Henriksen
- Cinematography: Kelly Riemenschneider
- Edited by: Michael Marco
- Music by: Johnny Strong
- Production companies: Throttle Films; Indigo Pictures; Alternate Ending Films; Carolina Film Works; Femmewerks Productions; Underdogg Entertainment
- Distributed by: Vertical Entertainment
- Release dates: April 16, 2016 (DIFF); August 26, 2016
- Running time: 105 minutes
- Country: United States
- Language: English
- Box office: $11,257

Daylight's End is a 2016 American horror film directed by William Kaufman and written by Chad Law. It stars Johnny Strong as a drifter in post-apocalyptic Texas who agrees to help survivors, played by Lance Henriksen, Louis Mandylor, and Hakeem Kae-Kazim, escape to safety. Mixed martial arts fighter Krzysztof Soszynski plays the leader of vampires that attempt to kill them.

== Plot ==
A virus turns most of humanity into vicious vampires that cannot survive in sunlight, and civilization has been devastated, as the infected house within dark places. Thomas Rourke heads into a small town, where a woman named Sam Sheridan and other survivors are being ambushed by looters. After most of Sam's group is killed, Rourke attacks the looters and quickly kills them all.

Sam tells Rourke there is a group of survivors in an abandoned police station, and many of her fellow survivors are cops, and they even have running water and electricity. As they arrive at the police station, and the sun sets in Dallas, more vampires attack them. Just as they retreat inside the underground garage, a much larger vampire appears, that seems to be leading the pack.

Rourke is questioned by the cops, and he reveals that he drove all the way from New York City. Their leader, Chief Frank Hill, is suspicious of Rourke, stripped of his weapons, and locked in a cell overnight. Sam reveals that her group managed to find a cargo plane, and the survivors plan to use the plane to reach another, much larger survivor colony in Baja California. They plan to leave for the plane first thing in the morning.

While that is going on, several vampires manage to break in and kill some survivors before Rourke gets out of his cell and kills the vampires. The next morning, the survivors are shocked to see that the entrance to the police station's underground parking garage is blocked off. They deduce that the large vampire, known as "The Alpha" is leading the vampires. The survivors then plan to find as many possible running vehicles as they can to move everyone to the plane they found earlier, but Rourke suggests he will attack the vampire's stronghold, an abandoned hotel a few blocks away, and kill The Alpha so that the other vampires will turn on each other, allowing the survivors enough time to escape.

Rourke's team finds the vampires all asleep in the hotel basement, and they plan to put bombs at the basement entrances to kill the vampires, but the Alpha ambushes them, which awakens the rest of the vampires. All of Rourke's team members are killed, and Rourke runs back to the police station with many vampires coming after him. Rourke returns to the police station, only for a large horde of vampires to attack the police station.

Many survivors are killed as they retreat into the station, where the vampirés run amok, killing as many people as they can. The remaining survivors barricade themselves. While being confined, Sam asks Rourke about his reason for going after the Alpha. Rourke tells Sam that the Alpha turned his wife into one of them and that he couldn't leave her like that, so he was forced to kill her, which gave him a reason to kill the Alpha. The survivors fight their way through the horde, and many are killed. Rourke confronts the Alpha, but he is over-matched by the Alpha's size and strength and retreats, looking for cover. Rourke stands in front of the doorway and allows the Alpha to charge him. As they collide, Rourke opens the door and they both tumble out into the sunlight, which quickly kills the Alpha. The survivors load the bus to go to the plane. Sam asks Rourke if he's going to go with them, but he declines, and the bus drives off in one direction while Rourke heads in another.

== Cast ==
- Johnny Strong as Thomas Rourke
- Lance Henriksen as Chief Frank Hill
- Louis Mandylor as Ethan Hill
- Hakeem Kae-Kazim as Chris
- Krzysztof Soszynski as The Alpha
- Chris Kerson as Dugan
- Chelsea Edmundson as Sam Sheridan
- Gary Cairns as Drew
- Mark Hanson as Burton
- Heather Kafka as Earnesta
- Brandon Slagle as "Bunny"
- Sonny Puzikas as Vlad
- Sam Cade as Miss Samantha (uncredited)
- Billie D. Merritt as Brandi, VR Trailer (uncredited)
- Terri Doty as Newscaster (uncredited)

== Production ==
The initial conception came from Chad Law, who had submitted a script to Project Greenlight. Shooting mostly took place in Dallas, including the Dallas Municipal Building, and throughout U.S. Route 66 in Texas. Influences include The Road Warrior, Assault on Precinct 13, 28 Days Later, and the novel I Am Legend.

== Release ==
Daylight's End premiered at the 2016 Dallas International Film Festival in April. Vertical Entertainment released it theatrically in the United States on August 26, 2016. It grossed $11,257 in the UAE. On home video, it grossed $106,032.

== Reception ==
Mike Wilson of Bloody Disgusting wrote that Daylight's End is neither cerebral nor original, but it is "still an enjoyable romp". Hugo Ozman of Screen Anarchy called it "a solid thriller" and said that Kaufman should be given the opportunity to direct a big budget film. Mark L. Miller of Ain't It Cool News said that the film is essentially a copy of various 1980s action films, but it has enough well-shot action scenes to make up for this.
