= Soulcrusher (Operator album) =

Studio album by Operator
- Released: August 21, 2007
- Studio: Capitol Studios, Hollywood, California and House of Blues Studios, Encino, California
- Genre: Hard rock; post-grunge; alternative metal
- Label: Atlantic
- Producer: Bill Appelerry

Singles from Soulcrusher
- 1. "Soulcrusher" Released: May 22, 2007; 2. "Nothing to Lose" Released: September 25, 2007; 3. "Delicate" Released: April 1, 2008

Soulcrusher is the debut album by American hard rock band Operator. The album sold over 110,000 copies and peaked at number 14 on the Billboard Heatseekers chart.

== Use in media ==
- The song "The Only One" was used as the theme song for the first season of the television series UFO Hunters.
- The song "Nothing to lose" was used in the hit game Burnout Paradise.
- The song "The Only One" was originally the song Bryan Bay uses in the AGK Series but due to copyright, it got changed.
- The song "Soulcrusher" was used in both games MX vs. ATV Untamed and Madden NFL 08.

== Track listing ==
All tracks written by Johnny Strong, except where noted.

1. "Soulcrusher" – 3:35
2. "Nothing to Lose" (Strong, Wade Carpenter, Doug Dunnam, Paul Phillips) – 3:52
3. "Make 'Em Pay" – 3:55
4. "So Little Time" – 3:47
5. "Delicate" – 4:26
6. "What You Get" – 4:34
7. "The Only One" – 2:50
8. "Burn Up the Road" – 3:47
9. "Black Cloud" – 4:15
10. "Good Enough" (Strong, Phillips) – 3:46
11. "Live Your Way" (Strong, Phillips) – 7:39

== Personnel ==
- Johnny Strong – lead vocals, guitar, bass guitar
- Paul Phillips – rhythm guitar, backing vocals
- Ricki Lixx – lead guitar, backing vocals
- Wade Carpenter – bass guitar, backing vocals
- Dorman Pantfoeder – drums, percussion

== Singles ==
Year	Single	Chart	Position
2007	"Soulcrusher"	Mainstream Rock Tracks	8
2007	"Soulcrusher"	Modern Rock Tracks	29
2007	"Nothing to Lose"	Mainstream Rock Tracks	23
