= The Hit List (2011 film) =

- DVD cover
- Directed by: William Kaufman
- Written by: Chad Law; Evan Law
- Produced by: Freddy Braidy; Rich Cowan; Johnny Martin
- Starring: Cuba Gooding Jr.; Cole Hauser
- Cinematography: Mark Rutledge
- Edited by: Jason A. Payne
- Music by: Deane Ogden
- Production companies: Motion Picture Corporation of America; North by Northwest Entertainment; Stage 6 Films
- Distributed by: Sony Pictures Home Entertainment
- Release date: May 10, 2011
- Running time: 91 minutes
- Country: United States
- Language: English
- Budget: $6 million

The Hit List is a 2011 American action thriller film directed by William Kaufman. The film stars Cuba Gooding Jr., Cole Hauser, Jonathan LaPaglia and Ginny Weirick. The film was released on direct-to-DVD in the United States on May 10, 2011.

== Plot ==
Jonas Arbor (Cuba Gooding Jr.), a former U.S. government operative, wakes from a disturbing dream about a violent operation, then watches a news broadcast featuring controversial reporter Jim O'Bannon.

Meanwhile, mid-level engineer Allan Campbell (Cole Hauser) is under pressure. He owes a large debt to loan shark Dom Estacado, who threatens to kill him if he doesn't pay up, and he's counting on a promotion at work to bail him out. Instead, his coworker Brian Felzner gets the job, and Allan is publicly humiliated and then brushed off when he confronts his boss, Fred Gates. Furious, Allan heads home, finds his best friend Mike Dodd leaving his apartment, and suspects Mike is having an affair with his wife, Sydney. After a tense exchange, Allan storms off to a bar.

At the bar, Allan sees news of O'Bannon's murder and meets Jonas, who claims to be a professional killer. Assuming it's a joke, a drunk Allan vents about everyone who's wronged him. Jonas suggests he write a "hit list," and Allan scribbles down five names: Gates, Felzner, Estacado, Mike, and Sydney — not realizing the list is anything more than drunken venting.

That night, Jonas kills Gates. Allan quickly realizes Jonas was telling the truth, and Jonas informs him that he intends to work through the entire list — the only way to stop him is for Allan to kill him. Allan tries to warn Felzner and contacts Detective Neil McKay, but Jonas runs Felzner down with a car before finishing him off, then kidnaps Allan and evades the police.

Jonas and Allan next go after Estacado. Jonas kills his men, wounds Estacado, and orders Allan to finish him off; Allan refuses, so Jonas does it himself. In the chaos, Allan escapes but is arrested and becomes the prime suspect in the murders.

Sydney lies to police, claiming Allan was with her the night Gates died. Allan tells McKay the truth about Jonas and the list, and McKay comes to believe Allan is an unwilling pawn. Investigators learn Jonas is a rogue former government operative now being hunted by his own agency.

Jonas kills the officers guarding Mike Dodd, impersonates a cop to get to him, and later kills Mike with a bomb outside the police station. He then storms the station itself, kills several officers including McKay's superior, and shoots Sydney in the leg while chasing her and Allan through the building. Allan hides Sydney and faces Jonas alone, ultimately killing him and ending the spree.

Police arrive to find Allan and Sydney beside Jonas's body. Sydney is taken to the hospital, and Allan is cleared of all charges once authorities conclude he was manipulated and coerced throughout the ordeal. The film ends with Allan and Sydney reunited, having survived.

== Cast ==
- Cuba Gooding Jr. as Jonas Arbor
- Cole Hauser as Allan Campbell
- Jonathan LaPaglia as Detective Neil McKay
- Ginny Weirick as Sydney Campbell
- Sean Cook as Brian Felzner
- Drew Waters as Mike Dodd
- Michael Papajohn as Agent Drake Ford
- Brandon O'Neill as Dom Estacado
- J.P. O'Shaughnessy as Lieutenant Ben Harp
- David Andriole as Detective Ray Lowery
- Harrison Seaborn also as Jail Inmate #3
- Sonny Puzikas as FBI Special Agent Keith Klein

== Production ==
Actor Christian Slater, who also starred with Cuba Gooding Jr. in Lies & Illusions as well as Sacrifice, was originally rumored to play the part of Allan Campbell. Slater co-starred with Hauser in the film Shadows of the White Nights.

The writers of Hero Wanted, and also starring Cuba Gooding, Jr., penned the screenplay, while several of the producers of Hero Wanted, End Game, and Wrong Turn at Tahoe produced.

Director William Kaufman of the 2005 indie action thriller The Prodigy was chosen to direct.

Filming took place in Spokane, Washington in early 2010. The local police in Spokane refused to officially participate in the film's production because of the film's depiction of violence toward police officers. This is due to the 2009 shooting of Lakewood, Washington, police officers, which occurred two months before principal photography began.

== Home media ==
DVD was released in Region 2 in the United Kingdom on 9 May 2011, and also Region 1 in the United States on May 10, 2011, it was distributed by Sony Pictures Home Entertainment.
