= Sinners and Saints (film) =

- Theatrical release poster
- Directed by: William Kaufman
- Written by: William Kaufman; Jay Moses
- Produced by: Mark Clark; Ron Balicki; Colby Mitchell; Leon Dunn
- Starring: Johnny Strong; Kevin Phillips; Costas Mandylor; Sean Patrick Flanery; Bas Rutten; Method Man; Kim Coates; Tom Berenger
- Cinematography: Mark Rutledge
- Edited by: Russell White
- Music by: Johnny Strong
- Production company: Noire Blanc Films
- Distributed by: Anchor Bay Entertainment
- Release date: June 30, 2010
- Running time: 104 minutes
- Country: United States
- Language: English

Sinners and Saints is a 2010 American action film directed by William Kaufman; co-written by Kaufman and Jay Moses; and starring Johnny Strong, Kevin Phillips, Costas Mandylor, Sean Patrick Flanery, Bas Rutten, Method Man, Kim Coates and Tom Berenger. The film is set in the dark underbelly of New Orleans. It was released by Anchor Bay Entertainment on DVD and Blu-ray on January 10, 2012.

== Plot ==
Sean Riley, a detective with the New Orleans Police Department, is emotionally drained since the death of his young son and resulting end of his marriage. He is further troubled by the death of his partner, Det. Dave Besson. Riley's commander, Captain Trahan, assigns Riley to investigate a series of murders involving victims who have been burned. One of the victims is the younger brother of infamous gangster Weddo, which has sparked a gang war in the city.

Riley is approached by Colin, a friend he had lost touch with. Colin tells Riley that since they served in the military together, he has gotten various freelance jobs with a private security company called Spartan.

Riley is assigned a new partner, Detective Will Ganz, a stable family man. They stumble into a group of mercenaries in the act of burning another victim, and a shootout ensues.

Riley and Ganz learn that a man named Raymond Crowe hired the mercenaries. As the investigation continues, Riley learns that Colin is in possession of incriminating evidence against Spartan: a video of the same mercenaries from the shootout executing innocents while on assignment. When the partners track down Colin, they are attacked by the mercenaries, now revealed to be Spartan Security. A mortally wounded Colin blows up the house he is in so that Riley and Ganz can escape.

When Riley learns from Captain Trahan that the city wants to blame Riley for the disastrous results of the investigation, Riley decides to take matters into his own hands. Trahan goes to Riley's home to try to talk him out of it, but is ambushed and killed by Dekker, a leader of the Spartan mercenaries. Dekker attacks Riley, but Riley manages to kill him.

Riley learns that Crowe has kidnapped Ganz. He breaks into Crowe's stronghold and kills the remaining mercenaries. Crowe manages to escape, as Riley gives chase. Crowe manages to shoot Riley, but Riley shoots him down in the street. Riley is about to kill Crowe, with Ganz shouting at him to do it, but Riley decides not to. Weddo and his gang arrive and take Crowe with them, presumably to kill him.

Later, Riley visits Ganz's child's birthday party, then visits the cemetery where his own son is buried.

== Cast ==
- Johnny Strong as Detective Sean Riley
- Kevin Phillips as Detective Will Ganz
- Costas Mandylor as Raymond Crowe
- Sean Patrick Flanery as Colin
- Bas Rutten as Dekker
- Method Man as "Weddo"
- Kim Coates as Detective Dave Besson
- Tom Berenger as Captain Trahan
- Jürgen Prochnow as Mr. Rhykin
- Jolene Blalock as Stacy
- Louis Mandylor as Cole
- Brooklyn Sudano as Beth Ganz
- Maya Stojan as Nadja
- Matt Beckham as Detective Moe Tillman
- Jake La Botz as Melvin
- Jessica Heap as Becky
- Jay Moses as Sonny
- Holt Boggs as Detective Tom Wyatt
- Mark Hanson as Griffin "Griff"
- Magic as Dwayne
- Ross Britz as Jerry
- Sonny Puzikas as Renko
- Ron Balicki as Rucker
- Jack Brunacini Jr. as Dunn
- Evan Karagias as Lynch
- Lew Knopp as Slater
- Willie Laureano as Cruz
- Michael Marco as The Snitch
- Taylor Faye Ruffin as Sara Ganz
- Glen Vorhis as Vaughn
- Johnny Walters as Willis
- Justin A. Williams as "Dre"
- Barbara Dalla-Riva as Call Girl
