= Naberius =

Goetic demon

Seal of Naberius (Ars Goetia)

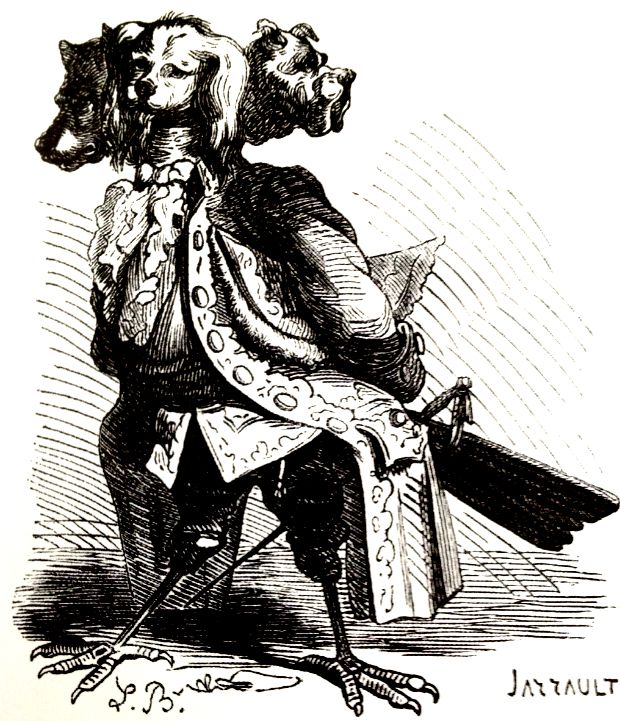
Naberius depicted in the Dictionnaire Infernal by Jacques Collin de Plancy (drawing by Louis Le Breton, engraving by Jarrault)

The demon Naberius was first mentioned by Johann Weyer in 1583. He is supposedly the most valiant Marquess of Hell, and has nineteen legions of demons under his command. He makes men cunning in all arts (and sciences, according to most authors), but especially in rhetoric, speaking with a hoarse voice. He also restores lost dignities and honors, although to Johann Weyer, he procures the loss of them.

== Description ==
Naberius appears as a three-headed dog or a raven. He has a raucous voice, but presents himself as eloquent and amiable. He teaches the art of gracious living. He has also been depicted as a crow or a black crane.

Concerning his name, it is unclear if there is an association with the Greek Cerberus. It is said that in 1583, Johann Weyer considered both of them to be the same demon. He claimed:

Naberius [Naberus], alias Cerberus, is a valiant marquesse, showing himself in the form of a crow, when he speaks with a hoarse voice: he makes a man amiable and cunning in all arts, and special in rhetoric, he procures the loss of prelacies and dignities: nineteen legions hear (and obey) him.

Other spellings include Cerbere, Cerberus, Naberus and Nebiros.

== See also ==
- The Lesser Key of Solomon

== Sources ==
- S. L. MacGregor Mathers, A. Crowley, The Goetia: The Lesser Key of Solomon the King (1904). 1995 reprint: ISBN 0-87728-847-X.
