= Johnny Strong =

American actor (born 1974)

- Born: John Christopher Strong; July 22, 1974 (age 52); Los Angeles County, California, U.S.
- Genres: Alternative rock; hard rock; alternative metal
- Occupations: Actor; composer; musician; singer; songwriter
- Instruments: Vocals; guitar; bass; drums; piano
- Years active: 1996–present (acting)
- Labels: RCA; Atlantic

John Christopher Strong (born July 22, 1974) is an American actor, composer, and musician. He is best known for his roles in Black Hawk Down (as Medal of Honor recipient Randy Shughart) and The Fast and the Furious as Leon. Aside from acting, Strong is also the lead vocalist and founder of the band Operator, movie composer, movie writer, and movie producer.

== Early life and education ==
Johnny Strong was born in Los Angeles County, California. At the age of seven he began studying martial arts, taking up Judo in the San Fernando Valley. He went on to learn Kickboxing, Jeet Kune Do, Boxing, and eventually earned a black belt in Brazilian Jiu-Jitsu under Chris Lisciandro. At 12, he began to play Guitar and taught himself to play Drums, and Piano.

== Career ==
=== Music ===
He was signed to two major labels RCA and Atlantic Records. He has released nine albums: Bombthreat: Before She Blows and Fly and Lick My Neck Good Sleep with his former band, and Can You Hear Me Now?, La Luna Del Diablo Blanco, Soulcrusher, The War of Art, Close to Extinction, War Horse and White Light with Operator band.

=== Film ===
Johnny Strong has had various roles in television, and landed a role in the Steven Seagal film, The Glimmer Man. He then worked on Sylvester Stallone film, Get Carter (2000), also The Fast and the Furious (2001), and Black Hawk Down (2001). Strong stars in Sinners & Saints film, marked his return to the screen, as Detective Sean Riley, a New Orleans-based police thriller featuring Sean Patrick Flanery and Tom Berenger, filmed in 2010 but released on DVD in 2012. One of the songs in the film, Let you go, is sung by Strong.

== Personal life ==
He was married on December 10, 1997, to Alexandra Holden, but they have since divorced.

== Filmography ==
Film
Year	Film	Role	Notes
1996	Seduced by Madness: The Diane Borchardt Story	Tim	Actor
1996	The Glimmer Man	Johnny Deverell	Actor
1996	Time Well Spent	Lloyd Clevenger	Actor
1997	On the Edge of Innocence	Squeamich	Actor
1997	Don't Eat the Chili at the Detour Diner	Gavin	Actor
1998	Bury Me in Kern County	Oldie	Actor
2000	Get Carter	Eddie	Actor
2001	The Fast and the Furious	Leon	Actor
2001	Black Hawk Down	Sergeant First Class Randall Shughart	Actor
2010	Sinners and Saints	Detective Sean Riley	Actor and composer
2014	Elwood	David "Davey Boy"	Actor
2016	Daylight's End	Thomas Rourke	Actor, producer and composer
2018	Cold Brook	Ronnie	Actor
2020	Invincible	Cameron "Cam" Devore	Actor, writer and composer
2023	Warhorse One	Master Chief Richard Mirko	Actor, writer, composer, editor and Co-director
