= Louis Mandylor =

Australian actor (born 1966)

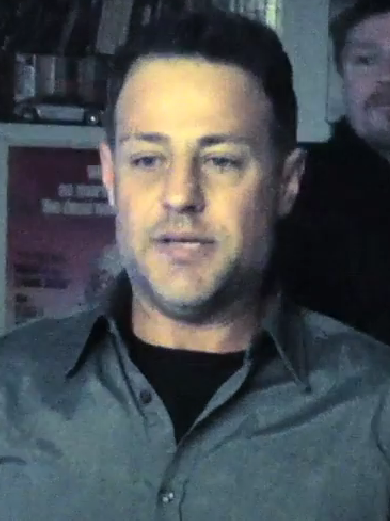
- Mandylor in 2013
- Born: Elias Theodosopoulos; 13 September 1966 (age 60); Melbourne, Australia
- Occupation: Actor
- Years active: 1990–present
- Relatives: Costas Mandylor (brother)

Louis Mandylor (born Elias Theodosopoulos; 13 September 1966) is an Australian film and television actor. He is best known for playing Nikos "Nick" Portokalos in the My Big Fat Greek Wedding franchise (2002–2023).

== Early life ==
Mandylor was born in Melbourne, Victoria, Australia, the son of Greek immigrants. He is the younger brother of fellow actor Costas Mandylor. He and his brother took a shorter version of their mother's last name, citing their paternal last name as being too long.

He played for Heidelberg United FC (Megas Alexandros) in their 1988 State League championship team. He also played five National League games in 1989 and scored one goal.

During his football career, he was also boxing in Melbourne, winning 14 fights with 4 losses. He then emigrated to the United States to originally pursue a boxing career and then subsequently an acting career.

== Career ==
Mandylor played Nick Portokalos in My Big Fat Greek Wedding (2002); he reprised the role in its spin-off TV series My Big Fat Greek Life (2003) and the movie sequels My Big Fat Greek Wedding 2 (2016) and My Big Fat Greek Wedding 3 (2023).

He made a guest appearance on Relic Hunter with Tia Carrere. He played Louis Malone in the first season of Martial Law alongside Sammo Hung. Mandylor appeared in the sitcom Friends, pretending to be Joey's twin in "The One With Unagi". (Ironically, during the original casting for the series, Mandyler had auditioned for the part of Joey, but Matt LeBlanc was selected instead of him. According to director Kevin S. Bright, the choice between the two of them "went down to the wire".) He appeared twice on CSI: Miami; in the third season (2004) as a robber/killer, and in a different role in the eighth season (2009).

He and his brother Costas have acted alongside each other in the Charmed episode "Saving Private Leo" (2002), the crime thriller Sinners and Saints (2010) and "My Brother Cicero" (1998), a short movie which Louis wrote and produced. Louis portrayed Deputy Lloyd in the Syfy thriller film The Cursed; he stars alongside his brother Costas. One of his more popular roles was that of Bobby DeLuca in the film Suckers (2001), where he plays a good-guy turned car salesman.

== Filmography ==
=== Film ===
Year	Title	Role	Notes
1991	Necessary Roughness	McKenzie	
1995	Life 101	Donnie	Video
1995	The Set-Up	Pauly	
1996	The Quest	Riggi	
1997	Champions	William Rockman	
1997	Criminal Affairs	Clint Barker	
1998	My Brother Cicero	Nicky	Short
1998	Jane Austen's Mafia!	Middle Aged Vincenzo	
1998	Renegade Force	Peter Roth	
1999	Jack of Hearts	Detective Jack Newland	
1999	Enemy Action	Price	
2000	Price of Glory	Davey Lane	
2000	Warm Texas Rain	Angel	Video
2001	Sticks	–	
2001	Double Deception	Luke Campbell	
2001	Suckers	Bobby DeLuca	
2002	Angel Blade	Kiel Parsons	
2002	My Big Fat Greek Wedding	Nikos "Nick" Portokalos	
2002	Hitters	Detective Monroy	
2003	Betrayal	Frank Bianci	
2003	Gang of Roses	Sheriff "Shoeshine" Michel	
2003	White Rush	Chick	
2003	Jimmy Bones	Jimmy Bones	Directorial debut
2003	Rumble	Paul	Short
2005	The Game of Their Lives	Gino Pariani	
2007	Redline	Arms Dealer	
2007	Take	Terrell	
2007	Saturday Morning	Frankie Cicotelli	
2008	The Drum Beats Twice	Leroy	
2008	The Sensei	Mark Corey	
2008	Golden Goal!	Paolo Del Monte	
2009	In the Eyes of a Killer	Jack	Also Director
2009	Silent Venom	Jake Goldin	Video
2009	Devil's Land	Detective Pappas	Short
2009	Wrong Turn at Tahoe	Stephen	
2009	No Time to Fear	Dr. Sheridan	
2010	The Cursed	Lloyd Muldoon	
2010	Sinners & Saints	Cole	
2010	The Prometheus Project	Marcus	
2010	Stained	Pastor Phillip	Short
2010	Hung Out to Dry	–	Short
2010	Gerald	Gerald	
2010	Bare Knuckles	Nedish	
2011	Not Another Not Another Movie	NASA Guy	
2011	The Dog Who Saved Halloween	Kent	TV movie
2011	Life at the Resort	Todd Harvey	
2012	One in the Chamber	Demyan Ivanov	
2012	A Green Story	Peter	
2012	Sorority Party Massacre	Mayor Bud Carson	
2013	616: Paranormal Incident	Ness	
2013	The Perfect Summer	Marcos	
2013	Persephone	Jack Aidoneus	Short
2014	20 Feet Below: The Darkness Descending	"Lockeheed"	
2014	The Takeaway	–	
2014	Legacy of the Tengu	Carson	
2014	Elwood	The Watcher	Short, Director
2014	Tension(s)	Jake Lamar	
2014	In 10 Easy Steps	Senior Detective Maurice Roper	
2014	Alone Together	Henry Stratton	Short
2014	The Blackout		Also Director
2015	AWOL-72	Ray	
2015	The Mourning	David	
2015	Adventures of a Pizza Guy	Jack Puncher	
2016	Broken Promise	Reese Sinclair	TV movie
2016	My Big Fat Greek Wedding 2	Nikos "Nick" Portokalos	
2016	Beyond the Game	Carlo	
2016	Daylight's End	Ethan Hill	
2016	Code of Honor	Detective Peterson	
2016	The Sex Trip	Steve Burns	
2016	Hotel of the Damned	Nicky	
2016	The Demo	David Sanders	
2017	The Twin	Jake	TV movie
2017	The Matadors	Uncle Peter	
2017	Larceny	Senator Tom Pumple	
2017	Intrepid	–	Short
2017	California Dreaming	Agent Csokas	
2017	Spreading Darkness	Byron Fresnel	
2017	The Intruders	Mark	
2017	Deadly Delusion	Robert Turner	TV movie
2018	Blindsided	Jack	Also Director
2018	Battle Drone	Vincent Reikker	
2018	Dirty Dead Con Men	Agent Daniels	
2018	The Debt Collector	Sulinski "Golden Boy" Baker / "Sue"	
2018	Astro	Viktor Khol	
2019	Lazarat	Rei	
2019	I Almost Married a Serial Killer	Rafael (II)	TV movie
2019	Night Walk	The Prison Warden	
2019	Avengement	Detective O'Hara	
2019	The Mercenary	LeClerc	
2019	Rambo: Last Blood	Sheriff	
2019	Doom: Annihilation	Chaplain Glover	
2020	Debt Collectors	Sulinski "Golden Boy" Baker / "Sue"	
2020	Legacy	Frank	
2020	The Doorman	Martinez	
2021	Frankenstein	De Lacey	
2021	Ave Marie	Major Maitland	
2021	Antidote	Dr. Aaron Hellenbach	
2021	Impropriety	Doug Larson	TV movie
2021	Denard Anatomy of An Antihero	Dr. Cooper	
2021	Christmas Down Under	Santa	Also Director
2022	Memory	Drunk Broker	
2022	Borrowed Time III	Dr. Cooper	
2022	Sally Floss: Digital Detective	Bill	
2022	Blowback	Dr. Cooper	
2022	Bring Him Back Dead	Trent	
2022	Renegades	Anthony Goram	
2022	Battle for Saipan	Major William Porter	
2022	As Good as Dead	Piro	
2023	Breakout	Alex Baros	
2023	Adrenaline	John Slater	
2023	Crossfire	Mark Patson	
2023	The Flood	Rafe Calderon	
2023	3 Days in Malay	John Caputo	Also Director
2023	My Big Fat Greek Wedding 3	Nikos "Nick" Portokalos	
2023	Holiday Boyfriend	Blake	
2024	Hellhound	Loreno	
2024	Skeletons in the Closet	Santeros	
2024	Day Labor	Sheriff Jason Paterson	
2024	Discovering Love	Zander Stephanopoulos	TV movie
2024	Operation Blood Hunt	Richter	Also Director
2025	Prisoner of War	—N/a	Director and Producer
2026	Above & Below	TBA	Post-production
2026	Mexicali	Sue	
TBA	Skyline: Warpath	TBA	Completed

=== Television ===
Year	Title	Role	Notes
1990	China Beach	Aussie	Episode: "You, Babe"
1992–1993	Down the Shore	Aldo Carbone	Main Cast
1993–1994	Grace Under Fire	Carl	Recurring Cast: Season 1
1995	Get Smart	Georgio	Episode: "Shoot Up the Charts"
1995–1996	Can't Hurry Love	Roger Carlucci	Main Cast
1997	Nash Bridges	Ray Goetz	Recurring Cast: Season 2, Guest: Season 3
1998–1999	Martial Law	Detective Louis Malone	Main Cast
1999–2001	Relic Hunter	Derek Lloyd	Guest Cast: Season 1–3
2000	Friends	Carl	Episode: "The One with Unagi"
2001	Resurrection Blvd.	Jake Mornay	Recurring Cast: Season 2
2002	Charmed	Nathan Lang	Episode: "Saving Private Leo"
2002	She Spies	Leo Divornak	Episode: "Poster Girl"
2003	Touched by an Angel	Marty	Episode: "And a Nightingale Sang"
2003	My Big Fat Greek Life	Nikos "Nick" Portokalos	Main Cast
2004	CSI: Miami	Steve Riddick	Episode: "Crime Wave"
2009	Rules of Engagement	Nick	Episode: "May Divorce Be with You"
2009	CSI: NY	Detective Christos Temmas	Episode: "Grounds for Deception"
2009	CSI: Miami	Jimmy Burris	Episode: "Bone Voyage"
2010	NCIS: Los Angeles	Lucas Maragos	Episode: "Little Angels"
2012	Castle	Mr. Kazoolie	Episode: "Cloudy with a Chance of Murder"
2014	Days of Our Lives	Ortiz	Episode: "Episode #1.12366" & "#1.12367"
2017	Hand of God	Quintin Brode	Episode: "I See That Now"
2020	Absentia	Meridian Guard	Episode: "Veritas Aequitas"
2022	The Pact	"Rooster"	Recurring Cast
2022	The Offer	Mickey Cohen	Episode: "Warning Shots"
