= Parya =

Parya may refer to:

- Parya language, Indo-Aryan language spoken in Central Asia
- Parya people, an Indo-Aryan speaking people group native to Central Asia
- several mountains in Peru:
  - Parya (Ayacucho)
  - Paria (Peru)
  - Puka Parya
  - Parya Chaka

== See also ==
- Parrya, a genus of plants
- Paria (disambiguation)
