= Paria =

Paria may refer to the following :

== Places and jurisdictions ==
=== Old World ===
- Paria, Gujarat, village in Vapi, Valsad, Gujarat, India
- Paria in Proconsulari, an Ancient city and former bishopric, now a Latin titular see in Tunisia
- Paria, of, from, or related to Paros, a Greek island in the central Aegean Sea

=== Americas ===
- Paria (Peru), a mountain in the Andes
- Paria, Bolivia, founded in 1535, the first Spanish settlement in Bolivia.
- Paria, Utah, or Pahreah, a ghost town on the Paria River in Grand Staircase-Escalante National Monument in Utah, United States
- Paria, a Spanish colonial province of Venezuela, constituting the eastern portion of the country
- Paria Point, a mountain in Zion National Park, Utah
- Paria River, tributary of the Colorado River, United States
- Paria Peninsula, peninsula in Sucre, Venezuela
- Gulf of Paria, gulf on the South of Paria Peninsula, the Orinoco River delta in Venezuela and on west coast of Trinidad
- The name given to North America on the Waldseemüller map.

== Arts, entertainment, and media ==
- Paria (band), an American experimental metal band active from 2001 to 2010
- Paria (opera) by Stanisław Moniuszko, 1869
- Il paria, opera by Donizetti
- Le paria by Casimir Delavigne, basis of both operas

== Other uses ==
- Parias, a form of tribute in medieval Spain
- Paria (beetle), a genus of leaf beetle in family Chrysomelidae
- Paria Fuel Trading Company, an oil company

== See also ==
- Pariah (disambiguation)
- Parya (disambiguation)
- Praia (disambiguation)
