= Praia Grande (disambiguation) =

Praia Grande (Portuguese for "Long Beach") may refer to:

- Praia Grande, Santa Catarina, Brazil
- Praia Grande, São Paulo state, Brazil
- Praia Grande (Ferragudo), a beach in the concelho of Lagoa (Algarve), Portugal
- Praia Grande (Macau), a bay in Macau

== See also ==
- Praia (disambiguation)
