= Dark Crisis =

2022 comic book storyline

- Publisher: DC Comics
- Publication date: April – December 2022
- Genre: Superhero
Title(s)
- Justice League (Vol. 4)
- Justice League Incarnate
- Dark Crisis
- Aquamen
- Dark Crisis: Young Justice
- The Flash (Vol. 1)
- Main character(s): Justice League; Justice Society of America; The Great Darkness; Pariah; Young Justice; Titans; Flash Family; Green Lantern Corps; Legion of Doom; Deathstroke; Dark Army; Secret Society of Super Villains; Mickey Mxyzptlk

Creative team
- Writer: Joshua Williamson
- Penciller: Daniel Sampere

"Dark Crisis on Infinite Earths", originally "Dark Crisis", is a 2022 comic book storyline published by DC Comics, comprising an eponymous central 7 issue mini-series by writer Joshua Williamson and artist Daniel Sampere, and a number of tie-in books. The event received critical acclaim, with critics praising Williamson's writing, inclusion of characters, art, story, and action. The storyline takes place towards the end of Infinite Frontier, with the conclusion of the series leading into the Dawn of DC in 2023.

The title of the series was changed from Dark Crisis to Dark Crisis on Infinite Earths on and after issue #4, which denoted how the series is a direct sequel to Crisis on Infinite Earths. The series results in the return of the DCU's infinite multiverse which was destroyed in the original crisis in 1986.

== Plot ==
=== Prelude ===
Darkseid reveals to his Apokoliptian Elites his knowledge of the Great Darkness, of which he is planning to take control, and his plan to crack the Omniverse. After escaping from Darkseid, Barry Allen runs aimlessly into the ruin of Multiverse-2 where he meets Pariah, who imprisoned him in an alternate reality.

Doctor Multiverse from Earth-8 had not received contact from Machinehead after his negotiation with Darkseid while planning the crack the multiverse. Justice League Incarnate, led by Calvin Ellis, decided to rescue the Flash until they got separated from the Parademon armies attacking their headquarters and confronting other multiversal threats. When Doctor Multiverse touches the crack, she learns a shocking history and convinces the heroes to let Darkseid win.

She reveals to the heroes and Darkseid that the Great Darkness was responsible for causing multiple catastrophic events because of its desire to end all things. During the birth of the multiverse, the Great Darkness declares war against the Light in an attempt to conquer it. The Great Darkness took possession of the Anti-Monitor as its champion while facing off against the Light's champion, the Monitor who summons the heroes to stop Anti-Monitor's goal resulting in the obliteration of the entire multiverse into a single universe which weakens the Light in the process. As the Darkness attempted to regain control, the Swamp Thing successfully brokered a truce with the Light forcing it into deep slumber. The Darkness managed to exert influence over the universe, contributing to the events of Final Crisis and Dark Nights: Death Metal. At one point, the Darkness encountered Doctor Manhattan and manipulated him into altering the timeline, creating The New 52. During Justice League Incarnate's confrontation with the Gentry, the primordial entity Empty Hand was created out of existence as Darkness' right hand caused by its truce with the Light.

Darkseid reveals his first plan to control the Darkness is to declare war on Earth-7 and defeat Empty Hand. As Thomas Wayne attempts to sedate Doctor Multiverse, he is now possessed by the Great Darkness causing Darkseid to kill him and take Doctor Multiverse's energy with him before teleporting to Earth-7. As the heroes try to intervene, the possessed members attack them under the influence of the Empty Hand which Doctor Multiverse frees them. The Empty Hand manages to overpower Darkseid allowing him to activate the Oblivion Machine and lure Darkseid into the dark void. With Orion now the ruler of Apokolips, he decided to destroy the Oblivion Machine while the Justice League Incarnate continues to rescue Barry Allen. The heroes enter the void only to discover that Barry is trapped in the twisted reality. As they tried to convince Barry to leave, he refused. Pariah suddenly appears and tries to persuade them of their desire but Doctor Multiverse knows his deception and forced the team to retreat. As Orion departed to Apokolips, Thunderer summons his powers to destroy the Machine decimating Earth-7 in the process before evacuating with the team. Having failed to rescue Barry and the multiverse in jeopardy, the Justice League Incarnate decides to summon Barry's Justice League for aid. Somewhere in the Void, Pariah revealed to Darkseid that despite the Justice League Incarnate's success in closing the portal, both Multiverse-1 and 2 were weakened allowing the Great Darkness to take control of Darkseid and submit him to its will creating its own Dark Army alongside Ares, Doomsday, Eclipso, Nekron, Neron, Empty Hand, and Upside Down Man.

Black Adam, Batman, Wonder Woman, Hawkgirl, Superman, Zatanna, Aquaman, John Stewart, Martian Manhunter, Black Canary, and Green Arrow are transported into the House of Heroes (headquarters of the Justice League Incarnate) where it is revealed that Calvin Ellis teleported them because Barry Allen is trapped in a twisted reality and the Great Darkness has enslaved Darkseid and killed Spectre. Wonder Woman explains her discussion with The Hands about the cost to the team. Arriving at Multiverse-1 ruins after the attack, The team is encountered by Pariah who is now under the influence of the Darkness. Superman offered Pariah aid to absolve his mistakes but Pariah rejects their help believing that the heroes ruined everything. He claims that he will let the Justice League's world die for the true Multiverse to be reborn. Pariah summons the Dark Army, with Spectre and the Anti-Monitor's shadow demons as their allies, to fight against the Justice League and Justice League Incarnate. During the battle, the Justice League was surprised at how brutal they were and discovered that they were all possessed by the Great Darkness. The battle ends when Green Arrow shoots his arrow to destroy Pariah's machine before being pummeled by Doomsday. Enraged by their interference, Pariah summons his power to erase both the Justice League and Justice League Incarnate from existence. During a battle with Pariah, Black Adam manages to escape and lands in front of the Hall of Justice, saying the Justice League is dead.

Jon Kent meets up with Nightwing and reports to him about the Justice League's death from Black Adam. Nightwing and Jon Kent discuss how heroes that die are usually resurrected, and they decide to team up to honor their mentors' legacy. Wally West, Iris West, Linda Park, and Wallace West discuss Barry's disappearance and Wally promises Iris that he will find him. Wally revisits the Flash Museum honoring heroes' sacrifices before receiving a call from Jon. Hal Jordan learns from Aquaman (Jackson Hyde) about the Leagues' death before escorting the corrupted alien to its home after being cured. Taking place before the Justice League's death, Pariah wanders endlessly in the false reality while facing his guilt until he discovered the reality of multiverse-2 destruction, unaware that the Great Darkness manipulates him into building the machine.

=== Plot ===
Nightwing gives a eulogy to the Justice League in front of the rest of the superhero community and the general public, while Deathstroke and his Secret Society of Super Villains also pay their respects as he blows out the candle. As villains spread chaos across the world out of fear, Hal Jordan joins in after hearing from Jon Kent and Wally West that the Justice League was killed by Pariah according to Black Adam, and does not trust Adam. Wally West tells him that Doctor Fate, Ray Palmer, Ryan Choi, and Captain Cold do not know where the Justice League and Barry Allen are. With Hal Jordan departing for galactic threat and Wally West leaving to find Barry, Jon tries persuading Yara Flor and Jace Fox to join his new Justice League, but they refuse due to them being busy. Jon creates his new Justice League (consisting of Damian Wayne, Supergirl, Doctor Light, Blue Beetle, Booster Gold, Ted Kord, Harley Quinn, Killer Frost, Jackson Hyde, and Frankenstein), to which Adam tells Jon that his Justice League is not ready because some of the members are reformed villains. Deathstroke and his army launch an attack on the Titans Academy, injuring many superheroes and shooting Beast Boy in the head. On Multiverse-2, Pariah reveals his plan to the Great Darkness by using the Justice League's death to incite Earth-0 into deep despair, allowing him to excess his phase of destroying the multiverse.

Nightwing manages to recover from the attack and confronts Deathstroke who reveals that his Secret Society of Super Villains has already targeted Nightwing's closest allies. Deathstroke challenges Nightwing to a fight which Nightwing wins, but Deathstroke offers a second challenger and Nightwing realizes that Deathstroke will kill the person who loses him in a fight. Nightwing offers himself up but is saved by Jon Kent. Deathstroke also sends in Cyborg Superman to take down Jon Kent, but Jon Kent defeats Cyborg Superman. Pariah tells Deathstroke to spare the heroes and orders him to retreat bringing his Secret Society with him, which he relents. Black Adam arrives and announces that he will be training the new Justice League. Kyle Rayner escapes from prison and meets up with Hal Jordan and the Green Lantern Corps, where he learns that Wally West, Kid Flash, Jesse Chambers, Max Mercury, and Wally's kids are trying to find Barry Allen.

As Donna Troy discusses the aftermath of Titans Academy's incident, Deathstroke's Secret Society of Super Villains tries to capture more heroes while the public starts to lose hope that the Justice League will return, forcing other heroes to make difficult choices. Barbara Gordon, Duke Thomas, Jason Todd, Stephanie Brown and Cassandra Cain go visit the Titans tower to make sure Nightwing is okay after the attack while checking on Beast Boy. Black Adam is trying to train the new Justice League and convinces them they must kill their enemies to scare Deathstroke, but they disapprove of his actions believing that killing them will not justify their victory. Damian Wayne confirms that Deathstroke is well aware of their moral views of killing. Yara Flor arrives and stops Adam from killing Count Vertigo in front of the Justice League forcing Adam to leave in humiliation and ask the Legion of Doom for help. Deathstroke reunites with Ravager and persuades her to be her legacy as the Darkness infested his Secret Society to start a crisis. As Jon Kent and Damian Wayne argue about their loss of hope, the Justice Society of America arrives to help the new Justice League. Meanwhile, Hal Jordan and the Green Lantern Corps arrive at Ryut. Hal, Kyle, and Sojourner Mullein teleport toward Multiverse-2, leaving other Green Lanterns to prepare for the upcoming battle. As the three Green Lanterns confront Pariah on Multiverse-2's ruin, Hal discovers the Great Darkness' plan of using the Justice League's death to weaponize them and recreating new pocket dimensions before being disintegrated and transported to the pocket world of John Stewart.

Barry Allen arrives and saves Hal Jordan, revealing that Wally West rescued him from Pariah's mind control and choose to rescue the Justice League after learning about their death and examining their alternate worlds. Barry tells Hal that Pariah is using the Justice League's prisons to harness energy to power a bomb and takes him to Batman's prison. As the Justice League and Justice Society discuss the Great Darkness' threat, Alan Scott manages to persuade Nightwing to lead the new team by stating they need his new leadership since he was the original sidekick who went out of his mentor's shadow. Nightwing, Yara Flor, Alan, and Jon Kent visit the Justice League Dark's headquarters owned by John Constantine, Detective Chimp, and two avatars of Swamp Thing (Alec Holland and Levi Kamei) where they tell the heroes that the Great Darkness is a neutral force and someone is corrupting it. Deathstroke attacks the Legion of Doom's headquarters and a fight breaks out. Lex Luthor manages to disarm Deathstroke, but is attacked by infected Prometheus who manages to take control of the Legion of Doom and attacks Black Adam, with Pariah revealing that he plans to use the energy from the Justice League worlds to create a new Multiverse as he retells its origin.

Black Adam is saved by Sideways, Mister Terrific, Jackson Hyde, and Supergirl from the possessed Legion of Doom, and Mister Terrific realizes that Deathstroke's Secret Society of Super Villains spreads the Great Darkness influence over people, and Jon Kent reveals that Pariah is corrupting the Great Darkness. Damian Wayne tells Doctor Light to follow him as he has a secret plan while Nightwings prepares the Titans to fight against Deathstroke's Secret Society of Super Villains despite Adam's complaint. Flash and Green Lantern manage to free Batman and Wonder Woman from their imprisonment. As they rescue Superman, who is fully aware of his prison world. He reveals to them that he managed to break free of his prison after studying his alternate reality allowing him to absorb the crisis energy. Desperate to recreate the worlds, Pariah discovers that the infinite Earths are unstable and he requires more heroes to stabilize them. Imbued with cosmic powers, Superman manages to free all of the Justice League members, including the revived Green Arrow, as they confront Pariah. Pariah disappears back to Earth-Zero where he attacks the rest of Earth's heroes with Deathstroke's Secret Society and his Dark Army.

The Shadow Demons quickly ambush the Green Lantern Corps as they flush out from the central power battery, while the heroes on Earth are overwhelmed by Pariah's Dark Army. As Pariah laments his desire toward the Great Darkness, Deathstroke is still leading the Secret Society of Super Villains and pleads with Pariah to end this pain. Pariah states Deathstroke will be freed after he succeeded in Darkness' mission before confronting Nightwing and a recovered Beast Boy. Jace Fox arrives to help the heroes on Earth alongside Miss Martian, Blue Beetle, Connor Hawke, Nubia, and Steel. Pariah vaporizes Steel, Ted Kord, Firestorm, Booster Gold, and Connor, which recreates more worlds to allow the Great Darkness to overrun the Multiverse. Yara Flor uses her Lasso of Truth on Pariah long enough for Jace Fox and Mister Terrific to use Pariah's machine on him, killing him in the process. Overpowered by the combined strength of Darkseid, Eclipso, Ares, Nekron, Doomsday, and Neron, Jon Kent is about to accept his fate until he was joined with Superman, along with the Justice League and the Green Lantern Corps, who manages to arrive back home thanks to Hal Jordan and Barry Allen's combination of the Speed Force and the power ring (although Green Arrow is killed once again since he wasn't vaporized by Pariah). The heroes manage to gain the upper hand on the Dark Army. However, the Great Darkness chooses Deathstroke as its final host, causing him to mutate into a Doomsday-like monstrosity. The now-insane Deathstroke prepares to kill Nightwing and Ravager as he declares that he intends not to control the Multiverse, but to destroy it instead.

As the Justice League tries to fight off the mutated Deathstroke, Nightwing and Deathstroke fight in their minds with Deathstroke explaining he wants to destroy the Multiverse to break the cycle of villains rising again and causing everyone to suffer as a result. Damian Wayne brings in the Justice League Incarnate as well as Doctor Light who reveals she is connected to the DC Multiverse just like The Great Darkness. As the Justice League fend off the Great Darkness, Doctor Light combines her power with the Speed Force that The Flash has charged up to repel the Great Darkness from the DC Multiverse becoming more infinite. As Doctor Light and the speedsters successfully healed the multiverse, the Dark Army vanished pulling back from where they came from while the heroes who were erased by Pariah were restored from their deaths. Black Adam gives his powers to the rest of the heroes while weakening Deathstroke but the Great Darkness chooses Nightwing as its new host. Nightwing manages to fight off the Great Darkness influence and knocks out Deathstroke before he could kill Adam, and Ravager convinces Deathstroke to stop. As the rest of the heroes reunited with their family and celebrated their victory for saving the multiverse, Deathstroke loses his Super Soldier serum due to the Great Darkness corrupting him, Spectre reconnected with Jim Corrigan along with the restored quintessences, Darkseid returns to Apokolips regaining his leadership, Dr Light exploring the multiverse under Justice League Incarnate supervision, Canary and Arsenal mourns Oliver Queen's death, and members of the Legion of Doom and the Secret Society escaped from chaos and plot their next schemes. With the Great Darkness laid in rest, the heroes concluded that Pariah was never really corrupted by the Great Darkness but it was all in his head. Pariah was only able to tap into a fraction of the Great Darkness' true power. Barry Allen decided to investigate the multiverse for upcoming threat with Wallace West while Hal Jordan rejoins with the Green Lantern Corps for their mission. Superman and Jon Kent thank Adam for his help, and Adam begrudgingly compliments Jon Kent. While meeting up with Nightwing, Batman announces the Justice League are disbanded because of their experiences and decides that every hero will work together before hearing a call. In the epilogue, Amanda Waller and her Suicide Squad meets up with the Council of Light to try to convince them to eradicate all metahumans. They give Waller the resources needed to deal with the superheroes and supervillains, leading to the events of "Absolute Power".

=== Tie-ins ===
==== Aquamen ====
After Jackson Hyde, Mera, and Garth defeat Black Manta, they hear that the Justice League was killed. Jackson goes to Mera to console her over the death of Arthur Curry.

==== Dark Crisis: Big Bang ====
After the final battle, the restoration of the infinite Multiverse led to the return of the Anti-Monitor. The Anti-Monitor once again attempted to destroy the Multiverse, but was foiled by Barry Allen, Wallace West and a team of Multiversal heroes.

==== Dark Crisis: The Dark Army ====
Damian Wayne leads Sideways, Power Girl, Doctor Light, and Red Canary to Earth 53 to find a way to prevent The Great Darkness from taking over more heroes and Earths. There they realize that the Great Darkness is trying to infect the orrery of worlds. They then travel to the House of Heroes where they are then ambushed by Justice League Incarnate, who are now possessed by the Great Darkness. Doctor Light learns that her powers are connected to the source and frees Justice League Incarnate, as well as preventing the Great Darkness infecting the orrery of worlds, but Doctor Light frees them thanks to her powers, and they head back to their homeworld.

==== Dark Crisis: War Zone ====
Linda Park helps save Iris West while revealing she has super-speed, and together they hold off some villains until the Justice League arrives. Meanwhile, Jim Corrigan who has been separated from the Spectre, with the help of Raven, manages to subdue Spectre long enough to merge back together in order to remove the influence of the Great Darkness. Nubia has a vision where Deathstroke and his army will cause Dark Crisis in Themyscira. When the Justice League arrive on Earth, the Green Lanterns manage to repel the Great Darkness. During the battle, Damian Wayne belittles Red Canary. But with the help of Black Canary, Cassandra Cain and Stephanie Brown, Red Canary regains her confidence and helps defeat some villains.

==== The Flash ====
Mister Terrific asks Wally West, Wallace West, Jay Garrick, Jesse Chambers, and Max Mercury to help save Barry Allen by going into the Speed Force and finding Barry's vibrations. Linda Park meets up with Wally and is about to tell him that she has powers when their children Irey and Jai West go into the Speed Force portal that Mister Terrific opened. Irey and Jai West, as well as Max and Jesse land on two different worlds while Wally and Wallace West land on Barry's prison world. Max and Jesse land on an Earth where Barry is not a speedster and is in an apocalyptic world while Irey and Jai West land on an Earth where they escape from a speedster Night-Flash (an amalgamation of Batman and Flash). Wally tries talking to Barry Allen, but Barry sees Eobard Thawne instead due to the prison world and nearly kills him.

Linda Park manages to persuade Mister Terrific to let her go in the Speed Force after waiting for a long time and punches Barry before he could kill Wally. Wallace West is nearly tricked to stay in the Prison World but snaps out of it. Jay Garrick arrives to take Irey and Jai West home, and all the speedsters rendezvous at Barry's prison world, with Barry realizing that the Justice League are alive and they're trapped in prison worlds like he was when he encountered Pariah. The rest of the speedsters return to Earth while Barry Allen goes out to try to free the rest of the Justice League before rejoining them.

==== Young Justice ====
Tim Drake, Arrowette, Cassie Sandsmark, Bart Allen, and Conner Kent set up statues after Nightwing's speech in Dark Crisis #1. While talking in a table, Tim, Conner, and Bart are suddenly transported into different worlds; Tim sees Alfred Pennyworth again, Conner sees Dubbilex, and Bart meets up with Max Mercury. Cassie tries asking Wally West, Nightwing, and Jon Kent but they do not know where they are. The trio meet up with each other on Happy Harbor (first headquarters of the Justice League) where they are confronted by the villainess Mighty Endowed. However, an alternate version of Cassie saves them.

Cassie manages to convince Arrowette to help her, and they track down Red Volcano and Red Tornado. Conner, Tim, Bart, and alternate Cassie go to Metropolis to fight Tora where they realize something's not right with this world. They go to the Justice League headquarters where they debate whether they should stay in the prison world. When they go back to Happy Harbor, they see Lex Luthor, Deathstroke, and Captain Boomerang.

==== I Am Batman ====
Sinestro, under orders of Pariah and Deathstroke, tries to torture Jace Fox (the new Batman) and have Jace get the Yellow Lantern ring. This fails when Jace Fox sees through Sinestro's illusions, and decides to go help the Justice League fight against Pariah's Great darkness enemy.

==== Superman: Kal-El Returns Special ====
After defeating Mongul, Superman returns to Earth where he reunites with his family and friends. After talking to Lois, Superman heads to the Hall of Justice where he meets with Naomi McDuffie, Wally West, and Martian Manhunter. As they bond and talk about their recent adventures, Superman is transported to the Justice League Incarnate to help them deal with Pariah and his dark army. This issue sets up Superman's prior actions before Justice League #75: the death of the Justice League.

=== Dark Crisis: Worlds Without a Justice League ===
Following the events of Justice League #75 and the supposed deaths of the League, they are not dead but instead trapped in dream universes by Pariah, in order to power his machine. In these universes the rest of the Justice League does not exist, just the titular character and their supporting cast. These dream universes are meant to show the Justice League their perfect lives. This happiness powers Pariah's machine, which helps him and his Dark Army exert influence and power in the main DC multiverse.

==== Superman ====
Superman is trapped in a world where he has to deal with his son Jon Kent growing up and being independent.

==== Wonder Woman ====
Wonder Woman is trapped in a world where Etta Candy is president of the United States and Artemis of Bana-Mighdall did not murder her mother, Queen Hippolyta. She encounters Doctor Psycho who is held captive by the Amazons.

==== Batman ====
Batman is trapped in a world where his Bruce Wayne persona is separated by Alfred because Alfred wants Bruce and Batman to be happy. Meanwhile, Zatanna is trapped in a world, but is freed by Zatara, John Constantine, Aquaman, Batman, Superman, Flash, Hal Jordan, and Wonder Woman.

==== Green Lantern ====
John Stewart is transported to a world where John helps fight off an enemy called The Radiant Dead who killed Guardians of the Universe. Meanwhile, Kendra Saunders is trying to enter the Temple of Life to break her reincarnation cycle to be her own person.

==== Green Arrow ====
Green Arrow is in a world where he is Robin Hood alongside Connor Hawke, Roy Harper, and Mia Dearden trying to fight Merlyn, who is the Sheriff of Nottingham. Green Arrow is attacked by Black Canary, but they stop fighting in order to get to know each other. While at a club, they are attacked by an alternate version of Oliver Queen who never left the island, but Black Canary saves Green Arrow and they kiss, revealing that no matter what world they are in, they will always be soulmates.

== Issues involved ==
=== Prelude issues ===
Title	Issues	Writer(s)	Artist(s)	Colorist	Debut date	Conclusion date
Infinite Frontier	0–6	Joshua Williamson	Xermanico; Paul Pelletier; Jesús Merino; Tom Derenick	Romulo Fajardo Jr. Hi-Fi	March 2, 2021	September 7, 2021
Justice League Incarnate	1–5	Joshua Williamson; Denis Culver	Andrei Bressan; Brandon Peterson; Tom Derenick; Kyle Hotz; Paul Pelletier; Ariel Olivetti; Nicole Virella; Todd Nauck; Mikel Janin; Chris Burnham; Mike Norton; Jesús Merino	Hi-Fi	November 30, 2021	March 1, 2022
Justice League (vol. 4)	75	Joshua Williamson	Rafa Sandoval	Matt Herms	April 19, 2022	
Free Comic Book Day 2022: Dark Crisis - Special Edition	0	Joshua Williamson	Jim Cheung	Alejandro Sánchez	May 7, 2022	
Justice League: Road to Dark Crisis	1	Joshua Williamson; Jeremy Adams; Chuck Brown; Phillip Kennedy Johnson; Stephanie Phillips	Dan Jurgens; Rosi Kampe; Fico Ossio; Leila Del Duca; Clayton Henry	Hi-Fi; Matt Herms; Sebastian Cheng; Jordie Bellaire; Marcelo Maiolo	May 31, 2022	

=== Main series ===
Title	Issues	Writer(s)	Artist(s)	Colorist	Debut date	Conclusion date
Dark Crisis on Infinite Earths	1–7	Joshua Williamson	Daniel Sampere	Alejandro Sánchez	June 7, 2022	December 20, 2022

=== Tie-in issues ===
Title	Issues	Writer(s)	Artist(s)	Colorist	Debut date	Conclusion date
Aquamen	6	Chuck Brown; Brandon Thomas	Sami Basri	Adriano Lucas	July 26, 2022	
Dark Crisis: Big Bang	1	Mark Waid	Dan Jurgens	Federico Blee	December 13, 2022	
Dark Crisis: The Dark Army	1	Mark Waid; Dennis Culver; Delilah S. Dawson	Freddie Williams II	TBA	November 22, 2022	
Dark Crisis: The Deadly Green	1	Alex Paknadel; Dan Watters; Ram V	Daniel Bayliss Tom Derenick Brent Peeples George Kambadais	Matt Herms	October 4, 2022	
Dark Crisis: War Zone	1	Frank Tieri; Matthew Rosenberg; Delilah S. Dawson; Jeremy Adams; Stephanie Williams	Matt Ryan; Fernando Pasarin; Daniel Bayliss; George Kambadais; Serg Acuña	TBA	December 6, 2022	
Dark Crisis: Worlds Without a Justice League – Batman	1	Si Spurrier; Meghan Fitzmartin	Ryan Sook; Dan Jurgens; Norm Rapmund	Federico Blee	November 15, 2022	
Dark Crisis: Worlds Without a Justice League – Green Arrow	1	Dennis Culver; Stephanie Phillips	Clayton Henry; Nicole Virella	Romulo Fajardo Jr. Marcelo Maiolo	October 11, 2022	
Dark Crisis: Worlds Without a Justice League – Green Lantern	1	Phillip Kennedy Johnson; Jeremy Adams	Fernando Blanco; Jackson Herbert	Jordie Bellaire; Alex Guimarães	August 9, 2022	
Dark Crisis: Worlds Without a Justice League – Superman	1	Tom King	Chris Burnham	Adriano Lucas	July 12, 2022	
Dark Crisis: Worlds Without a Justice League – Wonder Woman	1	Tini Howard; Dan Watters	Leila Del Duca; Brandon Peterson	Jordie Bellaire; Michael Atiyeh	September 13, 2022	
Dark Crisis: Young Justice	1–6	Meghan Fitzmartin	Laura Braga	Luis Guerrero	June 21, 2022	November 15, 2022
The Flash	783–786	Jeremy Adams	Amancay Nahuelpan	Jeromy Cox	June 21, 2022	September 20, 2022
I Am Batman	15	John Ridley	Karl Mostert	Romulo Fajardo Jr.	November 8, 2022	
Superman: Kal-El Returns Special	1	Mark Waid; Sina Grace; Marv Wolfman; Alex Segura	Clayton Henry; Dean Haspiel; Jackson Herbert; Max Ray-nor	Marcelo Maiolo; Trish Mulvihill; Lee Loughridge; Alex Guimarães	November 29, 2022	

== Collected issues ==
Title	Material collected	Published date	ISBN
Justice League Incarnate	Justice League Incarnate #1-5	October 25, 2022	978-1779517951

== Critical reception ==
According to Comic Book Roundup, Dark Crisis has a score of 8.1 out of 10 based on 131 reviews. The series as a whole has an average rating of 3.91 out of 5 based on 1,461 readers of the League of Comic Geeks.
