= Pariah =

Pariah may refer to:

- A member of the Paraiyar caste in the Indian state of Tamil Nadu
  - an untouchable or outcaste more generally
  - an outcast (person)
- Pariah state, a country whose behavior does not conform to norms

== Science and mathematics ==
- Pariah dog, a type of semi-feral dog
- Pariah (fish), a genus of fish
- Pariah group, the six ( J_{1}, J_{3}, J_{4}, O'N, Ru, Ly) of the 26 sporadic mathematical groups that are not contained in the monster group

== Music ==
- Pariah (album), 2005 album by the black metal band Naglfar
- Pariah, post-1987 name of the heavy metal band Satan
- "Pariah" by Black Sabbath, bonus track on the 2013 album 13
- "Pariah" by Danielle Dax, from the 1984 album Jesus Egg That Wept
- "Pariah" by Lamb of God, from the 2000 album New American Gospel
- "Pariah" by dredg, title track of the 2009 album The Pariah, the Parrot, the Delusion
- "Pariah" by Scar Symmetry, bonus track on the 2009 album Dark Matter Dimensions
- "Pariah" by Bullet For my Valentine from the 2015 album Venom
- "Pariah" by Ball Park Music from the 2016 album Every Night the Same Dream
- "Pariah" by Steven Wilson from the 2017 album To The Bone
- "Pariahs" by Sylosis, from the 2023 album A Sign of Things to Come
- Pariah (band), a Texan heavy metal band in the late 1980s and early 1990s

== Other media ==
- Pariah (1998 film), a film by Randolph Kret
- Pariah (2011 film), a film by Dee Rees
- Pariah (2015 film), a film by Rob McElhenney
- Pariah (2024 film), a film by Tathagata Mukherjee
- Pariah (character), DC Comics character
- Pariah (novel), a 1991 crime novel by Brian Vallée
- Pariah (play), an 1889 one-act play by August Strindberg
- Pariah (video game), a 2005 video game for PC and Xbox

== See also ==
- Paria (disambiguation)
