= Parya language =

Indo-Aryan language spoken in Central Asia

Parya
- Парйа پاریا
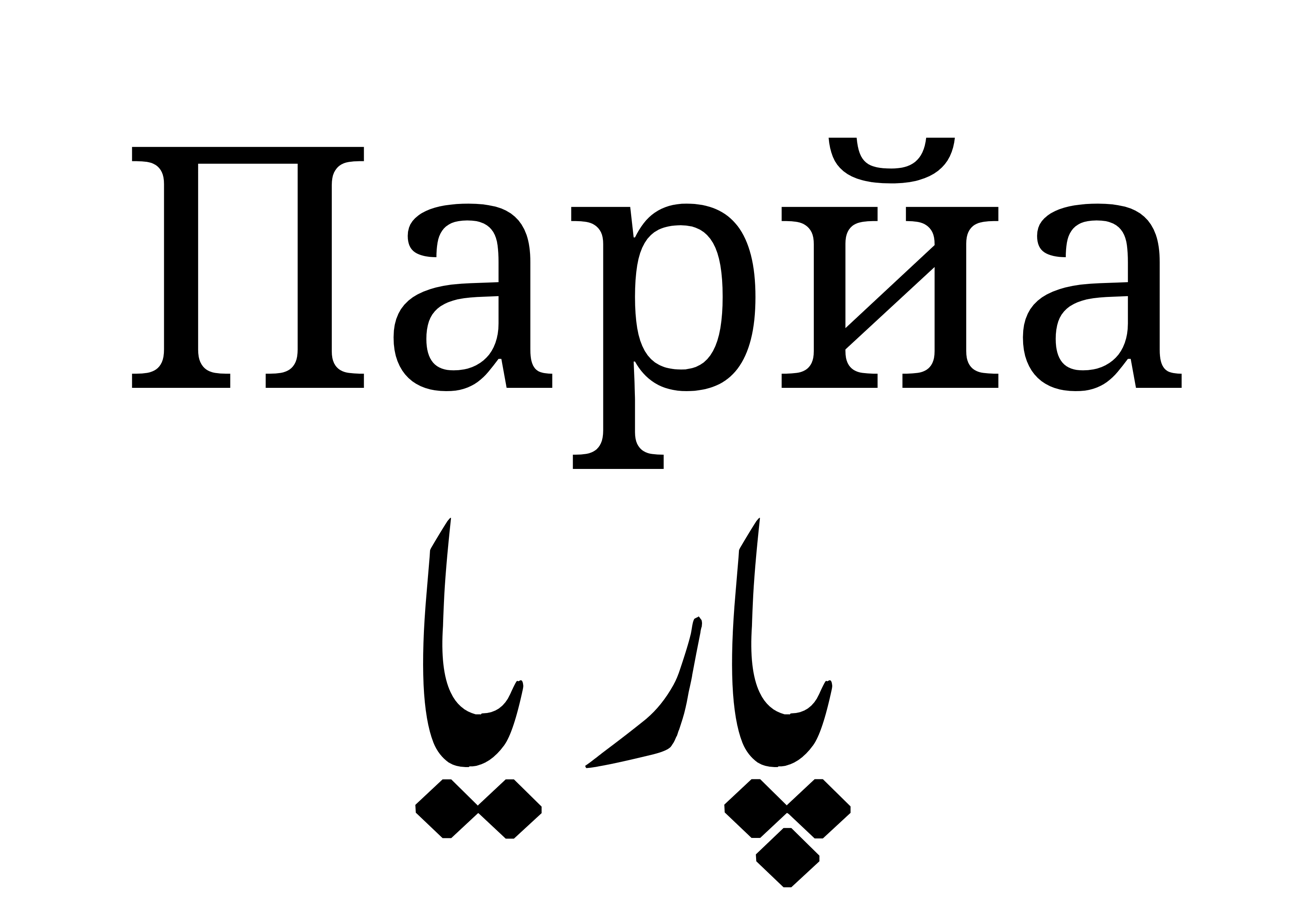
- Native to: Tajikistan, Uzbekistan, Afghanistan
- Region: Gissar Valley, Surkhandarya basin
- Ethnicity: Parya
- Native speakers: 2,600 (2008–2017); Tajikistan: 1,600 (2017); Uzbekistan: 1,000 (2008); Afghanistan: Extinct (no date)
- Language family: Indo-European: Indo-Iranian; Indo-Aryan; Central Zone; Parya
- Writing system: Cyrillic, Latin, Arabo-Persian (Nastaliq)

Official status
- Official language in: Tajikistan (in Gorno-Badakhshan)

Language codes
- ISO 639-3: paq
- Glottolog: pary1242
- ELP: Parya
- Parya is classified as Severely Endangered by the UNESCO Atlas of the World's Languages in Danger

Parya (Parya: Парйа/پاریا) is an isolated Central Indo-Aryan language spoken in the border region between Tajikistan and Uzbekistan. There are several thousand speakers worldwide.

== Classification and status ==
Parya is classified as a Central Zone language in the Indo-Aryan language family.

Tajuzbeki (or Tadj-Uzbeki) was an alternative name coined by Bholanath Tiwari for the same language. Much of the academic research in documenting and characterizing Parya was done by prominent Soviet linguist I. M. Oranski. The language may also be referred to as Afgana-Yi Nasfurush, Afghana-Yi Siyarui, Changgars, Laghmani, or Pbharya.

SIL estimates that there may be between 2,500 and 7,500 speakers.

The language is not officially recognized or used in schools and is categorized as severely endangered.

== Speakers of Parya ==
Parya is spoken in the Hissor Valley of Tajikistan, west of Dushanbe, and the adjacent Surkhondaryo basin of Uzbekistan, including the towns of Hisor, Shahrinav, Regar/Tursunzoda, Surchi, Afghonobod, Qalai Hisor, Pravda Vostok, Boloi Kanal, and Kolkhozi Leninism.

The language is mostly spoken with one's family and relations, and it is almost always spoken in the homes of native speakers.

Parya speakers tend to be bilingual in the dominant languages surrounding them, but tend to exclusively use Parya at home.

The Tajik language has increasingly influenced the Parya language.

== Phonology ==
Consonants
		Labial	Dental	Alveolar	Postalveolar/ Palatal	Retroflex	Velar	Uvular	Glottal
Nasal		m	n̪		ɲ	ɳ	ŋ		
Stop/ Affricate	aspirated	pʰ	t̪ʰ		t͡ʃʰ	ʈʰ	kʰ		
Stop/ Affricate	voiceless	p	t̪		t͡ʃ	ʈ	k	q	
Stop/ Affricate	voiced	b	d̪		d͡ʒ	ɖ	ɡ		
Fricative	voiceless	f		s	ʃ		x		
Fricative	voiced	v		z			ɣ		
Flap				ɾ		ɽ			
Approximant				l	j				ɦ

== Grammar ==
=== Vigesimal counting ===
Parya employs some vigesimal numeral counting patterns.

English	Parya	Hindi	Cognate Hindi words
one	yek	ek	
two	du	do	
three	tin	tīn	
four	char	cār	
five	panj	pāñc	
ten	dus	das	
twenty	bis	bīs	
seventy	sare tin bisi	sattar	sāṛhe tīn = three and a half; bīs = twenty
ninety	sare char bisi	nabbe	sāṛhe cār = four and a half; bīs = twenty
