= Parrya nauruaq =

Scientific classification
- Kingdom: Plantae
- Clade: Tracheophytes
- Clade: Angiosperms
- Clade: Eudicots
- Clade: Rosids
- Order: Brassicales
- Family: Brassicaceae
- Genus: Parrya
- Species: P. nauruaq

Binomial name
- Parrya nauruaq Al-Shehbaz, J.R.Grant, R.Lipkin, D.F.Murray & C.L.Parker

Species of plant

Parrya nauruaq is a species of flowering plant in the family Brassicaceae that is native to southern Alaska. A subshrub, it grows on gravelly plains and slopes that support little other vegetation.
