= Parya people =

Indo-Aryan ethnolinguistic group

Parya
Парйа; پاریا

Total population
- ~6,800

Regions with significant populations
- Tajikistan: ~5,100
- Uzbekistan: ~1,300
- Afghanistan: ~400
- Russia: Unknown
- Pakistan: Unknown

Languages
- Parya (Native); Tajik, Uzbek, Pashto, Persian

Religion
- Sunni Islam

Related ethnic groups
- Other Indo-Aryan peoples

The Parya, also known as Parja or Laghmani are a small Indo-Aryan ethnolinguistic community in Central Asia, found chiefly in parts of western Tajikistan and southern Uzbekistan with historical links to eastern Afghanistan. They speak the Parya language (ISO 639-3: paq), an Indo-Aryan tongue of the Central Zone, and maintain distinct local identity while showing extensive bilingualism and cultural contact with surrounding Tajik and Uzbek populations.

== Names and identity ==
The group is variously referred to as Parya, Parja or Laghmani (after Laghman in Afghanistan). Community members may also use local or regional exonyms; in some sources the people are described as socially integrated with nearby Tajik villages while retaining Parya for home and intra-community use.

== Distribution ==
Parya settlements are scattered along the Hisor (Gissar) Valley in western Tajikistan and continue into the upper Surkhandarya basin of Uzbekistan. Historical sources and fieldwork also report past Parya presence in parts of eastern Afghanistan (Laghman and nearby areas), though Afghan communities have declined or assimilated in the 20th century. Modern speaker and population estimates are small (low thousands) and vary by source.

== Language ==
=== Classification ===
Parya belongs to the Indo-Aryan branch of the Indo-European family, placed in the Central subgroup by several classifications; however its long isolation and heavy contact with Iranic and Turkic languages have produced significant divergence from South Asian varieties. Linguistic databases list Parya under the code paq and provide basic demographic and classification data.

=== Speakers ===
The Parya people speak the Parya language, an Indo-aryan language native to Central Asia.

=== Status ===
Field research identifies Parya as a minority home language with varying degrees of intergenerational transmission. Many Parya speakers are bilingual in Tajik or Uzbek; younger generations increasingly use the regional dominant languages in public domains. Language vitality assessments describe Parya as vulnerable and emphasise the need for documentation and community language maintenance.

=== Language documentation and maintenance ===
The principal published sociolinguistic and descriptive work on the group is a field study and chapter collected by SIL researchers, which analyses language use across domains and documents maintenance challenges. That research, together with regional multilingualism studies, forms the basis for most current understanding of Parya sociolinguistics and is frequently cited by language databases and reference projects. Scholars emphasise community-based documentation and school/community programs as key strategies to support Parya transmission.

== Origins and history ==
Linguistic and ethnographic findings suggest the Parya community likely traces origins to peoples south of the Amu Darya and Hindu Kush region and moved northwards into the Hisor/Surkhandarya area during the late 19th century. Oral histories and some ethnographic accounts place an 1880s migration from Laghman or Uttar Pradesh of India as a key episode in the community's formation in Central Asia. Over the 20th century the Parya experienced cultural and linguistic assimilation pressures associated with Soviet-era settlement, schooling in Tajik/Russian and contact with Uzbek communities.

== Culture ==
Traditional Parya livelihoods have been agrarian and village-based, emphasising irrigation agriculture and horticulture in valley environments. Cultural life blends Indo-Aryan elements with Central Asian practices visible in dress, music, and village customs. Intermarriage with neighbouring Tajik and Uzbek families is reported in ethnographic sources, and many Parya households are strongly multilingual.

== Religion ==
Most contemporary Parya identify as Sunni Muslim, some are Shia Muslim and participate in the same communal religious practices common in Tajik and Uzbek rural areas. Local folk beliefs and customary practices have also been noted in field reports.

== See also ==
- Parya language
- Indo-Aryan languages
- Central Indo-Aryan languages
- Indo-Aryan peoples
