= Iosef Mikhailovich Oranski =

Soviet linguist

Iosef Mikhailovich Oranski (24 April 1923 – 16 May 1977), sometimes spelled Iosef Mikhailovich Oranskii, was a prominent Soviet linguist affiliated with the Leningrad Institute of Oriental Studies. His work on Iranian languages, as well as on Turkic and Indo-Aryan languages relating to Central Asia, are considered seminal.
