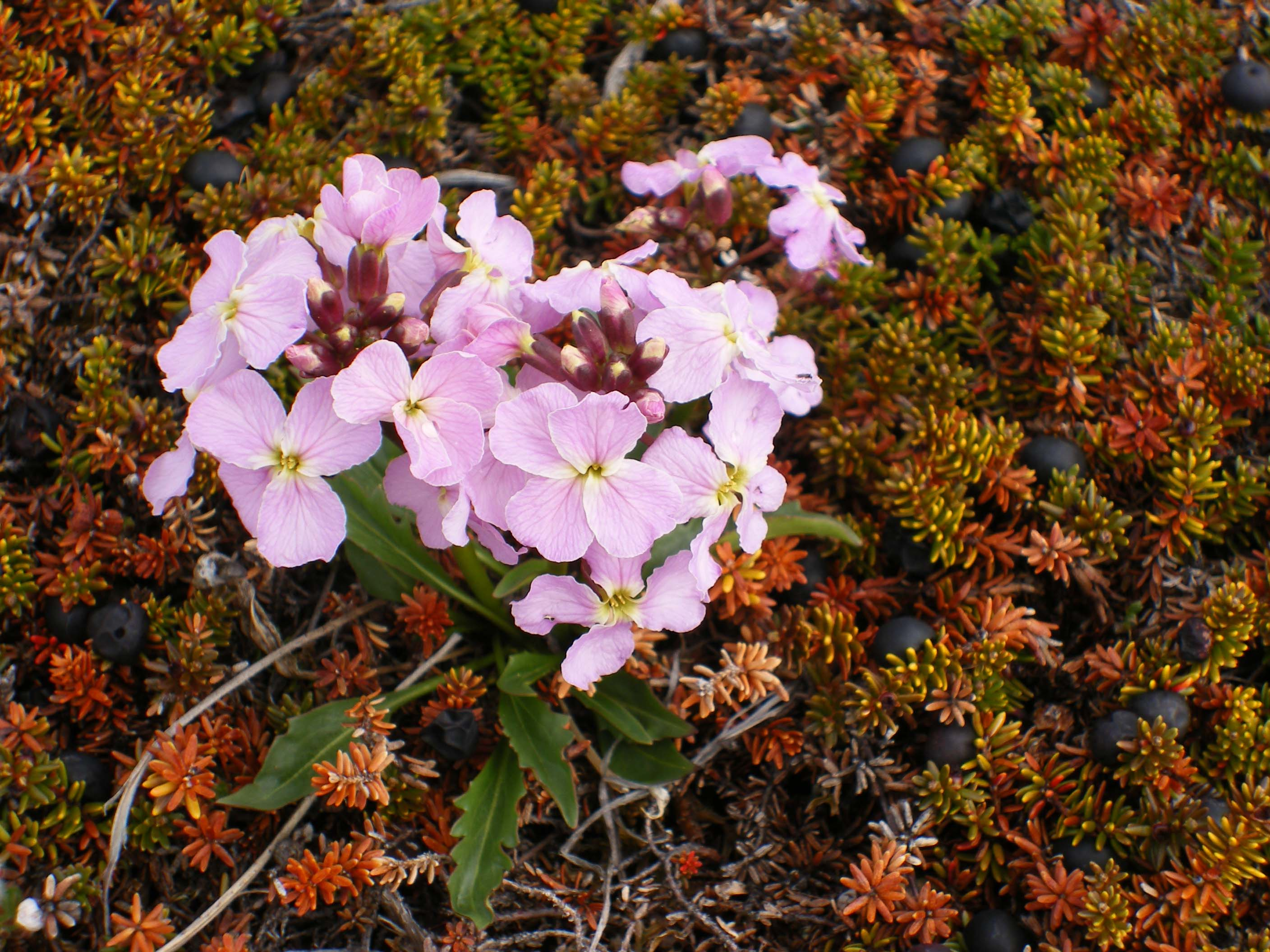
- Parrya nudicaulis growing in a bed of Empetrum nigrum

Scientific classification
- Kingdom: Plantae
- Clade: Tracheophytes
- Clade: Angiosperms
- Clade: Eudicots
- Clade: Rosids
- Order: Brassicales
- Family: Brassicaceae
- Tribe: Chorisporeae
- Genus: Parrya; R.Br.

Species
- See text

Synonyms
- Achoriphragma Soják; Neuroloma Andrz. ex DC.; Pseudoclausia Popov

= Parrya =

Genus of plants in the cabbage family

Parrya is a genus of flowering plants in the family Brassicaceae, found in the arctic and subarctic biomes of the Northern Hemisphere, and in Central Asia. The center of diversity is the Tian Shan and Pamir-Alay mountain ranges.

== Species ==
The following species are accepted:

- Parrya alba Nikitina
- Parrya albida Popov
- Parrya arctica R.Br.
- Parrya asperrima (B.Fedtsch.) Popov
- Parrya australis Pavlov
- Parrya darvazica Botsch. & Vved.
- Parrya fruticulosa Regel & Schmalh.
- Parrya glabra (Royle) D.A.German & Al-Shehbaz
- Parrya gracillima (Popov ex Botsch. & Vved.) D.A.German & Al-Shehbaz
- Parrya hispida (Regel) D.A.German & Al-Shehbaz
- Parrya junussovii D.A.German & Al-Shehbaz
- Parrya khorasanica (Rech.f. & Aellen) D.A.German
- Parrya kuramensis Botsch.
- Parrya lancifolia Popov
- Parrya longicarpa Krasn.
- Parrya maidantalica Popov & P.A.Baranov
- Parrya minjanensis Rech.f.
- Parrya mollissima (Lipsky) D.A.German & Al-Shehbaz
- Parrya nauruaq Al-Shehbaz, J.R.Grant, R.Lipkin, D.F.Murray & C.L.Parker
- Parrya nudicaulis (L.) Regel
- Parrya nuratensis Botsch. & Vved.
- Parrya olgae (Regel & Schmalh.) D.A.German & Al-Shehbaz
- Parrya papillosa (Vassilcz.) D.A.German & Al-Shehbaz
- Parrya pavlovii A.N.Vassiljeva
- Parrya pazijae (Pachom.) D.A.German & Al-Shehbaz
- Parrya pinnatifida Kar. & Kir.
- Parrya pjataevae (Pachom.) D.A.German & Al-Shehbaz
- Parrya podlechii (F.Dvořák) D.A.German & Al-Shehbaz
- Parrya popovii Botsch.
- Parrya pulvinata Popov
- Parrya runcinata (Regel & Schmalh.) N.Busch
- Parrya rydbergii Botsch.
- Parrya sarawschanica (Regel & Schmalh.) D.A.German & Al-Shehbaz
- Parrya saurica (Pachom.) D.A.German & Al-Shehbaz
- Parrya saxifraga Botsch. & Vved.
- Parrya schugnana Lipsch.
- Parrya stenocarpa Kar. & Kir.
- Parrya subsiliquosa Popov
- Parrya tschimganica (Popov ex Botsch. & Vved.) D.A.German & Al-Shehbaz
- Parrya turkestanica (Korsh.) N.Busch
- Parrya vvedenskyi (Pachom.) D.A.German & Al-Shehbaz
