= Pariah (character) =

Character published by DC Comics

- Pariah as depicted in Crisis on Infinite Earths: Absolute Edition #1 (November 2005). Art by George Pérez.

Publication information
- Publisher: DC Comics
- First appearance: Crisis on Infinite Earths #1 (April 1985)
- Created by: Marv Wolfman (writer); George Pérez (artist)

In-story information
- Alter ego: Kell Mossa
- Species: Human
- Team affiliations: Black Lantern Corps; Dark Army
- Abilities: Genius-level intellect; Brilliant scientist; Invulnerability; Immortality; Teleportation; Flight

Pariah (Kell Mossa) is a character in stories published by DC Comics. He is a cosmologist who first appeared as a pivotal character during the Crisis on Infinite Earths storyline. During the events of Crisis on Infinite Earths, Mossa inadvertently made the Anti-Monitor aware of his universe, leading his universe to be destroyed. Mossa survived the destruction of his universe after being saved by the Monitor and was forced to teleport across the multiverse, with his warnings of impending destruction being ignored. As Pariah, Mossa later appeared in the series Villains United, where he was killed by Alexander Luthor Jr. Pariah returned in the 2022 storyline Dark Crisis, where he served as an antagonist under the control of the Great Darkness.

== Publication history ==
Pariah first appeared in Crisis on Infinite Earths #1 (April 1985), and was created by writer Marv Wolfman and artist George Pérez.

== Fictional biography ==
Kell Mossa is an esteemed scientist from an unidentified alternate universe. His attempts to view the creation of the universe result in the Anti-Monitor learning of his universe's existence and destroying it with waves of antimatter. Mossa survives through the intervention of the Monitor and acquires the ability to travel between universes, forced to witness the Anti-Monitor destroy them. Pariah blames himself for his universe's destruction and the Anti-Monitor's release until he finally learns he is not to blame.

An alliance of heroes brought together by the Monitor manages to stop the Anti-Monitor, but most of the multiverse is destroyed, with the remaining five universes being merged into a singular universe. Pariah, Lady Quark, and Harbinger embark to explore the universe.

Many years later, Pariah attempts to warn Lex Luthor that a dangerous predator is coming; "Lex" is actually Alexander Luthor Jr. of Earth-Three in disguise to create a new Secret Society of Super Villains. Pariah is subsequently murdered by Alexander in the Villains United mini-series.

During the Blackest Night event, Pariah's corpse is reanimated by a black power ring and recruited to the Black Lantern Corps. He interrupts a cadre of mystical heroes gathered to investigate the strange occurrences of the event.

Pariah is resurrected in The New 52 continuity reboot, where he makes a minor appearance as a prisoner of A.R.G.U.S.

In Infinite Frontier, it is revealed that Pariah was resurrected due to the Flash creating Flashpoint, during which Pariah fell through a crack in the multiverse. He was held prisoner by the Empty Hand and the Gentry, who forced him to watch as they destroyed universes.

Due to the cycle of destruction and rebirth, Pariah decided that he would create perfect worlds for everyone. He makes a deal with the Great Darkness and becomes its "voice", gaining immense cosmic power. Driven mad by the corrupting influence of the Great Darkness, Pariah is eventually defeated and disintegrated by his own antimatter cannon. He disappears into another dimension, which resembles his home universe prior to its destruction.

== Powers and abilities ==
Pariah is seemingly indestructible and immortal after discovering the multiverse's origin. During Crisis on Infinite Earths, he survived a catastrophic antimatter disaster caused by the Anti-Monitor. Granted by the Monitor, he can teleport to other multiverses, which serve as his focal point. He possesses superhuman physical abilities and flight. Using the Great Darkness, he can create pocket dimensions and erase others from existence. During his fight with Black Adam, Pariah demonstrated a degree of invulnerability.

== In other media ==
- An original incarnation of Pariah, Nash Wells, appears in the Arrowverse crossover "Crisis on Infinite Earths" (2019), portrayed by Tom Cavanagh.
- An original incarnation of Pariah, John Constantine, appears in the Tomorrowverse films Green Lantern: Beware My Power and Justice League: Crisis on Infinite Earths, voiced by Nolan North.
