= Paria, Gujarat =

Paria
- village
- Location within Gujarat Location within India
- Coordinates: 20°26′40″N 72°58′06″E
- Country: India
- State: Gujarat
- District: Valsad

Population
  - Total: about 8,869

Languages
  - Official: Gujarati, Hindi
- Time zone: UTC+5:30 (IST)
- PIN: 396145
- Telephone code: 0260
- Vehicle registration: GJ-
- Nearest city: Vapi
- Lok Sabha constituency: Valsad
- Climate: Hot and humid (Köppen)
- Website: gujaratindia.com

Paria is a village near Vapi in Valsad district, Gujarat, India.
