= Praia (disambiguation) =

Praia means "beach" in Portuguese. It may refer to:

== Places ==
- Cape Verde:
  - Praia, the capital city of Cape Verde
  - Praia (municipality), the municipality where the above city is located
- Azores, Portugal:
  - Praia (Santa Cruz da Graciosa), a parish in the district of Santa Cruz da Graciosa
  - Praia do Almoxarife, a parish in the district of Horta
  - Praia do Norte, a parish in the district of Horta
  - Praia da Vitória, a parish and a district in the island of Terceira
- Brazil:
  - Praia Grande, a municipality in the state of São Paulo
- Italy:
  - Praia a Mare, a municipality of the Province of Cosenza

== Other ==
- Praia (genus) is a genus of sawflies in the family of Cimbicidae
