= Warworld Saga =

Superman crossover story arc

- Publisher: DC Comics
- Publication date: March 2021 – August 2022
- Genre: Superhero
Title(s)
Superman (vol.5) #29-32
Action Comics (vol. 1) #1029-1046
Superman: Warworld Apocalypse #1
Superman and the Authority #1-4
- Main character(s): Superman; Mongul; Apollo; Midnighter; Enchantress; Manchester Black

Creative team
- Writer(s): Phillip Kennedy Johnson; Grant Morrison
- Artist(s): Sami Basri; Adriana Melo; Miguel Mendonca
- Penciller: Ricardo Federici
- Editor(s): Mike Cotton; Marie Javins

"Warworld Saga" is a Superman crossover story arc published by DC Comics in March 2021. The series is written by Phillip Kennedy Johnson with artwork by Sami Basri, Adriana Melo, Miguel Mendoca, and Ricardo Federici. Grant Morrison wrote a prelude limited series called Superman and the Authority that set up the events of the Warworld Saga.

Teased in Future State, the story arc is told in Action Comics and Superman. The event was received with critical acclaim, with critics calling it the best Action Comics event of all time, and praising Philip Kennedy Johnson's world-building, the art, action, and characters.

== Publication history ==
The story arc has been teased in Future State: Superman Worlds at War where Superman is captured by Mongul and is forced to be in a gladiator match. The Superman line of books also had been developing several plot threads involving Superman's supporting characters: Action Comics #1029-1036 focuses on Superman learning the truth about Mongul; Superman and the Authority focused on Superman trying to assemble a team to confront Warworld; and Superman: Son of Kal-El #3 focused on Superman's relationship with his son.

== Plot ==
=== Prelude ===
In an alternate timeline, Superman is captured by Mongul and is forced to participate in a gladiator match for near eternity until he is killed. In the present, Superman and his son Jon Kent deal with enemies who enter a portal, where Jon explains that he is not ready to be the next Superman, and soon Superman will disappear where he is killed. Superman and Jon meet up with aliens whom Superman used to know, and after they deal with the problem, Superman deems Jon worthy of carrying the mantle of Superman. When on another adventure and Superman deals with an alien problem with Jon still not ready to be Superman, it is revealed that Mongul is dying and has a secret son.

A mysterious stranger goes to Mongul and brings him the severed heads of his other sons, which Mongul congratulates as there will be no more challengers left to confront his throne. Superman does a test for Batman and Ray Palmer where they tell Superman after his previous encounters with the aliens, there is cellular decay due to radiation poisoning due to the portal. Jon talks to Damian Wayne about how in the future, Superman disappears after he dealt with the breach and is afraid that his father will die. Damian consoles Jon and tells him that Jon will succeed as the next Superman. Superman meets with Lois Lane when he gets a report of an alien ship, and is shocked to see Kryptonian offshoots known as Phaelosians. Superman takes the Kryptonians to the Fortress of Solitude, and he goes with Aquaman, Murk, and Nuidis Vulko. They find out the alien ship is from Mongul and it has a mysterious energy source and violent prisoners. As Superman tries to exonerate the source, Murk and Vulko refused and explained it is against the law to take any unknown property that belonged to Atlantis' domain, especially the fragment. Supergirl helps Jon Kent in healing the mysterious Kryptonian where she reveals that Kryptonian speaks a dead Kryptonian language called Falkiri, and the Kryptonian was sent by Mongul.

Superman calms the mysterious Kryptonian down, and she reveals her name is Thao-La. Vulko explains the mysterious energy source of the fragment is called "Genesis". Superman realizes that Mongul is dead and there's a new Mongul around. Superman deals with an alien attack, and Steve Trevor arrives to get the Genesis. While talking to the Justice League, Earth and Atlantis is about to go to war, and Superman explains he must go to Warworld to free the slaves. Mongul's forces ambush Thao-La, but Lois Lane saves her. Thao-La kills Mongul's forces after the leader murders her closest friends for Mongul's honor and is about to kill Lois when Superman arrives after taking the Genesis and preventing an upcoming war. Jon Kent and Thao-La battle, while Lois tells Superman that Mongul has her entire race captive. Superman calms Thao-La down and convinces her to earn his trust promising her to save her people. Relieved, she broke her chain causing Mongul to activate the orphan box to kill her. However, Superman prevents her death and threatens Mongul by tossing the damaged Orphan box at his face, leaving him intrigued. While Thao-La is in a coma for recovery, the Justice League arrive and tells Superman that they cannot go to Warworld because Earth needs to be protected. As a result of the political tensions among the entire world, the League decides to resign Superman from the team. Batman tells Superman that his power levels are dropping, but Superman promises he will be okay. After he consoles Jon and Lois, Superman goes with his team (Apollo, Midnighter, Enchantress, Manchester Black, Guardian, and Lightray (Lia Nelson) to confront Mongul.

=== Main plot ===
Thaaros, the leader of the United Planets, overhears from an underling, Thalric, that Superman is requesting aid for the liberation of Warworld, but is quickly angered when Thalric mentions Phaelosians. Thaaros tells Thalric to leave, threatening him not to inform the United Planets about the Phaelosians. Arriving at Warworld, Superman and the Authority when he follow a trail of alien corpses to Mongul's arena. Superman meets Chaytil, the servant of Mongul, and Chaytil summons the Champions of Mongul. The champions of Mongul reveal Superman's weakened state, and Mongul (the son of the original Mongul, referred to as Mongul, or "Mongul-Who-Is") appears. Thaaros convinces the United Planets council to not aid Superman due to the power vacuum that will be created once Mongul is defeated. During the battle, Lightray is killed, Apollo is incapacitated, and Midnighter escapes while Superman the remaining Authority members are captured. Superman breaks free, and retrieves Lightray's body. Mongul quickly intercepts him, stabbing him in the back with a Kryptonite spear. The United Planets council is shocked by his defeat, much to Thaaros' satisfaction.

Superman is held prisoner by Mongul's son, and OMAC tries to break free but is knocked out by Mongol's son. Mongul's son tells Superman to execute an underling name Khaljo who let Midnighter escape, and if Superman refuses then Mongul's son will come after Jon Kent. Superman refuses and is beaten to a pulp and thrown in jail where he meets and befriends another prisoner named Kryl-Ux. Midnighter tries to help Superman escape by blowing up the planet and destroying the red sun generators, but Superman refuses, saying that he will not give up hope. Superman still fights in the gladiator tournament and gains more respect from the prisoners, except Kryl-Ux, who explains that his family was killed by Mongul and was taken as prisoners. While traveling in Warworld, Superman sees alien writing on the wall and realizes the Warworld aliens, known as Warzoons, can't read the alien writing and plans to decipher it to free the prisoners. Superman asks Kryl-Ux how to fight like a gladiator, and Midnighter finds Apollo. While fighting in Warworld, Superman starts to gain more respect from the Warzoon audience, and Mongul realizes killing Superman will turn him into a martyr. OMAC discovers that Lightray is in a coma, and while Superman bonds with prisoners Otho-Ra and her brother in prison he finds out that Midnight is planning to destroy Warworld. Kryl-Ux sneaks Superman out of prison to go to a tomb where Superman can gain power, but just then prison guards arrive to kill all the prisoners as punishment for Superman standing up to Mongul.

Midnighter arrived in time and rescued them. A few weeks later, Midnighter starts killing Mongul's prison guards and plans to blow up Warworld to find Apollo while OMAC is taken prisoner and controlled by Mongul. Just when Midnighter is about to give up hope, Superman arrives and stages a rebellion. Jon visits Lois Lane who is taking care of Thao-La until Kelex discovers that the genesis fragment might help recover Thao-La's seizure while Superman defeats OMAC. Superman learns there is another Orphan Box, an item that controls Mongul's army and Superman takes it from Mongul. After she finds the fragment's hiding place, Lois meets up with John Henry Irons to look after the Phalesosian girl when there's a sudden bright flash of blue light and they hear Superman's voice.

Superman saves Manchester Black from getting tortured and finds a being called the Orphan Box. Byla tells Superman that he's getting his powers back because he was in contact with Genesis, and Mongul wants the Fire of Olgrun (the Power of the Old Gods). Meanwhile, Mongul starts attacking other planets after finding out the United Planets have created a War Engine that can repel Warworld, as informed by Thaaros who reveals his alliance with him. Superman and his team go to the heart of Warworld to rescue Enchantress where they are attacked by Mother, an undead Witch Queen that Mongul has allied with. Mother attacks Mongul, but Mongul kills Mother and resurrects her under a different form by using Lightray's body and calling her Razor Blade. Meanwhile, it turns out Lois and John Henry Irons could hear Superman's voice because of Natasha Irons, who tells them that Genesis is the key to saving Thao-La. They save Thao-La by bringing her to the sun, and Amanda Waller sends Conduit to suit up to deal with future Superman threats.

Mongul unleashes his mind-controlled OMAC, Black Razor, and Apollo on planets killing hundreds of innocent people. Natasha Iron plans to steal one of Mongul's star forges, and convert the red sun to a regular sun to fully power up Superman and other Phaelosians. Superman tells Midnighter, Khal-Jo, Manchester Black, Enchantress, Natasha, Leonath, and Kryl-Ux to try to free Apollo, OMAC, and Black Razor. While exploring, Superman meets Byleth, who reveals that he is the servant of the Old Gods and plans to test Superman if he is worthy to gain the Fire of Olgrun.

The Old Gods send a beast to attack Superman, but Superman tricks the beast into defeating itself. Superman enters the doorway to the Old Gods where he meets a young girl made of energy, and passes a test that deems him worthy of gaining the Fire of Olgrun. Superman goes back to the real world but is shocked to see Kryl-Ux with Mongul as he threatens to kill two children. Mongul kills one of the children, which enrages Superman and Superman fights Mongul, eventually regaining his super powers and defeating him soundly. Superman's allies eventually free OMAC, Black Razor, and Apollo from Mongul's mind control, Superman brings the dead child back to life, and Kryl-Ux kills the weakened Mongul while explaining that he let Mongul murder his people in order for Superman to come and help defeat Mongul. Kryl-Ux disappears before confronting Thaaros for his betrayal, and Superman helps the Warworld survivors before returning to Earth to meet with Lois Lane.

== Main issues involved ==
1. Future State: Superman: Worlds of War #1-2 (2021)
2. Superman #29 (2021)
3. Action Comics #1029-1032 (2021)
4. Action Comics 2021 Annual
5. Action Comics #1033-1043 (2021–2022)
6. Action Comics 2022 Annual
7. Action Comics #1044-1046 (2022)
8. Superman: Warworld Apocalypse (2022)

== Critical reception ==
According to Comic Book Roundup, Action Comics #1036 received an average score of 7.9 out of 10 based on 14 reviews. David Brooke from AIPT wrote: "All in all, Action Comics #1036 begins a story that feels huge in its scope as it introduces readers to a new world and a bevy of evil characters. It also has its heart in the right place as Superman can't stand the awfulness of Warworld while setting up an adventure we've never seen Superman face since he was created 83 years ago. It's a masterclass in worldbuilding". Deron Generally from The Super Powered Fancast wrote: "Mendonca delivers some blistering art throughout the issue. The art is vibrant, violent and gorgeously detailed and delivers on the dramatic tone of the story". Action Comics #1037 received an average score of 8.5 out of 10 based on 12 reviews. Action Comics #1038 received an average score of 8.5 out of 10 based on 12 reviews. Action Comics #1039 received an average score of 8.9 out of 10 based on 10 reviews. Action Comics #1040 received an average score of 9 out of 10 based on 10 reviews. Action Comics #1042 received an average score of 8.4 out of 10 based on 8 reviews. Action Comics #1043 received an average score of 8.9 out of 10 based on 6 reviews. Action Comics #1044 received an average score of 8.4 out of 10 based on 8 reviews. Action Comics #1045 received an average score of 8.5 out of 10 based on 8 reviews. Action Comics #1046 received an average score of 8.9 out of 10 based on 7 reviews. Superman: Warworld Apocalypse #1 received an average score of 8.5 out of 10 based on 9 reviews.
