= 2011 in downloadable songs for the Rock Band series =

- Songs released: 321
- Packs released: 49
- Albums released: 1

The Rock Band series of music video games supports downloadable songs for the Xbox 360, PlayStation 3, and Wii versions through the consoles' respective online services. Users can download songs on a track-by-track basis, with many of the tracks also offered as part of a "song pack" or complete album at a discounted rate. These packs are available for the Wii only on Rock Band 3. Most downloadable songs are playable within every game mode, including the Band World Tour career mode. All downloadable songs released before October 26, 2010 are cross-compatible between Rock Band, Rock Band 2 and Rock Band 3, while those after only work with Rock Band 3. Certain songs deemed "suitable for all ages" by Harmonix are also available for use in Lego Rock Band.

The Wii version of Rock Band does not support downloadable content, but Rock Band 2 and Rock Band 3 do, with DLC first made available in January 2009. Songs from the back catalogue of downloadable content were released for the Wii weekly in an effort by Harmonix to provide Wii players with every previously available song.

Following the release of Rock Band 4 for the PlayStation 4 and Xbox One, all previously purchased downloadable content for Rock Band 3 and earlier is forward compatible (with the exception of any downloadable content purchased for The Beatles: Rock Band) within the same system family at no additional cost.

== List of songs released in 2011 ==
The following table lists the available songs for the Rock Band series released in 2011. All songs available in packs are also available as individual song downloads on the same date, unless otherwise noted. New songs are released on Tuesdays for Xbox Live, PlayStation Network, and Nintendo WFC, unless otherwise noted. Dates listed are the initial release of songs on Xbox Live. Starting May 20, 2008, all downloadable songs are available in both the North American and European markets, unless otherwise noted.

As of October 2009, over 800 songs have been made available as downloadable content (DLC). As of October 19, 2009, over 60 million downloadable song purchases have been made by players. The following is a list of the songs that have been released in 2011.

Some songs released before Rock Band 3 have been retrofitted to include Rock Band 3 features, including backing vocals, and the ability to buy an additional pack for Pro Guitar/Bass charts without having to buy the "RB3 Version" of the song. Certain songs have been marked "family friendly" by Harmonix; such songs released before Rock Band 3's launch on October 26, 2010 can be played in Lego Rock Band.

Since October 26, 2010 (with The Doors Pack 01), all new songs are only playable in Rock Band 3, due to a change in the file format. All songs released via downloadable content are playable in Rock Band 3, and support its new Pro Drum mode. Most songs released for Rock Band 3 include core features for keyboards, Pro Keyboards, and backing vocals in the core song, where they are appropriate. Additionally, some of these songs features charts for Pro Guitar and Bass that can also be purchased.

Song title	Artist	Year	Genre	Single / Pack name	Release date	Family Friendly	Additional Rock Band 3 Features
"Cry, Cry, Cry"	Johnny Cash	1955	Country	Johnny Cash 01	Jan 4, 2011	Yes	Core
"Don't Take Your Guns to Town"	Johnny Cash	1958	Country	Johnny Cash 01	Jan 4, 2011	No	Core
"Five Feet High and Rising"	Johnny Cash	1959	Country	Johnny Cash 01	Jan 4, 2011	Yes	Core
"Folsom Prison Blues"	Johnny Cash	1955	Country	Johnny Cash 01	Jan 4, 2011	No	Core
"I Got Stripes"	Johnny Cash	1959	Country	Johnny Cash 01	Jan 4, 2011	Yes	Core
"I Walk the Line"	Johnny Cash	1956	Country	Johnny Cash 01	Jan 4, 2011	Yes	Core & Pro Guitar/Bass
"Tennessee Flat Top Box"	Johnny Cash	1961	Country	Johnny Cash 01	Jan 4, 2011	Yes	Core & Pro Guitar/Bass
"The Ballad of Ira Hayes"	Johnny Cash	1964	Country	Johnny Cash 01	Jan 4, 2011	No	Core
"Visions" (Note: Song is available at no cost.) (Note: Song is not available for the Wii platform.) (Note: Song is only available in a pack and cannot be downloaded individually.)	Abnormality	2007	Metal	Rock Band Free 01	Jan 4, 2011	No	None
"Get Clean"	Anarchy Club	2009	Metal	Rock Band Free 01	Jan 4, 2011	No	None
"Night Lies"	Bang Camaro	2008	Rock	Rock Band Free 01	Jan 4, 2011	No	None
"Shoulder to the Plow"	Breaking Wheel	2008	Metal	Rock Band Free 01	Jan 4, 2011	No	None
"Welcome to the Neighborhood"	Libyans	2008	Punk	Rock Band Free 01	Jan 4, 2011	No	None
"A Jagged Gorgeous Winter"	The Main Drag	2008	Indie Rock	Rock Band Free 01	Jan 4, 2011	No	None
"Conventional Lover"	Speck	2007	Pop-Rock	Rock Band Free 01	Jan 4, 2011	No	None
"Supreme Girl"	The Sterns	2006	Pop-Rock	Rock Band Free 01	Jan 4, 2011	No	None
"Rob the Prez-O-Dent"	That Handsome Devil	2008	Rock	Rock Band Free 01	Jan 4, 2011	No	None
"Crawling"	Linkin Park	2000	Nu-Metal	Linkin Park 01	Jan 11, 2011	No	Core
"In the End"	Linkin Park	2000	Nu-Metal	Linkin Park 01	Jan 11, 2011	No	Core & Pro Guitar/Bass
"Numb"	Linkin Park	2003	Nu-Metal	Linkin Park 01	Jan 11, 2011	No	Core
"Somewhere I Belong"	Linkin Park	2003	Nu-Metal	Linkin Park 01	Jan 11, 2011	No	Core
"Waiting for the End"	Linkin Park	2010	Nu-Metal	Linkin Park 01	Jan 11, 2011	No	Core
"What I've Done"	Linkin Park	2007	Nu-Metal	Linkin Park 01	Jan 11, 2011	No	Core & Pro Guitar/Bass
"Made of Scars"	Stone Sour	2006	Metal	Stone Sour 01	Jan 18, 2011	Yes	Core
"Say You'll Haunt Me"	Stone Sour	2010	Metal	Stone Sour 01	Jan 18, 2011	Yes	Core & Pro Guitar/Bass
"Through Glass"	Stone Sour	2006	Metal	Stone Sour 01	Jan 18, 2011	Yes	Core
"Blue Jean" (Note: Song is no longer available for purchase.)	David Bowie	1984	Glam	David Bowie 02	Jan 25, 2011	Yes	Core
"Fame"	David Bowie	1975	Glam	David Bowie 02	Jan 25, 2011	Yes	Core
"Modern Love"	David Bowie	1983	Glam	David Bowie 02	Jan 25, 2011	Yes	Core & Pro Guitar/Bass
"Young Americans"	David Bowie	1975	Glam	David Bowie 02	Jan 25, 2011	No	Core
"Ziggy Stardust"	David Bowie	1972	Glam	David Bowie 02	Jan 25, 2011	No	Core & Pro Guitar/Bass
"Freakshow" (Note: Song is only available through codes found on packages of Schick razors and is not available through the Music Store or console marketplaces.) (Note: Song is an updated version of a song previously released through the Rock Band Network.) (Note: Song includes Pro Guitar and Bass charts in the base price; the charts do not need to be purchased separately.)	HourCast	2010	Rock	Schick Promo Pack	Feb 1, 2011	Yes	Core & Pro Guitar/Bass
"Don't Feel Like That Anymore"	Johnny Cooper	2009	Rock	Schick Promo Pack	Feb 1, 2011	Yes	Core & Pro Guitar/Bass
"Appetite"	The Gracious Few	2010	Rock	Schick Promo Pack	Feb 1, 2011	No	Core & Pro Guitar/Bass
"London Calling"	The Clash	1979	Punk	London Calling	Feb 1, 2011	No	Core & Pro Guitar/Bass
"Brand New Cadillac"	The Clash	1979	Punk	London Calling	Feb 1, 2011	No	Core
"Jimmy Jazz"	The Clash	1979	Punk	London Calling	Feb 1, 2011	No	Core
"Hateful"	The Clash	1979	Punk	London Calling	Feb 1, 2011	No	Core
"Rudie Can't Fail"	The Clash	1979	Punk	London Calling	Feb 1, 2011	No	Core & Pro Guitar/Bass
"Spanish Bombs"	The Clash	1979	Punk	London Calling	Feb 1, 2011	No	Core & Pro Guitar/Bass
"The Right Profile"	The Clash	1979	Punk	London Calling	Feb 1, 2011	No	Core
"Lost in the Supermarket"	The Clash	1979	Punk	London Calling	Feb 1, 2011	No	Core
"Clampdown"	The Clash	1979	Punk	London Calling	Feb 1, 2011	No	Core & Pro Guitar/Bass
"The Guns of Brixton"	The Clash	1979	Punk	London Calling	Feb 1, 2011	No	Core
"Wrong 'Em Boyo"	The Clash	1979	Punk	London Calling	Feb 1, 2011	No	Core
"Death or Glory"	The Clash	1979	Punk	London Calling	Feb 1, 2011	No	Core
"Koka Kola"	The Clash	1979	Punk	London Calling	Feb 1, 2011	No	Core
"The Card Cheat"	The Clash	1979	Punk	London Calling	Feb 1, 2011	No	Core & Pro Guitar/Bass
"Lover's Rock"	The Clash	1979	Punk	London Calling	Feb 1, 2011	No	Core
"Four Horsemen"	The Clash	1979	Punk	London Calling	Feb 1, 2011	No	Core
"I'm Not Down"	The Clash	1979	Punk	London Calling	Feb 1, 2011	No	Core
"Revolution Rock"	The Clash	1979	Punk	London Calling	Feb 1, 2011	No	Core
"Bend Down Low"	Bob Marley and the Wailers	1974	Reggae/Ska	Bob Marley 01	Feb 8, 2011	Yes	Core
"Burnin' and Lootin'"	Bob Marley and the Wailers	1973	Reggae/Ska	Bob Marley 01	Feb 8, 2011	No	Core
"Coming in from the Cold"	Bob Marley and the Wailers	1980	Reggae/Ska	Bob Marley 01	Feb 8, 2011	Yes	Core
"Kaya"	Bob Marley and the Wailers	1978	Reggae/Ska	Bob Marley 01	Feb 8, 2011	No	Core
"Lively Up Yourself"	Bob Marley and the Wailers	1974	Reggae/Ska	Bob Marley 01	Feb 8, 2011	Yes	Core
"No More Trouble"	Bob Marley and the Wailers	1973	Reggae/Ska	Bob Marley 01	Feb 8, 2011	Yes	Core
"Small Axe"	Bob Marley and the Wailers	1973	Reggae/Ska	Bob Marley 01	Feb 8, 2011	Yes	Core
"Them Belly Full (But We Hungry)"	Bob Marley and the Wailers	1974	Reggae/Ska	Bob Marley 01	Feb 8, 2011	Yes	Core & Pro Guitar/Bass
"Obsession"	Animotion	1984	New Wave	February Heartache Duets' Pack	Feb 11, 2011	No	Core
"Airplanes"	B.o.B (featuring Hayley Williams)	2010	Hip-Hop/Rap	February Heartache Duets' Pack	Feb 11, 2011	Yes	Core
"Total Eclipse of the Heart"	Bonnie Tyler	1983	Pop-Rock	February Heartache Duets' Pack	Feb 11, 2011	Yes	Core
"Don't You Want Me"	The Human League	1981	Pop/Dance/Electronic	February Heartache Duets' Pack	Feb 11, 2011	Yes	Core
"Need You Now"	Lady Antebellum	2010	Country	February Heartache Duets' Pack	Feb 11, 2011	No	Core
"Paradise by the Dashboard Light"	Meat Loaf	1977	Classic Rock	February Heartache Duets' Pack	Feb 11, 2011	No	Core
"Stop Draggin' My Heart Around"	Stevie Nicks	1981	Classic Rock	February Heartache Duets' Pack	Feb 11, 2011	Yes	Core & Pro Guitar/Bass
"Fire and Ice"	Pat Benatar	1981	Classic Rock	Pat Benatar 01	Feb 22, 2011	Yes	Core
"Love is a Battlefield"	Pat Benatar	1983	Classic Rock	Pat Benatar 01	Feb 22, 2011	Yes	Core
"Shadows of the Night"	Pat Benatar	1982	Classic Rock	Pat Benatar 01	Feb 22, 2011	Yes	Core
"We Belong"	Pat Benatar	1984	Classic Rock	Pat Benatar 01	Feb 22, 2011	Yes	Core & Pro Guitar/Bass
"Invincible"	Pat Benatar	1985	Classic Rock	Pat Benatar 01	Feb 22, 2011	Yes	Core
"Promises in the Dark"	Pat Benatar	1981	Classic Rock	Pat Benatar 01	Feb 22, 2011	Yes	Core
"Terrible Lie"	Nine Inch Nails	1989	Rock	Pretty Hate Pack 01	Mar 1, 2011	No	Core
"Head Like a Hole"	Nine Inch Nails	1989	Rock	Pretty Hate Pack 01	Mar 1, 2011	No	Core & Pro Guitar/Bass
"Sanctified"	Nine Inch Nails	1989	Rock	Pretty Hate Pack 01	Mar 1, 2011	No	Core
"The Only Time"	Nine Inch Nails	1989	Rock	Pretty Hate Pack 01	Mar 1, 2011	No	Core
"Never Let Me Down Again"	Depeche Mode	1987	Pop/Dance/Electronic	Depeche Mode 01	Mar 8, 2011	Yes	Core
"Personal Jesus"	Depeche Mode	1990	Pop/Dance/Electronic	Depeche Mode 01	Mar 8, 2011	No	Core & Pro Guitar/Bass
"Policy of Truth"	Depeche Mode	1990	Pop/Dance/Electronic	Depeche Mode 01	Mar 8, 2011	Yes	Core
"I Will Possess Your Heart"	Death Cab for Cutie	2008	Indie Rock	Single	Mar 8, 2011	Yes	Core
"Shooting the Moon"	OK Go	2010	Pop-Rock	Single	Mar 15, 2011	Yes	Core
"Every Breath You Take"	The Police	1983	Rock	Single	Mar 15, 2011	Yes	Core & Pro Guitar/Bass
"So Lonely"	The Police	1978	Rock	Single	Mar 15, 2011	Yes	Core
"Spill the Wine"	WAR	1970	R&B/Soul/Funk	Single	Mar 15, 2011	No	Core
"I Go to Extremes"	Billy Joel	1989	Classic Rock	Billy Joel Piano Challenge	Mar 22, 2011	Yes	Core
"Miami 2017 (Seen the Lights Go Out on Broadway)"	Billy Joel	1976	Classic Rock	Billy Joel Piano Challenge	Mar 22, 2011	No	Core
"My Life"	Billy Joel	1978	Classic Rock	Billy Joel Piano Challenge	Mar 22, 2011	Yes	Core
"Prelude/Angry Young Man"	Billy Joel	1976	Classic Rock	Billy Joel Piano Challenge	Mar 22, 2011	No	Core & Pro Guitar/Bass
"Scenes from an Italian Restaurant"	Billy Joel	1977	Classic Rock	Billy Joel Piano Challenge	Mar 22, 2011	No	Core
"She's Always a Woman"	Billy Joel	1977	Classic Rock	Billy Joel Piano Challenge	Mar 22, 2011	Yes	Core
"Somebody to Love"	Jefferson Airplane	1967	Classic Rock	Days of Peace 01	Mar 29, 2011	No	Core
"Spinning Wheel"	Blood, Sweat & Tears	1968	Classic Rock	Days of Peace 01	Mar 29, 2011	Yes	Core
"Black Magic Woman"	Santana	1970	Classic Rock	Days of Peace 01	Mar 29, 2011	No	Core & Pro Guitar/Bass
"Through the Fire and Flames"	DragonForce	2006	Metal	Single	Mar 29, 2011	No	Core & Pro Guitar/Bass
"Operation Ground and Pound"	DragonForce	2006	Metal	Single	Mar 29, 2011	No	Core
"The Loco-Motion"	Grand Funk Railroad	1974	Classic Rock	Single	Apr 5, 2011	Yes	Core
"We're an American Band"	Grand Funk Railroad	1973	Classic Rock	Single	Apr 5, 2011	No	Core & Pro Guitar/Bass
"Freeze-Frame"	The J. Geils Band	1981	Rock	Single	Apr 5, 2011	Yes	Core & Pro Guitar/Bass
"Love Will Tear Us Apart"	Joy Division	1980	New Wave	Single	Apr 5, 2011	Yes	Core & Pro Guitar/Bass
"Dreams"	Fleetwood Mac	1977	Classic Rock	Fleetwood Mac/Stevie Nicks 01	Apr 12, 2011	Yes	Core & Pro Guitar/Bass
"Gold Dust Woman"	Fleetwood Mac	1977	Classic Rock	Fleetwood Mac/Stevie Nicks 01	Apr 12, 2011	Yes	Core
"Landslide"	Fleetwood Mac	1975	Classic Rock	Fleetwood Mac/Stevie Nicks 01	Apr 12, 2011	Yes	Core
"Rhiannon"	Fleetwood Mac	1975	Classic Rock	Fleetwood Mac/Stevie Nicks 01	Apr 12, 2011	Yes	Core
"Edge of Seventeen (Just Like the White Winged Dove)"	Stevie Nicks	1981	Classic Rock	Fleetwood Mac/Stevie Nicks 01	Apr 12, 2011	Yes	Core & Pro Guitar/Bass
"Stand Back"	Stevie Nicks	1983	Classic Rock	Fleetwood Mac/Stevie Nicks 01	Apr 12, 2011	Yes	Core
"Breaking"	Anberlin	2008	Alternative	Single	Apr 19, 2011	Yes	Core
"Blood and Thunder"	Mastodon	2004	Metal	Single	Apr 19, 2011	No	Core & Pro Guitar/Bass
"Fire"	Ohio Players	1974	R&B/Soul/Funk	Single	Apr 19, 2011	No	Core
"Love Rollercoaster"	Ohio Players	1975	R&B/Soul/Funk	Single	Apr 19, 2011	Yes	Core & Pro Guitar/Bass
"Must Have Done Something Right"	Relient K	2007	Pop-Rock	Single	Apr 19, 2011	Yes	Core
"867-5309/Jenny"	Tommy Tutone	1981	Rock	Single	Apr 19, 2011	Yes	Core & Pro Guitar/Bass
"Blue Bayou"	Roy Orbison	1963	Classic Rock	Roy Orbison: 75th Birthday Pack	Apr 26, 2011	Yes	Core
"Dream Baby (How Long Must I Dream)"	Roy Orbison	1962	Classic Rock	Roy Orbison: 75th Birthday Pack	Apr 26, 2011	Yes	Core
"Only the Lonely (Know the Way I Feel)"	Roy Orbison	1960	Classic Rock	Roy Orbison: 75th Birthday Pack	Apr 26, 2011	Yes	Core & Pro Guitar/Bass
"Rock and Roll All Nite" (Live)	Kiss	1975	Classic Rock	Single	Apr 26, 2011	Yes	Core & Pro Guitar/Bass
"Strutter" (Live)	Kiss	1975	Classic Rock	Single	Apr 26, 2011	Yes	Core
"Do You Really Want to Hurt Me"	Culture Club	1982	New Wave	Single	May 3, 2011	Yes	Core
"From Out of Nowhere"	Faith No More	1989	Rock	Single	May 3, 2011	Yes	Core
"Working for the Weekend"	Loverboy	1981	Pop-Rock	Single	May 3, 2011	Yes	Core & Pro Guitar/Bass
"Stash"	Phish	1992	Rock	Single	May 3, 2011	No	Core & Pro Guitar/Bass
"Tweezer"	Phish	1992	Rock	Single	May 3, 2011	No	Core
"Big Bang Baby"	Stone Temple Pilots	1996	Alternative	Single	May 3, 2011	Yes	Core & Pro Guitar/Bass
"Long Road to Ruin"	Foo Fighters	2007	Alternative	Foo Fighters 04	May 10, 2011	No	Core
"Rope"	Foo Fighters	2011	Alternative	Foo Fighters 04	May 10, 2011	Yes	Core & Pro Guitar/Bass
"Stacked Actors"	Foo Fighters	1999	Alternative	Foo Fighters 04	May 10, 2011	No	Core
"Walk"	Foo Fighters	2011	Alternative	Foo Fighters 04	May 10, 2011	Yes	Core
"Hard Rock Hallelujah"	Lordi	2006	Metal	Single	May 10, 2011	No	Core
"King of Rock"	Run-DMC	1985	Hip-Hop/Rap	Single	May 10, 2011	No	Core
"5 Minutes Alone"	Pantera	1994	Metal	Pantera 01	May 19, 2011	No	Core & Pro Guitar/Bass
"Walk"	Pantera	1992	Metal	Pantera 01	May 19, 2011	No	Core & Pro Guitar/Bass
"Mouth for War"	Pantera	1992	Metal	Pantera 01	May 19, 2011	No	Core
"I'm Broken"	Pantera	1994	Metal	Pantera 01	May 19, 2011	No	Core
"Do You Feel Like We Do" (Live)	Peter Frampton	1976	Rock	Single	May 19, 2011	No	Core
"Born This Way"	Lady Gaga	2011	Pop/Dance/Electronic	Lady Gaga 02	May 23, 2011	No	Core
"LoveGame"	Lady Gaga	2008	Pop/Dance/Electronic	Lady Gaga 02	May 23, 2011	No	Core
"Paparazzi"	Lady Gaga	2008	Pop/Dance/Electronic	Lady Gaga 02	May 23, 2011	No	Core
"Hot Blooded"	Foreigner	1978	Classic Rock	Single	May 23, 2011	No	Core & Pro Guitar/Bass
"Urgent"	Foreigner	1981	Classic Rock	Single	May 23, 2011	Yes	Core & Pro Guitar/Bass
"Mr. Crowley"	Ozzy Osbourne	1980	Metal	Ozzy Osbourne 8-Pack	May 31, 2011	No	Core & Pro Guitar/Bass
"Over the Mountain"	Ozzy Osbourne	1981	Metal	Ozzy Osbourne 8-Pack	May 31, 2011	Yes	Core
"Bark at the Moon"	Ozzy Osbourne	1983	Metal	Ozzy Osbourne 8-Pack	May 31, 2011	No	Core & Pro Guitar/Bass
"Mama, I'm Coming Home"	Ozzy Osbourne	1991	Metal	Ozzy Osbourne 8-Pack	May 31, 2011	Yes	Core & Pro Guitar/Bass
"Steal Away (The Night)"	Ozzy Osbourne	1980	Metal	Ozzy Osbourne 8-Pack	May 31, 2011	No	Core
"Flying High Again"	Ozzy Osbourne	1981	Metal	Ozzy Osbourne 8-Pack	May 31, 2011	Yes	Core
"Diary of a Madman"	Ozzy Osbourne	1981	Metal	Ozzy Osbourne 8-Pack	May 31, 2011	No	Core
"I Don't Know"	Ozzy Osbourne	1980	Metal	Ozzy Osbourne 8-Pack	May 31, 2011	Yes	Core
"Grenade"	Bruno Mars	2010	Pop-Rock	Bruno Mars 01	Jun 7, 2011	No	Core
"Just the Way You Are"	Bruno Mars	2010	Pop-Rock	Bruno Mars 01	Jun 7, 2011	Yes	Core
"Marry You"	Bruno Mars	2010	Pop-Rock	Bruno Mars 01	Jun 7, 2011	No	Core
"Audience of One"	Rise Against	2008	Punk	Rise Against 02	Jun 7, 2011	Yes	Core & Pro Guitar/Bass
"Help Is on the Way"	Rise Against	2011	Punk	Rise Against 02	Jun 7, 2011	Yes	Core
"The Good Left Undone"	Rise Against	2006	Punk	Rise Against 02	Jun 7, 2011	Yes	Core & Pro Guitar/Bass
"Take On Me"	a-ha	1985	New Wave	Single	Jun 14, 2011	Yes	Core & Pro Guitar/Bass
"Unholy Confessions"	Avenged Sevenfold	2003	Metal	Single	Jun 14, 2011	No	Core & Pro Guitar/Bass
"Welcome to the Family"	Avenged Sevenfold	2010	Metal	Single	Jun 14, 2011	No	Core
"Tubthumping"	Chumbawamba	1997	Pop-Rock	Single	Jun 14, 2011	No	Core
"I Alone"	Live	1994	Alternative	Single	Jun 14, 2011	No	Core & Pro Guitar/Bass
"Lightning Crashes"	Live	1994	Alternative	Single	Jun 14, 2011	No	Core
"Misery"	Maroon 5	2010	Pop-Rock	Maroon 5 02	Jun 21, 2011	No	Core
"This Love"	Maroon 5	2002	Pop-Rock	Maroon 5 02	Jun 21, 2011	No	Core & Pro Guitar/Bass
"Won't Go Home Without You"	Maroon 5	2007	Pop-Rock	Maroon 5 02	Jun 21, 2011	Yes	Core
"Blurry"	Puddle of Mudd	2001	Alternative	Puddle of Mudd 01	Jun 21, 2011	No	Core
"Control"	Puddle of Mudd	2001	Alternative	Puddle of Mudd 01	Jun 21, 2011	No	Core
"She Hates Me"	Puddle of Mudd	2001	Alternative	Puddle of Mudd 01	Jun 21, 2011	No	Core & Pro Guitar/Bass
"Here Without You"	3 Doors Down	2002	Rock	3 Doors Down 01	Jun 28, 2011	Yes	Core
"When I'm Gone"	3 Doors Down	2002	Rock	3 Doors Down 01	Jun 28, 2011	No	Core & Pro Guitar/Bass
"When You're Young"	3 Doors Down	2011	Rock	3 Doors Down 01	Jun 28, 2011	Yes	Core
"Nothin' but a Good Time"	Poison	1988	Glam	Poison 01	Jun 28, 2011	No	Core & Pro Guitar/Bass
"Talk Dirty to Me"	Poison	1986	Glam	Poison 01	Jun 28, 2011	No	Core
"Unskinny Bop"	Poison	1990	Glam	Poison 01	Jun 28, 2011	No	Core
"For What It's Worth"	Buffalo Springfield	1967	Classic Rock	Single	Jul 5, 2011	No	Core & Pro Guitar/Bass
"Man on the Moon"	R.E.M.	1992	Alternative	Single	Jul 5, 2011	No	Core
"Aerials"	System of a Down	2001	Nu-Metal	Single	Jul 5, 2011	Yes	Core & Pro Guitar/Bass
"Hypnotize"	System of a Down	2005	Nu-Metal	Single	Jul 5, 2011	Yes	Core
"Turning Japanese"	The Vapors	1980	Punk	Single	Jul 5, 2011	No	Core & Pro Guitar/Bass
"A Little Respect"	Erasure	1988	New Wave	Single	Jul 12, 2011	Yes	Core
"Relax (Come Fighting)"	Frankie Goes to Hollywood	1984	Pop/Dance/Electronic	Single	Jul 12, 2011	No	Core
"Boom"	P.O.D.	2001	Nu-Metal	Single	Jul 12, 2011	No	Core & Pro Guitar/Bass
"Youth of the Nation"	P.O.D.	2001	Nu-Metal	Single	Jul 12, 2011	No	Core
"Blow Up the Outside World"	Soundgarden	1996	Grunge	Celebrating Soundgarden On Tour 2011	Jul 19, 2011	No	Core
"Burden in My Hand"	Soundgarden	1996	Grunge	Celebrating Soundgarden On Tour 2011	Jul 19, 2011	No	Core & Pro Guitar/Bass
"Fell on Black Days"	Soundgarden	1994	Grunge	Celebrating Soundgarden On Tour 2011	Jul 19, 2011	Yes	Core
"Outshined"	Soundgarden	1991	Grunge	Celebrating Soundgarden On Tour 2011	Jul 19, 2011	No	Core & Pro Guitar/Bass
"Rusty Cage"	Soundgarden	1991	Grunge	Celebrating Soundgarden On Tour 2011	Jul 19, 2011	No	Core
"The Day I Tried to Live"	Soundgarden	1994	Grunge	Celebrating Soundgarden On Tour 2011	Jul 19, 2011	No	Core & Pro Guitar/Bass
"Heart of the Sunrise"	Yes	1971	Prog	Yes 01	Jul 26, 2011	Yes	Core
"I've Seen All Good People"	Yes	1971	Prog	Yes 01	Jul 26, 2011	Yes	Core & Pro Guitar/Bass
"Owner of a Lonely Heart"	Yes	1983	Prog	Yes 01	Jul 26, 2011	Yes	Core & Pro Guitar/Bass
"South Side of the Sky"	Yes	1971	Prog	Yes 01	Jul 26, 2011	Yes	Core
"Starship Trooper"	Yes	1971	Prog	Yes 01	Jul 26, 2011	Yes	Core
"Make Some Noise"	Beastie Boys	2011	Hip-Hop/Rap	Single	Aug 2, 2011	No	Core
"No Sleep till Brooklyn"	Beastie Boys	1986	Hip-Hop/Rap	Single	Aug 2, 2011	No	Core
"Barracuda"	Heart	1977	Classic Rock	Single	Aug 2, 2011	Yes	Core & Pro Guitar/Bass
"Super Bad, Pts. 1 & 2"	James Brown	1970	R&B/Soul/Funk	Single	Aug 2, 2011	No	Core & Pro Guitar/Bass
"Tell Me Something Good"	Rufus (featuring Chaka Khan)	1974	R&B/Soul/Funk	Single	Aug 2, 2011	No	Core
"Animal" (Live)	Def Leppard	2011	Rock	Def Leppard 01	Aug 9, 2011	No	Core & Pro Guitar/Bass
"Bringin' On the Heartbreak"	Def Leppard	1981	Rock	Def Leppard 01	Aug 9, 2011	Yes	Core & Pro Guitar/Bass
"Photograph"	Def Leppard	1983	Rock	Def Leppard 01	Aug 9, 2011	No	Core & Pro Guitar/Bass
"Pour Some Sugar on Me" (Live)	Def Leppard	2011	Rock	Def Leppard 01	Aug 9, 2011	No	Core & Pro Guitar/Bass
"Rock of Ages"	Def Leppard	1983	Rock	Def Leppard 01	Aug 9, 2011	No	Core & Pro Guitar/Bass
"Undefeated"	Def Leppard	2011	Rock	Def Leppard 01	Aug 9, 2011	No	Core & Pro Guitar/Bass
"Dance, Dance"	Fall Out Boy	2005	Pop-Rock	Fall Out Boy 01	Aug 16, 2011	No	Core
"Sugar, We're Goin Down"	Fall Out Boy	2005	Pop-Rock	Fall Out Boy 01	Aug 16, 2011	No	Core & Pro Guitar/Bass
"Thnks fr th Mmrs"	Fall Out Boy	2007	Pop-Rock	Fall Out Boy 01	Aug 16, 2011	No	Core
"Child in Time"	Deep Purple	1970	Prog	Single	Aug 16, 2011	No	Core
"Adolescents"	Incubus	2011	Alternative	Incubus 01	Aug 23, 2011	Yes	Core
"Pardon Me"	Incubus	1999	Alternative	Incubus 01	Aug 23, 2011	No	Core & Pro Guitar/Bass
"Wish You Were Here"	Incubus	2001	Alternative	Incubus 01	Aug 23, 2011	Yes	Core
"By the Way"	Red Hot Chili Peppers	2002	Alternative	I'm With the Chili Peppers	Aug 30, 2011	No	Core & Pro Guitar/Bass
"Californication"	Red Hot Chili Peppers	1999	Alternative	I'm With the Chili Peppers	Aug 30, 2011	No	Core & Pro Guitar/Bass
"Look Around"	Red Hot Chili Peppers	2011	Alternative	I'm With the Chili Peppers	Aug 30, 2011	No	Core
"Monarchy of Roses"	Red Hot Chili Peppers	2011	Alternative	I'm With the Chili Peppers	Aug 30, 2011	No	Core
"Otherside"	Red Hot Chili Peppers	1999	Alternative	I'm With the Chili Peppers	Aug 30, 2011	No	Core & Pro Guitar/Bass
"Parallel Universe"	Red Hot Chili Peppers	1999	Alternative	I'm With the Chili Peppers	Aug 30, 2011	No	Core
"Scar Tissue"	Red Hot Chili Peppers	1999	Alternative	I'm With the Chili Peppers	Aug 30, 2011	No	Core
"The Adventures of Rain Dance Maggie"	Red Hot Chili Peppers	2011	Alternative	I'm With the Chili Peppers	Aug 30, 2011	No	Core & Pro Guitar/Bass
"I Want You to Want Me" (Live)	Cheap Trick	1979	Pop-Rock	Cheap Trick 01	Sep 6, 2011	Yes	Core
"Surrender" (Live)	Cheap Trick	1979	Pop-Rock	Cheap Trick 01	Sep 6, 2011	No	Core & Pro Guitar/Bass
"Dream Police"	Cheap Trick	1979	Pop-Rock	Cheap Trick 01	Sep 6, 2011	Yes	Core
"Unbelievable" (Rock Band Re-Record)	EMF	1991	Pop/Dance/Electronic	Single	Sep 6, 2011	No	Core & Pro Guitar/Bass
"Me and Bobby McGee"	Janis Joplin & the Full Tilt Boogie Band	1971	Classic Rock	Single	Sep 13, 2011	Yes	Core
"Hash Pipe"	Weezer	2001	Alternative	Weezer 04	Sep 13, 2011	No	Core & Pro Guitar/Bass
"Island in the Sun"	Weezer	2001	Alternative	Weezer 04	Sep 13, 2011	Yes	Core
"Perfect Situation"	Weezer	2005	Alternative	Weezer 04	Sep 13, 2011	No	Core
"Heart-Shaped Box"	Nirvana	1993	Grunge	Celebrating Nirvana	Sep 20, 2011	No	Core & Pro Guitar/Bass
"Rape Me"	Nirvana	1993	Grunge	Celebrating Nirvana	Sep 20, 2011	No	Core
"All Apologies"	Nirvana	1993	Grunge	Celebrating Nirvana	Sep 20, 2011	No	Core
"You Know You're Right"	Nirvana	2002	Grunge	Celebrating Nirvana	Sep 20, 2011	Yes	Core
"Wait and Bleed"	Slipknot	1999	Nu-Metal	Slipknot 02	Sep 27, 2011	No	Core & Pro Guitar/Bass
"Left Behind"	Slipknot	2001	Nu-Metal	Slipknot 02	Sep 27, 2011	No	Core
"Pulse of the Maggots"	Slipknot	2004	Nu-Metal	Slipknot 02	Sep 27, 2011	No	Core
"Snuff"	Slipknot	2008	Nu-Metal	Slipknot 02	Sep 27, 2011	No	Core & Pro Guitar/Bass
"Gold Cobra"	Limp Bizkit	2011	Nu-Metal	Limp Bizkit 01	Oct 4, 2011	No	Core
"Nookie"	Limp Bizkit	1999	Nu-Metal	Limp Bizkit 01	Oct 4, 2011	No	Core & Pro Guitar/Bass
"My Way"	Limp Bizkit	2000	Nu-Metal	Limp Bizkit 01	Oct 4, 2011	No	Core
"Re-Arranged"	Limp Bizkit	1999	Nu-Metal	Limp Bizkit 01	Oct 4, 2011	No	Core
"Rock the Casbah"	The Clash	1982	Punk	Single	Oct 11, 2011	No	Core & Pro Guitar/Bass
"The Party Song"	Blink-182	1999	Punk	Blink-182 03	Oct 11, 2011	No	Core
"Stay Together for the Kids"	Blink-182	2001	Punk	Blink-182 03	Oct 11, 2011	Yes	Core
"Up All Night"	Blink-182	2011	Punk	Blink-182 03	Oct 11, 2011	Yes	Core & Pro Guitar/Bass
"Yellow"	Coldplay	2000	Alternative	Coldplay Collection 01	Oct 18, 2011	Yes	Core & Pro Guitar/Bass
"The Scientist"	Coldplay	2002	Alternative	Coldplay Collection 01	Oct 18, 2011	Yes	Core
"Clocks"	Coldplay	2002	Alternative	Coldplay Collection 01	Oct 18, 2011	Yes	Core & Pro Guitar/Bass
"Fix You"	Coldplay	2005	Alternative	Coldplay Collection 01	Oct 18, 2011	Yes	Core
"Viva la Vida"	Coldplay	2008	Alternative	Coldplay Collection 01	Oct 18, 2011	No	Core
"Every Teardrop Is a Waterfall"	Coldplay	2011	Alternative	Coldplay Collection 01	Oct 18, 2011	Yes	Core
"I Believe in a Thing Called Love"	The Darkness	2003	Glam	Single	Oct 25, 2011	No	Core & Pro Guitar/Bass
"Living Dead Girl"	Rob Zombie	1998	Nu-Metal	Single	Oct 25, 2011	No	Core
"Thunder Kiss '65"	White Zombie	1992	Metal	Single	Oct 25, 2011	No	Core
"Super-Charger Heaven"	White Zombie	1995	Metal	Single	Oct 25, 2011	No	Core & Pro Guitar/Bass
"Sooner or Later"	Breaking Benjamin	2004	Rock	Breaking Benjamin 02	Nov 1, 2011	Yes	Core
"Breath"	Breaking Benjamin	2006	Rock	Breaking Benjamin 02	Nov 1, 2011	No	Core & Pro Guitar/Bass
"Until the End"	Breaking Benjamin	2006	Rock	Breaking Benjamin 02	Nov 1, 2011	Yes	Core
"Forever"	Papa Roach	2006	Nu-Metal	Single	Nov 1, 2011	No	Core
"Single White Female" (RB3 Version)	Chely Wright	1999	Country	Going Country 05	Nov 8, 2011	No	Core
"Giddy On Up" (RB3 Version)	Laura Bell Bundy	2010	Country	Going Country 05	Nov 8, 2011	No	Core
"The Night The Lights Went Out in Georgia" (RB3 Version)	Reba McEntire	1991	Country	Going Country 05	Nov 8, 2011	No	Core
"Party for Two" (With Billy Currington) (RB3 Version)	Shania Twain	2004	Country	Going Country 05	Nov 8, 2011	No	Core
"Settlin'" (RB3 Version)	Sugarland	2006	Country	Going Country 05	Nov 8, 2011	No	Core
"That's How Country Boys Roll" (RB3 Version)	Billy Currington	2008	Country	Going Country 06	Nov 8, 2011	No	Core
"Awful, Beautiful Life" (RB3 Version)	Darryl Worley	2004	Country	Going Country 06	Nov 8, 2011	No	Core
"Man of Me" (RB3 Version)	Gary Allan	2001	Country	Going Country 06	Nov 8, 2011	No	Core
"Twang" (RB3 Version)	George Strait	2009	Country	Going Country 06	Nov 8, 2011	No	Core
"Ring of Fire" (RB3 Version)	Johnny Cash	1963	Country	Going Country 06	Nov 8, 2011	No	Core
"Backwoods" (RB3 Version)	Justin Moore	2009	Country	Going Country 06	Nov 8, 2011	No	Core
"Alright" (RB3 Version)	Darius Rucker	2008	Country	Going Country 07	Nov 8, 2011	No	Core
"Sideways" (RB3 Version)	Dierks Bentley	2009	Country	Going Country 07	Nov 8, 2011	No	Core
"Kiss a Girl" (RB3 Version)	Keith Urban	2009	Country	Going Country 07	Nov 8, 2011	No	Core
"Perfect Day" (RB3 Version)	Lady Antebellum	2010	Country	Going Country 07	Nov 8, 2011	No	Core
"Rain Is a Good Thing" (RB3 Version)	Luke Bryan	2009	Country	Going Country 07	Nov 8, 2011	No	Core
"Mama Tried" (RB3 Version)	Merle Haggard	1968	Country	Going Country 07	Nov 8, 2011	No	Core
"Ride" (RB3 Version)	Trace Adkins	2006	Country	Going Country 07	Nov 8, 2011	No	Core & Pro Guitar/Bass
"Intentional Heartache" (RB3 Version)	Dwight Yoakam	2005	Country	Going Country 08	Nov 8, 2011	No	Core
"Crazy Town" (RB3 Version)	Jason Aldean	2009	Country	Going Country 08	Nov 8, 2011	No	Core
"Summer Nights" (RB3 Version)	Rascal Flatts	2009	Country	Going Country 08	Nov 8, 2011	No	Core
"Superstition"	Stevie Wonder	1972	R&B/Soul/Funk	Stevie Wonder 01	Nov 15, 2011	Yes	Core
"Higher Ground"	Stevie Wonder	1973	R&B/Soul/Funk	Stevie Wonder 01	Nov 15, 2011	No	Core
"Living for the City"	Stevie Wonder	1973	R&B/Soul/Funk	Stevie Wonder 01	Nov 15, 2011	Yes	Core
"Sir Duke"	Stevie Wonder	1976	R&B/Soul/Funk	Stevie Wonder 01	Nov 15, 2011	Yes	Core & Pro Guitar/Bass
"I Wish"	Stevie Wonder	1976	R&B/Soul/Funk	Stevie Wonder 01	Nov 15, 2011	No	Core & Pro Guitar/Bass
"How You Remind Me"	Nickelback	2001	Rock	Nickelback Then and Now	Nov 22, 2011	No	Core & Pro Guitar/Bass
"Someday"	Nickelback	2003	Rock	Nickelback Then and Now	Nov 22, 2011	No	Core
"Animals"	Nickelback	2005	Rock	Nickelback Then and Now	Nov 22, 2011	No	Core
"If Today Was Your Last Day"	Nickelback	2008	Rock	Nickelback Then and Now	Nov 22, 2011	No	Core
"This Means War"	Nickelback	2011	Rock	Nickelback Then and Now	Nov 22, 2011	No	Core
"On the Backs of Angels"	Dream Theater	2011	Prog	Roadrunner Records 02	Nov 29, 2011	No	Core & Pro Guitar/Bass
"Ghost of Perdition"	Opeth	2005	Prog	Roadrunner Records 02	Nov 29, 2011	No	Core
"In Waves"	Trivium	2011	Metal	Roadrunner Records 02	Nov 29, 2011	Yes	Core
"We Built This City"	Starship	1985	Pop-Rock	Single	Nov 29, 2011	Yes	Core
"Seven Seas of Rhye"	Queen	1974	Classic Rock	Queen Extravaganza 02	Dec 6, 2011	Yes	Core
"Stone Cold Crazy"	Queen	1974	Classic Rock	Queen Extravaganza 02	Dec 6, 2011	No	Core & Pro Guitar/Bass
"I'm in Love With My Car"	Queen	1975	Classic Rock	Queen Extravaganza 02	Dec 6, 2011	Yes	Core
"You're My Best Friend"	Queen	1975	Classic Rock	Queen Extravaganza 02	Dec 6, 2011	Yes	Core
"Long Away"	Queen	1976	Classic Rock	Queen Extravaganza 02	Dec 6, 2011	Yes	Core
"Bicycle Race"	Queen	1978	Classic Rock	Queen Extravaganza 02	Dec 6, 2011	No	Core & Pro Guitar/Bass
"Don't Stop Me Now"	Queen	1978	Classic Rock	Queen Extravaganza 02	Dec 6, 2011	No	Core
"Radio Ga Ga"	Queen	1984	Classic Rock	Queen Extravaganza 02	Dec 6, 2011	Yes	Core
"The Show Must Go On"	Queen	1991	Classic Rock	Queen Extravaganza 02	Dec 6, 2011	Yes	Core
"Fly by Night"	Rush	1975	Prog	Rush 01	Dec 13, 2011	Yes	Core & Pro Guitar/Bass
"Caravan"	Rush	2010	Prog	Rush 01	Dec 13, 2011	Yes	Core
"The Spirit of Radio (Live)"	Rush	1980	Prog	Rush 01	Dec 13, 2011	Yes	Core & Pro Guitar/Bass
"Rebel Love Song" (Note: Song costs US$0.99 (80 MSP/100 Wii Points).)	Black Veil Brides	2011	Rock	Single	Dec 13, 2011	Yes	Core
"A Warrior's Call"	Volbeat	2010	Metal	Single	Dec 13, 2011	No	Core
"Long Hot Summer Night"	The Jimi Hendrix Experience	1968	Classic Rock	Experience Jimi Hendrix 01	Dec 20, 2011	Yes	Core
"Gypsy Eyes"	The Jimi Hendrix Experience	1968	Classic Rock	Experience Jimi Hendrix 01	Dec 20, 2011	Yes	Core
"All Along the Watchtower"	The Jimi Hendrix Experience	1968	Classic Rock	Experience Jimi Hendrix 01	Dec 20, 2011	Yes	Core & Pro Guitar/Bass
"Voodoo Child (Slight Return) (Live)"	Jimi Hendrix	1969	Classic Rock	Experience Jimi Hendrix 01	Dec 20, 2011	Yes	Core
"Dolly Dagger"	Jimi Hendrix	1971	Classic Rock	Experience Jimi Hendrix 01	Dec 20, 2011	No	Core
"Freedom"	Jimi Hendrix	1971	Classic Rock	Experience Jimi Hendrix 01	Dec 20, 2011	No	Core & Pro Guitar/Bass
"Angel"	Jimi Hendrix	1971	Classic Rock	Experience Jimi Hendrix 01	Dec 20, 2011	Yes	Core
"You Make Me Feel..."	Cobra Starship (ft. Sabi)	2011	Pop/Dance/Electronic	Fueled by Ramen 01	Dec 27, 2011	Yes	Core
"Stereo Hearts"	Gym Class Heroes (ft. Adam Levine)	2011	Hip-Hop/Rap	Fueled by Ramen 01	Dec 27, 2011	Yes	Core
"I Write Sins Not Tragedies"	Panic! at the Disco	2005	Emo	Fueled by Ramen 01	Dec 27, 2011	No	Core & Pro Guitar/Bass
"Pressure"	Paramore	2005	Pop-Rock	Fueled by Ramen 01	Dec 27, 2011	Yes	Core
"Panic"	Sublime with Rome	2011	Reggae/Ska	Fueled by Ramen 01	Dec 27, 2011	Yes	Core & Pro Guitar/Bass
"Billionaire"	Travie McCoy (ft. Bruno Mars)	2010	Hip-Hop/Rap	Fueled by Ramen 01	Dec 27, 2011	No	Core
"2112"	Rush	1976	Prog	Rush '2112'	Dec 31, 2011	Yes	Core & Pro Guitar/Bass
"2112: Overture, The Temples of Syrinx"	Rush	1976	Prog	Rush '2112'	Dec 31, 2011	Yes	Core & Pro Guitar/Bass
"2112: Discovery, Presentation"	Rush	1976	Prog	Rush '2112'	Dec 31, 2011	Yes	Core & Pro Guitar/Bass
"2112: Oracle: The Dream, Soliloquy, Grand Finale"	Rush	1976	Prog	Rush '2112'	Dec 31, 2011	Yes	Core & Pro Guitar/Bass
