= Marz =

Marz may refer to:

== People ==
- Marz (surname), notable people surnamed either Marz or März
- Marz (rapper), American rapper
- Marz Lovejoy, American hip hop musician and rapper

== Places ==
- Marz, Austria, a town in the district of Mattersburg, Burgenland, Austria
- Marz, East Azerbaijan, a village in East Azerbaijan Province, Iran
- Marz, Kerman, a village in Kerman Province, Iran
- Marz, Khonj, a village in Fars Province, Iran
- Marz, Mazandaran, a village in Mazandaran Province, Iran
- Marz, North Khorasan, a village in North Khorasan Province, Iran
- Marz Rural District, an administrative subdivision of Kerman Province, Iran
- Marz (territorial entity), a first level administrative division of Armenia

== Science and technology ==
- MARZ (Microsoft Active Reality Zone), codename for the 2001 Xbox console.

== See also ==
- Martz (disambiguation)
- Morz (disambiguation)
