= Martz =

Martz may refer to:

== People ==
- Martz (surname), notable people with the surname
- Martz Schmidt (1922–1998), Spanish comics writer and artist

== Places ==
- Martz (crater), an impact crater on Mars
- Martz Observatory, an organization devoted to the amateur astronomer
- Martz Rock Shelters, an American archeological site in Pennsylvania

== Other uses ==
- Martz Communications Group, an American radio broadcasting company
- Martz Group, an American bus company

== See also ==
- Marz (disambiguation)
