= Marz (surname) =

Marz or März is a German surname. Notable people with the surname include:

- Heiko März (born 1965), German footballer
- Jonas Marz (born 1989), German footballer
- Kurt Marz (1924–20??), Austrian rower
- Richard Marz (born 1944), Canadian politician
- Ron Marz (born 1965), American comic book writer
- Roswitha März (born 1940), German mathematician and writer
- Tommy Marz (born ?), American singer-songwriter and guitarist
- Tyler Marz (born 1992), American football player

== See also ==
- Marz (rapper) (born ?), Croatian-born American rapper
- Marz Lovejoy (born ?), American hip hop musician and rapper
- Martz (surname), a similarly spelled surname
