= Drift & Die =

Single by Puddle of Mudd

from the album Stuck and Come Clean
- Released: April 15, 2002
- Genre: Rock
- Length: 4:25 (album version); 4:04 (radio edit)
- Label: Flawless; Geffen
- Songwriters: Wes Scantlin; Jimmy Allen

Puddle of Mudd singles chronology
"Blurry" (2001)	"Drift & Die" (2002)	"She Hates Me" (2002)

Music video
- "Drift & Die" on YouTube

"Drift & Die" is a song by the American rock band Puddle of Mudd, released as the third single from their second studio album, Come Clean, in 2002. The song previously appeared on their 1994 EP, Stuck, released as a single locally. "Drift & Die" spent six weeks at number one on the US Billboard Mainstream Rock Tracks chart in mid-2002.

== Music video ==
Music video set in Los Angeles, one of the band members practicing, rehearsing for musical concert, last moment shown on the roof top helipad of US Bank Tower with the view of LA.

== Charts ==
=== Weekly charts ===
Weekly chart performance for "Drift & Die"
Chart (2002)	Peak position
Canada (Nielsen BDS)	35
US Billboard Hot 100	61
US Alternative Airplay (Billboard)	3
US Mainstream Rock (Billboard)	1

=== Year-end charts ===
Year-end chart performance for "Drift & Die"
Chart (2002)	Position
US Mainstream Rock Tracks (Billboard)	7
US Modern Rock Tracks (Billboard)	17
