= Martz (surname) =

Martz is a surname. It may refer to:

- Andrew Martz (1924–2002), Russian sculptor
- Austin Martz (born 1992), American soccer player
- Charles S. Martz (1903–1966), American photographer, painter, inventor, and entrepreneur
- Clyde O. Martz (1920–2010), American attorney and politician
- Edward Ralph Martz (1930–2007), American actor
- Edwin P. Martz (1916–1967), American physicist and astronomer
- Gary Martz (born 1951), American baseball player
- Hendrik Martz (born 1968), German actor
- Íngrid Martz (born 1979), Mexican actor and model
- Jasun Martz (born 1953), American musician and artist
- Jennifer Martz (born 1977), American volleyball player
- Joe Martz (born ?), American politician and civil servant
- Judy Martz (1943–2017), American politician, businesswoman, and speed skater
- Karl Martz (1912–1997), American studio potter, ceramist, and teacher
- Louis L. Martz (1913–2001), American English literature professor, library director, and writer
- Mike Martz (born 1951), American football coach
- Randy Martz (born 1956), American baseball player and coach
- William Martz (1945–1983), American chess master

== See also ==
- Marz (surname), a similarly spelled surname
