= She Hates Me =

2002 single by Puddle of Mudd

Single by Puddle of Mudd

from the album Come Clean
- B-side: "Nobody Told Me" (live); "Blurry" (live)
- Released: July 29, 2002
- Genre: Post-grunge; nu metal
- Length: 3:36
- Label: Flawless; Geffen
- Songwriters: Wes Scantlin; Jimmy Allen
- Producer: John Kurzweg

Puddle of Mudd singles chronology
"Drift & Die" (2002)	"She Hates Me" (2002)	"Away from Me" (2003)

Music video
- "She Hates Me" on YouTube

"She Hates Me", originally titled "She Fucking Hates Me", is a song by the American rock band Puddle of Mudd. It was included on the band's major-label debut studio album, Come Clean (2001), and was released as the album's fourth and final single by Flawless and Geffen Records on July 29, 2002.

The song continued the group's popularity on the Billboard Hot 100, peaking at number 13, becoming the band's second highest entry behind "Blurry", which peaked within the chart's top five. It also topped the Billboard Mainstream Rock Tracks chart for one week in October. The popularity of "She Hates Me" made it become Puddle of Mudd's second single to sell over 500,000 copies in the United States, following "Blurry". The song also reached the top 10 in Australia, Austria, and Ireland while peaking at number 14 on the UK Singles Chart, making it the group's third top 20 hit. It won a 2004 ASCAP Pop Music Award.

== Composition ==
Puddle of Mudd lead guitarist Jimmy Allen had just ended a relationship and was inspired to write a song to reflect his ex-girlfriend's anger. Considered a post-grunge and nu metal song, "She Hates Me" ironically combines upbeat music with lyrics about the break-up. The chord progression is similar to the main chord progression in the 1983 Suicidal Tendencies song "I Saw Your Mommy", which led to accusations that Puddle of Mudd plagiarized the song. It also shares chords and melodies with the song "Summer Nights" from the 1971 musical Grease, and the band has sometimes performed "She Hates Me" as a medley with that song during their concerts.

In the album's insert is a photocopy of each song's original handwritten lyrics, which displays the original name of the song as "She Fucking Hates Me". The title was changed to make it more acceptable to the public, though the line is still heard in its original form in the unedited version of the song.

== Music video ==
The music video was directed by Marc Webb. It features members of the band and film crew playing a group of characters who all lip sync to the song, such as a high school student, a janitor, and a fast food cook. This is interspersed with shots of the band playing the song in the street. As the song gets louder and more distorted, the characters get more aggressive and violent towards those around them.

== Track listings ==
UK CD1

1. "She Hates Me" (explicit) – 3:36
2. "Nobody Told Me" (live) – 5:40
3. "Blurry" (live) – 5:02
4. "She Hates Me" (video)

UK CD2

1. "She Hates Me" (album version) – 3:36
2. "Nobody Told Me" (acoustic live) – 5:04
3. "Blurry" (acoustic live) – 4:11

UK cassette single

1. "She Hates Me" (clean version)
2. "Nobody Told Me" (live version)

European CD single

1. "She Hates Me" (album version)
2. "Nobody Told Me" (live from Pittsburgh)

Australian CD single

1. "She Hates Me" (album version)
2. "Nobody Told Me" (live from Pittsburgh)
3. "Blurry" (live from Pittsburgh)

== Charts ==
=== Weekly charts ===
Weekly chart performance for "She Hates Me"
Chart (2002–2003)	Peak position
Australia (ARIA)	9
Austria (Ö3 Austria Top 40)	7
Belgium (Ultratop 50 Flanders)	25
Europe (Eurochart Hot 100)	22
Germany (GfK)	20
Ireland (IRMA)	8
Italy (FIMI)	37
Netherlands (Dutch Top 40)	38
Netherlands (Single Top 100)	37
New Zealand (Recorded Music NZ)	49
Scottish Singles Sales (Official Charts)	10
Sweden (Sverigetopplistan)	45
Switzerland (Schweizer Hitparade)	23
UK Singles (Official Charts)	14
UK Rock & Metal (Official Charts)	1
US Billboard Hot 100	13
US Adult Pop Airplay (Billboard)	30
US Alternative Airplay (Billboard)	2
US Mainstream Rock (Billboard)	1
US Pop Airplay (Billboard)	7

=== Year-end charts ===
2002 year-end chart performance for "She Hates Me"
Chart (2002)	Position
Ireland (IRMA)	64
US Modern Rock Tracks (Billboard)	28

2003 year-end chart performance for "She Hates Me"
Chart (2003)	Position
Australia (ARIA)	40
US Billboard Hot 100	70
US Adult Top 40 (Billboard)	68
US Mainstream Top 40 (Billboard)	27
US Modern Rock Tracks (Billboard)	54

== Certifications ==
Certifications for "She Hates Me"
Region	Certification	Certified units/sales
Australia (ARIA)	Gold	35,000^{^}
New Zealand (RMNZ)	Platinum	30,000^{‡}
United Kingdom (BPI)	Gold	400,000^{‡}
^{^} Shipments figures based on certification alone.^{‡} Sales+streaming figures based on certification alone.

== Release history ==
Release dates and formats for "She Hates Me"
Region	Date	Format(s)	Label(s)	Ref.
United States	July 29, 2002	Mainstream rock; active rock; alternative radio	Flawless; Geffen	
United Kingdom	September 16, 2002	CD	Flawless; Geffen	
United States	October 7, 2002	Contemporary hit radio	Flawless; Geffen	
