= Come Clean (Puddle of Mudd album) =

Studio album by Puddle of Mudd
- Released: August 28, 2001
- Recorded: 2000–2001
- Studio: Third Stone Recording (Woodland Hills, California); NRG Recording Studios (North Hollywood, California)
- Genre: Post-grunge; nu metal
- Length: 48:14
- Label: Flawless; Geffen
- Producer: John Kurzweg

Puddle of Mudd chronology
Abrasive (1997)	Come Clean (2001)	Life on Display (2003)

Singles from Come Clean
- 1. "Control" Released: July 17, 2001; 2. "Blurry" Released: October 29, 2001; 3. "Drift & Die" Released: April 23, 2002; 4. "She Hates Me" Released: August 13, 2002

Come Clean is the second studio album and major label debut by the American rock band Puddle of Mudd. It was released on August 28, 2001, through Flawless Records. The album broke Puddle of Mudd into the mainstream, featuring the singles "Control", "Blurry", "Drift & Die" and "She Hates Me". Various tracks were re-recorded from the band's previous releases, Stuck and Abrasive.

Come Clean was the band's biggest hit on the US Billboard 200, peaking at number nine. The album has sold over 5,000,000 copies and was certified 3× Platinum by the RIAA.

== Music ==
The vocals have drawn comparisons to Nirvana frontman Kurt Cobain, "but with a bit more sneer," according to Lauryn Schaffner of Loudwire. She described the album's instrumentation as "certainly a bit sludgier than Nirvana". The album contains hooks.

== Reception and legacy ==
Professional ratings
Review scores
Source	Rating
AllMusic	2.5/5 stars
Drowned in Sound	6/10
Entertainment Weekly	C
NME	2.5/5 stars
Rolling Stone	2.5/5 stars

Come Clean received mixed reviews from critics. AllMusic and Rolling Stone said that Puddle of Mudd did not stand out from other post-grunge bands with this album. In contrast, Stephanie Dickison of PopMatters touted Come Clean as the band's "album of the year". In 2014, Tom Hawking of Flavorwire included the album in his list of "The 50 Worst Albums Ever Made", in which he said: "Sadly, grunge led straight to post-grunge, a genre that retained grunge’s guitar sound and jettisoned everything else that made it special. The result was torpid pseudo-grunge made by the sort of bros who Cobain would have loathed. Like this album, for instance." In 2025, Lauryn Schaffner of Loudwire said it was the band's best album, saying: "Though they've released six other albums since, Puddle of Mudd never surpassed the success they had with Come Clean, making it the best offering of their catalog."

== Track listing ==
All tracks written by Wes Scantlin except where noted.

No.	Title	Writer(s)	Length
1.	"Control"	Scantlin; Brad Stewart	3:49
2.	"Drift & Die"	Scantlin; Jimmy Allen	4:25
3.	"Out of My Head"		3:43
4.	"Nobody Told Me"		5:22
5.	"Blurry"	Scantlin; Doug Ardito; Allen	5:04
6.	"She Hates Me"	Scantlin; Allen	3:37
7.	"Bring Me Down"		4:03
8.	"Never Change"	Scantlin; Ardito	3:59
9.	"Basement"		4:22
10.	"Said"		4:08
11.	"Piss It All Away"		5:39
Total length:			48:11

Bonus tracks
No.	Title	Writer(s)	Length
12.	"Abrasive"	Scantlin; Allen; Troy McCoy	3:14
13.	"Control (Acoustic)"	Scantlin; Stewart	4:09

== Personnel ==
=== Puddle of Mudd ===
- Wes Scantlin – lead vocals, guitars
- Paul Phillips – guitars
- Doug Ardito – bass guitar, backing vocals
- Greg Upchurch – drums (credit only), backing vocals

=== Additional personnel ===
- Josh Freese – drums (uncredited)
- John Kurzweg - producer, engineer
- Andy Wallace – mixing
- Scott Sisco - assistant mixing engineer
- Scott Francisco, Steve Mixdorf - recording engineer
- Bobby Selvaggio - digital editing (Pro Tools)
- Vlado Meller - mastering
- Steve Twigger – string arrangements (track 11)
- Kate Schermerhorn – cover photo

==== A&R / Coordinators ====
- Fred Durst – A&R
- Danny Wimmer – A&R Coordinator
- Les Scurry – Production Coordinator

== Charts ==
=== Weekly charts ===
Weekly chart performance for Come Clean
Chart (2002–2003)	Peak position
Australian Albums (ARIA)	23
Australian Heavy Rock & Metal Albums (ARIA)	2
Austrian Albums (Ö3 Austria)	8
Belgian Albums (Ultratop Flanders)	26
Belgian Alternative Albums (Ultratop Flanders)	14
Canadian Albums (Nielsen SoundScan)	31
Dutch Albums (Album Top 100)	53
European Albums (Music & Media)	22
Finnish Albums (Suomen virallinen lista)	27
French Albums (SNEP)	82
German Albums (Offizielle Top 100)	10
Irish Albums (IRMA)	15
Italian Albums (FIMI)	26
New Zealand Albums (RMNZ)	10
Scottish Albums (Official Charts)	12
Swedish Albums (Sverigetopplistan)	52
Swiss Albums (Schweizer Hitparade)	26
UK Albums (Official Charts)	12
UK Rock & Metal Albums (Official Charts)	2
US Billboard 200	9

=== Year-end charts ===
2002 year-end chart performance for Come Clean
Chart (2002)	Position
Austrian Albums (Ö3 Austria)	31
Canadian Albums (Nielsen SoundScan)	55
Canadian Alternative Albums (Nielsen SoundScan)	16
Canadian Metal Albums (Nielsen SoundScan)	9
European Albums (Music & Media)	58
German Albums (Offizielle Top 100)	32
Swiss Albums (Schweizer Hitparade)	96
UK Albums (OCC)	60
US Billboard 200	24
Worldwide Albums (IFPI)	32

2003 year-end chart performance for Come Clean
Chart (2003)	Position
US Billboard 200	114

=== Decade-end charts ===
Decade-end chart performance for Come Clean
Chart (2000–2009)	Position
US Billboard 200	91

== Certifications ==
Certifications for Come Clean
Region	Certification	Certified units/sales
Australia (ARIA)	Gold	35,000^{^}
Canada (Music Canada)	Platinum	100,000^{^}
Germany (BVMI)	Gold	150,000^{^}
New Zealand (RMNZ)	Gold	7,500^{^}
Switzerland (IFPI Switzerland)	Gold	20,000^{^}
United Kingdom (BPI)	Platinum	300,000^{^}
United States (RIAA)	3× Platinum	3,000,000^{^}
^{^} Shipments figures based on certification alone.
