= Roswitha März =

German mathematician

Roswitha März (born October 15, 1940) is a German mathematician known for her research on differential-algebraic systems of equations. She is a professor emeritus of mathematics at the Humboldt University of Berlin.

== Education and career ==
März was born on October 15, 1940, in Varnsdorf, now part of the Czech Republic. Beginning in 1960 she studied mathematics at the University of Leningrad, now Saint Petersburg State University, earning a diploma in 1965. She earned a doctorate (Dr. sc. nat.) from the Chemnitz University of Technology in 1970. Her dissertation, Interpolation mit Parameteroptimierung, was supervised by Frieder Kuhnert.

She worked at the Humboldt University of Berlin beginning in 1968, first as a researcher and later as a faculty member, serving as dean of the mathematics faculty from 1990 to 1991 and becoming University Professor in 1992.

== Books ==
März is the author or coauthor of books including:

- The Common Ground of DAE Approaches: An overview of diverse DAE frameworks emphasizing their commonalities (with Diana Estévez Schwarz and René Lamour, DAE Panel, 3, https://doi.org/10.52825/dae-p.v3i.2547, 2025)
- Differential-algebraic equations: a projector based analysis (with René Lamour and Caren Tischendorf, Springer, 2013)
- Differential-algebraic equations and their numerical treatment (with Eberhard Griepentrog, Teubner, 1986)
- Parametric multistep methods (Humboldt University, 1979)
