= Morz =

Morz or Mörz may refer to:

- Michael Mörz (born 1980), an Austrian footballer
- Morz, Fars, a village in Fars province, Iran
