= Control (Puddle of Mudd song) =

2001 single by Puddle of Mudd

Single by Puddle of Mudd

from the album Come Clean
- Released: July 17, 2001
- Genre: Alternative metal; hard rock; nu metal
- Length: 3:49
- Label: Flawless; Geffen
- Songwriters: Wes Scantlin; Brad Stewart
- Producer: John Kurzweg

Puddle of Mudd singles chronology
"Nobody Told Me" (1997)	"Control" (2001)	"Blurry" (2001)

Music video
- "Control" on YouTube

"Control" is a song by the American rock band Puddle of Mudd, released by Geffen Records on July 17, 2001, as their debut single. It was written by Wes Scantlin and Brad Stewart, as the lead single from the band's debut studio album, Come Clean. The song peaked at number three on both the US Billboard Mainstream Rock Tracks and Modern Rock Tracks charts. Furthermore, it peaked at number 68 on the Billboard Hot 100. The song was used for WWF Survivor Series in 2001.

== Meaning and background ==
"Control" is about a relationship that Puddle of Mudd member Wes Scantlin was in. Scantlin told MTV that he was "going out with an uncontrollable person" and said that he was uncontrollable, too. Scantlin then told MTV:

But the intimacy was really, really good ... [There were] some freaky-deaky things going on. The end of the song is the wake-up [where you realize], "Man, I can't deal with this anymore." The mental frustration isn't worth the bonus that you get intimacy-wise. When I wrote those lyrics, I was going, "Ah, man, I don't know if the record company's going to let this fly." I didn't know what anybody in the band was going to think.

Brad Stewart, future bassist of Shinedown, wrote the main riff during a jam session, which inspired Scantlin to rework the rhythm and lyrics from a song he had written called "Hate Sex" into "Control".

== Music video ==
The music video starts with a segment of Wes Scantlin being kicked out from a truck after he had been arguing with a girl who was driving. As a result, the band are late to a gig at a local bar. The majority of the video cuts between Scantlin walking to the venue, the driver driving away from him, and the band performing at the bar. Towards the bridge of the song, Scantlin finds the girl again, who has pulled over to the side of the road. The two pretend to make up, but as the two embrace, Scantlin pickpockets the woman of her keys. As the final chorus comes in, Scantlin throws her keys into a puddle of mud, a pun on the band's name.

== Single ==
=== Track listings ===
Europe enhanced single (2001)

No.	Title	Length
1.	"Control" (album version)	3:50
2.	"Control" (acoustic version) (Brad Stewart, Wesley Scantlin)	4:09
3.	"Control" (video) (directed by Fred Durst)	4:40
Total length:		12:03

Australian enhanced single (2001)

No.	Title	Length
1.	"Control" (album version)	3:50
2.	"Control" (acoustic version)	4:09
3.	"Never Change" (album version) (Scantlin)	3:59
4.	"Control" (video)	4:40
Total length:		16:37

UK enhanced single (2002)

No.	Title	Length
1.	"Control" (album version)	3:50
2.	"Abrasive" (non-LP track) (Scantlin, from Abrasive album)	3:14
3.	"Control" (acoustic version)	4:09
4.	"Control" (video)	4:40
Total length:		15:17

UK 7-inch brown vinyl

Side A
No.	Title	Length
1.	"Control" (album version)	3:50

Side B
No.	Title	Length
1.	"Abrasive" (non-LP track)	3:14

Europe enhanced maxi-single (2002)

No.	Title	Length
1.	"Control" (album version)	3:50
2.	"Control" (acoustic version)	4:09
3.	"Abrasive" (non-LP track)	3:14
4.	"Control" (video)	4:40
Total length:		15:17

== Charts ==
=== Weekly charts ===
Weekly chart performance for "Control"
Chart (2001–2002)	Peak position
Australia (ARIA)	54
Europe (Eurochart Hot 100)	64
Germany (GfK)	44
Ireland (IRMA)	30
Scottish Singles Sales (Official Charts)	14
Switzerland (Schweizer Hitparade)	84
UK Singles (Official Charts)	15
UK Rock & Metal (Official Charts)	1
US Billboard Hot 100	68
US Alternative Airplay (Billboard)	3
US Mainstream Rock (Billboard)	3

=== Year-end charts ===
2001 year-end chart performance for "Control"
Chart (2001)	Position
US Mainstream Rock Tracks (Billboard)	14
US Modern Rock Tracks (Billboard)	16

2002 year-end chart performance for "Control"
Chart (2002)	Position
US Modern Rock Tracks (Billboard)	82

== Certifications ==
Region	Certification	Certified units/sales
New Zealand (RMNZ)	Gold	15,000^{‡}
^{‡} Sales+streaming figures based on certification alone.

== Release history ==
Release dates and formats for "Control"
Region	Date	Format(s)	Label(s)	Ref.
United States	July 17, 2001	Alternative radio	Flawless; Geffen	
Australia	October 29, 2001	CD	Flawless; Geffen	
United Kingdom	February 11, 2002	7-inch vinyl; CD; cassette	Flawless; Geffen	
