= Martz Rock Shelters =

Archaeological site in Pennsylvanie, U.S.

The Martz Rock Shelters was an archaeological site located near Myersdale, Somerset County, Pennsylvania, US, on the farm of Harry Martz. The Somerset County Archaeological Survey began its excavations on June 14, 1938, and was completed six days later. The site was located about 30 miles from Metropolitan Pittsburgh. The site was discovered around 1938 during the Works Projects Administration excavation project, necessary for the construction of state highway 219. It was located at a hill overlooking the Casselman River from which a shale ledge protruded about two hundred and fifty feet above the river. The opening of the caves faced south. The site was destroyed during the construction of the highway.

Artifacts found at the site included:

- charcoal and ash
- flint, chert and quartz spalls
- animal bones
- projectile points
- potsherds
- scrapers

Chert and quartz are not naturally found in Somerset County.

== Findings ==
The deposition was found to be thirty-six inches in depth. Local knowledge of the site attributes the occupation to Native Americans. The excavation confirmed that the site was occupied as early as other sites located in eastern parts of Pennsylvania. The site indicates that the settlement was occupied by a subsistence based group. Characteristics of subsistence settlements were dependence on maize, villages that were located above the river floodplain and the use of underground storage.
