= Tommy Marz =

American singer-songwriter

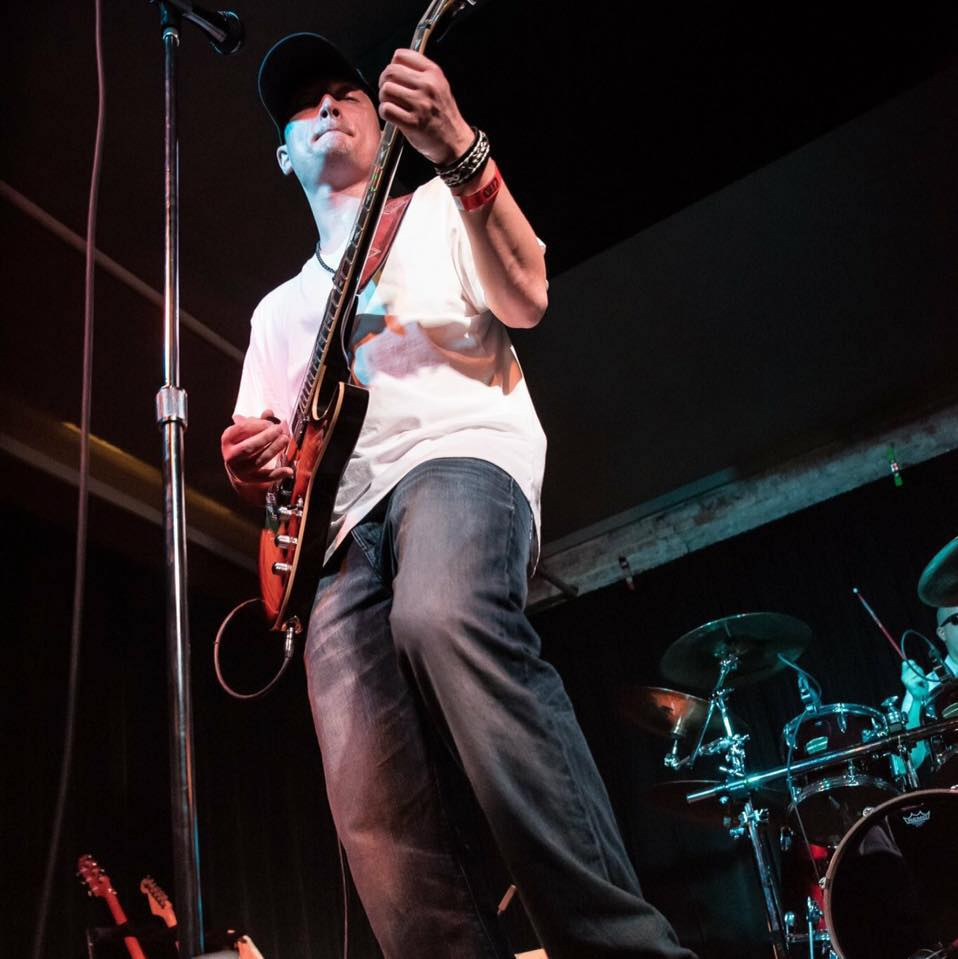
- Tommy Marz performing at the Crofoot in Pontiac Michigan on December 5, 2015

Background information
- Genres: Rock, singer-songwriter
- Occupation: Singer-songwriter
- Instruments: Vocals, guitar
- Years active: 2004–present
- Label: Stagefiend
- Website: tommymarzband.com,soundvapors.com

Tommy Marz is an American singer-songwriter, guitarist and founder of the Tommy Marz Band.

Marz started playing drums at the age of 10 and was a member of the Detroit-based Ann Arbor Trail Marching Band Drum Line. He formed the rock band Go to Zero in 2004 as the band's front man and guitar player. In 2011, he released a cover version of George Michael's song "Faith". After George Michael retweeted the cover video to his followers, Marz's video went on to garner more than 100,000 views on YouTube. After having musical appearances on two episodes of Last Call with Carson Daly, he formed the rock trio the Tommy Marz Band along with drummer Jason Tucker and bassist Chris Alef. The band once again featured Marz on vocals and guitar. The band spent the years of 2012–2018 touring with bands and artists such as Scott Stapp, Great White, The Dan Band, Fuel and Scott Weiland. On June 21, 2019, Marz released a collaboration with P.M. Dawn on a cover of the Puddle of Mudd hit, "Blurry".

Marz took part in the For the Crew virtual show hosted by Smashing Pumpkins guitarist and keyboardist Jeff Schroeder, which was streamed on March 6, 2021. Since that time Tommy and Jeff have collaborated on two singles called "15" and "Never Look Back".

== Music ==
Marz has released two albums with the Tommy Marz Band, Bringing Alpha and Seventy One Trips Around the Sun. ESPN writer Brian Campbell said about Bringing Alpha, "While 'Bringing The Alpha' is far from a concept album, there's a context of unity to each track that binds the music together. With a total run time of just over 30 minutes, part of the album's charm is that it doesn't belabor or linger; instead it leaves you wanting more – not just from each one of the album's standout tracks, but from the songwriter himself." Eric Heemsoth of National Rock Review gave his opinion on the band's second album: "As impressive as their debut album, Bringing Alpha and Seventy-One trips Around the Sun are masterpieces of songwriting, instrumentation, overall recording, producing, mixing and mastering. Not sure if credit goes to the recording studio, the producer, the mixer, or even just to the band themselves, but Seventy-One Trips has so many layers to it waiting to be peeled away. Each song is like a beautiful plump head of lettuce; each time you listen to it, you peel away a layer discovering a new one in its place."

Marz released the six-song EP Chasing Light on September 23, 2020. It includes a cover of the Stealers Wheel song, "Stuck in the Middle with You".

== This Wild Darkness ==
In August of 2024, Online music magazine Brave Words & Bloody Knuckles announced a new rock supergroup called This Wild Darkness. The collection of artists include singer-songwriter Tommy Marz, Skid Row guitarist Scotti Hill, Former Smashing Pumpkins guitarist Jeff Schroeder, Lady A guitarist Slim Gambill, Wang Chung frontman Jack Hues, former Third Eye Blind bassist Arion Salazar and Sturgill Simpson bassist Chuck Bartels.

Marz formed the project after writing a song that he felt needed a slide guitar. Tommy asked Scotti Hill if he played slide guitar and after he said that he did, Tommy asked if he wanted to play slide on it. The two agreed to work together and the project grew into a full EP shortly after. The album entitled "The Notorious Memphis Rains" debut on the Billboard Blues Album Chart at number 4.

== Sound Vapors ==
In March 2018, Marz started the Sound Vapors website. The music site includes interviews with artists, industry professionals and album reviews. In November 2018, he started a music interview podcast. Past episodes include interviews with Kenny Wayne Shepherd, William DuVall of Alice In Chains, Wes Scantlin of Puddle of Mudd, Chris Shiflett of Foo Fighters, Black Stone Cherry, Theory of a Deadman and Tiffany.

== Discography ==
List of charting singles
Title	Year	Peak chart positions	
Title	Year	US AC	US Dance/Elec. Dig.
"15" (featuring Jeff Schroeder and Electropoint)	2022	25	25
"Never Look Back" (featuring Jeff Schroeder, Caitlin Evanson and Electropoint)	2023	21	15

With This Wild Darkness
Year	Album details	Peak chart positions
Year	Album details	US Blues
2024	The Notorious Memphis Rains: Released: October 25, 2024; Label: Kiril/KMG; Formats: Vinyl, digital download	4
