= Joe Martz =

American chief executive officer and chairman of the board of directors

Joseph S. Martz, also known as Joe Martz, is an American chief executive officer and chairman of the board of directors, who currently heads the Philadelphia-based Merakey, a non-profit provider of community-based human and special education services.

== Formative years ==
Martz holds a Bachelor of Science degree in finance from Pennsylvania State University and a Master of Business Administration degree from St. Joseph's University.

== Career ==
Under Governor Edward G. Rendell, Martz served as secretary of the Pennsylvania Office of Administration, a position he held from 2005 to 2007, where he led a statewide series of productivity initiatives that generated more than $100 million in savings and increased productivity. Before that, Martz served as managing director of the City of Philadelphia, where he oversaw a workforce of 20,000 people and an annual operating budget of $2.75 billion. Appointed by Mayor Edward G. Rendell as chief operating officer in 2000, he oversaw the day-to-day operations of the city's thirteen operating departments.

His public career also includes service as the deputy commissioner of public property and first deputy managing director of the city.

In the private sector, Martz was senior vice president and managing director of the Government Solutions Division of ACS Corporation, which during his tenure grew to be the largest information technology and business process outsourcing (BPO) organization serving local governments in North America. Martz previously led the PRWT Services, Inc.'s red light camera and photo radar enforcement operations, parking and moving violations processing and collection services, emergency medical services billing and collection operations and parking management consulting to cities nationwide and abroad.

He serves as an executive director of Girard Estate Trust, director of the American Red Cross Southeastern Pennsylvania Chapter, and has been director of the Philadelphia Convention & Visitors Bureau since December 2007.
