= Blurry =

2001 single by Puddle of Mudd

Single by Puddle of Mudd

from the album Come Clean
- Released: October 16, 2001
- Recorded: Late 2000
- Genre: Post-grunge; alternative rock
- Length: 5:04 (album version); 4:17 (radio and video version)
- Label: Flawless; Geffen
- Songwriters: Wes Scantlin; Doug Ardito; Jimmy Allen
- Producers: John Kurzweg; Puddle of Mudd

Puddle of Mudd singles chronology
"Control" (2001)	"Blurry" (2001)	"Drift & Die" (2002)

Music video
- "Blurry" on YouTube

"Blurry" is a song by the American rock band Puddle of Mudd. It was released on October 16, 2001, as the second single from the band's debut album Come Clean (2001). It was 2002's most successful rock song in the United States, topping the Billboard Mainstream Rock and Modern Rock Tracks charts as well as their year-end listings. "Blurry" also found success outside the US, reaching the top 20 in Ireland, New Zealand, and the United Kingdom. In 2024, the staff of Consequence included the song in their list of "50 Kick-Butt Post-Grunge Songs We Can Get Behind".

== Background ==
Puddle of Mudd played small shows in the Kansas City area for most of the 1990s with little mainstream success. However, singer Wes Scantlin got a demo tape to Limp Bizkit singer Fred Durst when Limp Bizkit were in town on October 12, 1999, on the Family Values Tour, and Durst's label Flawless Records signed him to a recording contract. Unimpressed with Scantlin's bandmates, Flawless Records scrapped them all, rebuilt the group with musicians Scantlin had never seen before, and flew him out to Los Angeles in late 2000 to record with them. He spent his days fiddling with his acoustic guitar in a hotel room on Hollywood Boulevard, where he reworked a previous Puddle of Mudd song called "Electron Moon" into "Blurry".

“’Blurry’ was basically about being flown to freaking Los Angeles and y’know, I didn't have any friends so they had put me into a hotel room,” Scantlin told American Songwriter. “I didn't know anybody at all. And I was just missing my family and son, I missed my grandma and stuff.”

== Composition ==
"Blurry" is a post-grunge and alternative rock song, written in the key of E♭ minor with a moderately slow tempo of 78 beats per minute. The song follows a chord progression of C♭–D♭–E♭m, and the vocals in the song span from D♭_{3} to A♭_{4}.

== Commercial performance ==
"Blurry" is Puddle of Mudd's most successful song, reaching the number-one spot on the Billboard Hot Mainstream Rock Tracks and Hot Modern Rock Tracks charts for 10 and nine weeks, respectively. This soon propelled the single to mainstream success, reaching the number five spot on both the Billboard Hot 100 Airplay and Billboard Hot 100 and number three on the Pop Songs chart. "Blurry" was the eighth-most played song on radio in Canada in 2002. The song is also the band's highest selling U.S. single ever, with sales of 753,000 copies, as of 2010. Additionally, the song's writers, Wes Scantlin, Doug Ardito, and Jimmy Allen, won ASCAP (American Society of Composers, Authors and Publishers) Song of the Year and Pop Song of the Year for this tune. "Blurry" also won two Billboard Awards in 2002, for Modern Rock Track of the Year and Rock Track of the Year. It also received the Kerrang! Award for Best Single. "Blurry" reached number eight on the UK Singles Chart on its release there in June 2002, becoming the band's highest-charting single in the United Kingdom.

== Music video ==
The video was directed by Limp Bizkit vocalist Fred Durst. The video shows Scantlin playing with his son Jordan, interspersed with shots of the band playing in a garage. Towards the end of the video, a man and a woman (presumably Jordan's mother and stepfather) are shown driving away with Jordan in the back seat as Wes watches sadly.

== Accolades ==
Accolades for "Blurry"
Publication	Region	Accolade	Year	Rank
AOL Radio	United States	"Top Alternative Songs of the Decade – 2000s"	2009	3

== Track listings ==
Australian CD single

1. "Blurry" (radio edit)
2. "Abrasive"
3. "Nobody Told Me"

European CD single

1. "Blurry" (album version)
2. "All I Ask For"

UK cassette single

1. "Blurry"
2. "All I Ask For" (demo)

UK CD1

1. "Blurry"
2. "All I Ask For" (demo)
3. "Out of My Head" (live)
4. "Blurry" (video)

UK CD2

1. "Blurry"
2. "Control" (live)
3. "Bring Me Down" (live)

== Charts ==
=== Weekly charts ===
Weekly chart performance for "Blurry"
Chart (2001–2002)	Peak position
Australia (ARIA)	52
Canada Radio (Nielsen BDS)	2
Canada CHR (Nielsen BDS)	8
Europe (Eurochart Hot 100)	30
European Radio Top 50 (Music & Media)	41
France (SNEP)	74
Germany (GfK)	44
Ireland (IRMA)	18
Italy (FIMI)	37
Netherlands (Dutch Top 40 Tipparade)	15
Netherlands (Single Top 100)	98
New Zealand (Recorded Music NZ)	9
Scottish Singles Sales (Official Charts)	7
Switzerland (Schweizer Hitparade)	72
UK Singles (Official Charts)	8
UK Independent (Official Charts)	12
UK Rock & Metal (Official Charts)	1
US Billboard Hot 100	5
US Adult Pop Airplay (Billboard)	6
US Alternative Airplay (Billboard)	1
US Mainstream Rock Airplay (Billboard)	1
US Pop Airplay (Billboard)	3
US Top 40 Tracks (Billboard)	6

=== Year-end charts ===
Year-end chart performance for "Blurry"
Chart (2002)	Position
Canada Radio (Nielsen BDS)	8
UK Singles (OCC)	136
US Billboard Hot 100	10
US Adult Top 40 (Billboard)	14
US Mainstream Rock Tracks (Billboard)	1
US Mainstream Top 40 (Billboard)	14
US Modern Rock Tracks (Billboard)	1
US Top 40 Tracks (Billboard)	18

=== Decade-end charts ===
Decade-end chart performance for "Blurry"
Chart (2000–2009)	Position
US Hot Alternative Songs (Billboard)	7
US Hot Rock Songs (Billboard)	4

== Certifications ==
Certifications and sales for "Blurry"
Region	Certification	Certified units/sales
New Zealand (RMNZ)	2× Platinum	60,000^{‡}
United Kingdom (BPI)	Gold	400,000^{‡}
^{‡} Sales+streaming figures based on certification alone.

== Release history ==
Release dates and formats for "Blurry"
Region	Date	Format(s)	Label(s)	Ref.
United States	October 16, 2001	Mainstream rock; active rock; alternative radio	Flawless; Geffen	
Australia	April 1, 2002	CD	Flawless; Geffen	
United Kingdom	June 3, 2002	CD; cassette	Flawless; Geffen	

== Covers ==
- P.M. Dawn appeared on NBC's Hit Me, Baby, One More Time, performing "Set Adrift on Memory Bliss", and covered Puddle of Mudd's "Blurry". Despite the fact that Prince Be was still suffering the effects of this stroke, they beat Animotion, Missing Persons, Juice Newton and Shannon to claim the $20,000 charitable prize, which they contributed to the Juvenile Diabetes Research Foundation, as Prince Be was a diabetic. In June 2019, P.M. Dawn collaborated with musician Tommy Marz on a studio version of Blurry dedicated to the memory of Attrell Cordes
- On May 21, 2021, country rock singer-songwriter Hardy released a cover of "Blurry" with an accompanying music video on YouTube.

== Uses in media ==
- This song is used as the title theme for the video game Ace Combat 5: The Unsung War.
- This song is used in the trailer for the 2003 film A Man Apart.
- On June 21, 2011, this song was released as downloadable content for the rhythm game Rock Band 3.
