= Peter Landesman =

American film director

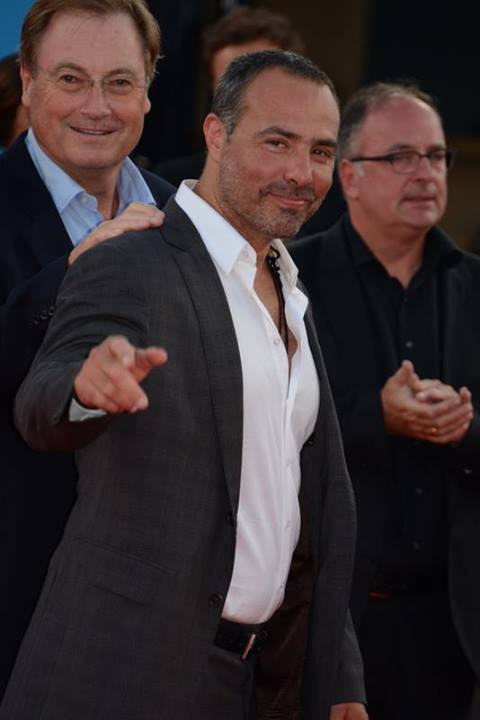
- Landesman at the 2013 Deauville Film Festival
- Born: January 3, 1965 (age 61); New York City, New York, US
- Occupations: Screenwriter, film director, producer, journalist, novelist, painter
- Known for: Concussion (feature film); The Girls Next Door (article)

Peter Landesman (born January 3, 1965) is an American screenwriter, film director, producer, journalist, novelist and painter. He wrote a number of cover stories for The New York Times Magazine, The New Yorker, The Atlantic Monthly and others, including investigations into global arms trafficking, sex trafficking, refugee trafficking, the Rwandan genocide, and the creation and smuggling of forged and stolen art and antiquities. He also reported from the conflicts in Kosovo, Rwanda, and Pakistan and Afghanistan post-9/11.

As a filmmaker, he wrote and directed the biographical films Parkland (2013), Concussion (2015) and Mark Felt: The Man Who Brought Down the White House (2017).

== Career ==
Landesman wrote his first fiction book The Raven, which was published in 1995, for which he won the American Academy of Arts and Letters Sue Kaufman Prize for First Fiction.

Landesman's article The Girls Next Door about sex slaves and the trafficking of young and often underage girls into and through the United States, was featured as the cover story in the January 24, 2004 issue of The New York Times Magazine. Daniel Radosh had a public dispute with Landesman, when Radosh challenged the facts of the article. A series of articles about the dispute by Jack Shafer in the magazine Slate turned the issue of the article's accuracy into one of the most controversial topics in journalism during the first half of 2004. The details of the expose were challenged. That piece triggered a national conversation on sex trafficking in this country, and, notwithstanding the controversy over Landesman's accuracy, won Landesman his second Overseas Press Club Award, this one for Best Human Rights Reporting. The article was adapted into a film, Trade, which deals with human trafficking out of Mexico and a brother's attempt to rescue his kidnapped young sister. The film was released in 2007.

In his debut, Landesman wrote and directed the historical film Parkland, based on the book Four Days in November: The Assassination of President John F. Kennedy, by Vincent Bugliosi. The film is about the chaotic events that occurred at Parkland Hospital in Dallas, Texas on the day President John F. Kennedy was assassinated on November 22, 1963. James Badge Dale and Zac Efron starred in the film, which was released in 2013.

Landesman also wrote the script of a 2014 thriller film Kill the Messenger, a true story about a journalist Gary Webb, based on two books Kill the Messenger by Nick Schou and Dark Alliance by Webb. The film stars Jeremy Renner and was directed by Michael Cuesta.

Landesman wrote and directed the 2015 sports drama film Concussion starring Will Smith, about the Pittsburgh forensic pathologist who uncovered the disease, CTE, in football players, the result of years of concussions and thousands of sub-concussive blows. The pathologist, Dr. Bennet Omalu (Smith's character) makes a David v Goliath journey to tell the truth about the dangers of football in the face of criticism and pressure from the NFL and mainstream media. The film was released on December 25, 2015. Landesman co-wrote HBO's 2017 adaptation of The Immortal Life of Henrietta Lacks.

Landesman directed the 2017 thriller Mark Felt: The Man Who Brought Down the White House, starring Liam Neeson as Mark Felt, the whistleblower Deep Throat who exposed President Nixon. The film was released September 29, 2017 by Sony Pictures Classics.

=== Announced projects ===
In October 2008, Warner Bros. acquired the rights to an action thriller Colombian hostage pitch, and set Landesman to write the script of the film. In June 2011, it was reported that David O. Russell and Brad Pitt were in talks to direct and star in the film, respectively. The film about 15 hostages in the Colombian jungle was titled as The Mission.

In October 2013, Landesman was set to re-write and direct Down by the River, based on a 2002 non-fiction book of same name by Charles Bowden, while Henry Bean wrote the first script.

== Political activism ==
Being of Jewish descent, in August 2015 he signed – as one of 98 members of the Los Angeles Jewish community – an open letter supporting the proposed nuclear agreement between Iran and six world powers led by the United States "as being in the best interest of the United States and Israel."

== Bibliography ==
- 1995 – The Raven
- 1999 – Blood Acre

== Filmography ==
Year	Title	Director	Writer	Producer	Notes
2007	Trade	No	Yes	Executive	
2013	Parkland	Yes	Yes	No	
2014	Kill the Messenger	No	Yes	Executive	
2015	Concussion	Yes	Yes	No	
2017	The Immortal Life of Henrietta Lacks	No	Yes	No	TV movie
2017	Mark Felt: The Man Who Brought Down the White House	Yes	Yes	Yes	
TBA	Eleven Days	Yes	Yes	No	Post-production
