= List of books about cocaine =

This is a chronological list of notable books written about cocaine. Both fictional and non-fictional books are included.

== Fiction ==
- Novel with Cocaine (1934)
- The Snowman (1981)
- Cocaine Blues (1989)
- Clockers (1992)
- The Cobra (2010)

== Non-fiction ==
- Snowblind (1976)
- The Freudian Fallacy (1983)
- Smoke and Mirrors: The War on Drugs and the Politics of Failure (1996)
- Dark Alliance (1998)
- Cocaine: An Unauthorized Biography (2002)
- Marching Powder (2002)
- Kill the Messenger (2006)
- Freeway Rick Ross (2014)
- More Fool Me (2014)
- Beautiful Things (2021)
