= Kill the Messenger (2014 film) =

2014 American biographical film

- Theatrical release poster
- Directed by: Michael Cuesta
- Written by: Peter Landesman
- Based on: Kill the Messenger by Nick Schou; Dark Alliance by Gary Webb
- Produced by: Pamela Abdy; Naomi Despres; Jeremy Renner; Scott Stuber
- Starring: Jeremy Renner; Rosemarie DeWitt; Ray Liotta; Tim Blake Nelson; Barry Pepper; Oliver Platt; Michael Sheen; Michael K. Williams; Mary Elizabeth Winstead; Andy García
- Cinematography: Sean Bobbitt
- Edited by: Brian A. Kates
- Music by: Nathan Johnson
- Production companies: Bluegrass Films; The Combine
- Distributed by: Focus Features
- Release date: October 10, 2014
- Running time: 112 minutes
- Country: United States
- Language: English
- Budget: $5 million
- Box office: $6.7 million

Kill the Messenger is a 2014 American biographical crime thriller film directed by Michael Cuesta and written by Peter Landesman. It is based on the book of the same name by Nick Schou and the book Dark Alliance by Gary Webb. The film stars Jeremy Renner, who also produced the film. The film was released on October 10, 2014, and depicts a reporter's suppressed attempts to cover the CIA involvement and secret support of large scale cocaine sales to fund the Nicaraguan Contras.

== Plot ==
In 1996, San Jose Mercury News reporter Gary Webb interviews drug dealer Ronny Quail, who is outraged that the government used civil asset forfeiture to keep his house even after he was acquitted. Webb's ensuing article about the abuses of forfeiture garners repeated phone calls from a woman named Coral, whom he agrees to meet when she says she has documents that prove the government sponsored cocaine sales in the U.S. Coral gives Webb a transcript of grand jury testimony (normally kept secret) which was accidentally released to her boyfriend, an accused drug dealer, during discovery. After Webb reveals to the prosecutor in the case that he has the transcript, the government drops the charges against Coral's boyfriend in order to protect their main witness: Oscar Danilo Blandón.

After Webb researches Blandón and comes across the pending case of "Freeway" Rick Ross, he is stunned to learn that Blandón is a paid informant. Armed with this knowledge, Ross' attorney elicits from Blandón his sworn testimony outlining the CIA's alleged involvement in Contra cocaine trafficking—that the CIA actively supported Blandón and his partners’ smuggling of cocaine into the U.S. and used the profits to benefit the Nicaraguan Contras.

Webb travels to a prison in Managua and speaks to Blandón's partner, Norwin Meneses, who confirms Oliver North's involvement in the basic "drugs for guns" scheme to use profits from cocaine trafficking to fund the Contras. In Washington, D.C., Webb tracks down Fred Weil, a National Security Council employee who was an investigator on the Kerry Committee report, which touched on the same issues. Like many other people that Webb speaks to, Weil warns him that the subject may put him in danger. For good measure, federal agents summon Webb to a meeting where they warn him against publishing what he has learned.

The paper publishes Webb's story as a three-part series with the title "Dark Alliance"; it is an immediate sensation. Humiliated by being scooped by a regional paper, the Los Angeles Times, Washington Post, and The New York Times all dig into Webb's reporting. Webb views their follow-up reporting as being far too deferential to the CIA. Eventually, their reporting turns to Webb himself, including an affair he had while working at The Plain Dealer.

Webb is banished to the newspaper's Cupertino bureau to cover mundane local news. However, he continues to work on the story. He is awakened in his motel room one night by John Cullen, who is precisely the kind of CIA source with direct knowledge of the scheme that Webb's reporting needs. Webb's exhilaration at finding Cullen is quickly dampened when the paper reveals its plans to write an open letter calling into question aspects of its "Dark Alliance" reporting. At a Society of Professional Journalists dinner honoring Webb as the Bay Area "Journalist of the Year", he submits his resignation to his editors. An epilogue reveals that in 2004 Gary Webb was found dead in his apartment, shot twice in the head. His death was ruled a suicide.

== Cast ==
- Jeremy Renner as Gary Webb
- Rosemarie DeWitt as Susan Webb
- Ray Liotta as John Cullen
- Tim Blake Nelson as Alan Fenster
- Barry Pepper as Russell Dodson
- Mary Elizabeth Winstead as Anna Simons
- Paz Vega as Coral Baca
- Oliver Platt as Jerome Ceppos
- Michael Sheen as Fred Weil
- Richard Schiff as Walter Pincus
- Andy García as Norwin Meneses
- Robert Patrick as Ronny Quail
- Michael K. Williams as "Freeway" Rick Ross
- Jena Sims as Little Hottie
- Joshua Close as Rich Kline
- Yul Vazquez as Danilo Blandon
- Robert Pralgo as Sheriff Nelson
- Lucas Hedges as Ian Webb
- Michael Rose as Jonathan Yarnold
- Matt Lintz as Eric Webb
- Michael H. Cole as Pete Carey
- David Lee Garver as Douglas Farah
- Andrew Masset as Johnathan Krim

== Production ==
The script was written by former journalist Peter Landesman. The film was initially devolved at Universal in 2008 but it was put in turnaround and moved to their Focus Features subsidiary, which was more focussed on independent projects. Jeremy Renner joined the film as star and producer before funding had been secured, and helped to get the film financed independently.

On March 5, 2014, Focus Features announced that the film would be released on October 10, 2014.

=== Filming ===
Principal photography began on July 16, 2013 in several Georgia locations, including Atlanta, Cobb County and Decatur.

=== Music ===
Nathan Johnson composed the score for the film, and Back Lot Music released a soundtrack album on October 7, 2014.

== Release ==
Kill the Messenger received a regional theatrical release by Focus Features on October 10, 2014.

Several weeks after the Kill the Messenger premiere, the significant lack of advertising for the film and its rapid retraction from theaters led to the creation of a petition to re-release the film in theaters on November 24, 2014 through Change.org, entitled "Focus Features: Support Gary Webb and Re-Release Kill the Messenger in Theaters."

This petition was also spurred on after Focus Features failed to attend a private screening for the film hosted by the Writers Guild of America in mid-November, despite positive reviews for the film. Through the petition and direct appeals to Focus Features, attention was drawn to the fact that the film distribution company aired more national television commercials for Kill the Messenger six weeks after the premiere date than they did before the film was released in theaters, and almost exclusively outside of primetime hours and off of major broadcasting companies.

As a result of this marketing campaign, the highest domestic television coverage for Kill the Messenger occurred when it had been retracted from all but 18 theaters in the United States and three weeks before its theatrical run was ended. Attention was also drawn to the large discrepancy in the amount of television advertising that Focus Features gave to each of its fall releases, specifically between Kill the Messenger, which was given a total of 448 national advertisements, to Theory of Everything, which was nationally aired 3,046 times and largely on major television networks (i.e., ABC, NBC, CBS, MTV).

The petition picked up a strong momentum through social media, accruing over 2,000 signatures in less than two weeks. The weekend of December 5, Focus Features expanded Kill the Messenger to 19 additional theaters, for a sum of 27 theaters overall.

On December 11, Universal Pictures Home Entertainment announced the DVD release date for Kill the Messenger, several days before the petition reached 2,500 signatures.

In early February, Kill the Messenger was leaked online, and was reportedly among the top ten films with the most unauthorized downloads for several weeks.

== Reception ==
=== Box office ===
Kill the Messenger grossed $2.5 million in the United States and Canada, and $4.2 million in other countries, for a worldwide total of $6.7 million, against a production budget of $5 million. Sales of its DVD/Blu-ray releases earned $3.3 million.

=== Critical reception ===
The film has received generally positive reviews from critics. On Rotten Tomatoes, the film holds a rating of 77%, based on 131 reviews, with an average rating of 6.6/10. The site's consensus reads, "Kill the Messenger's potent fury over the tale of its real-life subject overrides its factual inaccuracies and occasional narrative stumbles." On Metacritic, the film has a score of 60 out of 100, based on 36 critics.

Andrew Barker of Variety wrote: "The film taps into far deeper, richer veins of material than it has the time to properly mine. It’s nonetheless a flinty, brainy, continually engrossing work that straddles the lines between biopic, political thriller and journalistic cautionary tale, driven by Jeremy Renner’s most complete performance since The Hurt Locker."

=== Accolades ===
Year	Awarding Body	Category	Recipients	Result
2014	Women Film Critics Circle	Best Actor	Jeremy Renner	Nominated
2014	Women Film Critics Circle	Best Male Images in a Movie	Jeremy Renner, Barry Pepper, Andy Garcia, Tim Blake Nelson, Michael Kenneth Williams, Robert Patrick, Michael Sheen, Oliver Platt, Lucas Hedges, Josh Close, Ray Liotta	Nominated
2014	Washington D.C. Area Film Critics Association	Joe Barber Award-Best Portrayal of Washington D.C.	Michael Cuesta, Jeremy Renner, Don Handfield, Peter Landesman, Michael Bederman, Sean Babbit	Nominated
2014	James Agee Cinema Circle	Best Progressive Picture	Michael Cuesta, The Combine	Won
2014	James Agee Cinema Circle	Robeson Award	Michael Cuesta, The Combine	Won
2014	James Agee Cinema Circle	Best Actor	Jeremy Renner	Won
2015	Georgia Film Critics Association	Oglethorpe Award for Excellence in Georgia Cinema	Michael Cuesta, Peter Landesman	Nominated
2015	Golden Trailer Awards	Most Original Poster	Focus Features, Ignition	Won
2015	Traverse City Film Festival	Best American Film	Michael Cuesta	Won
2015	Whistle Blower Summit for Civil & Human Rights	Pillar Award for Best Whistle Blower Film	Michael Cuesta	Won
