= News & Review =

Newspaper group based in Chico, California

- Type: Alternative weekly
- Owner(s): Chico Community Publishing, Inc.; Coachella Valley Independent LLC
- Founded: 1977
- Headquarters: Chico CA, Sacramento CA and Reno NV
- Website: newsreview.com renonr.com

The News & Review is a group of free alternative weekly newspapers published by Chico Community Publishing, Inc. of Chico, California. The company publishes the Chico News & Review in Chico, California, the Sacramento News & Review in Sacramento, California, and, through January 30, 2022, the Reno News & Review in Reno, Nevada. On January 31, 2022, the Reno News & Review was sold to Coachella Valley Independent LLC.

The chain started out as an on-campus newspaper for California State University, Chico called The Wildcat, but after a dispute with the administration, the newspaper moved off campus to become an independent publication.

Print publication of the newspapers was temporarily suspended after publisher Jeff vonKaenel told employees on March 16, 2020, that the COVID-19 pandemic led to a drastic downturn in advertising revenue that had already been in decline. Although a digital presence was maintained on the three newspapers' websites, much of the staff was laid off with the publication of editions dated March 19, 2020.

Beginning in July 2020, the Sacramento News & Review and Chico News & Review returned to newsstands with monthly issues. However, the Sacramento News & Review was forced to suspend print publication once again in January 2021. The Chico News & Review continued printing monthly issues, until announcing in December 2023 that its last physical edition would be printed on January 11, 2024. Its content is now run strictly online.

The Sacramento News & Review remains online-only. The Reno News & Review resumed print publication as a monthly starting with the June 2022 issue.

== Chico News & Review ==
CN&R
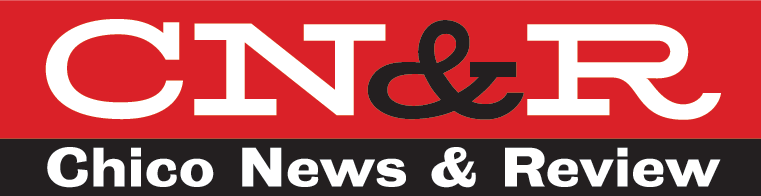
- Format: Website
- Owner(s): Chico Community Publishing, Inc.
- Founded: 1977
- Headquarters: Chico, CA
- Website: chico.newsreview.com
- Free online archives: newsreview.com/chico

The Chico News & Review (CN&R) is the first of the three News & Review papers, founded in 1977. The Chico News & Review is noted as one of the few alternative papers to out-circulate its local daily paper, the Chico Enterprise-Record, with a cumulative readership of over 100,000, according to the Circulation Verification Council's 2015 report. The founding editor was Robert Speer, and the current editor is also the editor of the Sacramento News & Review, Scott T. Anderson, who is based in the Sacramento area. Anderson took over for longtime arts editor Jason Cassidy, who was promoted after longtime Editor-in-Chief Melissa Daugherty, the first woman to helm the paper, relinquished her role after the pandemic shut down the newspaper. The paper did return to print monthly, albeit as a significantly smaller publication, but eventually transitioned to online-only, where it remains today. Its writing comes solely from freelance contributors, as there are no local editorial staff members.

In 2016, a partnership with the North Valley Community Foundation, and matching small community donations helped support investigative journalism in Butte County, California. After the decline of advertising support in March 2020, community members began supporting the paper through contributions made on their website. The CN&R's most well-known annual issues are:

- Best of Chico, annual issue with the results of a readers' poll and editors' choices of the best places, people and things in Chico
- Keep Chico Weird, annual issue coinciding with the Keep Chico Weird event
- Goin' Chico, annual student guide to welcome new California State University, Chico students to the area
- Cammies (Chico Area Music Awards), annual issue profiling the readers' and critics' choice for best bands and musicians

=== Events ===
In 2005, the Chico News & Review started the Chico Area Music Celebration (CAMMIES) to honor the vibrant, eclectic music scene in Butte County, California. Winners are selected by CN&R readers in a list of musical genres, including Singer-songwriter, Hard rock/Metal, Blues, Jam/R&B/Funk, Rap, Punk/Ska and others. Critics vote for winners in more specific areas, e.g. Best Male/Female vocalist, Best Guitarist, Best Drummer, Best Local CD, Local Badass, etc.

Keep Chico Weird is an annual event to honor the weird of Chico and Butte County, who help foster an environment of tolerance and creativity. CN&R produces a Keep Chico Weird Art Show and a Keep Chico Weird Talent Show, that highlights a wide range of artists and art, including sword swallowers, mimes, spelling-bee champs, organ grinders, etc.

Chico Beer Week is another annual event celebrating craft beer in Chico and is coordinated with local breweries, bars, restaurants and retailers responsible for the area's local craft-beer scene.

The continuation of these annual events is unclear due to the limitations the COVID-19 pandemic has placed on the paper.

=== Noted stories ===
- Iraq War for Dummies, 2003: Days before the United States invaded Iraq, this cover story warned that it might take "many years and cost hundreds of billions of dollars" to build a new nation in Iraq
- Lack of Oversight, 2001: When Jack Nickerson Jr. was killed after a gas tank exploded, this story revealed that government agents' negligence was a major factor in his death
- The Bidwell Bungle, 1995: After purchasing 1,380 acres of land on the south side of Big Chico Creek, CN&R discovered that the city of Chico had been flummoxed by the sellers and had overpaid by as much as $1 million
- The Kids Society Forgot, 1990: Multi-story issue on the foster-care system, illuminating the lives of 700 Butte County children who were taken away from their parents
- Boys of the Valley, 1988: Special issue on chronicling the lives of every one of the 66 area soldiers killed in the Vietnam war

== Sacramento News & Review ==
Sacramento News & Review
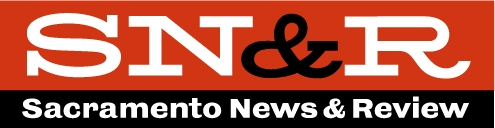
- Format: Previously print alt-weekly, now website
- Owner: Chico Community Publishing
- Founded: 1989
- Headquarters: Sacramento, CA
- Website: sacramento.newsreview.com
- Free online archives: newsreview.com/sacramento

The Sacramento News & Review (SN&R), founded in 1989, was the largest of the three News & Review papers prior to the COVID-19 pandemic, with a cumulative readership of roughly 330,000 people, according to the Winter 2015 Media Audit Report, run by International Demographics. The founding editor was Melinda Welsh; Scott Anderson is currently acting news editor.

Its most well-known annual issues are:

- Best of Sacramento, annual issue with the results of a readers' poll and editors' choices of the best places, people and things in Sacramento
- Summer Guide & Winter Guide, seasonal guides about what to do during each season in and around Sacramento
- Sammies (Sacramento Area Music Awards), annual issue profiling the readers' and critics' choice for best bands and musicians

These annual issues have been suspended in the wake of the COVID-19 pandemic.

In 2013, a grant from the Sacramento Emergency Foodlink allowed the SN&R to conduct independent research, reporting and distribution of articles on the subject of poverty in the Sacramento region from November 2012 to October 2013.

The paper is noted as the last place of employment of investigative journalist Gary Webb, who began working at the paper after the Dark Alliance scandal. Webb allegedly committed suicide while working for the paper.

=== Events ===
==== Sacramento Area Music Awards ====
In 1992, the Sacramento News & Review started the Sacramento Area Music Awards (SAMMIES) to honor and promote the growing music scene in Sacramento. Winners are selected by SN&R readers in a list of musical genres, including Folk rock, Funk, Hard rock, Blues, Punk and many more. Critics vote for winners in more specific areas, e.g. Male/Female vocalist, Keyboardist, Bassist, etc. Winners of the SAMMIES include Cake (band), Deftones, Oleander (band) and others.

==== Interfaith ====
On the first anniversary of September 11, the Sacramento News & Review brought together musical acts from different faith groups around Sacramento for a Call For Unity Event to symbolize the city's acceptance of racial and religious diversity. Every year someone in the region was honored with a Building Unity Award for their interfaith work in Sacramento, until 2008, when the last Call for Unity event was held.

In December 2015, the News & Review, in partnership with Sacramento's local Habitat for Humanity, began a Build for Unity project, where Muslims, Christians, and other faith groups came together to build Habitat houses, in part as a response to the anti-Muslim rhetoric of national politics. The project was funded in large part by generous donations from a wide range of faith groups.

=== Noted stories ===
- Heart of the (Gray) Matter, 2004: Joel Davis was diagnosed with Parkinson's disease, and wrote an award-winning first-person account of the brain surgery he underwent while conscious
- Breaking Away, 2002: News & Review led 30 weeklies in a national effort to cover the issue of priests who leave the Catholic Church because they can no longer live with the celibacy requirements
- Poor America, 1997: News & Review led a national effort of 90 weekly newspapers around the country in a conversation about welfare reform and extreme poverty in the nation
- Mainstream Newspapers, R.I.P., 1996: Cover story predicting the decline of daily newspapers by 2006, a prediction which has largely come true
- What's Up Chuck, 1996: Award-winning investigative story about the curious relationship between big insurance and the California Insurance Commissioner Chuck Quackenbush
- Free Speech, 1994: This issue is the culmination of a five-month censorship battle with right-wing group, American Family Association

=== Controversy ===
In 2015, after learning that Mayor Kevin Johnson primarily used a private email account with his staff while in public office, the Sacramento News & Review issued a Freedom of Information request to gain access to (then) Mayor Kevin Johnson's emails. An attorney for the city deemed the emails public property, but instead of handing them over, the Mayor moved to sue the Sacramento News & Review and the city of Sacramento. In response to the lawsuit, the Sacramento News & Review published a cover story where, according to their statement, a cartoon depicts Kevin Johnson as "sweaty and nervous while reading about his lawsuit against this paper and allegations of email misuse." Betty Williams, the former president of Sacramento's local NAACP and a longtime associate of Kevin Johnson, released a statement criticizing the paper for its "racially biased news coverage" of the mayor, mainly referring to the cartoon portrayal of the mayor. The lawsuit and the allegations of racially biased news coverage attracted the attention of Deadspin who began covering the story, bringing national attention to the many allegations against Kevin Johnson, including allegations of sexual assault and harassment. This national attention put pressure on ESPN to not air a film praising Kevin Johnson's work in Sacramento with the Sacramento Kings and their new downtown arena. Almost immediately after ESPN pulled the film, Kevin Johnson announced that he would not be seeking another term as Mayor of the City of Sacramento. In March 2016, the News & Review was recognized by the James Madison Freedom of Information Awards for its significant contributions to advancing freedom of information for this legal battle to obtain Sacramento Mayor Kevin Johnson's emails.

=== Solving Sacramento collaborative ===
In June 2022, the Sacramento News & Review, along with the Sacramento Observer, brought together seven Sacramento news organizations into a collaborative called Solving Sacramento. The Sacramento Business Journal, Russian American Media (a three-publication media company), Outword Magazine (an LGBTQ+ publication), CapRadio, and Univision Sacramento also joined the collaborative effort, working together to produce and share local news stories. The initial focus was on affordable housing and rebooting the arts.

This collaborative was initially funded through a grant from Solutions Journalism Network, and is fiscally sponsored by Local Media Foundation.

== Reno News & Review ==
RN&R
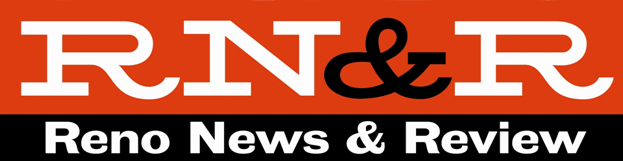
- Format: Previously print alt-weekly, now print monthly plus website
- Owner: Coachella Valley Independent LLC
- Founded: 1985
- Headquarters: Reno, NV
- Website: renonr.com

The Reno News & Review (RN&R) was founded in 1995, when News & Review purchased the assets of Nevada Weekly, changing the name and creating the third News & Review paper. The Reno News & Review has a cumulative readership of roughly 90,000, according to the Winter 2015 Media Audit Report, run by International Demographics. Longtime editor D. Brian Burghart stepped down in 2016 to focus on his national project, Fatal Encounters, which uses crowd sourced data to estimate the number of killings by law enforcement officers in the United States. The paper's current editor is Frank X. Mullen, who came out of retirement in 2020 to write for the paper.

On January 31, 2022, the assets of the newspaper were sold to Coachella Valley Independent LLC, a company owned by Reno native and former RN&R editor Jimmy Boegle, who also publishes the Coachella Valley Independent in Palm Springs, California. Boegle announced the paper would be launching a new website, RenoNR.com, and said he had a goal of bringing the paper back to print as a monthly sometime in 2022. In April, the RN&R announced it would resume print publication as a monthly starting with a June 2022 issue. The June 2022 issue began hitting streets over Memorial Day weekend.

Its most well-known annual issues are:

- Best of Reno, annual issue with the results of a readers' poll and editors' choices of the best places, people and things in Northern Nevada
- Summer, Fall & Winter Guide, seasonal guides to what to do in Northern Nevada
- Prep for the Playa, annual guide for people who plan to make the trek to Burning Man in the Black Rock Desert

=== Events ===
Rollin' on the River began in 1996 as a community concert series, and has evolved into one of Reno's largest free summer music events. Rollin' on the River is held in Wingfield Park, an island amphitheater on the Truckee River, during the month of July and features both local and regional touring artists.

=== Noted stories ===
- Stewart Indian School's 200 unmarked graves, 2021: RN&R investigation on the illnesses, accidents and epidemics that took their toll on native students at Nevada's Stewart Indian School, and that resulted in the deaths of around 200 children
- Fatal Encounters, 2014: Roughly yearlong series focused on the six specific areas of "When law enforcement kills," this series and the accompanying Fatal Encounters website brought national attention to the current editor, D. Brian Burghart, who appeared on The Daily Show and whose writings and research were featured in Gawker and other news outlets
- Showdown in Crescent Valley, 2003: Cover story about the 30-year battle of two Western Shoshone grandmothers trying to live and raise cattle on their ancestral lands
- Living through chemistry, 2002: Two Reno men talk about what it's like to maintain their lives with a lifelong drug addiction
- Mind over madness, 2001: Exposé about missing money and leadership problems at Nevada Mental Health Institute yet-to-be-opened hospital
- Paying Debts, 1999: RN&R investigation of the campaign finances of Reno City Councilwoman Sherrie Doyle resulted in 16 felony indictments

=== Selected awards ===
- The University of Nevada, Reno Donald W. Reynolds School of Journalism in partnership with Nevada Humanities selected Editor Frank X. Mullen as the 2021 Robert Laxalt Distinguished Writer in November 2021.
- Editor Frank X. Mullen inducted into the Nevada Newspaper Hall of Fame in September 2021
- Former Reno News & Review news editor and reporter Dennis Myers, who died in 2019 at age 70, was inducted into the Nevada Newspaper Hall of Fame in September 2020.
- Inaugural Eddie Scott/Bertha Woodard Human Rights Advocacy Award for "Fatal Encounters," "On Paper" and "When Hate Comes to Town" in 2015, The NAACP Reno-Sparks Branch No. 1112
- Freedom of the Press Award in 2015, Association of Alternative Newsmedia

== N&R Publications ==
N&R Publications was founded in 2010 as a separate division of the company that produces client publications for nonprofit organizations, government agencies and businesses. The publications, which are distributed both in print and digitally, use a journalistic approach to tell stories that communicate the messages of the client organizations. The custom publications cover many topics, including health, education, environment, social justice, child support, mosquito & vector control, disabilities, veterans and housing. N&R Publication Editor is Thea Rood. The division has produced more than 675 publications for clients across the country.

== Projects ==
In 2002, in cooperation with AlterNet, the News & Review led a national project with more than 30 weeklies nationwide to cover the story of married priests and the Catholic Church reform movement.

In 2007, the News & Review, with the help of a small grant from the Association of Alternative Newsmedia, led 53 alternative weeklies across the country in a joint cover project marking the 10-year anniversary of the Kyoto Accord, the first international attempt to bring world leaders together to combat climate change.

In 2012, the News & Review received a grant from the Sierra Health Foundation to help fund stories throughout California about the state's low rates of participation in CalFresh, colloquially known as food stamps.

In 2015, the News & Review led a nationwide project, Letters to the Future, asking authors, artists, scientists and other to write to future generations predicting the success or failure of the 2015 U.N. Climate Talks in Paris. Hundreds of letters were collected and presented to diplomats present in Paris, including letters penned by Michael Pollan, Jane Smiley, Stephen Robinson, Aisha Kahlil, T. C. Boyle, Kim Stanley Robinson, Annie Leonard, Roxana Robinson, Jack Miles, Pam Houston, Geraldine Brooks (writer), Rebecca Goldstein, Lois Wolk, Harry Reid, Brent Bourgeois and others.
