= Celerino =

Celerino is both a surname and a given name. Notable people with the name include:

- Gioele Celerino (born 1993), Italian rugby league player
- Celerino Castillo III (born 1949), United States Drug Enforcement Administration agent
- Celerino Sánchez (1944–1992), Mexican baseball player
