= Freeway Rick Ross (book) =

2014 memoir by former drug kingpin Rick Ross

- Authors: Rick Ross, Cathy Scott
- Cover artist: Richard Yoo
- Language: English
- Genre: True crime, Autobiography
- Publisher: Freeway Studios
- Publication date: June 17, 2014
- English publication date: 2014
- Media type: Paperback
- Pages: 298 pp
- ISBN: 9781499651539
- OCLC: 2014910308

Freeway Rick Ross: The Untold Autobiography is a 2014 memoir by former drug kingpin Rick Ross, co-authored by American crime writer Cathy Scott, about the rise and fall of Ross, in the 1980s and '90s, to his 2009 release from prison. The book was released by Freeway Studios in June 2014.

== Storyline ==
According to the publisher, the book embarks on the day-to-day dealings of a drug kingpin in the heart of the ghetto. It is also the story of a boy born into poverty in Texas who grew up in a single-parent household in the heart of South Central Los Angeles, next to the 110, thus the nickname "Freeway," and was pushed through the school system, emerging illiterate. He saw his options as few and turned to drug dealing. The book also covers Ross' history of domestic violence, recounting an incident in which he kicked a pregnant girlfriend down a flight of stairs, causing a miscarriage.

Authors Ross and Scott chronicle the times by highlighting the social climate that made crack cocaine so desirable. Ross points out that at the time the "cops in the area didn't know what crack was; they didn't associate the small white rocks they saw on homies as illegal drugs." All Ross knew was people wanted it, so he sold it.

During his reign as the head of a nationwide drug enterprise, it is estimated that Ross profited nearly $300 million, selling nearly $3 million worth of drugs in one day. Ross' role in what became known as the Iran-Contra affair that took place during the Ronald Reagan administration was outlined in San Jose Mercury News reporter Gary Webb's original series of articles alleging that the CIA was complicit in smuggling drugs into the U.S., which effectively ignited the crack-cocaine epidemic of the 1980s.

The autobiography includes the outcome of Ross' crack cocaine dealing, his conviction of conspiracy to illegally traffic cocaine, and the knowledge that the money Ross paid drug supplier Danilo Blandón funded the Nicaraguan rebels in the Contra scandal, which Ross learned of while in prison when he was informed by San Jose Mercury-News reporter Webb. It also details Ross' successful appeal of his life sentence without the possibility of parole and his re-sentencing to 20 years. Ross was released from custody in September 2009.

In July 2014, Ross talked about what is included in the book, telling the NPR affiliate in Los Angeles that it took about five years of dealing before he saw the negative impact crack was having on his community, but customers asked for more. When he realized he did not want to see his brother or sister smoke crack cocaine, he decided to get out and start a legitimate business. "This story," wrote Crimespree Magazine's Marie Nicoll, "will be retold and shared to American classrooms to children on what can happen when you go down the wrong path. His story shows the true meaning of having everything you could imagine, but at what price."

In the book's foreword, Los Angeles Bishop Noel Jones writes that "this work portrays the heart of a man who is seeking the opportunity, in whatever form, to right the wrongs he has done to his community."

== Reception ==
Freeway Rick Ross debuted at the Eso Won Bookstore in Los Angeles at a book launch on June 17, 2014 to a standing-room only crowd.

KCET TV wrote in its review, "(The book) is fascinating for its unsentimental, inside look at his career on the streets of South Central, which started for Ross with car theft and quickly shifted to drugs and the big time."

The Los Angeles Sentinel wrote, "While some have yet to move past the stigma of Ross' former image, it has worked to his advantage in dissuading students interested in following in his foot steps.

Upon its release, The Huffington Post UK's Ruth Jacobs described the book as "the eagerly awaited autobiography."

During a national book tour, Fox 59 in Indianapolis interviewed Ross about his autobiography in September 2014 for its morning show.

== Awards ==
The book was named a finalist in ForeWord Reviews' Best Book of the Year 2014.
