= American Drug War: The Last White Hope =

2007 documentary film

American Drug War
- DVD cover
- Directed by: Kevin Booth
- Produced by: Sacred Cow
- Starring: Sheriff Joe Arpaio, Jello Biafra, Chico Brown, Celerino Castillo III, Tommy Chong, Sergeant Lou Daigle, Dr. Gary Fisher, Judge Jim Gray, Dr. Charles Grob, Dr. Claudia Jensen, Gary Johnson, Dennis Kucinich, General Barry McCaffrey, Todd McCormick, Cynthia McKinney, Robert Melamede, Ron Paul, Joe Pietri, Tom Rhodes, Joe Rogan, Freeway Ricky Ross, Michael Ruppert, Robert Steele, and others.
- Narrated by: Kevin Booth
- Distributed by: Passion River Films
- Release date: 2007
- Running time: 118 minutes
- Country: United States
- Language: English

American Drug War: The Last White Hope is a 2007 documentary film by writer and director Kevin Booth about the war on drugs in the United States.

== Synopsis ==
The film holds the view that the war on drugs has become one of the longest, darkest, most costly periods in American history. Texas filmmaker Kevin Booth sets out to prove his claim that the Drug War has failed. Three and a half years in the making, the film includes sections showing 62 people including former DEA agents, CIA officers, narcotics officers, judges, politicians, gang members, prisoners, and celebrities. There is also extensive treatment of CIA and Contras cocaine trafficking in the US.

== Awards ==
- 2007 Artivist Film Festival, Best Feature, Intl. Human Rights
- 2007 Silver Lake Film Festival, Best Documentary
- 2007 DIY Film Fest, Best Documentary
- 2006 Evil City, Best Documentary

== Television ==
- Picked up by Showtime in March 2008 to be aired for the next two years.
- Shown on Australia's Foxtel Crime & Investigation Network.

== See also ==
- Breaking the Taboo, 2011 documentary
- Chasing the Scream: The First and Last Days of the War on Drugs, 2015 book
