= Florida Trend =

Monthly business magazine in Florida, US

- Type: Monthly
- Format: Magazine
- Owner: Times Holding Company
- Publisher: David G. Denor
- Editor: Amy Keller
- Founded: 1958
- Headquarters: 801 Third Street South; St. Petersburg, Florida 33701, United States
- Circulation: 53,762 (June 2025)
- ISSN: 0015-4326
- Website: floridatrend.com

Florida Trend is a statewide media company delivering business news and information across print, digital and video platforms. The media company reports on a range of economic and industry sectors, including, but not limited to, health care, education, technology, finance, law, transportation and real estate. Florida Trend regularly hosts community and industry portrait events with business and community leaders. Florida Trend media company's business and editorial operations are overseen by President and Publisher David G. Denor.

Founded in 1958, Florida Trend is the longest running statewide business-to-business magazine in the nation.

The monthly business magazine has an active verified circulation of 53,762. According to Circulation Verification Council readership survey data, the magazine has a certified pass-along audience of over 292,000 monthly readers and 81% of readers are executives, managers, owners or professionals. The audience is affluent, with an average household income of $349,000 and an average household net worth of $2.6 million.

Florida Trend is a member of the Circulation Verification Council.

== Article content ==
In addition to news coverage, editorial assessment and environmental trends, Florida Trend offers statewide rankings and statistical information: these include the annual Economic Outlook, offering insights into Florida's population by age, income, projected population and growth-related statistics; Florida's 350 Biggest Companies, which ranks Florida's top public and private companies by revenue; and Best Companies To Work For, ranked by the results of a voluntary and anonymous survey — administered through an independent, third-party data and analytics firm — to employees of small, medium and large organizations.

Along with the 12 monthly issues, Florida Trend produces several specialty annuals publications, including Florida 500, which highlights influential business leaders across major industries; Business Florida, a recruitment guide focusing on Florida's economic development interests and Florida Small Business, a resource for entrepreneurs, developed in coordination with the Florida Small Business Development Network and the Florida Division of Corporations. Additionally, the company publishes NEXT, a special magazine and website focused on postsecondary education options.

== Digital content ==
FloridaTrend.com garners over 100,000 unique visitors each month. Its daily business eNews alerts and weekly industry targeted eNewsletters are delivered to over 93,000 opt-in e-news subscribers. Each month, Florida Trend delivers nearly 2 million eNews alerts to its digital opt-in subscriber audience.

== Awards ==
Florida Trend has been honored to receive regional and national awards annually, including excellence in industry awards from the Society of Professional Journalists, the American Society of Business Publication Editors, and the Alliance of Area Business Publications.

== Operations and headquarters ==
Florida Trend is based in St. Petersburg, Florida, and has satellite news and advertising offices in other cities around Florida. Florida Trend is owned by Times Holding Company, which is also the parent of the Tampa Bay Times, Florida's largest newspaper. The Times is, in turn, owned by the Poynter Institute, a school for journalists founded by Nelson Poynter.
