= Dark Alliance (book) =

Book by Gary Webb

Dark Alliance: The CIA, the Contras, and the Crack Cocaine Explosion
- Cover of the 1998 first edition
- Author: Gary Webb
- Publisher: Seven Stories Press
- Publication date: May 1998 (hardcover)
- Media type: Print (hardcover, paperback)
- Pages: 548
- ISBN: 1-888363-68-1
- OCLC: 38281498
- Dewey Decimal: 363.4/5/097285

Dark Alliance: The CIA, the Contras, and the Crack Cocaine Explosion is a 1998 book by journalist Gary Webb. The book is based on "Dark Alliance", Webb's three-part investigative series published in the San Jose Mercury News in August 1996. The original series claimed that, in order to help raise funds for efforts against the Nicaraguan Sandinista government, the CIA supported cocaine trafficking into the US by top members of Nicaraguan Contra Rebel organizations and allowed the subsequent crack epidemic to spread in Los Angeles. The book expands on the series and recounts media reaction to Webb's original newspaper exposé.

Dark Alliance was published in 1998 by Seven Stories Press, with an introduction by U.S. Representative Maxine Waters. A revised edition was published in 1999. The same year the book won a Pen Oakland Censorship Award and a Firecracker Alternative Book Award. It served as part of the basis for Kill the Messenger, a 2014 film based on Webb's life.

== Synopsis ==
According to Webb, in the 1980s when the CIA exerted a certain amount of control over Contra groups such as the FDN, the agency as well as the U.S. Drug Enforcement Administration (DEA) granted amnesty to and put on the agency's bankroll important Contra supporters and fundraisers who were known to the US Government to be cocaine smugglers. Later, at the behest of Oliver North, the Reagan Administration began to use Contra drug money to support the anti-communist Nicaraguan rebels' efforts against the Sandinista government. The Sandinistas were hated by successive Democratic and Republican U.S. administrations due to their communist affiliations.

Blandon, a cocaine smuggler who founded an FDN chapter in Los Angeles, was a major supplier for Freeway Ricky Ross. With access to cheap, pure cocaine and the idea to cook the cocaine into crack, Ross established a major drug network and fueled the popularity of crack. By 1983, Ross was purchasing 10 to 15 kilos of cocaine a week from CIA-backed Contra supporter Blandon - according to Blandon. All the while, Webb alleges, the CIA was supporting the Contras supplying him with the cocaine. Meanwhile, the US Justice Department and its agencies - who were aware of the Contra-linked drug trafficking operations of the FDN supporters - derailed local police investigations and blocked the prosecution of the Contra-linked cocaine traffickers.

Webb also discusses his experiences writing the investigative series that the book expands on. He notes that the use of the Internet and the uploading of the documents on which his assertions rest "made it possible to share [the files the story was based on] directly with your readers. If they cared to, they could read and hear exactly what you had read and heard, and make up their own minds about the story. It was raw interactive journalism, perhaps too interactive for some." The release of the "Dark Alliance" series on the San Jose Mercury News' state-of-the-art website, complete with images and facsimiles of the copious official US Government documentary record assembled by Webb and his colleagues broke new ground for both journalism and the Internet. Microsoft's Encarta encyclopedia enthused that "The unlimited space of the Web allowed the Mercury News to move forward into a whole new kind of journalism... the Web... let intelligent readers review the source materials and draw their own conclusions. This step, far beyond the traditional role of newspapers, attracted attention and readers from all over the world." The number of visits or "hits" to the "Dark Alliance" website rapidly climbed to 500,000, then 800,000 and topped out at 1,000,000 a day - phenomenal for this early stage of the development of the modern Internet. In October 1996, two months after the release of the series, a Boston Globe reporter wrote "that the story was 'pulsing through [L.A.'s] black neighborhoods like a shockwave, provoking a stunning, growing level of anger and indignation. Talk-radio stations with predominantly black audiences are deluged with calls on the subject. Demonstrations, candle-lighting ceremonies and town-hall meetings are becoming regular affairs. And people on the street are heatedly discussing the topic.'" "Nonetheless, the media slowly turned against Webb and attempted to discredit him. Notably, The New York Times, The Washington Post, and the Los Angeles Times ran articles calling his argument unfounded. The Mercury News originally stood by Webb’s reporting, but, amidst the denunciations by other news sources, executive editor Jerome Ceppos published an apology for much of the series’ content in May 1997.

== Critical reception ==
Reviewers' opinions of the book were mixed. David Corn, Washington editor for The Nation magazine, reviewed the book in The Washington Post. Corn had previously been critical of aspects of the "Dark Alliance" newspaper series, and he found that the book "reflects the positives and negatives of the original series." He noted that Webb "deserves credit for pursuing an important piece of recent history and forcing the CIA and the Justice Department to investigate the contra-drug connection", but remained critical of several aspects of the book, observing that Webb's "threshold of proof is on the low side".

Michael Massing, an investigative reporter and associate editor of the Columbia Journalism Review, reviewed Dark Alliance in the Los Angeles Times. Massing found that Webb "seems on solid ground in arguing that money from Nicaraguan traffickers ended up in Contra coffers," but observed that "the sums involved are in question." He believed that Webb does not demonstrate that the CIA was involved in or sanctioned these activities, but did show that agency officials "heard allegations ... but did little to intervene." For the assertion that the CIA and the Contras "helped to set off the nation's crack explosion, Massing writes "Webb's account is at its most shaky", and that Webb's overall thesis "seems fantastic." He is also critical of Webb's contacts with Ricky Ross's lawyer Alan Fenster, as recounted in Dark Alliance.

James Adams, Washington correspondent for the Sunday Times, wrote a largely negative review for The New York Times. Adams was critical of Webb's "failure" to contact the CIA to "cross-check sources and allegations," and concluded that "For investigative reporters determined to uncover the truth, procedures like these are unacceptable. Neither the editors of the San Jose Mercury News nor the publishers of these books should have allowed their writers to take such relaxed approaches to a serious subject."

One of the most negative reviews was written by Glenn Garvin in Reason magazine. Garvin, a reporter who served as Managua bureau chief for the Miami Herald, was highly critical of Webb's treatment of sources and evidence: "No subject is too great, too small, or too far afield for Webb to distort or falsify," Garvin wrote. While Garvin said that "a few contra pilots and their associates, particularly on the so-called south front" were involved with narcotraffickers, he rejected Webb's account of contra involvement with cocaine trafficking, which he said is "almost entirely drawn from the claims of a few Nicaraguan traffickers facing long jail terms who were using a the-CIA-made-me-do-it defense." According to Garvin, Webb substantially overstated both the importance of these dealers to the Contras and their actual role in the cocaine trade.
