= Celerino Castillo III =

Celerino Castillo (born 1949) is a former agent for the United States Drug Enforcement Administration (DEA).

== Early life and military service ==
Castillo grew up in Edinburg, Texas, He served in the United States Army from 1970 to 1972 as an infantry sergeant during the Vietnam War. after his military service he transitioned to civilian law enforcement as a detective sergeant with a Texas Police Department from 1974 until 1979, and graduated from the University of Texas–Pan American in 1976 with a BS in Criminal Justice.

== Drug Enforcement Administration ==
While in Vietnam, Castillo had witnessed first-hand the effects of drug abuse on his soldiers. He joined the Drug Enforcement Administration (DEA) as a special agent in 1979, following six years as a police officer with the Edinburg Police Department in Texas during America's "war on drugs", specializing in undercover investigation and acting as a foreign diplomat for six years in South and Central America. He is best known for blowing the whistle on the CIA-backed arms-for-drugs trade used to prop up the 1980s Contra counter-insurgency in Nicaragua, and for the book that he wrote on that subject entitled Powder Burns: Cocaine, Contras and the Drug War; it was released in 1994, two years after he had left the DEA.

== Later career and arrest ==
After leaving the DEA, Castillo worked as a private investigator and also worked to promote his book, appearing on television and lecturing at various universities on the drug war and US foreign policy in Latin America. Since 1997, he has been accepted as an expert witness in federal courts on outrageous government conduct, informants, and racial profiling.

In 2008 (three years before Operation Fast and Furious became publicly known), Castillo told reporter Bill Conroy that agents from the Bureau of Alcohol, Tobacco, Firearms and Explosives (ATF) were participating in the smuggling of high powered weapons into Mexico. According to Castillo, the source of that information was a government informer who was later murdered.

In March 2008, Castillo was arrested for selling firearms without a permit (selling legally-purchased weapons without a firearms-dealer permit). He claimed at that time that he was being targeted by the government in retaliation for his attempts to reveal the illegal activities of government agencies. He pleaded guilty on the advice of his attorney and was sentenced to 37 months in prison. It was later revealed that his attorney was, at the time of his plea, suspended by the State Bar of Texas for misapplying clients' funds. According to Castillo, that was not the only impropriety in the handling of his criminal case. In a letter to the judge (Furgeson) who had overseen the case and handed down the sentence, he stated that the prosecutor had lied to the judge at his sentencing. He was scheduled for release in April 2012.

== See also ==
- Allegations of CIA drug trafficking
- American Drug War: The Last White Hope
- CIA involvement in Contra cocaine trafficking
- Gary Webb
- Iran-Contra Affair
- Ricky Ross (drug trafficker)

== Bibliography ==
- Celerino III Castillo & Dave Harmon (1994). Powderburns: Cocaine, Contras & the Drug War. Mosaic Press. ISBN 978-0889625785.
- Frederick P. Hitz (1999). "Obscuring Propriety: The CIA and Drugs". International Journal of Intelligence and CounterIntelligence. 12 (4): 448–462. doi:10.1080/088506099304990.
- Peter Dale Scott & Jonathan Marshall (1991). Cocaine Politics: Drugs, Armies, and the CIA in Central America. University of California Press. ISBN 978-0-520-07312-8.
