= Eleven Days (film) =

- Directed by: Peter Landesman
- Screenplay by: Kevin Sheridan; Peter Landesman
- Based on: Eleven Days in Hell: The 1974 Carrasco Prison Siege at Huntsville, Texas by William T. Harper
- Produced by: Vincent Newman; Vance Howard
- Starring: Taylor Kitsch; Diego Luna; Jason Isaacs; Rhea Seehorn; Jeffrey Donovan; Jennifer Carpenter; Lola Kirke; John Gallagher Jr.; Tenoch Huerta; Richard Cabral
- Cinematography: Enrique Chediak
- Edited by: Douglas Crise
- Music by: Hayley Moss
- Country: United States
- Language: English

Eleven Days is an upcoming American thriller film directed by Peter Landesman and co-written by Kevin Sheridan. It is based on the 2004 book Eleven Days in Hell: The 1974 Carrasco Prison Siege at Huntsville, Texas by William T. Harper, about the 1974 Huntsville Prison siege.

== Premise ==
In 1974 Texas, a prison warden faces off against a drug dealer whose failed escape attempt turns into a tense 11-day hostage crisis, challenging everyone's moral boundaries as the standoff intensifies.

== Cast ==
- Taylor Kitsch as Jim Estelle
- Diego Luna as Federico Carrasco
- Jason Isaacs as Father Joseph O'Brien
- Rhea Seehorn
- Jeffrey Donovan
- Jennifer Carpenter
- Lola Kirke
- John Gallagher Jr.
- Tenoch Huerta
- Richard Cabral

== Production ==
In July 2025, it was announced that an adaptation of the 2004 book Eleven Days in Hell: The 1974 Carrasco Prison Siege at Huntsville, Texas by William T. Harper was in development, with Peter Landesman directing, and co-writing the screenplay with Kevin Sheridan, and Taylor Kitsch and Diego Luna cast as Jim Estelle and Federico Carrasco, respectively. In August, Jason Isaacs joined the cast as Father Joseph O'Brien, as well as Rhea Seehorn in an undisclosed role. In October, Jeffrey Donovan, Jennifer Carpenter, Lola Kirke, John Gallagher Jr., Tenoch Huerta, and Richard Cabral rounded out the cast.

=== Filming ===
Principal photography began in September 2025, in Texas, with Enrique Chediak serving as the cinematographer.
