= CIA involvement in Contra cocaine trafficking =

Alleged CIA support for cocaine smuggling and other related crimes

A number of writers have alleged that the United States Central Intelligence Agency (CIA) was involved in the Nicaraguan Contras' cocaine trafficking operations during the 1980s Nicaraguan civil war in efforts to finance the Contra group that was trying to topple the Sandinista National Liberation Front. These claims have led to investigations by the United States government, including hearings and reports by the United States House of Representatives, Senate, Department of Justice, and the CIA's Office of the Inspector General which ultimately concluded the allegations were unsupported. The subject remains controversial.

A 1986 investigation by a sub-committee of the Senate Foreign Relations Committee (the Kerry Committee), found that "the Contra drug links included", among other connections, "payments to drug traffickers by the U.S. State Department of funds authorized by the Congress for humanitarian assistance to the Contras, in some cases after the traffickers had been indicted by federal law enforcement agencies on drug charges, in others while traffickers were under active investigation by these same agencies."

The charges of CIA involvement in Contra cocaine trafficking were revived in 1996, when a newspaper series by reporter Gary Webb in the San Jose Mercury News claimed that the trafficking had played an important role in the creation of the crack cocaine drug problem in the United States. Webb's series led to three federal investigations, all of which concluded there was no evidence of a conspiracy by CIA officials or its employees to bring drugs into the United States. The Los Angeles Times, The New York Times, and The Washington Post launched their own investigations and rejected Webb's allegations. However, an internal report issued by the CIA would admit that the agency was at least aware of Contra involvement in drug trafficking, and in some cases dissuaded the DEA and other agencies from investigating the Contra supply networks involved.

== Early reports of Contra cocaine trafficking ==
In 1984, U.S. officials began receiving reports of Contra cocaine trafficking. Three officials told journalists that they considered these reports "reliable." Former Panamanian deputy health minister Hugo Spadafora, who had fought with the Contra army, outlined charges of cocaine trafficking to a prominent Panamanian official. Spadafora was later found murdered. Charges linked the Contra trafficking to Sebastián González Mendiola, who was charged with cocaine trafficking on November 26, 1984, in Costa Rica.

In 1985, another Contra leader "told U.S. authorities that his group was being paid $50,000 by Colombian traffickers for help with a 100 kilograms (220 lb) cocaine shipment and that the money would go 'for the cause' of fighting the Nicaraguan government." A 1985 National Intelligence Estimate by the CIA revealed cocaine trafficking links to a top commander working under Contra leader Edén Pastora.

Pastora had complained about such charges as early as March 1985, claiming that "two 'political figures' in Washington told him last week that State Department and CIA personnel were spreading the rumor that he is linked to drug trafficking in order to isolate his movement."

On December 20, 1985, these and other additional charges were laid out in an Associated Press article after an extensive investigation, which included interviews with "officials from the Drug Enforcement Administration (DEA), Customs Service, Federal Bureau of Investigation (FBI) and Costa Rica's Public Security Ministry, as well as rebels and Americans who work with them". Five American Contra supporters who worked with the rebels confirmed the charges, noting that "two Cuban-Americans used armed rebel troops to guard cocaine at clandestine airfields in northern Costa Rica. They identified the Cuban-Americans as members of Brigade 2506, an anti-Castro group that participated in the 1961 Bay of Pigs invasion of Cuba. Several also said they supplied information about the smuggling to U.S. investigators." One of the Americans said "that in one ongoing operation, the cocaine is unloaded from planes at rebel airstrips and taken to an Atlantic coast port where it is concealed on shrimp boats that are later unloaded in the Miami area."

On March 16, 1986, the San Francisco Examiner published a report on the "1983 seizure of 430 pounds (200 kg) of cocaine from a Colombian freighter" in San Francisco; it said that a "cocaine ring in the San Francisco Bay area helped finance Nicaragua's Contra rebels." Carlos Cabezas, convicted of conspiracy to traffic cocaine, said that the profits from his crimes "belonged to ... the Contra revolution." He told the Examiner, "I just wanted to get the Communists out of my country." Julio Zavala, also convicted on trafficking charges, said "that he supplied $500,000 to two Costa Rican-based Contra groups and that the majority of it came from cocaine trafficking in the San Francisco Bay area, Miami and New Orleans."

== FBI probe ==
In April 1986, Associated Press reported on an FBI probe into Contra cocaine trafficking. According to the report, "Twelve American, Nicaraguan and Cuban-American rebel backers interviewed by The Associated Press said they had been questioned over the past several months [about contra cocaine trafficking] by the FBI. In the interviews, some covering several days and being conducted in Florida, Alabama, Mississippi, Louisiana, Texas, Colorado and California, several of the Contra backers told AP of firsthand knowledge of cocaine trafficking."

On April 17, 1986, the Reagan administration released a three-page report stating that there were some Contra-cocaine connections in 1984 and 1985, and that these connections occurred at a time when the rebels were "particularly hard pressed for financial support" because aid from the United States had been cut off. The report said: "We have evidence of a limited number of incidents in which known drug traffickers have tried to establish connections with Nicaraguan resistance groups" and that the drug activity took place "without the authorization of resistance leaders."

== Kerry Committee investigation ==
Once you set up a covert operation to supply arms and money, it's very difficult to separate it from the kind of people who are involved in other forms of trade, and especially drugs. There is a limited number of planes, pilots and landing strips. By developing a system for supply of the Contras, the US built a road for drug supply into the US.

— Former contract analyst for the CIA David MacMichael

The U.S. Senate Foreign Relations Committee's Subcommittee on Terrorism, Narcotics, and International Operations, chaired at the time by Senator John Kerry, held a series of hearings from 1987 to 1988 on drug cartels and drug money laundering in South and Central America and the Caribbean.

The Subcommittee's final report, issued in 1989, said that Contra drug links included:

- Involvement in narcotics trafficking by individuals associated with the Contra movement.
- Participation of narcotics traffickers in Contra supply operations through business relationships with Contra organizations.
- Provision of assistance to the Contras by narcotics traffickers, including cash, weapons, planes, pilots, air supply services and other materials, on a voluntary basis by the traffickers.
- Payments to drug traffickers by the U.S. State Department of funds authorized by the Congress for humanitarian assistance to the Contras, in some cases after the traffickers had been indicted by federal law enforcement agencies on drug charges, in others while traffickers were under active investigation by these same agencies.

According to the report, the U.S. State Department paid over $806,000 to "four companies owned and operated by narcotics traffickers" to carry humanitarian assistance to the Contras.

== Dark Alliance series ==
From August 18–20, 1996, the San Jose Mercury News published the Dark Alliance series by Gary Webb, which claimed:

For the better part of a decade, a San Francisco Bay Area drug ring sold tons of cocaine to the Crips and Bloods street gangs of Los Angeles and funneled millions in drug profits to a Latin American guerrilla army run by the U.S. Central Intelligence Agency. [This drug ring] opened the first pipeline between Colombia's cocaine cartels and the black neighborhoods of Los Angeles [and, as a result,] the cocaine that flooded in helped spark a crack explosion in urban America.

To support these claims, the series focused on three men: Ricky Ross, Oscar Danilo Blandón, and Norwin Meneses. According to the series, Ross was a major drug dealer in Los Angeles, and Blandón and Meneses were Nicaraguans who smuggled drugs into the U.S. and supplied dealers like Ross. Ross was described as "a disillusioned 19-year-old ... who, at the dawn of the 1980s, found himself adrift on the streets of South-Central Los Angeles." The series alleged that Ross's suppliers had relationships with the Contras and the CIA, and that law enforcement agencies failed to successfully prosecute them largely due to their Contra and CIA connections.

Webb claimed that the connection between the groups was to fund the Contras' revolt against Nicaragua's leftist government. He concluded that Blandon worked with Ricky Ross to supply cocaine and low-cost crack to an untapped market of poor black citizens of Los Angeles.

The Mercury News claimed that drug dealers connected to the Contras were immune to investigation, with the implication that they were being protected by the CIA. The paper also contended that the DEA, Customs Bureau, the Los Angeles County Sheriff, or the U.S. Congress were all denied information from the CIA during an inquiry into the dealer-connected parties.

According to Webb, when the drug dealers lost their connection in the late 1980s, they were quickly arrested on drug charges.

=== Response ===
African Americans, especially in South Central Los Angeles where the dealers discussed in the series had been active, responded with outrage to the series' charges.

California senators Barbara Boxer and Dianne Feinstein also took note and wrote to CIA director John Deutch and Attorney General Janet Reno, asking for investigations into the articles. Maxine Waters, the Representative for California's 35th district, which includes South-Central Los Angeles, was also outraged by the articles and became one of Webb's strongest supporters. Waters urged the CIA, the Department of Justice, and the House Permanent Select Committee on Intelligence to investigate.

By the end of September, three federal investigations had been announced: an investigation into the CIA allegations conducted by CIA Inspector-General Frederick Hitz, an investigation into the law enforcement allegations by Justice Department Inspector-General Michael Bromwich, and a second investigation into the CIA by the House Intelligence Committee.

On October 3, 1996, LA County Sheriff Sherman Block ordered a fourth investigation into Webb's claims that a 1986 raid on Blandón's drug organization by the Los Angeles Sheriff's Department had produced evidence of CIA ties to drug smuggling and that this was later suppressed.

=== Coverage in other papers ===
In early October, 1996, a front-page article in The Washington Post by reporters Roberto Suro and Walter Pincus, argued that "available information" did not support the series's claims, and that "the rise of crack" was "a broad-based phenomenon" driven in numerous places by diverse players. The article also discussed Webb's contacts with Ross's attorney and prosecution complaints of how Ross's defense had used Webb's series.

The New York Times published two articles on the series in mid-October, both written by reporter Tim Golden. One described the series' evidence as "thin"; the second, citing interviews with current and former intelligence and law-enforcement officials, questioned the importance of the drug dealers discussed in the series, both in the crack cocaine trade and in supporting the Nicaraguan Contras' fight against the Sandinista government.

The Los Angeles Times devoted the most space to the story, developing its own three-part series called The Cocaine Trail. The series ran from October 20–22, 1996, and was researched by a team of 17 reporters. The three articles in the series were written by four reporters: Jesse Katz, Doyle McManus, John Mitchell, and Sam Fulwood. The first article, by Katz, developed a different picture of the origins of the crack trade than Dark Alliance had described, with more gangs and smugglers participating. The second article, by McManus, was the longest of the series, and dealt with the role of the Contras in the drug trade and CIA knowledge of drug activities by the Contras. McManus found Blandón and Meneses's financial contributions to Contra organizations to be significantly less than the "millions" claimed in Webb's series, and no evidence that the CIA had tried to protect them. The third article, by Mitchell and Fulwood, covered the effects of crack on African Americans and how it affected their reaction to some of the rumors that arose after the Dark Alliance series.

=== Mercury News response ===
Surprised by The Washington Post article, Mercury News executive editor Jerome Ceppos wrote to the Post defending the series. The Post ultimately refused to print his letter. Ceppos also asked reporter Pete Carey to write a critique of the series for publication in The Mercury News, and had the controversial website artwork changed. Carey's critique appeared in mid-October and went through several of the Post criticisms of the series, including the importance of Blandón's drug ring in spreading crack, questions about Blandón's testimony in court, and how specific series allegations about CIA involvement had been, giving Webb's responses.

When the Los Angeles Times series appeared, Ceppos again wrote to defend the original series. He also defended the series in interviews with all three papers. The extent of the criticism, however, convinced Ceppos that The Mercury News had to acknowledge to its readers that the series had not been subjected to strong criticism. He did this in a column that appeared on November 3, defending the series, but also committing the paper to a review of major criticisms.

Ceppos' column drew editorial responses from both The New York Times and The Washington Post. An editorial in the Times, while criticizing the series for making "unsubstantiated charges", conceded that it did find "drug-smuggling and dealing by Nicaraguans with at least tentative connections to the Contras" and called for further investigation.

The Post response came from the paper's ombudsman, Geneva Overholser. Overholser was harshly critical of the series, "reported by a seemingly hotheaded fellow willing to have people leap to conclusions his reporting couldn't back up." But while calling the flaws in the series "unforgivably careless journalism", Overholser also criticized the Post's refusal to print Ceppos' letter defending the series and sharply criticized the Post's coverage of the story. Calling the Post's overall focus "misplaced", Overholser expressed regret that the paper had not taken the opportunity to re-examine whether the CIA had overlooked Contra involvement in drug smuggling, "a subject The Post and the public had given short shrift."

In contrast, the series received support from Steve Weinberg, a former executive director of Investigative Reporters and Editors. In a long review of the series' claims in The Baltimore Sun, Weinberg said: "I think the critics have been far too harsh. Despite some hyped phrasing, 'Dark Alliance' appears to be praiseworthy investigative reporting."

After the series' publication, the Northern California branch of the national Society of Professional Journalists had voted Webb "Journalist of the Year" for 1996. Despite the controversy that soon overtook the series, and the request of one board member to reconsider, the branch's board went ahead with the award in November.

=== End of the series ===
After Ceppos' column, The Mercury News spent the next several months conducting an internal review of the story. The review was conducted primarily by editor Jonathan Krim and reporter Pete Carey, who had written the paper's first published analysis of the series. Carey ultimately decided that there were problems with several parts of the story and wrote a draft article incorporating his findings.

The paper also gave Webb permission to visit Central America again to get more evidence supporting the story. By January, Webb filed drafts of four more articles based on his trip, but his editors concluded that the new articles would not help shore up the original series' claims. The editors met with Webb several times in February to discuss the results of the paper's internal review and eventually decided to print neither Carey's draft article nor the articles Webb had filed. Webb was allowed to keep working on the story and made one more trip to Nicaragua in March.

At the end of March, however, Ceppos told Webb that he was going to present the internal review findings in a column. After discussions with Webb, the column was published on May 11, 1997. In the column Ceppos continued to defend parts of the article, writing that the series had "solidly documented" that the drug ring described in the series did have connections with the Contras and did sell large quantities of cocaine in inner-city Los Angeles.

But, Ceppos wrote, the series "did not meet our standards" in four areas. 1) It presented only one interpretation of conflicting evidence and in one case "did not include information that contradicted a central assertion of the series." 2) The series' estimates of the money involved was presented as fact instead of an estimate. 3) The series oversimplified how the crack epidemic grew. 4) The series "created impressions that were open to misinterpretation" through "imprecise language and graphics."

Ceppos noted that Webb did not agree with these conclusions. He concluded: "How did these shortcomings occur? ... I believe that we fell short at every step of our process: in the writing, editing and production of our work. Several people here share that burden ... But ultimately, the responsibility was, and is, mine."

== Investigation after Dark Alliance ==
=== Justice Department report ===
The Department of Justice Inspector-General's report was released on July 23, 1998. According to the report's "Epilogue", the report was completed in December 1997 but was not released because the DEA was still attempting to use Danilo Blandón in an investigation of international drug dealers and was concerned that the report would affect the viability of the investigation. When Attorney General Janet Reno determined that a delay was no longer necessary, the report was released unchanged.

The report covered actions by Department of Justice employees in the Federal Bureau of Investigation, the DEA, the Immigration and Naturalization Service, and U.S. Attorneys' Offices. It found that "the allegations contained in the original Mercury News articles were exaggerations of the actual facts." After examining the investigations and prosecutions of the main figures in the series, Blandón, Meneses and Ross, it concluded: "Although the investigations suffered from various problems of communication and coordination, their successes and failures were determined by the normal dynamics that affect the success of scores of investigations of high-level drug traffickers ... These factors, rather than anything as spectacular as a systematic effort by the CIA or any other intelligence agency to protect the drug trafficking activities of Contra supporters, determined what occurred in the cases we examined."

It also concluded that "the claims that Blandón and Meneses were responsible for introducing crack cocaine into South Central Los Angeles and spreading the crack epidemic throughout the country were unsupported." Although it did find that both men were major drug dealers, "guilty of enriching themselves at the expense of countless drug users", and that they had contributed money to the Contra cause, "we did not find that their activities were responsible for the crack cocaine epidemic in South Central Los Angeles, much less the rise of crack throughout the nation, or that they were a significant source of support for the Contras."

The report called several of its findings "troubling." It found that Blandón received permanent resident status "in a wholly improper manner" and that for some time the Department "was not certain whether to prosecute Meneses, or use him as a cooperating witness." Regarding issues raised in the series' shorter sidebar stories, it found that some in the government were "not eager" to have DEA agent Celerino Castillo "openly probe" activities at Ilopango Airport in El Salvador, where covert operations in support of the Contras were undertaken, and that the CIA had indeed intervened in a case involving smuggler Julio Zavala. It concluded, however, that these problems were "a far cry from the type of broad manipulation and corruption of the federal criminal justice system suggested by the original allegations."

=== CIA report ===
The CIA Inspector-General's report was issued in two volumes. The first one, "The California Story", was issued in a classified version on December 17, 1997, and in an unclassified version on January 29, 1998. The second volume, "The Contra Story", was issued in a classified version on April 27, 1998, and in an unclassified version on October 8, 1998.

In October 1996, Arlen Specter opened hearings that investigated the claims that the CIA was contributing to drug trafficking to fund the Nicaraguan Contras. Eden Pastora the Sandinista rebel leader turned Contra and eventual politician, claimed that he received payments from Oscar Danilo Blandón, who was a drug dealer in Southern California. He went on to claim that he received money from other traffickers in Miami during his time with the Contras, but that he did not know those contributing to the Contras were involved in illegal activities.

According to Specter, Blandón testified in a closed-door session that he had started to traffic drugs in Southern California in 1981 to earn money for the Contras, and that Blandón did not contact the CIA, nor did the CIA have any involvement with Blandón's drug trafficking activities.

According to the report, the Inspector-General's office (OIG) examined all information the agency had "relating to CIA knowledge of drug trafficking allegations in regard to any person directly or indirectly involved in Contra activities." It also examined "how CIA handled and responded to information regarding allegations of drug trafficking" by people involved in Contra activities or support.

The first volume of the report found no evidence that "any past or present employee of CIA, or anyone acting on behalf of CIA, had any direct or indirect dealing" with Ross, Blandón, or Meneses or that any of the other figures mentioned in Dark Alliance were ever employed by or associated with or contacted by the agency.

It found nothing to support the claim that "the drug trafficking activities of Blandón and Meneses were motivated by any commitment to support the Contra cause or Contra activities undertaken by CIA." It noted that Blandón and Meneses claimed to have donated money to Contra sympathizers in Los Angeles, but found no information to confirm that it was true or that the agency had heard of it.

It found no information to support the claim that the agency interfered with law enforcement actions against Ross, Blandón or Meneses.

In the 623rd paragraph, the report described a cable from the CIA's Directorate of Operations dated October 22, 1982, describing a prospective meeting between Contra leaders in Costa Rica for "an exchange in [the United States] of narcotics for arms, which then are shipped to Nicaragua." The two main Contra groups, US arms dealers, and a lieutenant of a drug ring which imported drugs from Latin America to the US west coast were set to attend the Costa Rica meeting. The lieutenant trafficker was also a Contra, and the CIA knew that there was an arms-for-drugs shuttle and did nothing to stop it.

The report stated that the CIA had requested the Justice Department return $36,800 to a member of the Meneses drug ring, which had been seized by DEA agents in the Frogman raid in San Francisco. The CIA's Inspector General said the Agency wanted the money returned "to protect an operational equity, i.e., a Contra support group in which it [CIA] had an operational interest."

The report also stated that former DEA agent Celerino Castillo alleged that during the 1980s, Ilopango Airport in El Salvador was used by Contras for drug smuggling flights, and "his attempts to investigate Contra drug smuggling were stymied by DEA management, the U.S. Embassy in El Salvador, and the CIA".

During a PBS Frontline investigation, DEA field agent Hector Berrellez said, "I believe that elements working for the CIA were involved in bringing drugs into the country."

"I know specifically that some of the CIA contract workers, meaning some of the pilots, in fact were bringing drugs into the U.S. and landing some of these drugs in government air bases. And I know so because I was told by some of these pilots that in fact they had done that."

=== Testimony of the CIA Inspector General ===
Six weeks after the declassified and heavily censored first volume of the CIA report was made public, Inspector General Frederick Hitz testified before a House congressional committee. Hitz stated that:

Volume II ... will be devoted to a detailed treatment of what was known to CIA regarding dozens of people and a number of companies connected in some fashion to the Contra program or the Contra movement that were the subject of any sort of drug trafficking allegations. Each is closely examined in terms of their relationship with CIA, the drug trafficking activity that was alleged, the actions CIA took in response to the allegations, and the extent of information concerning the allegations that was Shared with U.S. law enforcement and Congress. As I said earlier, we have found no evidence in the course of this lengthy investigation of any conspiracy by CIA or its employees to bring drugs into the United States. However, during the Contra era, CIA worked with a variety of people to support the Contra program. These included CIA assets, pilots who ferried supplies to the Contras, as well as Contra officials and others. Let me be frank about what we are finding. There are instances where CIA did not, in an expeditious or consistent fashion, cut off relationships with individuals supporting the Contra program who were alleged to have engaged in drug trafficking activity or take action to resolve the allegations.

Also revealed was a letter between the Attorney General William French Smith and the CIA that omitted narcotics violations among the list of crimes agency officers were required to report. In a follow-up letter later Smith stated "I have been advised that a question arose regarding the need to add all narcotics violations to the list of 'non-employee' crimes". Citing existing federal policy on narcotics enforcement, Smith wrote: "In light of these provisions and in view of the fine cooperation the Drug Enforcement Administration has received from CIA, no formal requirement regarding the reporting of narcotics violations has been included in these procedures."

This agreement, which had not previously been revealed, came at a time when there were allegations that the CIA was using drug dealers in its controversial covert operation to bring down the leftist Sandinista government in Nicaragua. In 1986, the agreement was modified to require the CIA to stop paying agents who it believed were involved in the drug trade.

=== House committee report ===
The House Intelligence Committee issued its report in February 2000. According to the report, it used Webb's reporting and writing as "key resources in focusing and refining the investigation". Like the CIA and Justice Department reports, it also found that neither Blandón, Meneses, nor Ross were associated with the CIA.

Examining the support that Meneses and Blandón gave to the local Contra organization in San Francisco, the report concluded that it was "not sufficient to finance the organization" and did not consist of 'millions', contrary to the claims of the Dark Alliance series. This support "was not directed by anyone within the Contra movement who had an association with the CIA," and the Committee found "no evidence that the CIA or the Intelligence Community was aware of these individuals' support". It also found no evidence to support Webb's suggestion that several other drug smugglers mentioned in the series were associated with the CIA, or that anyone associated with the CIA or other intelligence agencies was involved in supplying or selling drugs in Los Angeles.

== See also ==
- Allegations of CIA drug trafficking
- Human rights violations by the CIA
- Kiki Camarena
- War on drugs
- Coca
