= Jerome Ceppos =

American journalist (1946–2022)

Jerry Ceppos
- Born: Jerome Merle Ceppos; October 14, 1946; Washington, D.C., U.S.
- Died: July 29, 2022 (aged 75); Baton Rouge, Louisiana, U.S.
- Education: University of Maryland
- Occupations: Journalist, news executive, educator
- Employer: Louisiana State University
- Known for: Dark Alliance controversy
- Spouse: Karen Feingold (m. 1982)
- Children: 2
- Awards: Fellow, Society of Professional Journalists

Jerome Merle Ceppos (October 14, 1946 – July 29, 2022) was an American journalist, news executive, and educator. In 1996, he drew criticism for failing to defend his colleague Gary Webb after Webb's publication of "Dark Alliance," a series of investigative reports, which linked the CIA and the Contras to the U.S. crack epidemic. He received professional plaudits for apologizing for the journalistic shortcomings of the series.

Ceppos served as editor of the San Jose Mercury News and the dean of the Manship School of Mass Communication at Louisiana State University.

== Early life and education ==
Ceppos was born on October 14, 1946, in Washington, D.C., and grew up in Silver Spring, Maryland. He attended Northwood High School, where he edited The Red and Black, the high school newspaper.

He attended the University of Maryland, where he was editor of The Diamondback, the school's independent student newspaper, joined SDX, now the Society of Professional Journalists, and was inducted into Omicron Delta Kappa. In 1969, he graduated with a BA in journalism.

== Career ==
=== Gannett ===
Ceppos's first full-time professional position was at the Rochester Democrat and Chronicle, where he served as a reporter, assistant city editor, and night city editor from 1969 and 1972.

=== Knight-Ridder ===
In 1972, he joined the Miami Herald, where he was its assistant city editor and later became its first national foreign editor and assistant managing editor for news.

In 1981, he moved to the San Jose Mercury News, where he was associate editor, managing editor, senior vice president, and executive editor. During his time as managing editor, the San Jose Mercury News won two Pulitzer Prizes. He also initiated a Vietnamese language edition, Viet Mercury, and a Spanish language edition, Nuevo Mundo. He supported digital initiatives at a print journalism company and successfully championed diversity hiring.

In 1999, he became vice president for news at Knight-Ridder, then the second-largest newspaper chain in the United States, where he worked until 2005.

=== University of Nevada, Reno ===
From 2008 to 2011, Ceppos was dean and professor at the Reynolds School in Journalism at the University of Nevada, Reno, where he held the Fred W. Smith Chair in Journalism. As incoming dean, he commissioned a large banner with the words of the First Amendment to hang in the school. He continued his professional goals by increasing diversity hiring and changing the curriculum to require cross-platform training for all students.

=== Louisiana State University ===
In July 2011, Ceppos became dean and William B. Dickinson Distinguished Professor at the Manship School of Mass Communication at Louisiana State University. He repeated his display of the First Amendment and moved the curriculum toward online media. He taught media ethics. He stepped down as dean at the end of the 2017–2018 academic year. He continued to teach "Media Writing," "Media Management," and "Media Ethics and Social Responsibility."

=== Other work ===
From 2006 to 2007, Ceppos was a consultant with Leading Edge Associates, a management consulting firm in San Jose, California. In 2007, he was a fellow in media ethics at the Markkula Center for Applied Ethics at Santa Clara University.

== Controversies ==
=== Dark alliance ===
Gary Webb, a reporter for The Mercury News, was hired in 1987 when Ceppos was executive editor. Webb conducted a year-long investigation of cocaine dealing in Los Angeles, which was published in The Mercury News in three segments between August 18 and August 20, 1996, under the title "Dark Alliance." Initial praise for the series was followed by criticism from major media outlets, including The New York Times, The Washington Post, and The Los Angeles Times. After initially defending the series, Ceppos commissioned an internal review. At the end of March 1997, Ceppos told Webb that he was going to publish the internal review findings in a column, which appeared on May 11, 1997.

Ceppos took personal responsibility for the series and its flaws in his opening sentence, writing, "Few things in life are harder than owning up to one's shortcomings, but I need to tell you about an important case in which I believe that we fell short of my standards for the Mercury News." In the column, Ceppos continued to defend parts of the series, writing that it had "solidly documented" that the drug ring described in the series did have connections with the Contras and sold large quantities of cocaine in inner-city Los Angeles. But, Ceppos wrote, the series "did not meet our standards" in four areas. 1) It presented only one interpretation of conflicting evidence and in one case "did not include information that contradicted a central assertion of the series." 2) The series' estimates of the money involved was presented as fact instead of an estimate. 3) The series oversimplified how the crack epidemic grew. 4) The series "created impressions that were open to misinterpretation" through "imprecise language and graphics."

Ceppos noted that Webb did not agree with these conclusions. His column concluded, asking, "How did these shortcomings occur? ... I believe that we fell short at every step of our process: in the writing, editing and production of our work. Several people here share that burden ... But ultimately, the responsibility was, and is, mine."

Ceppos's mea culpa won praise in the journalism profession. He was awarded, along with two others, the first Ethics in Journalism award from the Society of Professional Journalists for "superior ethical conduct."

Critics suggested Ceppos had caved to outside pressure, including that of the government and its agencies.

The 2014 film Kill the Messenger was based on the controversy, with Oliver Platt playing Ceppos. Opinions about the movie paralleled those about the original series. There was controversy as to whether Ceppos had been contacted or not regarding the factual aspects of the movie.

Webb was found dead in his Carmichael, California home on December 10, 2004, with two gunshot wounds to the head. His death was ruled a suicide by the Sacramento County coroner's office.

=== Pre-publication review ===
In August 1998, a financial story by Chris Schmitt was shared in its entirety with Nasdaq for fact-checking prior to publication. Changes were made prior to publication. This departure from standard journalism practice raised ethical questions regarding the relationship between journalists and the subjects they cover, who are not assumed to have control over the content of publication.

== Death ==
Ceppos died at his home in Baton Rouge, Louisiana, on July 29, 2022, at age 75.

== Media ==
=== Publications ===
- Jerry Ceppos, "Hope to be found in optimism of the young," The.Advocate.Com, April 6, 2020.
- Jerry Ceppos, John Maxwell, and Martin Johnson. "How journalists can win back Americans' trust," mercurynews.com, August 24, 2018.
- Jerry Ceppos, John Maxwell, and Martin Johnson. "How journalists can win back Americans' trust," eastbaytimes.com, August 24, 2018.
- Jerry Ceppos, "Chapter Four: How We Got Here and What It Means for New Orleans News Consumers," News Evolution or Revolution?: The Future of Print Journalism in the Digital Age by Andrea Miller and Amy Reynolds, (Peter Lang Publishing Inc., 2014).
- Jerry Ceppos, "Foreword," Moral Reasoning for Journalists, by Steve Knowlton and Bill Reader, 2nd revised edition, 2009.
- Arthur S. Hayes, Jane B. Singer and Jerry Ceppos, “Shifting Roles, Enduring Values: The Credible Journalist in a Digital Age,” Journal of Mass Media Ethics, 22:(4), 262–279, 2007.
- Jerry Ceppos, "A plea from minority journalists: give us some feedback." American Journalism Review, vol. 16, no. 7, 1994, p. 16+. Gale Academic OneFile, Accessed 8 June 2020.

=== Electronic media ===
- Ceppos: Post-Deanship. May 20, 2018.
- Words of Encouragement from Former Dean Jerry Ceppos, March 28, 2020.
- Celebrating Dean Jerry Ceppos. May 11, 2018.
- Manship Minute: Jerry Ceppos, March 12, 2018.
- WRKF. June 20, 2017.
- Dean Ceppos Portrayed in New Film "Kill the Messenger, October 11, 2014.
- KLSU Bracket Challenge, March 19, 2014.
- Jerry Ceppos on J-School. September 7, 2011.
- The 1964 Daisy Girl Advertisement. C-SPAN. April 6, October 24, 2011.
- The Daily Reveille: Interview with Jerry Ceppos. August 24, 2011.
- Fairness in Journalism, American Society of Newspaper Editors. C-SPAN. April 6, 2001.
- Media Credibility, American Society of Newspaper Editors. C-SPAN. April 1, 1998.

== Memberships and honors ==
- Advisory board, LSU Museum
- Member and past president, Accrediting Council on Education in Journalism and Mass Communications
- Fellow, Society of Professional Journalists, 2016
- Judge, Scripps Howard Foundation Awards, 2016
- Judge, Katherine Schneider Journalism Award for Excellence in Reporting on Disability, 2013–2019
- Advisory board, National Center on Disability and Journalism, 2013–2019
- Recipient, Carr Van Anda Award for Enduring Contributions to Journalism, Ohio University, 2006
- Judge, ASNE Awards, 2004, 2005
- Recipient, ASJMC Gerald M. Sass Distinguished Service Award, 2002
- President, Associated Press Managing Editors, 2000
- Recipient, Ethics in Journalism Award, Society of Professional Journalists, 1997
- Recipient, Anti-Defamation League Torch of Liberty Award, 1997
- Juror, Pulitzer Prize, 1997
- Former member, Board of Visitors, Philip Merrill College of Journalism, University of Maryland

== See also ==
- CIA involvement in Contra cocaine trafficking
- Knight Ridder
