= John M. Deutch =

American civil servant and physical chemist (born 1938)

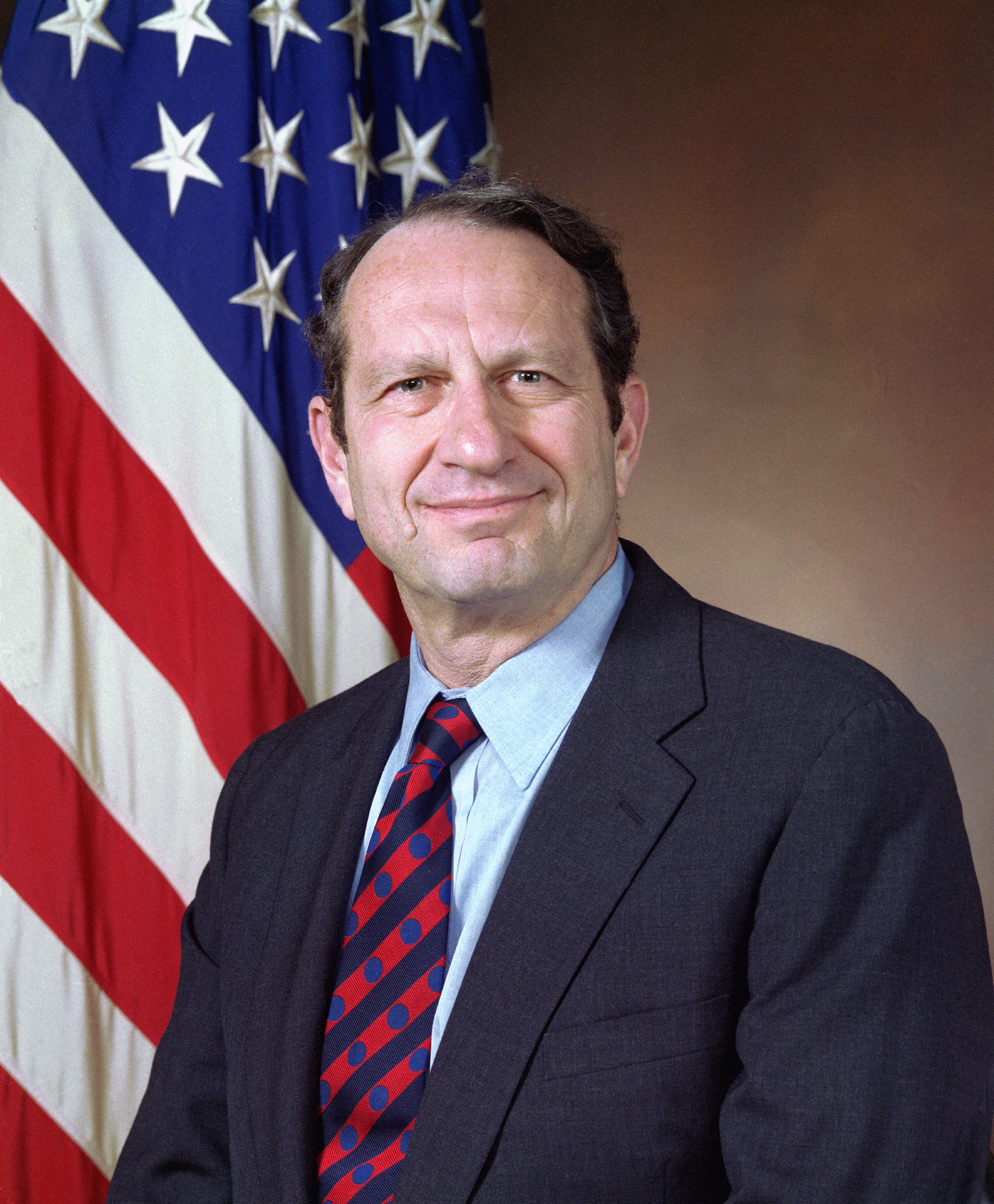

17th Director of Central Intelligence
- In office May 10, 1995 – December 15, 1996
- President: Bill Clinton
- Deputy: William O. Studeman; George Tenet
- Preceded by: James Woolsey
- Succeeded by: George Tenet

24th United States Deputy Secretary of Defense
- In office March 11, 1994 – May 10, 1995
- President: Bill Clinton
- Preceded by: William Perry
- Succeeded by: John P. White

Under Secretary of Defense for Acquisition and Technology
- In office April 2, 1993 – March 11, 1994
- President: Bill Clinton
- Preceded by: Donald Yockey
- Succeeded by: Paul G. Kaminski

Personal details
- Born: John Mark Deutch; July 27, 1938 (age 88) Brussels, Belgium
- Spouses: Samayla Dodek (m. 1961; div. 1985) Patricia Lyon Martin (m. 1995)
- Children: 3 (with Dodek)
- Education: Amherst College (BA); Massachusetts Institute of Technology (MS, PhD)

John Mark Deutch (born July 27, 1938) is an American civil servant and physical chemist. He was the United States Deputy Secretary of Defense from 1994 to 1995 and Director of Central Intelligence (DCI) from May 10, 1995, until December 15, 1996. He is an emeritus Institute Professor at the Massachusetts Institute of Technology (MIT) and serves on the boards of directors of Citigroup, Cummins, Raytheon, and Schlumberger. Deutch is also a member of the Trilateral Commission.

== Background ==
Deutch was born in Brussels, Belgium, the son of Rachel Felicia (Fischer) and Michael Joseph Deutch. He is of Russian Jewish heritage, and became a United States citizen in 1945. He graduated from the Sidwell Friends School in Washington, D.C. and earned a bachelor's degree in history and economics from Amherst College. In 1961, Deutch earned a Master of Science degree in chemical engineering and, in 1966, he earned a PhD in chemistry, both from the Massachusetts Institute of Technology (MIT). He holds honorary degrees from Amherst College, University of Massachusetts Lowell, and Northeastern University.

From 1977 to 1980, he served in several positions at the United States Department of Energy (DOE), including as director of energy research, acting assistant secretary for energy technology, and undersecretary of the department. In 1978, Deutch published two physical chemistry papers (in Combustion and Flame, 1978, vol 231 pp. 215–221 and 223-229) on modeling the mechanism of the fuel/air mixture. He served as the provost of MIT from 1985 to 1990. As MIT's dean of science and provost, Deutch oversaw the disbanding of the department of applied biological sciences, including its toxicology faculty. Furthermore, in December 2012, he was elected to the Board of Trustees for the MIT-Russia Skolkovo Institute of Science and Technology.

== Director of Central Intelligence tenure ==
In 1995, President Bill Clinton appointed him Director of Central Intelligence. As Deutch was initially reluctant to accept the appointment, the position was conferred with Cabinet rank, a prerequisite ultimately retained by successor George Tenet through the end of the Clinton administration. At the time of his appointment, The New York Times quoted activist Noam Chomsky, a prominent critic of U.S. foreign policy and of the CIA, as saying, "He has more honesty and integrity than anyone I've ever met in academic life, or any other life... If somebody's got to be running the C.I.A., I'm glad it's him."

As head of the CIA, Deutch continued the policy of his predecessor R. James Woolsey to declassify records pertaining to U.S. covert operations during the Cold War.

In 1996, Deutch took the unusual step of traveling to Locke High School in Los Angeles to address reports that the CIA had facilitated the introduction of crack cocaine into Los Angeles. Speaking to a hostile crowd, Deutch denied any connection between the CIA and cocaine traffic in Los Angeles and vowed to open an investigation. The meeting was prompted by allegations published by journalist Gary Webb that connected the CIA to the California cocaine trade and trafficker Danilo Blandón.

Deutch fell out of favor with the Clinton administration because of public testimony he gave to Congress on Iraq. Specifically, Deutch testified that Saddam Hussein was stronger than he had been four years earlier and that the CIA might never be able to remedy the issue. After he won reelection, Clinton replaced Deutch.

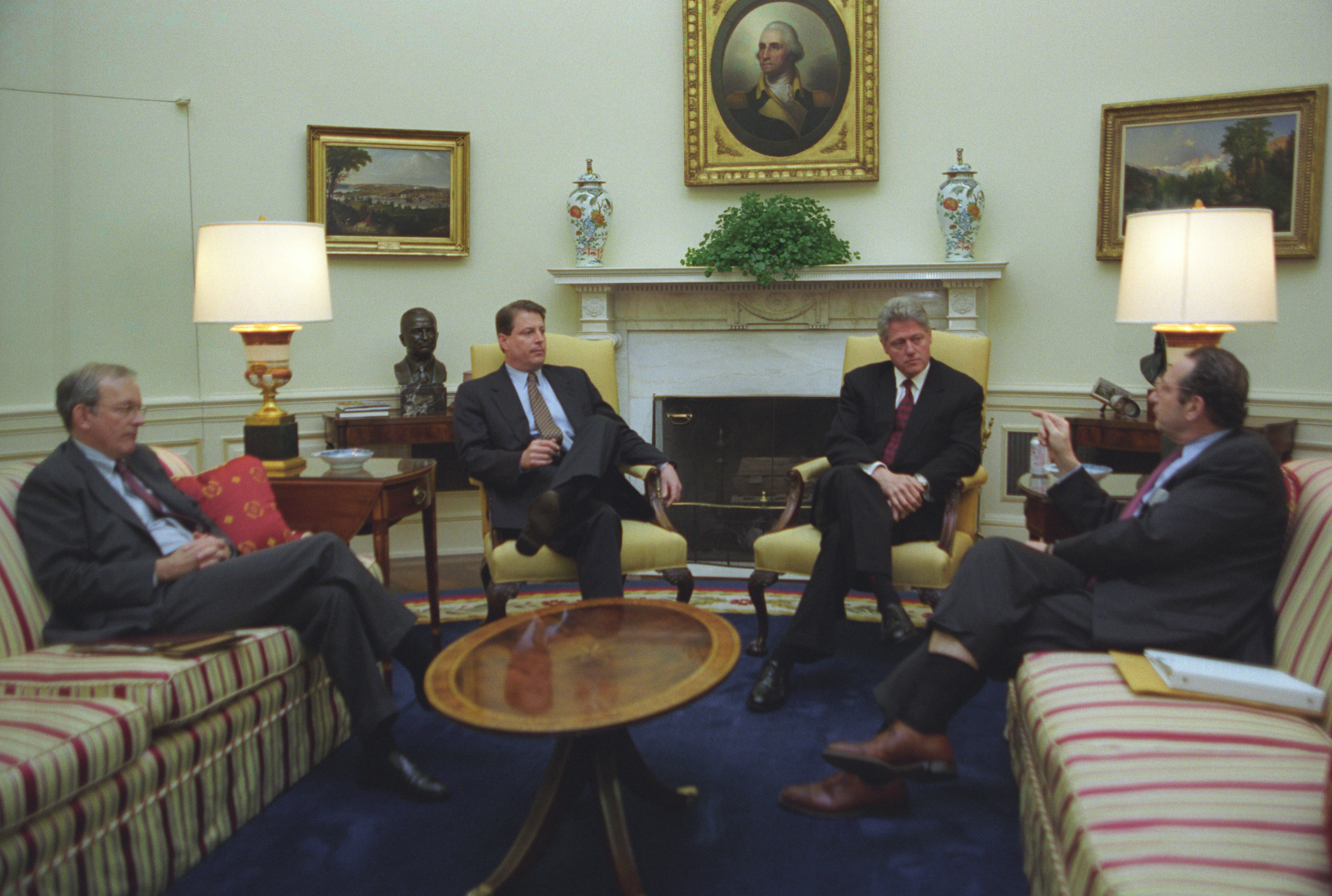
Deutch meeting with President Clinton to discuss Bosnia in 1996

Deutch left the CIA on December 15, 1996. Soon after, it was revealed that several of his laptop computers contained classified information wrongfully labeled as unclassified. In January 1997, the CIA began a formal security investigation of the matter. Senior management at CIA declined to fully pursue the security breach. Over two years after his departure, the matter was referred to the Department of Justice, where Attorney General Janet Reno declined prosecution. She did, however, recommend an investigation to determine whether Deutch should retain his security clearance. Deutch had agreed to plead guilty to a misdemeanor for mishandling government secrets on January 19, 2001, but President Clinton pardoned him on his last day in office, two days before the Justice Department could file the case against him.

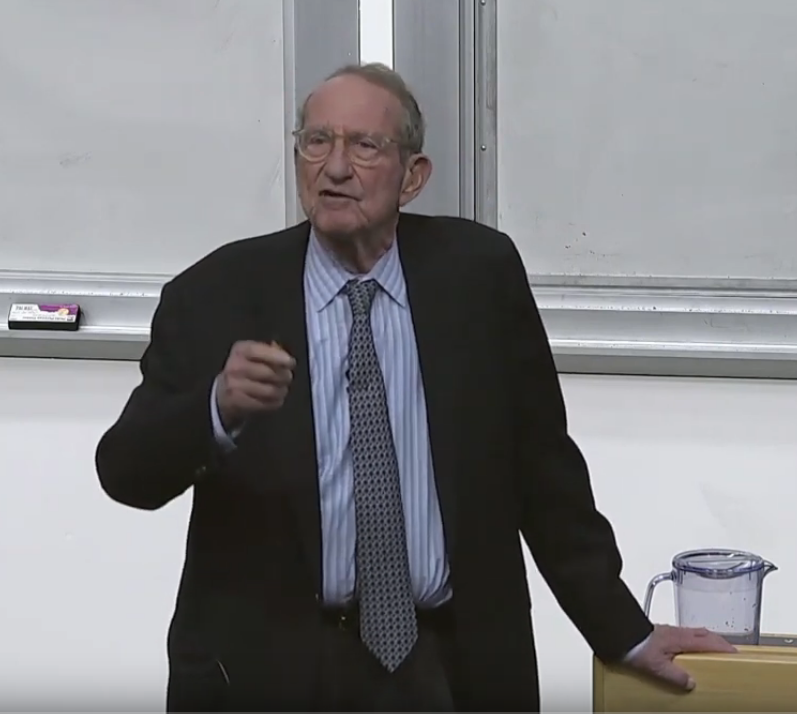
Deutch teaching at M.I.T., 2020.

== Board memberships and fellowships ==
Deutch was elected to the American Academy of Arts and Sciences in 1978 and to the American Philosophical Society in 2007. He has been a member of the National Petroleum Council since 2008 and the Secretary of DOE Energy Advisory Board since 2010. In 1988, Deutch was elected as a fellow of the National Academy of Public Administration.

He has served as a Trustee at the Museum of Fine Arts in Boston.

== See also ==
- List of people pardoned or granted clemency by the president of the United States

== Sources ==
Political offices
Preceded by William Perry	United States Deputy Secretary of Defense; 1994–1995	Succeeded by John White
Government offices
Preceded by James Woolsey	Director of Central Intelligence; 1995–1996	Succeeded by George Tenet
