= Kerry Committee =

Report on drug enforcement problems in South and Central America and the Caribbean

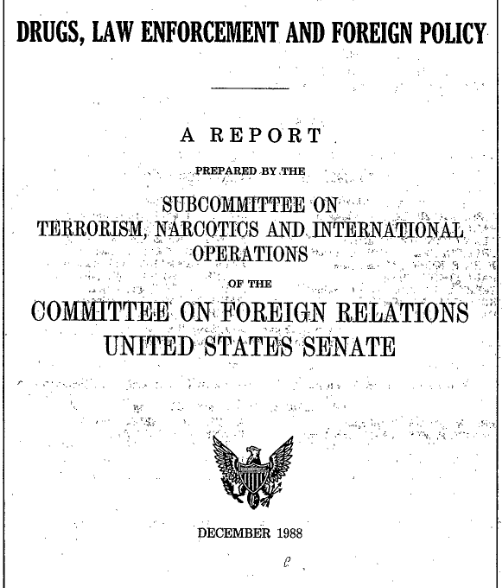
Cover of the Kerry Committee report

The Kerry Committee (formally the Subcommittee on Terrorism, Narcotics, and International Operations of the United States Senate Committee on Foreign Relations) was a US Senate subcommittee during the 100th United States Congress that examined the problems that drug cartels and drug money laundering in South and Central America and the Caribbean posed for American law enforcement and foreign policy. The Sub-Committee was chaired at the time by Democratic Party Senator John Kerry from Massachusetts so the name of the committee and the report are often referred to under his name.

== Background ==
Press accounts concerning links between the Contras and drug traffickers, which began with a December 1985 story by the Associated Press, led to a review by the United States Department of State, U.S. Department of Justice and relevant U.S. intelligence agencies in 1986. In April 1986, the State Department informed Congress that it had "evidence of a limited number of incidents in which known drug traffickers tried to establish connections with Nicaraguan resistance groups."

Kerry was not selected to be on the Iran–Contra committee, but was reported to be offered the chairmanship of the Subcommittee on Terrorism, Narcotics, and International Operations as a consolation prize.

== Hearings begin ==
In April 1986, John Kerry and Christopher Dodd, a fellow Democrat from Connecticut, proposed that hearings be conducted by the Senate Foreign Relations Committee regarding charges of Contra involvement in cocaine and marijuana trafficking. Senator Richard Lugar of Indiana, the Republican chairman of the committee, agreed to conduct the hearings.

== Findings ==
The Kerry Committee report, formally titled Drugs, Law Enforcement and Foreign Policy, was the final report of the subcommittee. The report was released on April 13, 1989, and included discussions of drug trafficking in the Bahamas, Colombia, Cuba and Nicaragua, Haiti, Honduras, and Panama. The longest chapter in the report was on narcotics trafficking and the Nicaraguan Contras. The Subcommittee determined that there was "substantial evidence of drug smuggling... on the part of individual Contras, Contra suppliers, Contra pilots, mercenaries who worked with the Contras, and Contra supporters". It "did not find that Contra leaders were personally involved in drug trafficking".

The Kerry Committee report found that "the Contra drug links included... Payments to drug traffickers by the U.S. State Department of funds authorized by the Congress for humanitarian assistance to the Contras, in some cases after the traffickers had been indicted by federal law enforcement agencies on drug charges, in others while traffickers were under active investigation by these same agencies."

== Reception ==
The report did not initially receive significant news coverage. Some of its allegations were reintroduced into public discourse during the 1996 series Dark Alliance by reporter Gary Webb at The San Jose Mercury News. Oliver North publicly denounced the report. Peter Kornbluh said that North mischaracterized what the report claimed and that North's own diaries (released in 2004) show North was aware of the allegations surrounding the Contras and their supply network. North has said he passed on some of his suspicions of drug smuggling to the DEA. But a 1994 investigation by The Washington Post found no evidence that he had done so.

== See also ==
- Allegations of CIA drug trafficking
- CIA involvement in Contra cocaine trafficking
