= Kill the Messenger (Schou book) =

2006 biography by Nick Schou

Kill the Messenger: How the CIA's Crack-cocaine Controversy Destroyed Journalist Gary Webb
- First edition
- Author: Nick Schou
- Language: English
- Publisher: Nation Books
- Publication date: 2006
- Publication place: United States
- Media type: Print
- ISBN: 978-1-56025-930-5

Kill the Messenger: How the CIA's Crack-cocaine Controversy Destroyed Journalist Gary Webb (New York: Nation Books, 2006) is a biography of investigative journalist Gary Webb, focusing on his 1996 "Dark Alliance" investigative series in the San Jose Mercury News. The series linked the 1980s' crack cocaine trade in the United States and the CIA-backed Nicaraguan Contras.

Kill the Messenger was adapted into a 2014 film by the same name.

== Editions ==
- ISBN 978-1-56025-930-5 (2006)
- ISBN 978-0-78673-526-6 (2009)
- ISBN 978-1-56858-471-3 (2014)
