= Multiple gunshot suicide =

Suicide method

Multiple-gunshot suicide occurs when an individual commits suicide by inflicting multiple gunshots on themself before becoming incapacitated. It excludes suicides where the firearms are operated by other people, such as suicide by cop.

== Causes ==
Incapacitation from a gunshot injury results from a decrease in the functioning of the central nervous system. In a suicide by firearm, immediate incapacitation can be achieved by direct disruption to brain stem tissue. Rapid incapacitation can be achieved indirectly by cerebral hypoxemia resulting from massive bleeding from the heart, the thoracic aorta, or the pulmonary artery. Damage to other major organs – the lungs, kidneys, liver, spleen – results only in delayed incapacitation. Incapacitation by a shot to the head is achieved when the bullet penetrates the cerebrum; however, numerous bullet trajectories, including a shot between the eyes, do not achieve this penetration.

== Examples ==
Multiple-gunshot suicides are rare, but possible. In one study of 138 gunshot suicides, five (3.6%) involved two shots to the head, the first of which missed the brain. In 2012, a suicide was reported in which a man shot himself eight times in the head before he died 22 hours later.

One particular case has been documented from Australia. In February 1995, a man committed suicide on parkland in Canberra. He took a pump-action shotgun loaded with four 12-gauge No. 2 shot shell cartridges, and in a stooped position, pressed the muzzle into the centre of the chest before shooting himself. The load passed through the chest without entering the ribcage before exiting below the left nipple. The man then cycled the shotgun's action, ejecting the fired shell. He then walked 15 meters (49 ft) before shooting himself in the right side of the throat, with the charge exiting out of the left side and taking a fragment of jaw with it. At this point, the shotgun potentially fell to the ground causing the ejection of both the spent cartridge and one unspent cartridge. The man, now breathing through a gunshot-induced tracheostomy, picked up the shotgun and then walked 136 meters (446 ft) to a hill where he sat down on the slope and loaded the fourth cartridge from the magazine and into the weapon's breech. The man then removed his shoes and held the gun against his chest with his hands and operated the trigger with his toes. This shot entered the thoracic cavity and demolished the heart, killing him.

In 1978, poet Frank Stanford put three bullets into his own heart with a pistol. This inspired the Indigo Girls song "Three Hits". Other notable figures that died of multiple-gunshot suicides include Gary Webb and Yuriy Kravchenko, as well as the perpetrators of the Crandon shooting, the 2021 San Jose shooting, and the 1999 Independence Day weekend shootings.

== Conspiracy theories ==
Multiple-gunshot deaths of notable figures are known to fuel conspiracy theories among those who are unaware of the phenomenon. Following the two-gunshot death of Gary Webb, conspiracy theorists levied allegations that Webb was murdered.

== See also ==
- Elliott Smith
- List of unusual deaths
- Suicide attempt
