= Circulation Verification Council =

Periodical circulation auditor

- Company type: Private
- Industry: Auditing
- Founded: 1992
- Founder: Timothy Bingaman
- Headquarters: St. Louis, Missouri
- Website: www.cvcaudit.com

Circulation Verification Council (CVC) is an American company which acts as an independent, third-party auditor to create circulation data for various online and print periodicals. The company is headquartered in St. Louis, Missouri.

== Corporate history ==
In May 1992, Tim Bingaman founded the Circulation Verification Council as a for-profit company in St. Louis, Missouri. The company has partnered with other trade associations like the City and Regional Magazine Association and the Association of Community Publishers.

== Auditing ==
CVC serves as a third-party auditor for circulation data for newspapers, magazines, and other periodicals. The CVC uses a three-tier system, where companies report their print, distribution, and digital data for each quarter. Audits are conducted quarterly.

It conducted the first nationwide audit of Black and Hispanic newspapers in the United States.
