= Gary Webb =

American investigative journalist (1955–2004)

- Born: Gary Stephen Webb; August 31, 1955; Corona, California, U.S.
- Died: December 10, 2004 (aged 49); Carmichael, California, U.S.
- Cause of death: Suicide
- Education: Northern Kentucky University
- Occupation: Investigative journalist
- Years active: 1980–2004
- Notable credit(s): Cleveland Plain Dealer; San Jose Mercury News
- Spouse: Susan Bell (m. 1979; div. 2000)
- Children: 3

Gary Stephen Webb (August 31, 1955 – December 10, 2004) was an American investigative journalist.

Webb began his career working for newspapers in Kentucky and Ohio, winning numerous awards, and building a reputation for investigative writing. Hired by the San Jose Mercury News, Webb contributed to the paper's Pulitzer Prize-winning coverage of the Loma Prieta earthquake.

Webb is best known for his "Dark Alliance" series, which appeared in The Mercury News in 1996. The series examined the origins of the crack cocaine trade in Los Angeles and claimed that members of the anti-communist Contra rebels in Nicaragua had played a major role in creating the trade, using cocaine profits to finance their fight against the government in Nicaragua. It also stated that the Contras may have acted with the knowledge and protection of the Central Intelligence Agency (CIA). The series provoked outrage, particularly in the Los Angeles African-American community, and led to four major investigations of its charges.

The Los Angeles Times and other major papers published articles suggesting the "Dark Alliance" claims were overstated and, in November 1996, Jerome Ceppos, the executive editor at Mercury News, wrote about being "in the eye of the storm". In May 1997, after an internal review, Ceppos stated that, although the story was correct on many important points, there were shortcomings in the writing, editing, and production of the series. He wrote that the series likely "oversimplified" the crack epidemic in America and the supposed "critical role" the dealers written about in the series played in it. Webb disagreed with this conclusion.

Webb resigned from The Mercury News in December 1997. He became an investigator for the California State Legislature, published a book based on the "Dark Alliance" series in 1998, and did freelance investigative reporting. He died on December 10, 2004. His death was ruled a suicide by the Sacramento County Coroner’s office, which his family accepts. There were rumors at the time that his death was retribution for his "Dark Alliance" series.

The "Dark Alliance" series remains controversial. Critics view the series's claims as inaccurate or overstated, while supporters point to the results of a later CIA investigation as vindicating the series. The follow-up reporting in the Los Angeles Times and other papers has been criticized for focusing on problems in the series rather than re-examining the earlier CIA-Contra claims.

== Early life and education ==
Webb was born in Corona, California. His father was a Marine sergeant, and the family moved frequently, as his career took him to new assignments. When Webb's father retired from the Marines, the family settled in a suburb of Indianapolis, where Webb and his brother attended high school.

After high school, Webb attended a community college in Indianapolis on a scholarship until his family moved to Cincinnati, when he then transferred to nearby Northern Kentucky University.

Webb first began writing for the student newspaper at his college in Indianapolis. After transferring to Northern Kentucky, he entered its journalism program and wrote for the school paper, The Northerner. Although he attended Northern Kentucky for four years, he did not finish his degree. Instead, he found work in 1978 as a reporter at the Kentucky Post, a local paper affiliated with the larger Cincinnati Post. In 1979, Webb married Susan Bell; the couple went on to have three children.

== Career ==
Webb's first major investigative work appeared in 1980, when The Cincinnati Post published "The Coal Connection," a seventeen-part series by Webb and Post reporter Thomas Scheffey. The series, which examined the murder of a coal company president with ties to organized crime, won the national Investigative Reporters and Editors Award for reporting from a small newspaper.

In 1983, Webb moved to the Cleveland Plain Dealer, where he continued doing investigative work. A 1985 series, "Doctoring the Truth," uncovered problems in the State Medical Board and led to an Ohio House investigation which resulted in major revisions to the state Medical Practice Act. Webb then moved to the paper's statehouse bureau, where he covered statewide issues and won numerous regional journalism awards. In 1984, Webb wrote a story titled “Driving Off With Profits” which claimed that the promoters of a race in Cleveland paid themselves nearly a million dollars from funds that should have gone to the city of Cleveland. The article resulted in a lawsuit against Webb's paper which the plaintiffs won. A jury awarded the plaintiffs over 13 million dollars and the case was later settled. In 1986, Webb wrote an article saying that the Chief Justice of the Ohio Supreme Court, Frank D. Celebrezze accepted contributions from groups with organized crime connections. Celebrezze eventually sued the Plain Dealer and won an undisclosed out of court settlement.

In 1988, Webb was recruited by the San Jose Mercury News, which was looking for an investigative reporter. He was assigned to its Sacramento bureau, where he was allowed to choose most of his own stories. As part of The Mercury News team that covered the 1989 Loma Prieta earthquake, Webb and his colleague Pete Carey wrote a story examining the causes of the collapse of the Cypress Street Viaduct. The Mercury News's coverage of the earthquake won its staff the Pulitzer Prize for General News Reporting in 1990.

== Dark Alliance series ==
Webb's remarks on the Iran-Contra affair, delivered at the 1999 Committee on Political Assassination (COPA) Conference.
- Video on YouTube

Webb began researching "Dark Alliance" in July 1995. The series was published in The Mercury News in three parts, from Sunday, 18 August 1996 to 20 August 1996, with a first long article and one or two shorter articles appearing each day. It was also posted on The Mercury News website with additional information, including documents cited in the series and audio recordings of people quoted in the articles. The website artwork showed the silhouette of a man smoking a crack pipe superimposed over the CIA seal. This artwork proved controversial, and The Mercury News later removed it.

The lede of the first article set out the series' basic claims: "For the better part of a decade, a San Francisco Bay Area drug ring sold tons of cocaine to the Crips and Bloods street gangs of Los Angeles and funneled millions in drug profits to a Latin American guerrilla army run by the U.S. Central Intelligence Agency." This drug ring "opened the first pipeline between Colombia's cocaine cartels and the black neighborhoods of Los Angeles" and, as a result, "The cocaine that flooded in helped spark a crack explosion in urban America."

To show this, the series focused on three men: Freeway Ricky Ross, Oscar Danilo Blandón, and Norwin Meneses. Ross was a major drug dealer in Los Angeles. Blandón and Meneses were Nicaraguans who smuggled drugs into the U.S. and supplied dealers like Ross. After introducing the three, the first article discussed primarily Blandón and Meneses, and their relationship with the Contras and the CIA. Much of the article highlighted the failure of law enforcement agencies to successfully prosecute them and stated that this was largely due to their Contra and CIA connections.

The second article described Blandón's background and how he began smuggling cocaine to support the Contras. Meneses, an established smuggler and a Contra supporter as well, taught Blandón how to smuggle and provided him with cocaine. When Ross discovered the market for crack in Los Angeles, he began buying cocaine from Blandón. Blandón and Meneses' high-volume supply of low-priced high-purity cocaine "allowed Ross to sew up the Los Angeles market and move on. In city after city, local dealers either bought from Ross or got left behind."

The third article discussed the social effects of the crack trade, noting that it had a disparate effect on African-Americans. Asking why crack became so prevalent in the Black community of Los Angeles, the article credited Blandón, referring to him as "the Johnny Appleseed of crack in California." It also found disparities in the treatment of Black and White traffickers in the justice system, contrasting the treatment of Blandón and Ross after their arrests for drug trafficking. Because Blandón cooperated with the Drug Enforcement Administration (DEA), he spent only 28 months in prison, became a paid government informant, and received permanent resident status. Ross was also released early after cooperating in an investigation of police corruption, but was rearrested a few months later in a sting operation arranged with Blandón's help. The article suggested this was in retribution for Ross' testimony in the corruption case.

=== Response to the series ===
After the publication of "Dark Alliance," The Mercury News continued to pursue the story, publishing follow-ups to the original series for the next three months. Other papers were slow to pick up the story, but African Americans quickly took note, especially in South Central Los Angeles where the dealers discussed in the series had been active. They were outraged by the series's charges.

California senators Barbara Boxer and Dianne Feinstein also took note and wrote to CIA director John Deutch and U.S. Attorney General Janet Reno, asking for investigations into the articles' allegations. Maxine Waters, the representative for California's 35th district, which includes South Central Los Angeles, was also outraged by the articles and became one of Webb's strongest supporters. Waters urged the CIA, the U.S. Department of Justice, and the House Permanent Select Committee on Intelligence to investigate.

By the end of September, three federal investigations had been announced: an investigation into the CIA allegations conducted by CIA Inspector-General Frederick Hitz, an investigation into the law enforcement allegations by Justice Department Inspector-General Michael Bromwich, and a second investigation into the CIA by the House Intelligence Committee.

Webb's continuing reporting also triggered a fourth investigation. The first article in "Dark Alliance" that discussed the failure of law enforcement agencies to prosecute Blandón and Meneses had mentioned several cases. One of these was a 1986 raid on Blandón's drug organization by the Los Angeles County Sheriff's Department, which the article suggested had produced evidence of CIA ties to drug smuggling that was later suppressed. When Webb wrote another story on the raid evidence in early October, it received wide attention in Los Angeles. The Los Angeles Sheriff's Department began its own investigation into the "Dark Alliance" claims.

=== Coverage in other papers ===
After the announcement of federal investigations into the claims made in the series, other newspapers began investigating, and several papers published articles suggesting the series' claims were overstated.

The first detailed article on the series's claims appeared in The Washington Post in early October. In their front-page article, reporters Roberto Suro and Walter Pincus wrote that "available information" did not support the series' claims and that "the rise of crack" was "a broad-based phenomenon" driven in numerous places by diverse players. The article discussed Webb's contacts with Ross's attorney and prosecution complaints of how Ross's defense had used Webb's series.

The New York Times published two articles on the series in mid-October, both written by reporter Tim Golden. One article, dealing mostly with the response of the Los Angeles Black community to the stories, described the series' evidence as "thin". Golden also referred to the controversy over Webb's contacts with Ross's lawyer. The other article, citing interviews with current and former intelligence and law-enforcement officials, questioned the importance of the drug dealers discussed in the series, both in the crack cocaine trade and in supporting the Nicaraguan Contras' fight against the Sandinista government in Nicaragua.

The Los Angeles Times devoted the most space to the story, publishing a three-part series called "The Cocaine Trail." The series ran from October 20–22, 1996, and was researched by a team of 17 reporters. The three articles in the series were written by four reporters: Jesse Katz, Doyle McManus, John Mitchell and Sam Fulwood. The first article, by Katz, developed a different picture of the origins of the crack trade than "Dark Alliance" had described, with more gangs and smugglers participating. The second article, by McManus, was the longest of the series and dealt with the role of the Contras in the drug trade and CIA knowledge of drug activities by the Contras. McManus wrote that Blandón's and Meneses's contributions to Contra organizations were significantly less than the "millions" claimed in the series, and stated there was no evidence that the CIA had tried to protect them. The third article, by Mitchell and Fulwood, covered the effects of crack on African-Americans and how it affected their reaction to some of the rumors that arose after the "Dark Alliance" series.

In 2013, Jesse Katz, a former Los Angeles Times reporter, said of the newspaper's coverage "As an L.A. Times reporter, we saw this series in the San Jose Mercury News and kind of wonder[ed] how legit it was and kind of put it under a microscope, and we did it in a way that most of us who were involved in it, I think, would look back on that and say it was overkill. We had this huge team of people at the L.A. Times and kind of piled on to one lone muckraker up in Northern California." And "we really didn't do anything to advance his work or illuminate much to the story, and it was a really kind of tawdry exercise. ... And it ruined that reporter's career."

=== The Mercury News's response ===
Surprised by The Washington Post article, The Mercury News's executive editor Jerome Ceppos wrote to the Post defending the series. The Post refused to print his letter. Ceppos also asked reporter Pete Carey to write a critique of the series for publication in The Mercury News, and had the controversial website artwork changed. Carey's critique appeared in mid-October and went through several of the Post's criticisms of the series, including the importance of Blandón's drug ring in spreading crack, questions about Blandón's testimony in court, and how specific series allegations about CIA involvement had been, giving Webb's responses.

When the Los Angeles Times series appeared, Ceppos again wrote to defend the original series. He also defended the series in interviews with all three papers. The extent of the criticism, however, convinced Ceppos that The Mercury News had to acknowledge to its readers that the series had been subjected to strong criticism. He did this in a column that appeared on November 3, defending the series, but also committing the paper to a review of major criticisms.

Ceppos' column drew editorial responses from both The New York Times and The Washington Post. An editorial in the Times, while criticizing the series for making "unsubstantiated charges", conceded that it did find "drug-smuggling and dealing by Nicaraguans with at least tentative connections to the Contras" and called for further investigation.

The Post's response came from the paper's ombudsman, Geneva Overholser. Overholser was harshly critical of the series, "reported by a seemingly hotheaded fellow willing to have people leap to conclusions his reporting couldn't back up." But while calling the flaws in the series "unforgivably careless journalism," Overholser also criticized the Post's refusal to print Ceppos' letter defending the series and sharply criticized the Post's coverage of the story. Calling the Post's overall focus "misplaced", Overholser expressed regret that the paper had not taken the opportunity to re-examine whether the CIA had overlooked Contra involvement in drug smuggling, "a subject The Post and the public had given short shrift."

In contrast, the series received support from Steve Weinberg, a former executive director of Investigative Reporters and Editors. In a long review of the series' claims in The Baltimore Sun, Weinberg said "I think the critics have been far too harsh. Despite some hyped phrasing, "Dark Alliance" appears to be praiseworthy investigative reporting."

After the series's publication, the Northern California branch of the national Society of Professional Journalists voted Webb "Journalist of the Year" for 1996. Despite the controversy that soon overtook the series, and the request of one board member to reconsider, the branch's board went ahead with the award in November.

=== End of the series ===
After Ceppos' column, The Mercury News spent the next several months conducting an internal review of the story. The review was conducted primarily by editor Jonathan Krim and reporter Pete Carey, who had written the paper's first published analysis of the series. Carey ultimately decided that there were problems with several parts of the story and wrote a draft article incorporating his findings.

The paper also gave Webb permission to visit Central America again to get more evidence supporting the story. By January, Webb filed drafts of four more articles based on his trip, but his editors concluded that the new articles would not help shore up the original series's claims.

The editors met with Webb several times in February to discuss the results of the paper's internal review and eventually decided to print neither Carey's draft article nor the articles Webb had filed. Webb was allowed to keep working on the story and made one more trip to Nicaragua in March. At the end of March, Ceppos told Webb that he was going to present the internal review findings in a column. After discussions with Webb, the column was published on May 11, 1997.

In the column, Ceppos defended parts of the article, writing that the series had "solidly documented" that the drug ring described in the series did have connections with the Contras and did sell large quantities of cocaine in inner-city Los Angeles.

But, Ceppos wrote, the series "did not meet our standards" in four areas. 1) It presented only one interpretation of conflicting evidence and in one case "did not include information that contradicted a central assertion of the series." 2) The series's estimate of the money involved was presented as fact instead of as an estimate. 3) The series oversimplified how the crack epidemic grew. 4) The series "created impressions that were open to misinterpretation" through "imprecise language and graphics."

Ceppos noted that Webb did not agree with these conclusions. He concluded, "How did these shortcomings occur? ... I believe that we fell short at every step of our process: in the writing, editing and production of our work. Several people here share that burden ... But ultimately, the responsibility was, and is, mine."

== Resignation ==
Webb disagreed with Ceppos's column and, in interviews, was critical of the paper's handling of the story. Editors at the paper, on the other hand, felt that Webb had failed to tell them about information that contradicted the series's claims and that he "responded to concerns not with reasoned argument, but with accusations of us selling him out." In June 1997, The Mercury News told Webb it was transferring him from the paper's Sacramento bureau and offered him a choice between working at the main offices in San Jose under closer editorial supervision, or spot reporting in Cupertino; both locations were long commutes from his home in Sacramento. Webb eventually chose Cupertino, but was unhappy with the routine stories he was reporting there and the long commute.

He resigned from the paper in November 1997.

== Federal investigation results ==
The reports of the three federal investigations into the claims of "Dark Alliance" were not released until over a year after the series' publication. The reports rejected the series' main claims but were critical of some CIA and law enforcement actions.

=== Justice Department report ===
The Department of Justice Inspector-General's report was released on July 23, 1998. According to the report's "Epilogue," the report was completed in December 1997 but was not released because the DEA was still attempting to use Danilo Blandón in an investigation of international drug dealers and was concerned that the report would affect the viability of the investigation. When Attorney General Janet Reno determined that a delay was no longer necessary, the report was released unaltered.

The report covered actions by Department of Justice employees in the Federal Bureau of Investigation, the DEA, the Immigration and Naturalization Service, and U.S. Attorneys' Offices. It found that "the allegations contained in the original Mercury News articles were exaggerations of the actual facts." After examining the investigations and prosecutions of the main figures in the series, Blandón, Meneses and Ross, it concluded that "Although the investigations suffered from various problems of communication and coordination, their successes and failures were determined by the normal dynamics that affect the success of scores of investigations of high-level drug traffickers … These factors, rather than anything as spectacular as a systematic effort by the CIA or any other intelligence agency to protect the drug trafficking activities of Contra supporters, determined what occurred in the cases we examined."

It also concluded that "the claims that Blandón and Meneses were responsible for introducing crack cocaine into South Central Los Angeles and spreading the crack epidemic throughout the country were unsupported." Although it did find that both men were major drug dealers, "guilty of enriching themselves at the expense of countless drug users," and that they had contributed money to the Contra cause, "we did not find that their activities were responsible for the crack cocaine epidemic in South Central Los Angeles, much less the rise of crack throughout the nation, or that they were a significant source of support for the Contras."

The report called several of its findings "troubling." It found that Blandón received permanent resident status "in a wholly improper manner" and that for some time the Department "was not certain whether to prosecute Meneses, or use him as a cooperating witness." Regarding issues raised in the series's shorter sidebar stories, it found that some in the government were "not eager" to have DEA agent Celerino Castillo "openly probe" activities at Ilopango Airport in El Salvador, where covert operations in support of the Contras were undertaken, and that the CIA had indeed intervened in a case involving smuggler Julio Zavala. It concluded, however, that these problems were "a far cry from the type of broad manipulation and corruption of the federal criminal justice system suggested by the original allegations."

=== CIA report ===
The CIA Inspector-General's report was issued in two volumes. The first one, "The California Story," was issued in a classified version on December 17, 1997, and in an unclassified version on January 29, 1998. The second volume, "The Contra Story," was issued in a classified version on April 27, 1998, and in an unclassified version on October 8, 1998.

According to the report, the Inspector-General's office (OIG) examined all information the agency had "relating to CIA knowledge of drug trafficking allegations in regard to any person directly or indirectly involved in Contra activities." It also examined "how CIA handled and responded to information regarding allegations of drug trafficking" by people involved in Contra activities or support.

The first volume of the report found no evidence that "any past or present employee of CIA, or anyone acting on behalf of CIA, had any direct or indirect dealing" with Ross, Blandón, or Meneses or that any of the other figures mentioned in "Dark Alliance" were ever employed by or associated with or contacted by the agency.

It found nothing to support the claim that "the drug trafficking activities of Blandón and Meneses were motivated by any commitment to support the Contra cause or Contra activities undertaken by CIA." It noted that Blandón and Meneses claimed to have donated money to Contra sympathizers in Los Angeles, but found no information to confirm that it was true or that the agency had heard of it.

It found no information to support the claim that the agency interfered with law enforcement actions against Ross, Blandón or Meneses.

=== House committee report ===
The House Intelligence Committee issued its report in February 2000. According to the report, it used Webb's reporting and writing as "key resources in focusing and refining the investigation." Like the CIA and Justice Department reports, it also found that neither Blandón, Meneses, nor Ross were associated with the CIA.

Examining the support that Meneses and Blandón gave to the local Contra organization in San Francisco, the report concluded that it was "not sufficient to finance the organization" and did not consist of "millions," contrary to the claims of the "Dark Alliance" series. This support "was not directed by anyone within the Contra movement who had an association with the CIA," and the Committee found "no evidence that the CIA or the Intelligence Community was aware of these individuals’ support." It also found no evidence to support Webb's suggestion that several other drug smugglers mentioned in the series were associated with the CIA, or that anyone associated with the CIA or other intelligence agencies was involved in supplying or selling drugs in Los Angeles.

== Dark Alliance book ==
After his resignation from The Mercury News, Webb expanded the "Dark Alliance" series into a book that responded to the criticism of the series and described his experiences writing the story and dealing with the controversy. It was published in 1998 as Dark Alliance: The CIA, the Contras, and the Crack Cocaine Explosion. A revised version was published in 1999 that incorporated Webb's response to the CIA and Justice Department reports. The February 2000 report by the House Intelligence Committee in turn considered the book's claims as well as the series' claims.

Dark Alliance was a 1998 Pen/Newman's Own First Amendment Award Finalist, 1998 San Francisco Chronicle bestseller, 1999 Bay Area Book Reviewers Award Finalist, and 1999 Firecracker Alternative Book Award-winner in the Politics category.

== Webb's later views ==
In interviews after leaving The Mercury News, Webb described the 1997 controversy as media manipulation. "The government side of the story is coming through the Los Angeles Times, The New York Times, The Washington Post", he stated. "They use the giant corporate press rather than saying anything directly. If you work through friendly reporters on major newspapers, it comes off as The New York Times saying it and not a mouthpiece of the CIA." Webb's longest response to the controversy was in "The Mighty Wurlitzer Plays On," a chapter he contributed to an anthology of press criticism:

If we had met five years ago, you wouldn't have found a more staunch defender of the newspaper industry than me ... And then I wrote some stories that made me realize how sadly misplaced my bliss had been. The reason I'd enjoyed such smooth sailing for so long hadn't been, as I'd assumed, because I was careful and diligent and good at my job ... The truth was that, in all those years, I hadn't written anything important enough to suppress.

Within "The Mighty Wurlitzer Plays On" essay Webb stated he believed there was an active "collusion between the press and the powerful" to report freely on inconsequential matters, "but when it comes to the real down and dirty stuff... We begin to see the limits of our freedoms". He also stated "the series presented dangerous ideas" by suggesting "crimes of state had been committed" (i.e. that the "federal government bore some responsibility, however indirect, for the flood of crack that coursed through black neighborhoods in the 1980s").

Webb wrote later that he "never believed, and never wrote, that there was a grand CIA conspiracy behind the crack plague [...] The CIA couldn’t even mine a harbor without getting its trench coat stuck in its fly."

== Later career ==
After leaving The Mercury News, Webb worked as an investigator for the California State Legislature. His assignments included investigating racial profiling by the California Highway Patrol and charges that the Oracle Corporation had received a no-bid contract award of $95 million in 2001. While working at the legislature, Webb continued to do freelance investigative reporting, sometimes based on his investigative work. For instance, he wrote an article regarding racial profiling in traffic stops which appeared in the April 1999 edition of Esquire magazine.

Webb later moved to the State Assembly's Office of Majority Services. He was laid off in February 2004 when Assembly Member Fabian Núñez was elected Speaker.

In August 2004, Webb joined the Sacramento News & Review, an alternative weekly newspaper, where he continued doing investigative writing. One of his last articles examined America's Army, a video game designed by the U.S. Army.

== Death ==
Webb was found dead in his Carmichael home on December 10, 2004, with two gunshot wounds to the head. His death was ruled a suicide by the Sacramento County coroner's office. According to a description of Webb's injuries in the Los Angeles Times, he shot himself with a .38 revolver, which he placed near his right ear. The first shot went through his face, and exited at his left cheek. The coroner's staff concluded that the second shot hit an artery.

After a local newspaper reported that Webb had died from multiple gunshots, the coroner's office received so many calls asking about Webb's death that Sacramento County Coroner Robert Lyons issued a statement confirming Webb had died by suicide. When asked by local reporters about the possibility of two gunshots being a suicide, Lyons replied: "It's unusual in a suicide case to have two shots, but it has been done in the past, and it is in fact a distinct possibility." However, there were still a number of Internet rumors at the time claiming that Webb had been killed as retribution for his "Dark Alliance" series, published eight years before.

Webb's ex-wife, Susan Bell, told reporters that she believed Webb had died by suicide. "The way he was acting it would be hard for me to believe it was anything but suicide," she said. According to Bell, Webb had been unhappy for some time over his inability to get a job at another major newspaper. He had sold his house the week before his death because he was unable to afford the mortgage.

After Webb's death, a collection of his stories from before and after the "Dark Alliance" series was published. The collection, The Killing Game: Selected Stories from the Author of Dark Alliance, was edited by Webb's son, Eric.

== Legacy ==
=== Views on Webb's journalism ===
Views on Webb's journalism have been polarized. During and immediately after the controversy over "Dark Alliance," Webb's earlier writing was examined closely. A January 1997 article in American Journalism Review noted that a 1994 series Webb wrote had also been the subject of a Mercury News internal review that criticized Webb's reporting. A New York Times profile of Webb in June 1997 noted that two of his series written for the Cleveland Plain Dealer had resulted in lawsuits that the paper had settled.

On the other hand, many of the writers and editors who worked with him have had high praise for him. Walter Bogdanich, a Pulitzer Prize-winning reporter who worked with Webb on The Plain Dealer, told American Journalism Review editor Susan Paterno "He was brilliant; he knew more about public records than anybody I've ever known." Mary Anne Sharkey, Webb's editor at The Plain Dealer, told writer Alicia Shepard in 1997 that Webb was known as 'the carpenter' "because he had everything nailed down. Gary's documentation is awesome and his work ethic is unbelievable." California Representative Maxine Waters, who was Webb's strongest supporter in Congress after the "Dark Alliance" controversy broke, issued a statement after Webb's death calling him "one of the finest investigative journalists that our country has ever seen."

Jonathan Krim, The Mercury News editor who recruited Webb from The Plain Dealer and who supervised The Mercury News internal review of "Dark Alliance," told AJR editor Paterno that Webb "had all the qualities you'd want in a reporter: curious, dogged, a very high sense of wanting to expose wrongdoing and to hold private and public officials accountable." But as Krim told Webb's biographer Nick Schou, "The zeal that helped make Gary a relentless reporter was coupled with an inability to question himself, to entertain the notion that he might have erred." Scott Herhold, Webb's first editor at The Mercury-News, wrote in a 2013 column that "Gary Webb was a journalist of outsized talent. Few reporters I've known could match his nose for an investigative story. When he was engaged, he worked hard. He wrote well. But Webb had one huge blind side: He was fundamentally a man of passion, not of fairness. When facts didn't fit his theory, he tended to shove them to the sidelines."

=== Views on "Dark Alliance" series ===
The claim in the "Dark Alliance" series that the drug ring of Meneses-Blandón-Ross sparked the "crack explosion" has been criticized. Nick Schou, a journalist who wrote a 2006 biography of Webb, has claimed that this was the most important error in the series. Writing on the Los Angeles Times opinion page, Schou said, "Webb asserted, improbably, that the Blandón-Meneses-Ross drug ring opened 'the first pipeline between Colombia's cocaine cartels and the black neighborhoods of Los Angeles,' helping to 'spark a crack explosion in urban America.' The story offered no evidence to support such sweeping conclusions, a fatal error that would ultimately destroy Webb, if not his editors."

While finding this part of the series unsupported, Schou said that some of the series's claims on CIA involvement are supported, writing that "The CIA conducted an internal investigation that acknowledged in March 1998 that the agency had covered up Contra drug trafficking for more than a decade." According to Schou, the investigation "confirmed key chunks of Webb's allegations." In a 2013 article in the LA Weekly, Schou wrote that Webb was "vindicated by a 1998 CIA Inspector General report, which revealed that for more than a decade the agency had covered up a business relationship it had with Nicaraguan drug dealers like Blandón."

Writing after Webb's death in 2005, The Nation magazine's former Washington Editor David Corn said that Webb "was on to something but botched part of how he handled it." According to Corn, Webb "was wrong on some important details, but he was, in a way, closer to the truth than many of his establishment media critics who neglected the story of the real CIA-contra-cocaine connection." Like Schou, Corn cites the inspector general's report, which he says "acknowledged that the CIA had indeed worked with suspected drugrunners (sic) while supporting the contras."

Not all writers agree that the inspector general's report supported the series's claims. Jeff Leen, assistant managing editor for investigative reporting at The Washington Post, wrote in a 2014 opinion page article that "the report found no CIA relationship with the drug ring Webb had written about." Leen, who covered the cocaine trade for the Miami Herald in the 1980s, rejects the claim that "because [the report] uncovered an agency mindset of indifference to drug-smuggling allegations", it vindicated Webb's reporting.

Peter Kornbluh, a researcher at George Washington University's National Security Archives, also does not agree that the report vindicated the series. Noting that most of the activities discussed in the report had nothing to do with the people Webb reported on, Kornbluh told Schou, "I can't say it's a vindication. It was good that his story forced those reports to come out, but part of what made that happen was based on misleading information."

=== Films ===
Kill the Messenger (2014) is based on Webb's book Dark Alliance and Nick Schou's biography of Webb. Actor Jeremy Renner portrays Webb.

=== TV ===
Snowfall is an American crime drama television series set in Los Angeles in 1983. The series revolves around the first crack epidemic and its impact on the culture of the city. The series follows the stories of several characters whose lives are fated to intersect, including CIA operative Teddy McDonald who helps to secure guns for the Contras. The show has been described as a fictionalized version of Dark Alliance.

== See also ==
- CIA drug trafficking allegations
- CIA involvement in Contra cocaine trafficking
- Danny Casolaro
- Iran–Contra affair
- John Barnett
- Multiple gunshot suicide

== Sources ==
- Schou, Nick (2006). Kill the Messenger: How the CIA's Crack Cocaine Controversy Destroyed Gary Webb. Nation Books. ISBN 1-56025-930-2.
- Webb, Gary (2002). "The Mighty Wurlitzer Plays On". In Borjesson, Kristina (ed.). Into the Buzzsaw: Leading Journalists Expose the Myth of a Free Press. Prometheus Books. pp. 141–157. ISBN 1-57392-972-7.
- Webb, Gary (1998). Dark Alliance: The CIA, the Contras, and the Crack Cocaine Explosion. Seven Stories Press. ISBN 1-888363-93-2.
- Webb, Gary (January 4, 2011). Webb, Eric (ed.). The Killing Game. New York: Seven Stories Press. ISBN 9781609801434.
- "San Jose Mercury News "Dark Alliance" web page". Archived from the original on December 20, 1996.
  Includes follow up stories and links to coverage from other papers (some of these are broken).
- The CIA-Contra-Crack Cocaine Controversy: A Review of the Justice Department's Investigations and Prosecutions Archived 2015-04-21 at the Wayback Machine
  The United States Department of Justice Office of the Inspector General report on the claims made in the Dark Alliance newspaper series, released on July 22, 1998.
- "Report of Investigation Concerning Allegations of Connections Between CIA and The Contras in Cocaine Trafficking to the United States". Central Intelligence Agency Office of the Inspector General.
  The Central Intelligence Agency Office of the Inspector General report on the claims made in the Dark Alliance newspaper series, released in two volumes, volume 1 on January 29, 1998, and volume 2 on October 8, 1998.
- United States House Permanent Select Committee on Intelligence (February 2000). Report On the Central Intelligence Agency's Alleged Involvement in Crack Cocaine Trafficking in the Los Angeles Area.
  House Intelligence Committee report on the claims made in the Dark Alliance series (excerpt).
- United States Senate Select Committee on Intelligence (1997). Hearings on allegations of a CIA connection to crack cocaine epidemic. U.S. Government Printing Office. ISBN 9780160551307.
  Record of Senate Intelligence Committee hearings on Dark Alliance series claims, October 23 and November 26, 1996.
