= Freeway Ricky Ross =

American author and former drug lord (born 1960)

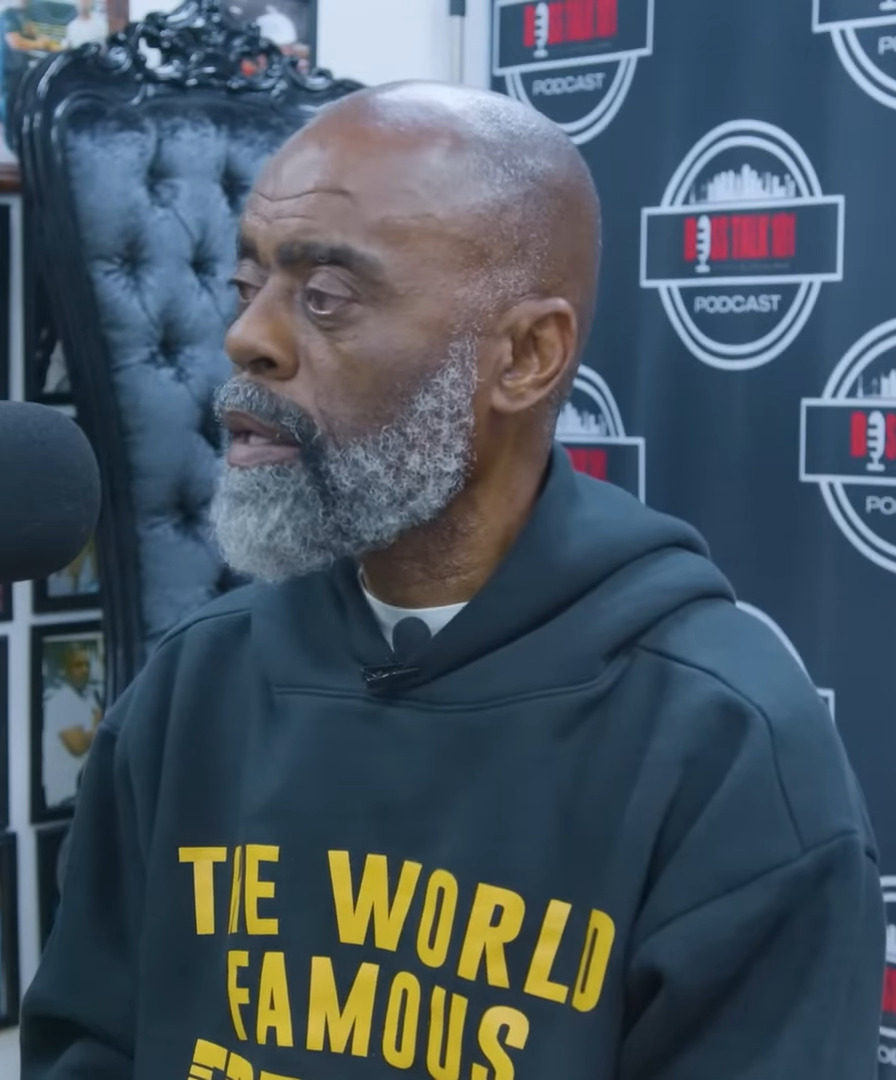
- Ross in 2025
- Born: Ricky Donnell Ross; January 26, 1960 (age 66); Terrell, Texas, U.S.
- Other names: Freeway, Freeway Ricky Ross, Freeway Ricky
- Occupations: Author, former drug trafficker
- Status: Released
- Conviction: Conspiracy to possess 100 kilograms or more of cocaine with intent to distribute (21 U.S.C. §§ 841 and 846)
- Penalty: Life imprisonment; lowered on appeal to 20 years
- Website: freewayrickyross.com

Ricky Donnell "Freeway Ricky" Ross (born January 26, 1960) is an American author and former drug lord best known for the drug empire he established in Los Angeles, California, in the early-to-mid 1980s. He was sentenced to life in prison, though the sentence was shortened on appeal and Ross was released in 2009.

== Biography ==
Ross was born on January 26, 1960, in Terrell, Texas. He attended school at Susan Miller Dorsey High School in Los Angeles. He played for the tennis team but was unable to get the college tennis scholarship he aspired to because he was illiterate.

Ross has said that when he first saw crack cocaine as a teenager in 1979, he did not immediately believe it was a drug because it looked different from other drugs he had seen.

The nickname Freeway came from Ross owning properties along Los Angeles' Interstate 110, also known as the Harbor Freeway. According to an October 2013 Esquire magazine article, "Between 1982 and 1989, federal prosecutors estimated, Ross bought and resold several metric tons of cocaine," with Ross' gross revenue claimed to be more than $900 million (equivalent to $2.7 billion in 2025) and profits of almost $300 million ($1.172 billion in 2025). During the height of his drug dealing, Ross was said to have sold "$3 million in one day." According to the Oakland Tribune, "In the course of his rise, prosecutors estimate that Ross exported several tons of cocaine to New York, Ohio, Pennsylvania and elsewhere, and made more than $500 million between 1983 and 1984."

Several attempts to charge Ross with various crimes between 1978 and 1987 did not lead to conviction. In November 1989, a SWAT team arrested Ross in Los Angeles and he was held on remand on a federal indictment for drug conspiracy. He was then extradited to Cincinnati, Ohio, where a judge ordered him to be held without bail. He was on remand for 280 days before he pleaded guilty to one federal count of drug conspiracy on September 5, 1990. In February 1991, he was sentenced to 121 months in prison, but later that year he testified against LAPD officers in a federal corruption case, and his sentence was reduced to 51 months. He was also allowed to keep $2 million in cash and assets from his drug career. On release from federal prison, Ross was extradited to Texas and served another nine months in a state prison before being released in September 1994.

On March 2, 1995, Ross was arrested again in San Diego, California, for cocaine dealing. On March 19, 1996, he was convicted in a federal court and received a mandatory sentence of life imprisonment under the three-strikes law after being convicted for purchasing more than 100 kilograms of cocaine from a federal agent in a sting operation. Later that year, a series of articles by journalist Gary Webb in the San Jose Mercury News revealed a connection between one of Ross's cocaine sources, Danilo Blandón, and the CIA as part of the Iran–Contra affair. Having learned to read at the age of 28, during his first stint in prison, Ross spent much of his time behind bars studying the law. He eventually discovered a legal loophole that would lead to his release. Ross's case was brought to a federal court of appeals which found that the three-strikes law had been erroneously applied and ordered that he be resentenced. His sentence was reduced to 20 years; he was released from Federal Correctional Institution, Texarkana on September 29, 2009.

Ross was arrested in October 2015 on suspicion of possessing cash related to the sales of illegal drugs when police discovered $100,000 in his possession during a traffic stop. Ross later alleged that he had been racially profiled and stated that he was carrying a large amount of cash for the purchase of a home. Charges were ultimately dropped, and Ross explained he had earned the cash from book sales and speaking fees.

== Cocaine business ==
=== Cocaine introduction ===
Ross began his cocaine empire after his illiteracy prevented him from earning a tennis scholarship for college. He began spending time with an upholstery teacher at a Los Angeles community college who revealed he dealt cocaine and offered Ross a small amount to sell. Ross used his profit to purchase more cocaine to sell, expanding his small operation. Ross eventually began to ask for quantities to sell that exceeded what the teacher was willing to procure, so he turned to find a dealer.

The teacher referred Ross to his supplier, Ivan Arguellas, who offered to keep Ross supplied. Arguellas was able to provide larger quantities at a better price, and Ross quickly went from dealing in grams of cocaine to dealing in ounces. About eight months after becoming Ross's supplier, Arguellas was shot in the spine, resulting in months of hospitalization that forced him out of the cocaine business. His brother-in-law Henry Corrales took over the business, but was not enthusiastic about the trade and had failed to make any connections of his own to suppliers.

A Nicaraguan exile and cocaine distributor named Danilo Blandón was acquainted with Arguellas and Corrales, and although he did not know him personally, was impressed with the amount of cocaine that Ross was moving. Blandón offered to supply cocaine to Corrales to sell to Ross, for a fifty-fifty split of the profit. Eventually, Corrales lost his appetite for the cocaine business and retired, at which point Ross became a direct customer of Blandón.

Through his connection to Blandón, and Blandón's supplier Norwin Meneses Cantarero, Ross was able to purchase Nicaraguan cocaine at significantly reduced rates. Ross began selling cocaine at $10,000 per kilo, a price well below average, while also distributing it to the Bloods and Crips street gangs. By 1982, Ross had received his moniker of "Freeway Ricky" and claimed to have sold up to US$3 million worth of cocaine per day, purchasing 1,000 pounds (454 kilos) of cocaine a week.

Ross initially invested most of his profits in houses and businesses, because he feared his mother would catch on to what he was doing if he started spending lavishly on himself. In a jailhouse interview with reporter Gary Webb, Ross said, "We were hiding our money from our mothers." He invested a portion of the proceeds from his drug dealing activities in Anita Baker's first album.

=== Drug empire ===
With thousands of employees, Ross has said he operated drug sales not only in Los Angeles but in places across the country including St. Louis, New Orleans, Texas, Kansas City, Oklahoma, Indiana, Cincinnati, North Carolina, South Carolina, Baltimore, Cleveland, and Seattle. He has said that his most lucrative sales came from the Ohio area. He made similar claims in a 1996 PBS interview.

Federal prosecutors estimated that between 1982 and 1989 Ross bought and resold several metric tons of cocaine. In 1980, his gross earnings were said to be in excess of $900 million – with a profit of nearly $300 million. As his distribution empire grew to include forty-two cities, the price he paid per kilo of powder cocaine dropped from as much as $60,000 to as low as $10,000."

Much of Ross's success at evading law enforcement was due to his ring's possession of police scanners and voice scramblers. Furthermore, journalist Gary Webb alleged that the CIA was sponsoring the operation as part of its effort to finance Contras, giving Ross another level of protection, although this claim has since been disputed. Following one drug bust, a Los Angeles County sheriff remarked that Ross's men had "better equipment than we have."

== Lawsuit against rapper Rick Ross ==
On June 18, 2010, Ross sued rapper Rick Ross (real name William Leonard Roberts II) for using his name, filing a copyright infringement lawsuit against Ross in Los Angeles County Superior Court. Jay-Z had been called to testify in the lawsuit, as he was President of Def Jam when Ross was signed to the label. Ross sought $10 million in compensation in the lawsuit.

After the lawsuit was dismissed on July 3, 2010, the album Teflon Don was released as scheduled on July 20, 2010. A federal judge dismissed his case, ruling that it should be refiled in California state court because it fell under California state law. Ross refiled the case with the State of California in 2011, while appealing his federal case. A federal appeals upheld the dismissal in 2012.

Ross refiled in Los Angeles Superior Court with publicity rights claims. Trial was set for early May 2012. The case was dismissed by a judge in the Los Angeles Superior Court.

The California State case was updated with a motion in Freeway Ricky Ross's favor as to Warner Bros. Records and their use of the name and image Rick Ross in July 2012.

A trial was set for August 27, 2013 in Freeway Rick Ross versus Rick Ross and Warner Music Group. The California trial court ruled in favor of the rapper Rick Ross, allowing him to keep the name. In December 2013, a state appeals court upheld the ruling on First Amendment grounds.

== Other ventures ==
In January 2022, it was reported that Ross had established a boxing management company, Team Freeway Boxing, with four professional boxers under contract. Ross will also be acting in an advisory role for light welterweight contender Anthony Peterson.

In an interview on The Joe Rogan Experience, in June 2024, Ross stated he owns a marijuana dispensary.

== Book ==
Journalist and author Cathy Scott co-wrote Ross's autobiography with him. The memoir, Freeway Rick Ross: The Untold Autobiography, was released at a book launch at the Eso Won Bookstore in Los Angeles on June 17, 2014 to a standing-room only crowd.

KCET TV in its review wrote, "(The book) is fascinating for its unsentimental, inside look at his career on the streets of South Central, which started for Ross with car theft and quickly shifted to drugs and the big time".

The memoir was nominated for ForeWord Review's IndiFab Best Book of the Year Award 2014 in the true crime category. In June 2015, winners were announced, with the book named as a Foreword Reviews' 2014 INDIEFAB Book of the Year Award Finalist, True Crime.

== In popular culture ==
Ross was a key figure in filmmaker Kevin Booth's documentary American Drug War: The Last White Hope. The second episode of the first season of BET's American Gangster documentary series was focused on the story of Ricky Ross and his connection to the Iran–Contra scandal.

Ross was a guest interview on VH1's Planet Rock History of Crack and Hip Hop Documentary.

Ross is featured in the 2015 two-part documentary Freeway: Crack in the System, which details various levels of the drug trade, the Iran–Contra affair, and mass incarceration. In 2016, the documentary was nominated for an Emmy for Outstanding Investigative Journalism: Long Form.

In the 2014 film Kill the Messenger, Ross is portrayed by Michael K. Williams.

Ross claims his lifestyle and cocaine business, as well as his suspected involvement in the Iran-Contra Affair, heavily influenced the fictional character Franklin Saint, the protagonist of the FX crime drama television series Snowfall. Ross says he and the show's creator, John Singleton, "partnered up to make a movie", but that Singleton "disappeared" before going on to make Snowfall. Singleton died in 2019 and never confirmed Ross' claims.

The Coup, in their single My Favorite Mutiny talk about CIA involvement in the rise of Ricky Ross.
