= Heneghan =

Heneghan is a surname of Irish origin. Notable people with the surname include:

- Barry Heneghan, Irish politician
- Ben Heneghan (born 1993), English professional footballer
- Carl Heneghan (born 1968), British physician and epidemiologist
- Elizabeth Heneghan, Canadian judge
- Jack Heneghan (born 1996), American football player
- James Heneghan (1930–2021), British-Canadian author
- John Heneghan (1881–1945), Irish priest, editor and missionary
- Judith Heneghan (born 1965), British writer and university lecturer
- Margaret Heneghan (born 1959), Irish judge
- Martin Heneghan (born 1991), Irish darts player
- Róisín Heneghan (born 1963), Irish architect and designer
- Tomás Heneghan, Irish activist

== See also ==
- Hennigan, surname
