= No Refunds =

No Refunds and similar can mean:

- No Refunds (film), Doug Stanhope's third stand-up DVD
- See Returning (in the sense of a customer taking previously purchased merchandise back to the retailer)

== See also ==
- Refund (disambiguation)
