= Hennigan =

Hennigan is a surname of Irish origin, with the name being most common in Mayo and Sligo counties. Notable people with the surname include:

- Adrian Hennigan, British film critic
- Brian Hennigan, British novelist, producer and director
- Charlie Hennigan (1935–2017), American football player
- Gavan Hennigan (born 1981), Irish extreme environment athlete
- Gilbert Franklin Hennigan (1883–1960), American politician from Louisiana
- James W. Hennigan Jr. (1927–2020), American lawyer and politician from Massachusetts
- James W. Hennigan Sr. (1890–1969), American businessman and politician from Massachusetts
- John Hennigan (politician), Irish politician and farmer
- John Hennigan (poker player) (born 1970), American professional poker player from Philadelphia, Pennsylvania
- John Morrison (wrestler), (born John Hennigan, 1979), American former professional wrestler
- Maura Hennigan (born 1952), the Clerk Magistrate of the Suffolk County, Massachusetts Superior Court Criminal/Business Division
- Mike Hennigan (footballer) (born 1942), English former professional football player and manager
- Mike Hennigan (American football) (born 1951), American football player and coach
- Phil Hennigan (1946–2016), right-handed former Major League Baseball pitcher
- Rob Hennigan (born 1982), American basketball executive and former general manager of the Orlando Magic

== In popular culture ==
- Hennigan's Scotch, a fictional brand of Scotch whisky introduced in the Seinfeld episode "The Red Dot"

== See also ==
- Morgan v. Hennigan, the case that defined the school busing controversy in Boston, Massachusetts during the 1970s
