= Patrick Mooney =

Patrick Mooney may refer to:

- Patrick Mooney (Australian politician) (1880–1942), Australian Lang Labor politician from New South Wales
- Patrick Mooney (Irish politician) (1903–1989), Irish Fianna Fáil politician represented Monaghan from 1957–69
- Pat Roy Mooney (born 1947), Canadian environmentalist
