= Morbid Obscenity =

2006 comedy studio album

Studio album by Doug Stanhope Sean Rouse Andy Andrist Lynn Shawcroft Arthur Hinty as The Unbookables
- Released: 2006
- Genre: Comedy
- Length: 79:13
- Label: Stand Up! Records

Morbid Obscenity is the first CD put out by the collection of Comedians known as The Unbookables. Released in 2006 by Stand Up! Records and recorded live at the Skyline Comedy Cafe in Appleton, WI on April 5–8, 2006, Morbid Obscenity features music by "Banjo Ghost" Randy McCleary and stand-up sets by Doug Stanhope, Sean Rouse, Andy Andrist, Lynn Shawcroft, and Arthur Hinty.

Organized by Doug Stanhope, the CD was created as a benefit seeking to raise $25,000 for Arthur Hinty to receive Roux en Y gastric bypass surgery, which his insurance would not cover even though his diabetes was greatly affected by being morbidly obese.

== Performances ==
Serving as both MC and headliner, Stanhope makes his sixth appearance on a stand-up CD with Morbid Obscenity. The CD also serves as the second appearance for Andy Andrist (following his debut CD Dumb It Down for the Masses), and debuts Lynn Shawcroft and veteran Sean Rouse.

Morbid Obscenity also marks Stanhope's second collaboration with "Banjo Ghost" Randy McCleary, the first being Stanhope's DVD Deadbeat Hero.

Arthur Hinty also performs on the CD. Having done stand-up only a handful of times, Hinty performed a short set consisting of a mixture of original material and some jokes that had been "donated" to him by comedians Andy Andrist, Norman Wilkerson, Larry Hyde, and Jack&Dino.

== Track listing ==
1. "Banjo Randy"
2. "Doug Stanhope Intro"
3. "Andy Andrist 1"
4. "Andy Andrist 2"
5. "Andy Andrist 3"
6. "Doug and the Condo Rules"
7. "Lynn Shawcroft"
8. "Doug and the Surveillance Nation"
9. "Sean Rouse 1"
10. "Sean Rouse 2"
11. "Sean Rouse 3"
12. "Doug Introduces Mr. Hinty"
13. "Arthur Hinty"
14. "Doug Stanhope 1"
15. "Doug Stanhope 2"
16. "Doug Stanhope 3"
17. "Doug Stanhope 4"
18. "Doug Stanhope 5"

== Paying It Forward ==
In the year following the surgery, Hinty provided various incentives and discounts for those who bought the CDs, including one sale that was designed to encourage people to vote for Brendon Walsh in the Famecast finals. Walsh would go on to win the stand-up comedy category.

CDs may still be available through Amazon.
