= Doug Stanhope =

American comedian (born 1967)

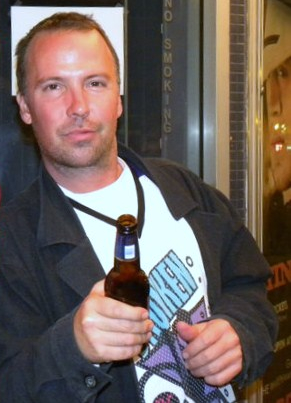
- Stanhope in 2010
- Born: March 25, 1967 (age 59); Worcester, Massachusetts, U.S.
- Partner(s): Amy Bingaman (2005–present)

Comedy career
- Years active: 1990–present
- Medium: Stand-up; television; books; podcast
- Genres: Black comedy; blue comedy; political satire; insult comedy; character comedy
- Subjects: American culture; American politics; current events; recreational drug use; human sexuality; religion; family
- Website: www.dougstanhope.com

Doug Stanhope (born March 25, 1967) is an American stand-up comedian, author, actor, political activist and podcast host. His stand-up material primarily consists of vulgar, confrontational observations about everyday life.

== Early life ==
Stanhope was born in Worcester, Massachusetts. His mother Bonnie was a waitress and his father Russ was head of the science department at Stanhope's school. Bonnie quit drinking and divorced her husband when Stanhope was ten years old, and moved to Florida. Stanhope and his older brother, Jeff, lived with Russ.

In 1998, he persuaded Bonnie to live near him in West Hollywood, California. Later, she suffered from emphysema. In 2008, at her request, she wished for Stanhope to be involved in an assisted suicide with a mixture of cocktails and prescription morphine. Stanhope waited until the statute of limitations had expired for the ensuing credit card fraud before telling the story in his stand-up act and his second book.

At age 12, Stanhope's school psychiatrist wrote a letter to his mother detailing his concern with Stanhope's tendency to sketch gory images and adult-themed cartoons, suggesting he was "in need of professional help". Stanhope quit school at fifteen. Among his early comedy influences were Monty Python and National Lampoon. Before he started comedy full-time, Stanhope worked in telemarketing, "borderline legal stuff, trying to scam people basically".

Eventually Stanhope left Worcester and lived in Los Angeles for six months. Following this he moved around from Florida, back to Massachusetts, to Oceanside, California, back to Massachusetts again, to Idaho, before settling in Las Vegas. He now lives in Bisbee, Arizona.

== Career ==
=== 1990s ===
Stanhope began his stand-up comedy career in 1990 at age 23, first performing at an open mic night at a Las Vegas bar. He developed his act in Las Vegas before moving to Phoenix, Arizona, where he landed a gig as a house MC at a comedy club.

In 1995, he settled in West Hollywood which he "hated [...] so much" partly due to the slump in comedy acts at the time. Among his regular spots were the Hollywood Improv or The Comedy Store, before he became based in Playa del Rey and worked in clubs outside the city center. Around this time, he landed a development deal and "flirted" with the idea of producing a sitcom by co-writing a pilot episode with a writer of The Mary Tyler Moore Show. He later described the script as a "piece of shit", and felt thankful it was never picked up. In 1995, Stanhope won the San Francisco International Comedy Competition against Dane Cook in a three-week contest.

=== 2000s ===
In the aftermath of the September 11 attacks in New York City, Stanhope received some criticism from audiences over his comments regarding the event. This included protests outside of his gigs and attacks on stage.

In July 2002, Fox aired back-to-back episodes of Stanhope's hidden camera television show Invasion of the Hidden Cameras. The project began in 1999, with Stanhope writing and producing various pranks for it, before the network decided to withdraw its broadcast. Stanhope accused Spy TV of stealing half of his ideas and achieving good ratings as a result. He starred as one of the pranksters on Spy TV.

In August 2002, Stanhope won the Strathmore Press Award for his week-long run at the Edinburgh Festival Fringe, as voted by 40 press critics. The prize was £1,000 and a feature in the British celebrity magazine OK!. Following the run, Stanhope signed with his longtime manager Brian Hennigan.

In 2003 and 2004, Stanhope co-hosted the fifth and sixth seasons of The Man Show with Joe Rogan. He agreed to the project in order to become more financially stable. Among the show's segments included Stanhope lasting five rounds in a boxing match with Tonya Harding in which the 5 ft 7 in (1.70 m) Stanhope lost by decision, and his mother reviewing pornographic films. He hosted his own radio show on SIRIUS Satellite Radio in 2005. That year, Stanhope hosted Girls Gone Wild: America Uncovered.

In 2005, Stanhope moved to Bisbee, Arizona.

He appeared in the film The Aristocrats, telling a caustic joke to a baby.

Stanhope established a group of touring comics known as The Unbookables featuring such artists as Andy Andrist, and Brendon Walsh, among others. The Unbookables' first CD, Morbid Obscenity, was released in 2006.

In June 2006, Stanhope was booked to perform several shows at the Cat Laughs Comedy Festival in Kilkenny, Ireland. However, roughly ten minutes into his set, a joke about Irish men committing pedophilia because of the ugliness of Irish women caused a hostile reaction from the audience. The incident led to the cancellation of Stanhope's remaining appearances at the festival. That August, he returned to the Edinburgh Festival Fringe, agreeing to a full three-week residency. At one show, one of his routines sparked a violent affray with an angered audience member and the police were called in, causing Stanhope to leave the venue. He gained 5-star reviews from the press. On his opening night he took what was believed to be an ecstasy tablet that was handed to him by a member of the audience. At the 2008 Fringe, Stanhope announced A Day with Doug, an opportunity to spend an entire day with him for £7,349, the average amount that comedians lose when they are booked at one of the four biggest venues at the festival.

Stanhope announced his intention to seek election as the United States President in the 2008 election on the Libertarian Party ticket. He added: "It seemed like a funny thing to do [...] But people were either amused or horrified at the idea of me representing their party". His focus was for "individual freedom, self-government and making America fun again".

Stanhope's live show was placed in the top 5 of the 20 Best Live Shows of 2009 by London's The Guardian newspaper.

Stanhope's seventh album, From Across The Street, was released on November 24, 2009.

=== 2010s ===
In 2010, Stanhope recorded a series of vignettes for the British news show Newswipe with Charlie Brooker. In 2013, he did the same during Charlie Brooker's Weekly Wipe as "the voice of America". On November 17, 2010, Stanhope signed to rock and metal label Roadrunner Records to launch their new comedy label, Roadrunner Comedy. On May 3, 2011, the album was released: Oslo: Burning The Bridge To Nowhere. This was supported with an international tour, which included a 25-night residency at the Leicester Square Theatre in London. By this time, Stanhope had won Time Out New York's Best Comedy Performance award twice.

In 2011, in co-operation with the mayor of Reykjavík and comedian Jón Gnarr, Stanhope scheduled a performance in Iceland's only maximum security prison, Litla-Hraun. The show took place on September 25. Also in 2011, Stanhope appeared on the FX series Louie as Eddie Mack, a comedian that Louis C.K. knew 20 years earlier when they first started performing, in the season 2 episode entitled "Eddie", first aired on August 11, 2011. He spoke of his role: "I tried to beg out of it. I said, I suck at acting. He had to talk me into trying", and auditioned online through Skype.

In 2012, Stanhope released his comedy special Before Turning the Gun on Himself, recorded in Salt Lake City. He took the show's name from a phrase that he noted was commonly used on online news articles. Also in 2012, he impersonated John Lydon in a pre-taped radio interview with Mike Ragogna after the studio mistakenly called his number thinking it was Lydon's.

On February 16, 2013, Stanhope debuted The Doug Stanhope Podcast, recorded out of his home in Bisbee, Arizona. In 2014, it was hosted by the All Things Comedy network.

In May 2013, an appeal initiated by Stanhope raised nearly $126,000 for Rebecca Vitsmun and her family whose home was destroyed by the 2013 tornado in Moore, Oklahoma. He said he did so in support of her declared atheism, saying he admired her courage in a predominantly Christian state.

In 2014, Stanhope announced on The Howard Stern Show that he was working with Johnny Depp on a show. According to Stanhope, Depp befriended him in Europe and had an unknown project in mind for him. He had a supporting role in the 2014 Chris Rock film Top Five, playing a police officer.

Stanhope appeared on Bar Rescue as Jon Taffer's guest to watch the recon of the Pomona, California, bar Friar Tucks in an episode called "Storming the Castle".

In May 2015, Stanhope announced that he was writing a book about his life with his mother, an occasional subject in his comedy. The book, entitled Digging Up Mother: A Love Story, was released on May 10, 2016, and includes a foreword by Johnny Depp.

Stanhope filmed his comedy special No Place Like Home on November 21, 2015, at the Bisbee Royale in Bisbee. The film was produced by Johnny Depp.

He appears in comedian Ray Harrington's 2015 documentary Be a Man.

In June 2016, actress Amber Heard sued Stanhope for his "defamatory" claim that she was blackmailing her ex-husband Johnny Depp. Heard dropped the lawsuit in the aftermath of her and Depp's $7 million divorce settlement.

In 2017, Stanhope released his third book, This is Not Fame. It is a collection of stories about being an infamous comedian.

=== 2020s ===
In 2020, Stanhope released his special, The Dying of a Last Breed, which was filmed at the Plaza Hotel and Casino in Las Vegas, Nevada. He also released his fourth book, No Encore for the Donkey.

In 2022, he announced a fall/autumn tour of the US and UK & Ireland.

In 2023, Stanhope produced and starred in The Road Dog with his former partner Khrystyne Haje.

In 2024, Stanhope joined fellow comedians Brendon Walsh and Sean Green to launch the Get to the Points Podcast on Green's Sports Gambling Podcast Network.

In 2026, Stanhope appeared in Grand Theft Auto VI as a in-game radio DJ.

== Political activism ==
Although Stanhope's views have led people to believe that he is a liberal, he does not accept this characterization. Stanhope says that libertarianism was a phase he went through, but described himself as an anarchist in 2017.

In 2004, he endorsed the Free State Project, a proposed political migration of at least 20,000 libertarians to a single low-population state, in order to make the state a stronghold for libertarian ideas. According to Stanhope this is an idea "that could produce tangible change in our lifetime."

In 2012, Stanhope originally supported Republican Ron Paul for the 2012 presidential election, but later endorsed Libertarian Gary Johnson.

In 2013, Stanhope appeared at a Bisbee, Arizona City Council Meeting to express his support for civil unions between gay couples following reports that local churches were planning to bus in local members to filibuster the vote. He stated "I am not gay and I think marriage is stupid. I have no dog in this fight except human equality." The meeting started with a prayer led by a local preacher and Stanhope's speech mentioned this, stating "I thought it was absolutely abhorrent that this would open with a preacher preaching Jesus in a city function. I am shaking with rage..." The measure to allow civil unions eventually passed with a 5–2 vote.

== Personal life ==
In 2002, Stanhope and his girlfriend Renee Morrison staged a fake marriage ceremony in Las Vegas. He later said that it was "mocking the institution of marriage", and that it was not legitimate. At one point, the two were expecting a child but opted for abortion, and Stanhope got a vasectomy. Stanhope dated comedian and former attorney Betsy Wise for 18 months. Around 2005, Stanhope met his current partner Amy "Bingo" Bingaman, who he has referred to as his girlfriend and wife; they reside in Bisbee, Arizona. Stanhope is opposed to having children and cites overpopulation as a reason.

Stanhope is known for his heavy alcohol consumption and is a self-confessed drunk. In a 2011 interview, he said the last time he was sober on stage was in 2003. He is also known for dressing in thrift store clothing.

He describes himself as pro-choice and pro-drug. In an interview with PETA, Stanhope criticized the use of wild animals for entertainment purposes as well as the fur trade. He is an atheist and raised $125,000 for a 2013 Moore tornado victim who declared herself a non-believer on TV.

Stanhope visited Ukraine in 2024. Along with some Ukrainian stand-up comedians he went to the front line. During the visit, Stanhope used his mother's ashes to fill an artillery shell, so that she could join the fight against Russia. Together with Andy Andrist he recorded a few skits for "ПРОСТІР-ЧАС-Х*Й", a new album by Ukrainian punk-rock band "ПРОКЛЯТИЙ ***".

== Discography and videography ==
Title	Year	CD	DVD	Digital	Bootleg	Charted (US Billboard)
The Great White Stanhope	1998	X				
Sicko	1999	X				
Something to Take the Edge Off	2000	X				
ACID Bootleg	2001				X	
Die Laughing	2002	X				
Word of Mouth	2002		X			
Deadbeat Hero	2004	X	X			
Morbid Obscenity (The Unbookables)	2006	X				
No Refunds	2007	X (2008)	X			
From Across the Street	2009	X				
Oslo: Burning the Bridge to Nowhere	2011	X	X	X		Comedy Albums: No. 1; Heatseekers Albums: No. 2
Before Turning the Gun on Himself	2012	X	X			Comedy Albums: No. 1; Heatseekers Albums: No. 11
Beer Hall Putsch	2013	X	X	X		Comedy Albums: No. 1
No Place Like Home	2016	X		X		Comedy Albums: No. 1
Popov Vodka Presents: An Evening with Doug Stanhope	2017			X		Comedy Albums: No. 1
The Dying of a Last Breed	2020			X		
Discount Meat	2024			X		

== Books ==
Year	Title	ISBN	Publisher	Notes
2006	Fun with Pedophiles: The Best of Baiting	9780615135427	Shake The Baby Press	Self-Published
2016	Digging Up Mother: A Love Story	9780306824395	Grand Central Publishing	Foreword by Johnny Depp
2017	This Is Not Fame: A "From What I Re-Memoir"	9780306825743	Grand Central Publishing	Foreword by Drew Pinsky
2020	No Encore for the Donkey	9798842252916	(Independently Published)	Also on Audiobook / Kindle
