= Bridget Rice =

Irish politician (1885–1967)

Teachta Dála
- In office June 1938 – May 1954
- Constituency: Monaghan

Personal details
- Born: Bridget Mary Heneghan; 7 May 1885 Louisburgh, County Mayo, Ireland
- Died: 9 December 1967 (aged 82) County Monaghan, Ireland
- Party: Fianna Fáil
- Spouse: Eamon Rice (m. 1914)
- Children: 4
- Relatives: John Heneghan (brother)
- Education: Presentation Convent, Tuam

Bridget Mary Rice (née Heneghan; 7 May 1885 – 9 December 1967) was an Irish Fianna Fáil politician.

She was born on 7 May 1885 in Louisburgh, County Mayo to Walter Heneghan and Bridget McGreal. Her brother John Heneghan was a Columban priest. A postmistress, she married Eamon Rice on 1 September 1914, and they had four children.

Her husband Eamon Rice was a Fianna Fáil Teachta Dála (TD) for the Monaghan constituency from 1932 until his death in 1937. No by-election was held to fill his seat, but Bridget Rice was elected to Dáil Éireann as a Fianna Fáil TD at the 1938 general election for the same constituency. She was re-elected at each successive election until she retired from politics at the 1954 general election.

== See also ==
- Families in the Oireachtas

Dáil	Election	Deputy (Party)	Deputy (Party)	Deputy (Party)
2nd	1921	Seán MacEntee (SF)	Eoin O'Duffy (SF)	Ernest Blythe (SF)
3rd	1922	Patrick MacCarvill (AT-SF)	Eoin O'Duffy (PT-SF)	Ernest Blythe (PT-SF)
4th	1923	Patrick MacCarvill (Rep)	Patrick Duffy (CnaG)	Ernest Blythe (CnaG)
5th	1927 (Jun)	Patrick MacCarvill (FF)	Alexander Haslett (Ind.)	Ernest Blythe (CnaG)
6th	1927 (Sep)	Conn Ward (FF)	Alexander Haslett (Ind.)	Ernest Blythe (CnaG)
7th	1932	Conn Ward (FF)	Eamon Rice (FF)	Ernest Blythe (CnaG)
8th	1933	Conn Ward (FF)	Eamon Rice (FF)	Alexander Haslett (Ind.)
9th	1937	Conn Ward (FF)	Eamon Rice (FF)	James Dillon (FG)
10th	1938	Conn Ward (FF)	Bridget Rice (FF)	James Dillon (FG)
11th	1943	Conn Ward (FF)	Bridget Rice (FF)	James Dillon (Ind.)
12th	1944	Conn Ward (FF)	Bridget Rice (FF)	James Dillon (Ind.)
13th	1948	Patrick Maguire (FF)	Bridget Rice (FF)	James Dillon (Ind.)
14th	1951	Patrick Maguire (FF)	Bridget Rice (FF)	James Dillon (Ind.)
15th	1954	Patrick Mooney (FF)	Edward Kelly (FF)	James Dillon (FG)
16th	1957	Patrick Mooney (FF)	Eighneachán Ó hAnnluain (SF)	James Dillon (FG)
17th	1961	Patrick Mooney (FF)	Erskine H. Childers (FF)	James Dillon (FG)
18th	1965	Patrick Mooney (FF)	Erskine H. Childers (FF)	James Dillon (FG)
19th	1969	Billy Fox (FG)	Erskine H. Childers (FF)	John Conlan (FG)
20th	1973	Jimmy Leonard (FF)	Erskine H. Childers (FF)	John Conlan (FG)
20th	1973 by-election	Jimmy Leonard (FF)	Brendan Toal (FG)	John Conlan (FG)
21st	1977	Constituency abolished. See Cavan–Monaghan		
