= Before Turning the Gun on Himself =

Before Turning the Gun on Himself...

Live album by Doug Stanhope
- Released: November 6, 2012
- Recorded: 2012
- Venue: The Complex, Salt Lake City, Utah
- Genre: Comedy
- Length: 1:04:03
- Label: Roadrunner Records
- Producer: Brian Hennigan; Pierre Lamoureux

Doug Stanhope chronology
Oslo: Burning the Bridge to Nowhere (2011)	Before Turning the Gun on Himself... (2012)	Beer Hall Putsch (2013)

Professional ratings
Review scores
Source	Rating
AllMusic	4/5 stars

Before Turning the Gun on Himself... is the eighth stand-up comedy album by Doug Stanhope. It was released on November 6, 2012, by Roadrunner Records. It was recorded live at The Complex in Salt Lake City, Utah. The album peaked at #1 on the US Billboard Comedy Albums chart and #11 on the Heatseekers Albums chart.

== Track listing ==
CD
No.	Title	Length
1.	"Hangover"	3:19
2.	"Dr. Drew Is To Medicine What David Blaine Is To Science"	9:05
3.	"AA Is A Poorly Constructed Cult And Doesn't Work"	3:50
4.	"Just Move"	2:29
5.	"My Piss Stinks"	2:36
6.	"Simple Man"	3:01
7.	"Keynesian Economic Theory As Applied To Private Sector Independent Contracting"	4:12
8.	"Giant Black Cock"	5:53
9.	"It's A Party, Not Daycare, Asshole"	1:04
10.	"Bisbee Thrill Ride"	4:22
11.	"Art & The Unfortunate State Of The Japanese Undercarriage"	12:25
12.	"Remember When I Used To Give A Shit?/Killer Closer"	11:47

DVD
No.	Title	Length
1.	"Intro"	0:51
2.	"Hangover"	2:23
3.	"Dr. Drew Is To Medicine What David Blaine Is To Science"	9:08
4.	"AA Is A Poorly Constructed Cult And Doesn't Work"	3:49
5.	"Just Move"	2:28
6.	"My Piss Stinks"	2:38
7.	"Simple Man"	3:03
8.	"Keynesian Economic Theory As Applied To Private Sector Independent Contracting"	4:11
9.	"Giant Black Cock"	5:51
10.	"It's A Party, Not Daycare, Asshole"	1:06
11.	"Bisbee Thrill Ride"	4:22
12.	"Art & The Unfortunate State Of The Japanese Undercarriage"	12:25
13.	"Remember When I Used To Give A Shit?/Killer Closer"	11:34
14.	"Credits"	3:30
15.	"Louis C.K."	3:37
16.	"Mel Gibson"	3:39
Total length:		1:04:03

== Chart history ==
Chart (2012)	Peak position
US Heatseekers Albums (Billboard)	11
US Top Comedy Albums (Billboard)	1
