= Oslo: Burning the Bridge to Nowhere =

Live album by Doug Stanhope
- Released: May 3, 2011
- Recorded: September 18, 2009
- Venue: Fabrikkhallen, Oslo, Norway
- Genre: Comedy
- Length: 1:13:26 (CD version); 1:29:01 (DVD version w/o bonus)
- Label: Roadrunner Records
- Producer: Brian Hennigan; Emery Emery

Doug Stanhope chronology
From Across the Street (2009)	Oslo: Burning the Bridge to Nowhere (2011)	Before Turning the Gun on Himself (2012)

Professional ratings
Review scores
Source	Rating
AllMusic	4/5 stars

Oslo: Burning The Bridge To Nowhere is the seventh stand-up comedy album by American comedian Doug Stanhope. It was released on May 3, 2011, via Roadrunner Records. It was recorded live in Norway at a former sewing machine factory and Nazi World War II bunker in the Oslo borough of Grünerløkka on September 18, 2009. The album peaked at #1 on the US Billboard Comedy Albums chart and #2 on the Heatseekers Albums chart.

== Track listing ==
CD
No.	Title	Length
1.	"Noah"	2:25
2.	"New Oslo"	2:45
3.	"Royalty"	2:42
4.	"Dead People's Baggage"	1:57
5.	"Olympics"	2:00
6.	"Complete Unemployment"	0:54
7.	"What Have You Done for Me Lately?"	1:01
8.	"Stinkless Pussy"	1:06
9.	"Strong Target"	3:04
10.	"Spinning Dildo"	4:17
11.	"Go-Kart Track Massacre"	1:15
12.	"Suicide In Finland"	2:02
13.	"What's He Building In There?"	2:26
14.	"Abortion Is Green"	2:02
15.	"Stomping Kittens"	2:16
16.	"First Midget Bullfighter"	1:43
17.	"Ugly Woman Who Could Sing"	5:34
18.	"Spaceship to Glarkk"	4:17
19.	"Genghis Fuck Scenes"	2:27
20.	"Shame and Self-awareness"	1:58
21.	"Erectile Function"	0:43
22.	"Hello, Sarah?"	3:27
23.	"Blort"	7:52
24.	"Jizzoons"	0:54
25.	"Drambuie"	8:45
26.	"Freemarket Pussy"	2:34
Total length:		73:38

DVD
No.	Title	Length
1.	"Intro"	4:24
2.	"Noah"	2:42
3.	"New Oslo"	2:48
4.	"Royalty"	2:41
5.	"Dead People's Baggage"	1:56
6.	"Olympics"	1:59
7.	"Complete Unemployment"	0:55
8.	"What Have You Done for Me Lately?"	1:00
9.	"Stinkless Pussy"	1:06
10.	"Strong Target"	3:03
11.	"Spinning Dildo"	4:17
12.	"Go-Kart Track Massacre"	1:14
13.	"Suicide In Finland"	2:03
14.	"What's He Building In There?"	2:24
15.	"Abortion Is Green"	2:04
16.	"Stomping Kittens"	2:16
17.	"First Midget Bullfighter"	1:43
18.	"Ugly Woman Who Could Sing"	5:35
19.	"Spaceship To Glarkk"	4:17
20.	"Genghis Fuck Scenes"	3:27
21.	"Shame and Self-awareness"	1:58
22.	"Erectile Function"	0:40
23.	""Hello, Sarah?""	3:31
24.	"Blort"	7:51
25.	"Jizzoons"	0:53
26.	"Drambuie"	8:46
27.	"Freemarket Pussy"	3:01
28.	"Post-Show Stuff"	10:14
29.	"Octomom's Vagina" (Bonus)	1:22
Total length:		89:01

== Chart history ==
Chart (2011)	Peak position
US Heatseekers Albums (Billboard)	2
US Top Comedy Albums (Billboard)	1
