= Word of Mouth (film) =

- Directed by: Kevin Booth
- Starring: Doug Stanhope
- Distributed by: Sacred Cow Productions
- Release date: 2002
- Running time: 90 minutes
- Country: United States
- Language: English

Word of Mouth is Doug Stanhope's first stand-up DVD. It was recorded at the Velveeta Room in Austin, Texas on May 11, 2002, and produced by Sacred Cow Productions.

== Chapter listing ==
1. "Intro, Journey of 1000 Miles"
2. "Osama Bin Bigfoot"
3. "CNN Drinking Game"
4. "Tax Jesus"
5. "Prettiest Dennys Waitress"
6. "Would You Believe?"
7. "Hedging Your Bets"
8. "Heavy Handed Handshake"
9. "Vice Cop"
10. "Tit Fuck Joke"
11. "Smut Shop"
12. "Bar Sluts"
13. "STDs"
14. "Viable Human Being"
15. "Sodomy"
16. "Shake the Baby"
17. "Pro Abortion, Flipper Baby"
18. "Drug of Choice"
19. "Whisky Dicked, False Prophet"
20. "Jager Cock"
21. "Taste of Cum"
22. "Every Drug Should Be Legal"
23. "Rubber Fuck My Face"
24. "Transvestie Hooker"
25. "Excess in Moderation"
26. "War Torn Beaver"
27. "3 Legged Dog with an Itchy Belly"
28. "Industrial Porn"
29. "Final Cum Shot"
30. "Exit to Titty Bar"

== Extras ==
Bonus Features included on the DVD are "SHOCKING HOME VIDEO OF DRUG ABUSE GONE OUT OF CONTROL" (footage of Stanhope and friend Mat Becker on Mushrooms in a hotel room), "Tit Fuck Joke on PBS" (footage from the limo ride to The Yellow Rose strip club), a "Word of Mouth Music Video" featuring the song "My Lifes a Shambles" performed by the band Pufvin Vajona, and the "Theatrical Trailer".

A Target-brand antibacterial moist wipe was often included with the DVD.

== Easter Eggs ==
In the Chapter section of the DVD, there are two easter eggs: a martini glass (with video of Yellow Rose manager Don King making a toast to Doug and ex-wife Renee in an elevator) and a spilled martini glass (with additional footage from the strip club).

In the Extras section of the DVD, a cross can be found leading you to footage of Doug reading and tearing pages from the Holy Bible while on the toilet.
