= List of The Man Show episodes =

This is a list of the 95 episodes of the comedy television series The Man Show, airing on Comedy Central from 1999 to 2004 that starred Adam Carolla and Jimmy Kimmel; the final 22 episodes were hosted by Doug Stanhope and Joe Rogan, before its cancellation in 2004.

== Series overview ==
Season	Episodes	Originally released	
Season	Episodes	First released	Last released
1	22	June 16, 1999	January 26, 2000
2	26	June 18, 2000	March 25, 2001
3	26	July 1, 2001	March 3, 2002
4	21	August 11, 2002	May 11, 2003
5	11	August 17, 2003	November 2, 2003
6	11	May 2, 2004	June 19, 2004

== Episodes ==
=== Season 1 (1999–2000) ===
No. overall	No. in season	Title	Original release date
1	1	"Oprahization"	June 16, 1999
Sketches: Hoover Dam, The History Of Man, Father & Son With Jimmy And Kevin Kimmel, Man-O-Vations, Help Stop Women's Suffrage, Cindy Crawford's Bathroom Talk, Audience Q&A
2	2	"They Don't Want Sex as Much as We Do"	June 23, 1999
Sketches: Household Hints From Adult Film Stars (Serenity & Julia Ann), Movies Men Don't Want To See, Fat Times At Ridgemont High, How It Really Happened, Will You Have Sex With Me?
3	3	"Bad Old Days"	June 30, 1999
Sketches: Kids Tell Jokes, Can I Have A Bite Of That?, Household Hints From Adult Film Stars (Jenna Jameson), Jimmy's New Son, Audience Q&A
4	4	"Appearances"	June 30, 1999
Sketches: Get To Know Your Juggies (Vanessa Kay), Man-O-Vations, Father & Son With Jimmy And Kevin Kimmel, Adam At The Hardware Store
5	5	"Bets/Zembic"	July 7, 1999
Sketches: Shaving Dave, Eat A Stick Of Butter For $100, Male Breast Implants For $100,000, Cutting In Line At Star Wars, If Adam Had A Son, How It Really Happened, Audience Q&A
6	6	"Bathroom"	July 14, 1999
Sketches: Protesting The Man Show, Bathroom Interviews, When Adam Is King, The Legend Of The Fox
7	7	"Drinking"	July 21, 1999
Sketches: Drunks Do The Darndest Things, The Man Show Hall Of Fame (Scott Baio), Household Hints From Adult Film Stars (Serenity), Adam Dates His Mom, Audience Q&A
8	8	"Wedding"	July 28, 1999
Sketches: Household Hints From Adult Film Stars (Stephanie Swift), Weddings Don't Have To Blow, Jimmy Talks To Grooms, Great Moments In Weddings, Audience Q&A
9	9	"Sports"	August 4, 1999
Sketches: Rest Assured Disposal Service, Movies Men Don't Want To See, Raging Ass, Great Moments In Sports, How To Watch Baseball, Father & Son With Jimmy And Kevin Kimmel
10	10	"Compilation"	August 11, 1999
A clip show.
11	11	"Jobs"	November 3, 1999
Sketches: The Monkey Bar, Great Moments In Sports, Man-O-Vations, Adam Pampers Day Labourers, Household Hints From Adult Film Stars (Jenna Jameson)
12	12	"Mysteries of Women"	November 10, 1999
Sketches: What Are You Broads Thinking?, What Jimmy's Wife Does All Day, How To Fish, Father & Son With Jimmy And Kevin Kimmel, Audience Q&A
13	13	"Underwear"	November 17, 1999
Sketches: May I See Your Underwear?, How To rent Porn, Adam Teaches Shop Class, Father & Son With Jimmy And Kevin Kimmel
14	14	"Thanks Man Show"	November 24, 1999
Sketches: Thanks Man Show, When Adam Is King, Adam & Jimmy At The Buffet, The Monkey Bar, Household Hints From Adult Film Stars (Nikki Tyler), Audience Q&A
15	15	"The Woman Show"	December 1, 1999
Sketches: Jimmy Loses His Baby, My Daughter's Out Of Control, Connie The Craft Lady, Stand-up Comedian Toni, Family Reunion, Someone's Got A Secret Admirer, Audience Member Makeover
16	16	"Veal"	December 8, 1999
Sketches: Get To Know Your Juggies (Angelique Gorges), The Man Show Hall Of Fame (André the Giant), The Monkey Bar, Adam Goes To A Veal Ranch, How It Really Happened, If Adam Had A Son, The Fox Drinks Upside-down
17	17	"Practical Jokes"	December 15, 1999
Sketches: Lottery Practical Joke, The Monkey Bar, Household Hints From Adult Film Stars (Brittany Andrews), Does Size Matter?, Porn On A String, Gag-O-Vations
18	18	"Holiday Show"	December 22, 1999
Sketches: Household Hints From Adult Film Stars (Jacklyn Lick), Christmas Shopping With Juggies, The Monkey Bar, When Adam Is Santa
19	19	"Millennium"	December 29, 1999
Sketches: Household Hints From Adult Film Stars (Devon & Jenteal), Millen-O-Vations, The Monkey Bar, The Millennium In Review
20	20	"New Year's Resolution Show"	December 31, 1999
Sketches: Wife School, Father & Son With Jimmy And Kevin Kimmel, Jimmy's Wife's Bathroom, Adam Finds A Wife For Sam, How It Really Happened, The Monkey Bar
21	21	"Compilation 2"	January 5, 2000
A clip show.
22	22	"Super Bowl Show"	January 26, 2000
Sketches: Super Bowl Trip Slideshow, The Monkey Bar, Tailgate-O-Vations, How To Throw A Super Bowl Party

=== Season 2 (2000–01) ===
No. overall	No. in season	Title	Original release date
23	1	"More Juggies!"	June 18, 2000
Sketches: Previously On The Man Show, Get To Know Your Juggies (Julie & Shawnie Costello), Household Hints From Adult Film Stars (Kobe Tai), Pro Wrestling School, Man-O-Vations, Great Moments In Nature, Audience Q&A, The Fox Tribute
24	2	"The Man Show Boy"	June 25, 2000
Sketches: The Man Show Boy Helps "Old Ladies", The Monkey Bar, Father & Son With Jimmy And Kevin Kimmel, Snoop Dogg's House, Museum Of Annoying Guys, Audience Q&A
25	3	"Husbandly Duties"	July 2, 2000
Sketches: Lady Sitters, Get To Know Your Juggies (Nicole Rodriguez), Cher Concert, Wheel Of Destiny
26	4	"Powerful Women"	July 9, 2000
Sketches: The 3 Most Powerful Women, Father & Son With Jimmy And Kevin Kimmel, Camel Toe Match Game / Breaking News, Rosie In A Well, Hair Replacement, Audience Q&A
27	5	"Will You Buy Me A Beer?"	July 16, 2000
Sketches: The Man Show Boy (Will You Buy Me A Beer?), Movies Men Do Want To See, Ground Justice, Adam At The Dump, Karl Malone On The Internet, Audience Q&A
28	6	"Introducing Karl Malone"	July 23, 2000
Sketches: Karl Malone On Being A Man, The Amazing Chocolate Diet, Boys Gone Wild 2, Men With Bad Names, Audience Q&A
29	7	"TV Shows"	July 30, 2000
Sketches: Jimmy On Gilligan's Island, Beach-O-Vations, Father & Son With Jimmy And Kevin Kimmel, At The Beach With The Juggies, Audience Q&A
30	8	"For Women: How To Get A Man"	August 6, 2000
Sketches: Stop Eating So Much, Pure Retro Rockin' Rock, Bathroom Interviews, Get To Know Your Juggies (Dani Lee), Juggy Talent Show
31	9	"We Donate To Charity"	August 13, 2000
Sketches: Camcorders For Lesbians, Adam & Jimmy After Death, Guess Your Weight, Great Moments In Stupidity, Man Vs. Beast, Monkey Bar, Natasha Henstridge
32	10	"Sports Show"	August 20, 2000
Sketches: Basketball With Costello Twins, Adam Plays Football With The Oakland Raiders, Karl Malone On Diet & Exercise, Jamal Anderson, The Man Show Hall Of Fame (Frank Gifford)
33	11	"Myths & Facts About College"	August 27, 2000
Sketches: Myths & Facts About College, The Man Show Boy Picks Up College Chicks, Father & Son With Jimmy And Kevin Kimmel, Adam & Jimmy At Spring Break, Fraternity Action Heroes, School-O-Vations
34	12	"Election Smear Campaigns"	September 3, 2000
Sketches: Adam & Jimmy Smear Ads, Campaigning, Karl Malone On Being President, If A Woman Were President, Debate / Mud Wrestling
35	13	"Hef's House (Best Of)"	September 10, 2000
A clip show.
36	14	"Juggy Training"	December 3, 2000
Sketches: Juggy Academy, Jimmy With X-Ray Glasses, X-Ray Funnies, Ask Mr. Hardware, Karl Malone On The NRA, Audience Q&A
37	15	"Benny Hill"	December 10, 2000
Sketches: Adam's Tribute To Benny Hill, Jimmy's Monkey Wife, Wheel Of Destiny
38	16	"Holiday Show"	December 17, 2000
Sketches: The Man Show Home Game, Father & Son With Jimmy And Kevin Kimmel, Hanukkah With Goldberg, The Poopflingers, Gift Ideas, Karl Malone On Christmas
39	17	"Girl Scouts"	January 7, 2001
Sketches: The Man Show Boy Sells Cookies, Man Show Deodorant, The Man Show Talent Show, Karl Malone On Dogs, Get To Know Your Juggies (Nicole Pulliam), Audience Q&A
40	18	"Car Show"	January 14, 2001
Sketches: Car Insurance, Antique Pornshow, Adopt A Stripper Foundation, Museum Of Annoying Guys, Great Moments In Stupidity, Father & Son With Jimmy And Kevin Kimmel, Audience Q&A
41	19	"Work Place Behavior"	January 21, 2001
Sketches: Should Women Be Treated Equally In The Work Place?, Father & Son With Jimmy And Kevin Kimmel, Girls Jumping On Trampolines Auditions, When Adam Is King, Karl Malone On World Hunger, Audience Q&A
42	20	"Credit Cards"	February 4, 2001
Sketches: Credit Card Abuse, You Can't Win Theatre, Camp Spreading Eagle, The Poopflingers, Hypnotist Tom Silver
43	21	"Sex Show"	February 11, 2001
Sketches: Man Show Industries, How Often Do You Masturbate?, Adam & Danni Ashe, Father & Son With Jimmy And Kevin Kimmel, Sex-O-Vations, The Poopflingers, Audience Q&A
44	22	"Teaching Women About The Work Place"	February 18, 2001
Sketches: Jimmy Takes His Daughter To Work, Karl Malone On Music, Adam & Jimmy In Korn (Behind The Music), Jimmy Vs. Vanessa (Will You Fix My Car?), The Poopflingers, Audience Q&A
45	23	"Phone Sex"	February 25, 2001
Sketches: 1-600-Man-Show, Get To Know Your Juggies (Paula Harrison), Adam & Jimmy Teach Little League, Bride Evaluation, Karl Malone On Lesbians, Audience Q&A
46	24	"Laziness"	March 4, 2001
Sketches: Angelique's Hide-A-Key, Movies Men Don't Want To See, Great Moments In Cinema, Porky's 2001, The Poopflingers, Audience Q&A
47	25	"International Customs About Sex"	March 11, 2001
Sketches: Men Around The World, Jimmy Becomes A Midget, Great Moments In TV, Father & Son With Jimmy And Katie Kimmel, When Adam Is King, Audience Q&A
48	26	"Jamaica"	March 25, 2001
A clip show.

=== Season 3 (2001–02) ===
No. overall	No. in season	Title	Original release date
49	1	"Sperm Bank"	July 1, 2001
Sketches: Yokozuna, Sperm Bank, Strip Club Do's and Don'ts, Oprah Magazine
50	2	"Drunken Pilots"	July 8, 2001
Sketches: 1950s Dildo Commercial, Karl Malone on Death, Drunken Pilots, Would You Like A Little Gravy On That?, Audience Q&A
51	3	"Got Gas"	July 15, 2001
Sketches: What Would Adam Do?, Merage Cologne, Museum of Annoying Guys, Audience Q&A
52	4	"Sock Puppet Porn"	July 22, 2001
Sketches: Toilet Money, Sock Puppet Porn, What Would Adam Do?, Jimmy Kimmel: Hot Dog Vendor, Audience Q&A
53	5	"Salute To Advertising"	July 29, 2001
Sketches: Mascot Salute, Mascul-OUT, How Much To See You French Kiss?, Ask Mr. Hardware, Audience Q&A
54	6	"Oprah Jimfrey"	August 5, 2001
Sketches: Oprah Jimfrey, Adam Visits Sex Toy Factory, Man Show Miracle (Told Funny Story), Wheel of Destiny, Eat Jimmy's Weiner
55	7	"Man Show Boy Hits The Beach"	August 12, 2001
Sketches: Guys Looking At Juggies, Adam Boxes Mark Breland, Oprah Jimfrey, Man Show Boy At The Beach, Man Show Miracle (Masturbated to "The View"), Audience Q&A
56	8	"Movie Show"	August 19, 2001
Sketches: Jimmy Sex Tape, Hollywood Tour, Karl Malone on Movies, Movies Men Don't Want To See, Man Show Salutes the Video Camera, Audience Q&A
57	9	"Juggy Water Park"	August 26, 2001
Sketches: Die Like A Man, Adam Helps At Auto Parts Store, Great Moments in Stupidity, Oprah Jimfrey, Jimmy and Adam Visit A Sick Kid, Audience Q&A
58	10	"Labor Day Special"	September 2, 2001
Sketches: Women Spending Men's Money, Worst Jobs in America, Jock-Strap Divas, Turkey Breeding Demonstration
59	11	"Breast Feeding Juggies"	September 9, 2001
Sketches: Angelique Breast Feeding, Tobias, Man-O-Vations, Audience Q&A
60	12	"Man Show Boy Gets A Fake ID"	September 16, 2001
Sketches: Port-A-Juggy, Man Show Boys Gets A Fake ID, Karl Malone on Diversity, Adam At Barbra Streisand Concert, Great Moments In Yokozuna, Audience Q&A
61	13	"Las Vegas (Best Of)"	September 23, 2001
A clip show.
62	14	"Man Show Boy Sells Beer"	December 2, 2001
Sketches: Man Show Boy Sells Beer, Wheel of Destiny, "You Can't Win" Theatre, Phone Sex Psychic, Audience Q&A
63	15	"Elevator Full Of Juggies"	December 9, 2001
Sketches: Citizens For A Sexier Statue of Liberty, Elevator Full of Juggies, Great Moments in Stupidity, How's It Hangin'?, Audience Q&A
64	16	"Juggs Judy"	December 16, 2001
Sketches: Adam Teaches Karate, Jimmy Plays Catch, Juggs Judy, "You Can't Win" Theatre, Good Time Party Boys Masturbation Safety Tips, Audience Q&A
65	17	"Christmas Show"	December 23, 2001
Sketches: Holiday Sock Puppet Porn, Holiday-O-Vations, Juggs Judy, Santa Karl Malone, Audience Q&A
66	18	"Toplessness In America"	December 30, 2001
Sketches: Crack Spackle, Father & Son With Jimmy and Kevin Kimmel, Toplessness In America, Man Show Fashion Show, Audience Q&A
67	19	"Bathroom Interviews"	January 6, 2002
Sketches: Hair Alternative Treatment, Bathroom Interviews, When Adam Is King, Audience Q&A
68	20	"Undercover Bartenders"	January 13, 2002
Sketches: Undercover Bartenders, What Would Adam Do?, Beer For Pets, Drunken Pilots, Karl Malone on Marijuana, Man Show Salutes Hot Wings, Audience Q&A
69	21	"Officer Adam"	January 20, 2002
Sketches: Manpons, Officer Adam, Karl Malone on Health, Father & Son With Jimmy and Kevin Kimmel, Golf, Audience Q&A
70	22	"Wife Disguise Kit"	January 27, 2002
Sketches: "The Birds and The Bees" With Jimmy's Mom, Wife Disguise Kit, Man Show Salutes "The Pill", Wheel of Destiny, What Would Adam Do?
71	23	"Assoholics Anonymous"	February 10, 2002
Sketches: Assoholics Anonymous, Adam Adopts The Man Show Boy, Karl Malone on Aliens, Jerkins, Ask Mr. Hardware, Audience Q&A
72	24	"Mardi Gras"	February 17, 2002
Sketches: Mardi Gras Slideshow, The Mystery of Beads, Father & Son With Jimmy and Kevin Kimmel, Mardi Gras Surprise, Karl Malone's Louisiana Tour
73	25	"Outdoor Show"	February 24, 2002
Sketches: Beavers, Fishing With William "The Refrigerator" Perry, Outdoor Safety Tips, Audience Q&A
74	26	"Wild Wild West Spectacular"	March 3, 2002
A clip show.

=== Season 4 (2002–03) ===
No. overall	No. in season	Title	Original release date
75	1	"Juggy Auditions"	August 11, 2002
Sketches: Juggy Casting Call, Adam and Jimmy Interviews, Juggy Audition Finalists
76	2	"Women And Sex"	August 18, 2002
Sketches: Marriageol, Best Way To A Bigger Penis, What The Fuck?, Man Show Haiku, Adam As Gas Station Attendant, Audience Q&A
77	3	"Man Show Boy Phenomena"	August 25, 2002
Sketches: Man Show Boy Rates Women, Dodgers Spring Training, Father & Son With Jimmy and Kevin Kimmel, Wheel of Destiny
78	4	"Bosom Springs"	September 1, 2002
Sketches: Bosom Springs, Day of Beauty, What The Fuck?, Adam's Exfoliating Treatment, Charlton Heston's Penis, Audience Q&A
79	5	"Learn To Be A Pimp"	September 8, 2002
Sketches: I Dream of Jeannie, Great Moments In Nature, Learn To Be A Pimp, Audience Q&A
80	6	"The Juggbournes"	September 15, 2002
Sketches: The Juggbournes, Wheel of Destiny, Uglyville
81	7	"Topless Juggy Car Wash"	September 22, 2002
Sketches: Topless Juggy Car Wash, Life on the Road, Charlton Heston's Penis, Karl Malone on Wiping, Museum of Annoying Drunks
82	8	"The Bra"	September 29, 2002
Sketches: Jimmy Unhooks Bras In Under 10 Seconds, Charlton Heston's Penis, Cooperstown Condoms, Adam SWAT Team Tryout, Man Show Boy With A Puppy, What The Fuck?, Audience Q&A
83	9	"Casual Sex Friday"	October 6, 2002
Sketches: Talking Deer, Casual Sex Friday, Charlton Heston's Penis, Adam As Gas Station Attendant, Great Moments In Mexican Midget Bullfighting, Audience Q&A
84	10	"Penis Names"	October 13, 2002
Sketches: Penis Names, Adam The Garbage Man, Guess What's In My Pants, Audience Q&A
85	11	"Sports-O-Vations"	October 30, 2002
Sketches: Will You Buy This For Me?, Sports-O-Vations, Father & Son With Jimmy and Kevin Kimmel, Dr. Stephano's Anal Emporium
86	12	"Bachelorette Party"	March 2, 2003
Sketches: Man Show Academy of Art, Charlton Heston's Penis, Bachelorette Party, Ask Mr. Hardware, Audience Q&A
87	13	"Adam And Jimmy In Jail"	March 2, 2003
Sketches: Wondrous World of Pornography, Adam and Jimmy In Jail, The Juggbournes, Donate Your Mate, Audience Q&A
88	14	"100 Shots with Super Dave"	March 9, 2003
Sketches: Women Lie About Their Weight, 100 Shots With Super Dave Osborne, Wacky Back, Camp Kournikova, Audience Q&A
89	15	"Wheel of Destiny"	March 16, 2003
Sketches: Porn Flakes, Wheel of Destiny, Pool With Jeanette Lee, Women In Sports
90	16	"Kids"	March 23, 2003
Sketches: Kegos, Women In Sports, Wrestle Cousin Sal, Tobias, Audience Q&A
91	17	"Apologizing"	March 30, 2003
Sketches: Man Show Boy Apologizes, Vacation to the Swamp, Man Show Haiku, Charlton Heston's Penis, Wheel of Destiny
92	18	"Horse Racing"	April 6, 2003
Sketches: Blow Darts, Karl Malone on History, A Day at the Track, Museum of Annoying Women, Audience Q&A
93	19	"Lesbians and Rosie"	April 20, 2003
Sketches: Would You Have Sex With Rosie O'Donnell?, Adam Visits Jack LaLanne, Man-O-Vations, Women In Sports, Cousin Sal's Fart
94	20	"Final Show"	May 4, 2003
Sketches: Adam Clone, Playboy Photographers, Look Back At The Man Show, Goodbye Toast
95	21	"Best of"	May 11, 2003
Sketches: A clip show.

=== Season 5 (2003) ===
Eleven episodes, the first airing 17 August 2003. Hosts Doug Stanhope and Joe Rogan. Season episode data at IMDB

=== Season 6 (2004) ===
Eleven episodes, the first airing 2 May 2004. Hosts Doug Stanhope and Joe Rogan. Season episode data at IMDB
