= Alexander Haslett =

Irish politician (1883–1951)

Teachta Dála
- In office January 1933 – July 1937
- In office June 1927 – February 1932
- Constituency: Monaghan

Personal details
- Born: 24 July 1883 Glaslough, County Monaghan, Ireland
- Died: 17 January 1951 (aged 67) County Monaghan, Ireland
- Party: Independent
- Spouse: Martha Steenson
- Children: 2

Alexander Haslett (24 July 1883 – 17 January 1951) was an Irish Independent politician. He was an independent TD for the Monaghan constituency in Dáil Éireann from June 1927 to 1932 and from 1933 to 1937. He stood as an "unofficial Protestant candidate". His failure to be elected in both 1937 and 1943 was due to the continuing decline in numbers of the Protestant population in County Monaghan. Fine Gael also ran a Protestant candidate (Ernest Blythe).

He was born on 24 July 1883 in Glaslough, County Monaghan, the youngest son among four sons and one daughter of James Haslett, farmer, and Mary Haslett (née Watt). He was educated at Glaslough national school, while each of his siblings emigrated to the US, he farmed the family holding at Derryvane, selling it in 1921 to purchase a substantially larger farm at Mulladuff. Elected in 1912 to Monaghan rural council and board of guardians, he was secretary until 1920 of the Monaghan branch of the Ulster Farmers' Union.

In the mid-1920s he launched an auctioneering business in Glaslough and Monaghan town, and served as council member and sometime president of the Irish Auctioneers' Association. He was active in the Orange Order, he became prominent locally in the affiliated Protestant Defence Association (organised in 1920 amid the political violence of the time) at a time when unionists in Monaghan and throughout the twenty-six southern counties were assessing their position in the face of devolved government, and the exclusion of three Ulster counties from Northern Ireland.

Haslett was a Presbyterian – a member of the Ballyalbany Congregation in Monaghan town – who had purchased his own small farm under the Land Purchase (Ireland) Act 1903. He was a very prominent member of the Orange Order and served as Deputy County Grand Master for Monaghan. He has been described as one of those who "were determined not only to stay but with dignity to play their part and make a contribution to the local commercial and political life" "On 12 July 1923 the only Orange demonstration to be held in the Free State that year took place at Killacoonagh near Clones. Alexander Haslett ... addressing the Orangemen that day said: 'We are not going to be sulking in a corner. We have to live in this country and we are going to make the best of it.'", cited in.

Dáil	Election	Deputy (Party)	Deputy (Party)	Deputy (Party)
2nd	1921	Seán MacEntee (SF)	Eoin O'Duffy (SF)	Ernest Blythe (SF)
3rd	1922	Patrick MacCarvill (AT-SF)	Eoin O'Duffy (PT-SF)	Ernest Blythe (PT-SF)
4th	1923	Patrick MacCarvill (Rep)	Patrick Duffy (CnaG)	Ernest Blythe (CnaG)
5th	1927 (Jun)	Patrick MacCarvill (FF)	Alexander Haslett (Ind.)	Ernest Blythe (CnaG)
6th	1927 (Sep)	Conn Ward (FF)	Alexander Haslett (Ind.)	Ernest Blythe (CnaG)
7th	1932	Conn Ward (FF)	Eamon Rice (FF)	Ernest Blythe (CnaG)
8th	1933	Conn Ward (FF)	Eamon Rice (FF)	Alexander Haslett (Ind.)
9th	1937	Conn Ward (FF)	Eamon Rice (FF)	James Dillon (FG)
10th	1938	Conn Ward (FF)	Bridget Rice (FF)	James Dillon (FG)
11th	1943	Conn Ward (FF)	Bridget Rice (FF)	James Dillon (Ind.)
12th	1944	Conn Ward (FF)	Bridget Rice (FF)	James Dillon (Ind.)
13th	1948	Patrick Maguire (FF)	Bridget Rice (FF)	James Dillon (Ind.)
14th	1951	Patrick Maguire (FF)	Bridget Rice (FF)	James Dillon (Ind.)
15th	1954	Patrick Mooney (FF)	Edward Kelly (FF)	James Dillon (FG)
16th	1957	Patrick Mooney (FF)	Eighneachán Ó hAnnluain (SF)	James Dillon (FG)
17th	1961	Patrick Mooney (FF)	Erskine H. Childers (FF)	James Dillon (FG)
18th	1965	Patrick Mooney (FF)	Erskine H. Childers (FF)	James Dillon (FG)
19th	1969	Billy Fox (FG)	Erskine H. Childers (FF)	John Conlan (FG)
20th	1973	Jimmy Leonard (FF)	Erskine H. Childers (FF)	John Conlan (FG)
20th	1973 by-election	Jimmy Leonard (FF)	Brendan Toal (FG)	John Conlan (FG)
21st	1977	Constituency abolished. See Cavan–Monaghan		
