= Patrick Maguire (politician) =

Irish politician (died 1970)

Teachta Dála
- In office February 1948 – May 1954
- Constituency: Monaghan

Personal details
- Born: County Monaghan, Ireland
- Died: 4 July 1970
- Party: Fianna Fáil

Patrick J. Maguire (died 4 July 1970) was an Irish Fianna Fáil politician. A medical doctor, he was elected to Dáil Éireann as a Teachta Dála (TD) for the Monaghan constituency at the 1948 general election, and was re-elected at the 1951 general election. He did not contest the 1954 general election.

Dáil	Election	Deputy (Party)	Deputy (Party)	Deputy (Party)
2nd	1921	Seán MacEntee (SF)	Eoin O'Duffy (SF)	Ernest Blythe (SF)
3rd	1922	Patrick MacCarvill (AT-SF)	Eoin O'Duffy (PT-SF)	Ernest Blythe (PT-SF)
4th	1923	Patrick MacCarvill (Rep)	Patrick Duffy (CnaG)	Ernest Blythe (CnaG)
5th	1927 (Jun)	Patrick MacCarvill (FF)	Alexander Haslett (Ind.)	Ernest Blythe (CnaG)
6th	1927 (Sep)	Conn Ward (FF)	Alexander Haslett (Ind.)	Ernest Blythe (CnaG)
7th	1932	Conn Ward (FF)	Eamon Rice (FF)	Ernest Blythe (CnaG)
8th	1933	Conn Ward (FF)	Eamon Rice (FF)	Alexander Haslett (Ind.)
9th	1937	Conn Ward (FF)	Eamon Rice (FF)	James Dillon (FG)
10th	1938	Conn Ward (FF)	Bridget Rice (FF)	James Dillon (FG)
11th	1943	Conn Ward (FF)	Bridget Rice (FF)	James Dillon (Ind.)
12th	1944	Conn Ward (FF)	Bridget Rice (FF)	James Dillon (Ind.)
13th	1948	Patrick Maguire (FF)	Bridget Rice (FF)	James Dillon (Ind.)
14th	1951	Patrick Maguire (FF)	Bridget Rice (FF)	James Dillon (Ind.)
15th	1954	Patrick Mooney (FF)	Edward Kelly (FF)	James Dillon (FG)
16th	1957	Patrick Mooney (FF)	Eighneachán Ó hAnnluain (SF)	James Dillon (FG)
17th	1961	Patrick Mooney (FF)	Erskine H. Childers (FF)	James Dillon (FG)
18th	1965	Patrick Mooney (FF)	Erskine H. Childers (FF)	James Dillon (FG)
19th	1969	Billy Fox (FG)	Erskine H. Childers (FF)	John Conlan (FG)
20th	1973	Jimmy Leonard (FF)	Erskine H. Childers (FF)	John Conlan (FG)
20th	1973 by-election	Jimmy Leonard (FF)	Brendan Toal (FG)	John Conlan (FG)
21st	1977	Constituency abolished. See Cavan–Monaghan		
