= Conn Ward =

Irish politician (1891–1966)

Parliamentary Secretary
- 1932–1946: Local Government and Public Health

Teachta Dála
- In office September 1927 – February 1948
- Constituency: Monaghan

Personal details
- Born: Francis Constantine Ward; 12 February 1891 Donaghmoyne, County Monaghan, Ireland
- Died: 15 December 1966 (aged 75) Dublin, Ireland
- Party: Fianna Fáil
- Spouse: Sheila Ward
- Children: 6
- Education: University College Dublin

Military service
- Allegiance: Irish Volunteers; Irish Republican Army; Anti-Treaty IRA
- Battles/wars: Irish War of Independence; Irish Civil War

Francis Constantine Ward (12 February 1891 – 15 December 1966) was an Irish Fianna Fáil politician and medical doctor.

== Early life ==
He was born on 12 February 1891 in Corlygorm, Donaghmoyne, County Monaghan, son of Patrick Ward, a farmer, and Elizabeth Ruddin. He was educated at the Patrician Brothers' schools, Carrickmacross, and studied medicine at University College Dublin (UCD). While a student at UCD he was a founder-member of the Irish Volunteers at the Dublin Rotunda meeting on 25 November 1913. He qualified as a doctor in 1914, and was medical officer in Scotstown, County Monaghan from 1915 to 1919, and Dundalk, County Louth from 1919 to 1920. He was selected to contest the 1918 general election for Sinn Féin in Monaghan North, but stood aside in favour of Ernest Blythe, who won the seat.

== Revolutionary period ==
He fought with the Irish Republican Army (IRA) in his native county in the Irish War of Independence and on the Republican side in the Irish Civil War, having opposed the Anglo-Irish Treaty. A senior officer in the IRA, by the July 1921 truce he held the rank of colonel-commandant.

== Politics ==
He was a founder member of Fianna Fáil. He was an unsuccessful candidate at the June 1927 general election, but was first elected to Dáil Éireann at the September 1927 general election for the Monaghan constituency and was re-elected at each subsequent general election until his retirement in 1948. After Fianna Fáil's victory at the 1932 general election he was appointed Parliamentary Secretary to the Minister for Local Government and Public Health. He retained this junior ministerial rank through the 1930s and into the 1940s.

== Parliamentary Secretary for Public Health ==
He served under successive ministers Seán T. O'Kelly and Seán MacEntee, and was delegated ever-increasing responsibility for health and public assistance. During the 1930s he concentrated resources on overhaul and extension of the hospital system. He utilised funds made available to the department from the hospitals sweepstakes, he authorised construction of twenty-four county and district hospitals and fourteen specialist hospitals. He established an advisory hospitals commission and unified friendly societies into a single national health insurance society. During this time he was effectively the Minister for Health. Frequently consulting with catholic church authorities (notably Dublin archbishop John Charles McQuaid) over medical matters, at whose behest he banned sale of the newly marketed sanitary tampons in 1944, out of concerns regarding "the sexual arousal of girls at an impressionable age".

=== John MacCarvill controversy ===
In 1946, Ward became the subject of a major political controversy that ended his ministerial career. At the time, he was managing director and majority shareholder of the Monaghan Curing Company and was expected to be promoted to cabinet as Ireland prepared to establish a separate Department of Health. The controversy arose after the dismissal of the company's manager, John MacCarvill, whom Ward intended to replace with his own son. The dismissal prompted John MacCarvill's brother, Dr Patrick MacCarvill, a physician and former Fianna Fáil TD, to submit a formal complaint to Taoiseach Éamon de Valera.

Patrick MacCarvill's complaint extended beyond the dismissal, alleging that Ward had received payments from the salaries of temporary medical officers employed during his absence from medical practice, and that certain bacon sales had been conducted outside the company's official accounts. De Valera considered the allegations sufficiently serious to warrant public discussion in the Dáil, arguing that any question concerning Ward's conduct reflected upon the government. Ward initially proposed legal proceedings for libel, but subsequently requested that the matter be referred to a judicial tribunal of inquiry.

The tribunal sat for nine days and cleared Ward of the principal allegations, including those relating to the dismissal of John MacCarvill, concluding that he had acted in what he considered to be the company's best interests. However, it found that the company had engaged in some undeclared trading and that Ward and other directors had submitted incomplete tax returns relating to income from the business. During the inquiry, Ward was relieved of his duties as Parliamentary Secretary and subsequently resigned from office.

The affair effectively ended Ward's prospects of cabinet promotion and marked the collapse of his political career. Feeling that he had received insufficient support from his colleagues, Ward resigned from Fianna Fáil later in 1946, did not return to Leinster House, and did not contest the 1948 general election. MacCarvill also left Fianna Fáil over the dispute and stood for the upstart republican party Clann na Poblachta in Monaghan in 1948.

The Ward scandal contributed to the undermining of public confidence in the Fianna Fáil government and its 1948 electoral defeat. The substance of the 1945 health bill, purged of its more draconian features, was incorporated into the 1947 public health act, the basis of the 1951 Mother and Child Scheme crisis when minister Noël Browne sought to implement its relevant provisions.

== After politics ==
He retired from politics at the 1948 general election, and resumed his medical practice. He died in Dublin, on 15 December 1966, survived by his wife Sheila, four sons and two daughters.

Political offices
New office	Parliamentary Secretary to the Local Government and Public Health; 1932–1946	Office abolished

Dáil	Election	Deputy (Party)	Deputy (Party)	Deputy (Party)
2nd	1921	Seán MacEntee (SF)	Eoin O'Duffy (SF)	Ernest Blythe (SF)
3rd	1922	Patrick MacCarvill (AT-SF)	Eoin O'Duffy (PT-SF)	Ernest Blythe (PT-SF)
4th	1923	Patrick MacCarvill (Rep)	Patrick Duffy (CnaG)	Ernest Blythe (CnaG)
5th	1927 (Jun)	Patrick MacCarvill (FF)	Alexander Haslett (Ind.)	Ernest Blythe (CnaG)
6th	1927 (Sep)	Conn Ward (FF)	Alexander Haslett (Ind.)	Ernest Blythe (CnaG)
7th	1932	Conn Ward (FF)	Eamon Rice (FF)	Ernest Blythe (CnaG)
8th	1933	Conn Ward (FF)	Eamon Rice (FF)	Alexander Haslett (Ind.)
9th	1937	Conn Ward (FF)	Eamon Rice (FF)	James Dillon (FG)
10th	1938	Conn Ward (FF)	Bridget Rice (FF)	James Dillon (FG)
11th	1943	Conn Ward (FF)	Bridget Rice (FF)	James Dillon (Ind.)
12th	1944	Conn Ward (FF)	Bridget Rice (FF)	James Dillon (Ind.)
13th	1948	Patrick Maguire (FF)	Bridget Rice (FF)	James Dillon (Ind.)
14th	1951	Patrick Maguire (FF)	Bridget Rice (FF)	James Dillon (Ind.)
15th	1954	Patrick Mooney (FF)	Edward Kelly (FF)	James Dillon (FG)
16th	1957	Patrick Mooney (FF)	Eighneachán Ó hAnnluain (SF)	James Dillon (FG)
17th	1961	Patrick Mooney (FF)	Erskine H. Childers (FF)	James Dillon (FG)
18th	1965	Patrick Mooney (FF)	Erskine H. Childers (FF)	James Dillon (FG)
19th	1969	Billy Fox (FG)	Erskine H. Childers (FF)	John Conlan (FG)
20th	1973	Jimmy Leonard (FF)	Erskine H. Childers (FF)	John Conlan (FG)
20th	1973 by-election	Jimmy Leonard (FF)	Brendan Toal (FG)	John Conlan (FG)
21st	1977	Constituency abolished. See Cavan–Monaghan		
