= 1973 Monaghan by-election =

By-election to the 20th Dáil

- 27 November 1973
- Turnout: 30,719 (77.5%)
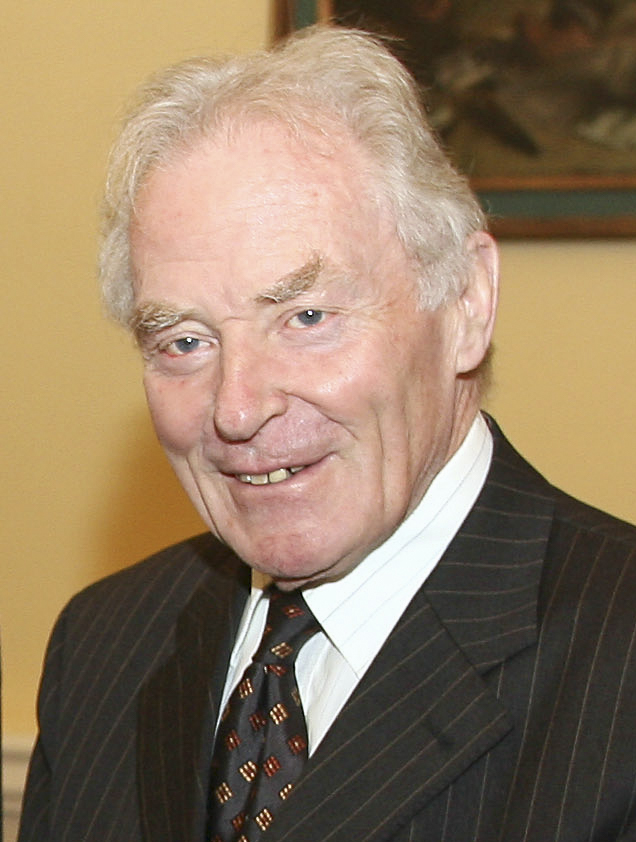

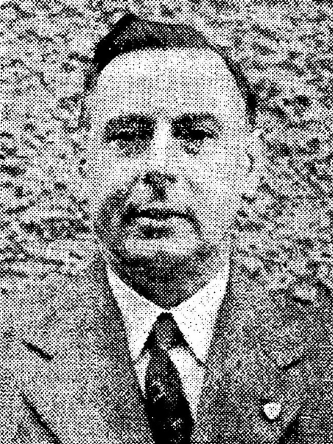
| | Toal |
| Nominee | Brendan Toal | Rory O'Hanlon | Patrick Mooney |
| Party | Fine Gael | Fianna Fáil | Aontacht Éireann |
| First preferences | 14,535 | 13,822 | 5,363 |
| Percentage | 47.3% | 45.0% | 7.1% |
| Final count | 15,080 | 14,791 | – |
TD before election
Erskine H. Childers
Fianna Fáil
TD after election
Brendan Toal
Fine Gael

A Dáil by-election was held in the constituency of Monaghan in Ireland on Tuesday, 27 November 1973, to fill a vacancy in the 20th Dáil. It followed the election of Fianna Fáil Teachta Dála (TD) Erskine H. Childers as president of Ireland on 30 May 1973.

Under Article 12.6.2° of the Constitution of Ireland, a member of either House of the Oireachtas who is elected as president is deemed to have vacated that seat.

The writ of election to fill the vacancy was agreed by the Dáil on 6 November 1973.

The by-election was won by the Fine Gael candidate Brendan Toal.

At the 1977 general election, Toal stood in the new Cavan–Monaghan constituency but was not elected, and was never subsequently re-elected to the Dáil. Rory O'Hanlon, who narrowly lost to Toal in 1973, was among those elected in 1977, serving until the 2011 general election.

== Result ==
1973 Monaghan by-election
| Party | Candidate | FPv% | Count | | |
| Party | Candidate | FPv% | 1 | 2 | 3 |
|---|---|---|---|---|---|
| Fine Gael | Brendan Toal | 47.3 | 14,535 | 14,577 | 15,080 |
| Fianna Fáil | Rory O'Hanlon | 45.0 | 13,822 | 13,851 | 14,791 |
| Aontacht Éireann | Patrick Mooney | 7.1 | 2,187 | 2,248 | |
| Marxist–Leninist | David Vipond | 0.6 | 175 | | |
Electorate: 39,647 Valid: 30,719 Quota: 15,360 Turnout: 77.5%
