= The Dying of a Last Breed =

Live album by Doug Stanhope
- Released: May 19, 2020
- Recorded: May 14, 2020
- Venue: The Plaza Hotel, Las Vegas, Nevada
- Genre: Comedy
- Length: approximately 82 minutes
- Producer: Light Forge Studios

Doug Stanhope chronology
Popov Vodka Presents: An Evening With Doug Stanhope (2018)	The Dying of a Last Breed (2020)	Discount Meat (2024)

Professional ratings
Review scores
Source	Rating
Chortle	4/5 stars

The Dying of a Last Breed is the eleventh stand-up comedy album by American comedian Doug Stanhope. It was filmed and recorded live at the Plaza Hotel in Las Vegas, and became available on May 19, 2020, through Vimeo. As of April 2025, the special is available on YouTube under the Bill Burr's podcast / production network All Things Comedy.

== Track listing ==
(adapted from Apple Music)

No.	Title	Length
1.	"Sorry"	1:50
2.	"Dead Kids"	13:42
3.	"Hotel, Motel, Holiday Inn"	9:49
4.	"Gay Cousin Eric"	5:00
5.	"Tell Us How We Did"	2:33
6.	"Indian Gang Rape"	12:10
7.	"#MeTooing Myself"	10:46
8.	"What Are You Looking At, Faggot? (Weak Dude)"	2:07
9.	"Indianapolis Barber Shop"	8:57
10.	"Old People Disgust Me"	5:07
11.	"Making Fun / Laura Kimball"	7:19
