= No Place Like Home (Doug Stanhope album) =

Live album by Doug Stanhope
- Released: November 18, 2016
- Recorded: 2016
- Venue: Bisbee, Arizona
- Genre: Comedy
- Length: 1:10:25
- Label: Comedy Dynamics
- Producer: Brian Hennigan (also exec.); Christi Dembrowski (exec.); Johnny Depp (exec.); Sam Sarkar (exec.); Brian Volk-Weiss (exec.)

Doug Stanhope chronology
Beer Hall Putsch (2013)	No Place Like Home (2016)	Popov Vodka Presents: An Evening With Doug Stanhope (2018)

No Place Like Home is the tenth stand-up comedy album by American comedian Doug Stanhope. It was recorded live in Bisbee, Arizona and released on November 18, 2016, via Comedy Dynamics. The album peaked at #1 on the US Billboard Comedy Albums chart.

== Track listing ==
No.	Title	Length
1.	"1st World Poverty"	2:40
2.	"Locked Up Abroad"	3:51
3.	"Hey ISIS, Get Off of My Lawn"	2:05
4.	"Imagine the Beheading"	4:58
5.	"Mentally Ill vs. Mentally Challenged"	3:32
6.	"Free Range Crazies"	2:02
7.	"18 Years a Slave"	4:27
8.	"The Euphemism Treadmill"	3:17
9.	"What's Your Label?"	1:44
10.	"Instant Karma"	3:16
11.	"And You Wonder Why"	2:14
12.	"TMZ Is America's Bowel Cancer"	2:47
13.	"All Apologies"	2:50
14.	"The Late Robin Williams"	1:35
15.	"Queer Showers"	4:39
16.	"Born a Woman"	3:39
17.	"Work Around the Hernia"	2:05
18.	"Pukers"	2:05
19.	"Cancer Vanity"	4:25
20.	"Jager Toes"	1:44
21.	"Vietnam Hats/Nightmares"	3:58
22.	"We've Always Been Wrong"	2:14
23.	"Kick Like You Kick"	4:18
Total length:		1:10:25

== Chart history ==
Chart (2016)	Peak position
US Top Comedy Albums (Billboard)	1
