= Monaghan (Dáil constituency) =

Dáil constituency (1921–1977)

- Former Dáil constituency

Former constituency
- Created: 1921
- Abolished: 1977
- Seats: 3
- Local government area: County Monaghan
- Created from: North Monaghan; South Monaghan
- Replaced by: Cavan–Monaghan

Monaghan was a parliamentary constituency represented in Dáil Éireann, the lower house of the Irish parliament or Oireachtas from 1921 to 1977. The constituency elected 3 deputies (Teachtaí Dála, commonly known as TDs) to the Dáil, on the system of proportional representation by means of the single transferable vote (PR-STV).

== History ==
The constituency was created in 1921 as a 3-seat constituency, under the Government of Ireland Act 1920, for the 1921 election to the House of Commons of Southern Ireland, whose members formed the Second Dáil.

It succeeded the constituencies of North Monaghan and South Monaghan which were used to elect the Members of the 1st Dáil and earlier British House of Commons members.

It was abolished under the Electoral (Amendment) Act 1974, when it was replaced by the new constituency of Cavan–Monaghan which was first used at the 1977 general election.

== Boundaries ==
The constituency spanned the entire area of the County Monaghan.

== TDs ==
Teachtaí Dála (TDs) for Monaghan 1921–1977
Key to parties: CnaG = Cumann na nGaedheal; FF = Fianna Fáil; FG = Fine Gael; Ind. = Independent; Rep = Republican; SF = Sinn Féin; AT-SF = Sinn Féin (Anti-Treaty); PT-SF = Sinn Féin (Pro-Treaty)
Dáil	Election	Deputy (Party)	Deputy (Party)	Deputy (Party)
2nd	1921	Seán MacEntee (SF)	Eoin O'Duffy (SF)	Ernest Blythe (SF)
3rd	1922	Patrick MacCarvill (AT-SF)	Eoin O'Duffy (PT-SF)	Ernest Blythe (PT-SF)
4th	1923	Patrick MacCarvill (Rep)	Patrick Duffy (CnaG)	Ernest Blythe (CnaG)
5th	1927 (Jun)	Patrick MacCarvill (FF)	Alexander Haslett (Ind.)	Ernest Blythe (CnaG)
6th	1927 (Sep)	Conn Ward (FF)	Alexander Haslett (Ind.)	Ernest Blythe (CnaG)
7th	1932	Conn Ward (FF)	Eamon Rice (FF)	Ernest Blythe (CnaG)
8th	1933	Conn Ward (FF)	Eamon Rice (FF)	Alexander Haslett (Ind.)
9th	1937	Conn Ward (FF)	Eamon Rice (FF)	James Dillon (FG)
10th	1938	Conn Ward (FF)	Bridget Rice (FF)	James Dillon (FG)
11th	1943	Conn Ward (FF)	Bridget Rice (FF)	James Dillon (Ind.)
12th	1944	Conn Ward (FF)	Bridget Rice (FF)	James Dillon (Ind.)
13th	1948	Patrick Maguire (FF)	Bridget Rice (FF)	James Dillon (Ind.)
14th	1951	Patrick Maguire (FF)	Bridget Rice (FF)	James Dillon (Ind.)
15th	1954	Patrick Mooney (FF)	Edward Kelly (FF)	James Dillon (FG)
16th	1957	Patrick Mooney (FF)	Eighneachán Ó hAnnluain (SF)	James Dillon (FG)
17th	1961	Patrick Mooney (FF)	Erskine H. Childers (FF)	James Dillon (FG)
18th	1965	Patrick Mooney (FF)	Erskine H. Childers (FF)	James Dillon (FG)
19th	1969	Billy Fox (FG)	Erskine H. Childers (FF)	John Conlan (FG)
20th	1973	Jimmy Leonard (FF)	Erskine H. Childers (FF)	John Conlan (FG)
20th	1973 by-election	Jimmy Leonard (FF)	Brendan Toal (FG)	John Conlan (FG)
21st	1977	Constituency abolished. See Cavan–Monaghan		

Note: The columns in this table are used only for presentational purposes, and no significance should be attached to the order of columns. For details of the order in which seats were won at each election, see the detailed results of that election.

== Elections ==
*: Outgoing TD

=== 1973 by-election ===
Following the election of Fianna Fáil TD Erskine H. Childers as President of Ireland, a by-election was held on 27 November 1973. The seat was won by the Fine Gael candidate Brendan Toal.

1973 by-election: Monaghan
Party	Candidate	FPv%	Count		
Party	Candidate	FPv%	1	2	3
Fine Gael	Brendan Toal	47.3	14,535	14,577	15,080
Fianna Fáil	Rory O'Hanlon	45.0	13,822	13,851	14,791
Aontacht Éireann	Patrick Mooney	7.1	2,187	2,248	
Marxist–Leninist	David Vipond	0.6	175		
Electorate: 39,647 Valid: 30,719 Quota: 15,360 Turnout: 77.5%

=== 1973 general election ===
1973 general election: Monaghan
Party	Candidate	FPv%	Count					
Party	Candidate	FPv%	1	2	3	4	5	6
Fianna Fáil	Erskine H. Childers	30.2	8,431					
Fine Gael	John Conlan	21.8	6,075	6,162	6,217	6,589	7,241	
Fine Gael	Billy Fox	13.0	3,632	3,683	3,756	4,021	5,193	5,624
Fianna Fáil	Jimmy Leonard	12.4	3,460	4,648	4,679	4,825	4,889	6,344
Independent	Patrick Mooney	7.6	2,105	2,182	2,200	2,882	2,984	
Fine Gael	Bernard Markey	6.8	1,890	1,911	2,114	2,242		
Independent	Patrick Turley	6.6	1,827	1,849	1,903			
Independent	Val Kerr	1.7	461	475				
Electorate: 36,214 Valid: 27,881 Quota: 6,971 Turnout: 76.9%

=== 1969 general election ===
1969 general election: Monaghan
Party	Candidate	FPv%	Count					
Party	Candidate	FPv%	1	2	3	4	5	6
Fine Gael	John Conlan	23.2	6,615	6,683	6,851	6,873	7,526	
Fianna Fáil	Patrick Mooney	20.7	5,921	5,985	6,072	6,451	6,561	6,568
Fianna Fáil	Erskine H. Childers	19.8	5,659	5,689	5,771	6,714	6,877	6,885
Fine Gael	Billy Fox	17.3	4,930	5,006	5,137	5,162	6,741	7,110
Fine Gael	Bernard Markey	8.5	2,443	2,476	2,692	2,906		
Fianna Fáil	James Malone	5.4	1,536	1,558	1,677			
Labour	Thomas Donoghue	2.7	761	1,133				
Labour	Charles McCollum	2.4	699					
Electorate: 35,614 Valid: 28,564 Quota: 7,142 Turnout: 80.2%

=== 1965 general election ===
1965 general election: Monaghan
Party	Candidate	FPv%	Count			
Party	Candidate	FPv%	1	2	3	4
Fine Gael	James Dillon	30.5	7,668			
Fianna Fáil	Erskine H. Childers	25.7	6,448			
Fianna Fáil	Patrick Mooney	23.9	5,997	6,065	6,182	6,334
Fine Gael	Billy Fox	15.5	3,901	5,020	6,086	6,099
Fine Gael	Martin Tierney	4.4	1,114	1,312		
Electorate: 32,533 Valid: 25,128 Quota: 6,283 Turnout: 77.2%

=== 1961 general election ===
1961 general election: Monaghan
Party	Candidate	FPv%	Count			
Party	Candidate	FPv%	1	2	3	4
Fine Gael	James Dillon	30.8	7,887			
Fianna Fáil	Patrick Mooney	22.3	5,713	5,782	6,112	7,447
Fianna Fáil	Erskine H. Childers	22.0	5,643	5,702	5,798	6,519
Independent	Francis Ward	10.5	2,678	2,734	3,054	
Fine Gael	Edward Kelly	7.5	1,912	3,174	3,435	3,694
Sinn Féin	Séamus McElwaine	7.0	1,786	1,822		
Electorate: 32,967 Valid: 25,619 Quota: 6,405 Turnout: 77.7%

=== 1957 general election ===
1957 general election: Monaghan
Party	Candidate	FPv%	Count					
Party	Candidate	FPv%	1	2	3	4	5	6
Fine Gael	James Dillon	23.3	5,894	6,108	6,275	7,081		
Sinn Féin	Eighneachán Ó hAnnluain	18.9	4,791	4,806	5,027	5,037	5,041	5,044
Fianna Fáil	Patrick Mooney	18.6	4,719	4,747	6,114	6,901		
Independent	Robert Houston	14.2	3,594	3,699	3,742			
Fianna Fáil	John Brennan	12.4	3,132	3,145	4,067	4,395	4,510	4,753
Fianna Fáil	Edward Kelly	11.0	2,788	2,813				
Fine Gael	Herbert McWilliam	1.7	425					
Electorate: 31,622 Valid: 25,343 Quota: 6,336 Turnout: 80.1%

=== 1954 general election ===
1954 general election: Monaghan
Party	Candidate	FPv%	Count				
Party	Candidate	FPv%	1	2	3	4	5
Fine Gael	James Dillon	24.2	6,709	7,598			
Fianna Fáil	Patrick Mooney	18.5	5,122	5,166	5,553	5,600	6,956
Independent	James Haslett	16.9	4,685	4,713	4,974	5,189	5,304
Fianna Fáil	Edward Kelly	13.3	3,695	3,738	4,227	4,310	6,407
Fianna Fáil	John Brennan	13.1	3,625	3,648	3,868	3,904	
Clann na Poblachta	Brian Magee	9.8	2,705	2,825			
Fine Gael	John Fitzpatrick	4.2	1,171				
Electorate: 32,700 Valid: 27,712 Quota: 6,929 Turnout: 84.8%

=== 1951 general election ===
1951 general election: Monaghan
Party	Candidate	FPv%	Count	
Party	Candidate	FPv%	1	2
Independent	James Dillon	33.1	9,285	
Fianna Fáil	Patrick Maguire	24.3	6,802	7,278
Fianna Fáil	Bridget Rice	24.3	6,802	7,403
Independent	James Haslett	18.3	5,127	6,330
Electorate: 33,647 Valid: 28,016 Quota: 7,005 Turnout: 83.3%

=== 1948 general election ===
1948 general election: Monaghan
Party	Candidate	FPv%	Count						
Party	Candidate	FPv%	1	2	3	4	5	6	7
Independent	James Dillon	23.1	6,621	6,783	6,978	7,433			
Fianna Fáil	Patrick Maguire	16.9	4,828	4,907	4,949	5,173	5,198	5,970	6,447
Fianna Fáil	Bridget Rice	16.3	4,667	4,737	4,829	5,036	5,066	6,324	6,936
Independent	Arthur H. Montgomery	14.7	4,200	4,377	4,379	4,454	4,484	4,503	4,677
Clann na Poblachta	Patrick MacCarvill	8.2	2,348	2,507	3,406	3,729	3,844	3,981	
Fianna Fáil	John J. Brennan	7.8	2,235	2,303	2,314	2,360	2,372		
Clann na Talmhan	Patrick Mooney	4.8	1,361	1,659	1,689				
Clann na Poblachta	Thomas Caraher	4.4	1,253	1,308					
Labour	George Pollock	2.0	582						
Clann na Talmhan	Edward Bell	1.8	517						
Electorate: 34,581 Valid: 28,612 Quota: 7,154 Turnout: 82.7%

=== 1944 general election ===
1944 general election: Monaghan
Party	Candidate	FPv%	Count
Party	Candidate	FPv%	1
Independent	James Dillon	31.9	8,416
Fianna Fáil	Conn Ward	31.4	8,308
Fianna Fáil	Bridget Rice	25.7	6,791
Clann na Talmhan	Patrick McArdle	11.0	2,911
Electorate: 35,476 Valid: 26,426 Quota: 6,607 Turnout: 74.5%

=== 1943 general election ===
1943 general election: Monaghan
Party	Candidate	FPv%	Count			
Party	Candidate	FPv%	1	2	3	4
Fianna Fáil	Conn Ward	25.2	7,434			
Fianna Fáil	Bridget Rice	18.4	5,424	5,581	6,373	7,501
Independent	James Dillon	18.3	5,406	5,761	6,404	8,248
Independent	Alexander Haslett	17.2	5,078	5,087	5,172	5,325
Clann na Talmhan	Patrick McArdle	10.8	3,181	3,368	3,808	
Labour	Michael Linehan	7.4	2,174	2,258		
Fine Gael	Patrick Lonergan	2.8	824			
Electorate: 35,476 Valid: 29,521 Quota: 7,381 Turnout: 83.2%

=== 1938 general election ===
1938 general election: Monaghan
Party	Candidate	FPv%	Count	
Party	Candidate	FPv%	1	2
Fianna Fáil	Conn Ward	29.7	9,458	
Fine Gael	James Dillon	29.3	9,318	
Fianna Fáil	Bridget Rice	22.2	7,075	8,553
Independent	John Gillespie	18.8	5,984	6,005
Electorate: 35,949 Valid: 31,835 Quota: 7,959 Turnout: 88.6%

=== 1937 general election ===
1937 general election: Monaghan
Party	Candidate	FPv%	Count			
Party	Candidate	FPv%	1	2	3	4
Fianna Fáil	Conn Ward	39.2	12,275			
Fine Gael	James Dillon	24.4	7,653	7,700	7,829	
Independent	Alexander Haslett	20.2	6,314	6,325	6,336	6,347
Fianna Fáil	Eamon Rice	10.3	3,219	7,499	7,737	8,261
Fine Gael	Brian O'Rourke	2.5	782	798	825	859
Fianna Fáil	James Johnston	1.7	538	606	680	
Independent	John McGahey	1.7	524	550		
Electorate: 36,469 Valid: 31,305 Quota: 7,827 Turnout: 85.8%

=== 1933 general election ===
1933 general election: Monaghan
Party	Candidate	FPv%	Count		
Party	Candidate	FPv%	1	2	3
Fianna Fáil	Eamon Rice	27.8	8,749		
Fianna Fáil	Conn Ward	26.2	8,244		
Cumann na nGaedheal	Ernest Blythe	23.0	7,251	7,435	7,563
Independent	Alexander Haslett	23.0	7,238	7,752	7,997
Electorate: 36,784 Valid: 31,482 Quota: 7,871 Turnout: 85.6%

=== 1932 general election ===
1932 general election: Monaghan
Party	Candidate	FPv%	Count		
Party	Candidate	FPv%	1	2	3
Fianna Fáil	Conn Ward	32.7	10,048		
Cumann na nGaedheal	Ernest Blythe	24.5	7,524	7,564	8,490
Independent	Alexander Haslett	21.4	6,573	6,585	6,656
Fianna Fáil	Eamon Rice	17.4	5,360	7,654	7,777
Cumann na nGaedheal	Edward Brady	4.0	1,225	1,244	
Electorate: 36,547 Valid: 30,730 Quota: 7,683 Turnout: 84.1%

=== September 1927 general election ===
September 1927 general election: Monaghan
Party	Candidate	FPv%	Count		
Party	Candidate	FPv%	1	2	3
Cumann na nGaedheal	Ernest Blythe	24.5	7,171	8,936	
Independent	Alexander Haslett	23.4	6,843	6,918	7,157
Fianna Fáil	Conn Ward	22.1	6,467	6,829	6,995
Fianna Fáil	Eamon Donnelly	20.7	6,059	6,347	6,468
Cumann na nGaedheal	Patrick Duffy	9.3	2,708		
Electorate: 39,069 Valid: 29,248 Quota: 7,313 Turnout: 74.9%

=== June 1927 general election ===
June 1927 general election: Monaghan
Party	Candidate	FPv%	Count					
Party	Candidate	FPv%	1	2	3	4	5	6
Independent	Alexander Haslett	22.6	6,964	7,012	7,101	7,172	7,189	7,236
Fianna Fáil	Patrick MacCarvill	19.1	5,904	6,054	6,511	6,868	10,163	
Cumann na nGaedheal	Ernest Blythe	17.9	5,532	5,692	5,832	7,519	7,566	7,630
National League	Jeremiah McVeagh	14.1	4,338	4,474	4,847	5,132	5,415	6,859
Fianna Fáil	Conn Ward	11.5	3,559	3,642	3,702	3,750		
Cumann na nGaedheal	Patrick Duffy	7.9	2,438	2,483	2,686			
Clann Éireann	Patrick Conlan	4.5	1,399	1,454				
Independent	Edward Brady	2.4	729					
Electorate: 39,069 Valid: 30,863 Quota: 7,716 Turnout: 79.0%

=== 1923 general election ===
1923 general election: Monaghan
Party	Candidate	FPv%	Count				
Party	Candidate	FPv%	1	2	3	4	5
Cumann na nGaedheal	Ernest Blythe	44.1	11,290				
Republican	Patrick MacCarvill	22.4	5,745	5,808	6,085	6,276	7,303
Farmers' Party	Hugh Maguire	11.5	2,937	3,573	3,654	3,955	4,420
Independent	James Coburn	11.0	2,806	3,158	3,217	3,445	
Cumann na nGaedheal	Patrick Duffy	5.1	1,316	5,030	5,111	5,302	6,506
Independent	James Barnes	3.5	888	932	1,112		
Independent	James Johnston	2.4	625	704			
Electorate: 40,172 Valid: 25,607 Quota: 6,402 Turnout: 63.7%

=== 1922 general election ===
1922 general election: Monaghan
Party	Candidate	FPv%	Count	
Party	Candidate	FPv%	1	2
Sinn Féin (Pro-Treaty)	Eoin O'Duffy	35.6	7,298	
Sinn Féin (Anti-Treaty)	Patrick MacCarvill	24.6	5,046	5,249
Sinn Féin (Pro-Treaty)	Ernest Blythe	21.9	4,494	6,069
Independent	Thomas McHugh	17.9	3,681	4,071
Electorate: 34,025 Valid: 20,519 Quota: 5,130 Turnout: 60.3%

=== 1921 general election ===
1921 general election: Monaghan (uncontested)
Party	Candidate
Sinn Féin	Ernest Blythe
Sinn Féin	Seán MacEntee
Sinn Féin	Eoin O'Duffy

== See also ==
- Dáil constituencies
- Politics of the Republic of Ireland
- Historic Dáil constituencies
- Elections in the Republic of Ireland
