= Billy Fox (politician) =

Irish politician (1939–1974)

- Fox, c. 1970s

Senator
- In office 1 June 1973 – 12 March 1974
- Constituency: Cultural and Educational Panel

Teachta Dála
- In office June 1969 – February 1973
- Constituency: Monaghan

Personal details
- Born: William Fox; 3 January 1939 Cortubber, Castleblayney, County Monaghan, Ireland
- Died: 12 March 1974 (aged 35) Clones, County Monaghan, Ireland
- Cause of death: Assassination by gunshot
- Party: Fine Gael

Billy Fox (3 January 1939 – 12 March 1974) was an Irish Fine Gael politician who served as a Senator for the Cultural and Educational Panel from 1973 until his death in 1974, having earlier served as a TD for the Monaghan constituency from 1969 to 1973. He was shot dead on the night of 11 March 1974 by a raiding party of the Provisional IRA at the home of his girlfriend's family at Tircooney, near Clones, County Monaghan; his body was found the following morning. Five members of the organisation were later convicted of his murder. He remains the only member of the Oireachtas to have been killed during the Troubles.

== Early life ==
Billy Fox was born in January 1939 in Cortubber, Castleblayney, County Monaghan, the only son of William Fox and his wife, Helen. He was educated at the local national school and at Victor Weymount grammar school in Carrickmacross, after which he worked as a farmer at Bawn, near the Cavan-Monaghan county boundary. He was an only child, from a Protestant farming background typical of that part of Monaghan.

Among the Bawn neighbours who grew up alongside Fox and who later recalled him fondly were Peadar McElroy, Pat Ruxton and Tommy McKeon, who remembered him as a trustworthy friend and something of a practical joker. Fox became involved with the National Farmers' Association, serving as county secretary for the organisation in Monaghan, and was also a member of the select vestry of the Church of Ireland and of the diocesan synod. He was well liked among farmers in the county, and was described by Ruxton as a man who "didn't enforce politics on anyone" and who worked for peace in the area. He was active in the Fine Gael youth movement during the 1960s, belonged to the liberal wing of the party, and was sympathetic to Irish republicanism.

== Political career ==
Fox was first elected to Monaghan County Council in 1967. He was elected in 1969 to the 19th Dáil as a Fine Gael TD for the Monaghan constituency, alongside John Francis Conlan, who took the seat vacated by James Dillon; this was the only occasion on which Fine Gael secured the election of two members for the three-seat Monaghan constituency. Fox was one of a small number of members of the Oireachtas from the minority Protestant community.

His election was assisted by support from the County Monaghan Protestant Association, a grouping founded in the 1920s for former unionists which had continuous representation on the county council and other local bodies. Fox, however, made no secret of his republican sympathies, stating in 1969 that he regretted what he described as an insular mentality among many Monaghan Protestants. His view that religion was irrelevant in political terms was not shared by all; in 1970 the Fianna Fáil ministers Kevin Boland and Brian Lenihan were forced to apologise after describing him as a B-Special.

Although Fox rarely spoke in the Dáil and Seanad, he attracted attention by criticising the British Army's use of plastic and rubber bullets for crowd control and its cratering of unapproved roads along the border, a tactic he was alleged to have undone on occasion by filling in some of the craters himself. On 9 December 1971, during a Dáil debate, he displayed two rubber bullets and a CS gas canister which he claimed had been fired across the border by British forces. He was forcibly removed from the Dáil chamber, and the incident made front-page news, attracting national publicity. The episode was later said to have played a significant part in the loss of his Dáil seat two years afterwards.

Fox also criticised Ian Paisley after it was announced that a Free Presbyterian congregation was to be established in Drum, County Monaghan, and was reported to have discussed a federal Ireland proposal with the Sinn Féin vice-president Dáithí Ó Conaill.

Fox lost his Dáil seat at the 1973 Irish general election by 235 votes. It was claimed that his defeat owed something to Protestant voters unhappy with his republican sympathies, though some Fianna Fáil supporters were also said to have run a slur campaign linking him to the B-Specials. He was subsequently elected to the 13th Seanad from the educational and cultural panel later that year.

== Relationship with Marjorie Coulson ==
Fox had been going out with Marjorie Coulson, a matron at a hospital in Belfast, for some years. The couple had met in the late 1960s at a dance in Newbliss, County Monaghan, and came from neighbouring Protestant families. There was said to be an understanding between them that they would eventually marry, and Marjorie Coulson supported Fox's political career throughout his time as a TD and Senator. Fox visited the Coulson family home at Tircooney, near Clones, every Monday evening, the one night Marjorie Coulson had off from her hospital work.

== Assassination ==
On the night of Monday 11 March 1974, a raiding party of the Provisional IRA arrived at the Coulson family home at Tircooney, near Clones, close to the border with Northern Ireland. Sources differ slightly on the size of the party, describing a raid by around a dozen men, or as many as thirteen.

According to an account later given by one of those convicted, Sean Kinsella, the raid had its roots in an attack the previous November on the McCooey family home at Legnakelly, near Clones, in which a republican activist staying there, Noel Thornbury, was shot and wounded by loyalist gunmen who had crossed the border from County Fermanagh. IRA members in the area already suspected that loyalist paramilitaries were receiving local assistance. In March 1974, men from north of the border, described by Kinsella as "Northmen", approached him claiming to have information that the UVF had used the Coulson farm to store weapons and had assisted in the earlier attack. Kinsella assembled a local unit of four men from the Clones area, including his younger brother Michael, to support a raid on the Coulson home.

The raiders searched the farmhouse and demanded that its occupants, George Coulson, his wife, and their children Robert and Marjorie, hand over weapons. No arms were found, the allegation against the family being without foundation. During the search, one of the raiders took the family Bible and threw it on the fire, a gesture with a long history as an anti-Protestant sectarian act.

As the raid was under way, Fox arrived by car for his usual Monday visit. He was stopped by armed raiders outside the house, ran towards it, and was fired upon. Accounts of his wounds vary: some sources state he was shot twice, others that he was shot three times after being chased across fields, and another describes a single gunshot wound to the upper torso. A contemporary account described a gunshot wound to the chest with an exit wound in the back, along with a further wound across the toes of his left foot. He died in a field near the house, and his body was not found until the following morning. An RTÉ News report filed the following day by Barry Linnane showed the scene at Tircooney and the smouldering remains of the farmhouse.

The raiders ordered the Coulson family out of the house before setting fire to it, and to a mobile home on the property, and then fled.

It was later alleged that a local family with a grudge against the Coulsons had falsely told the IRA that UVF arms were being stored at the farmhouse, and that Fox's unexpected arrival caused the raiders to panic. Other commentators felt this explanation understated the extent of sectarian hatred involved in the attack. Some believed Fox had been deliberately targeted, since it was known locally that he visited the farm every Monday, the night Marjorie Coulson was off work and visiting her family. Marjorie Coulson herself later said she believed the attack was a deliberate, sectarian act, and suggested that Fox's friendship with the Minister for Justice, Paddy Cooney, who had pursued a hard line against the Provisional IRA, may have been a motive. She rejected suggestions that her brother, George Coulson, had been a UVF quartermaster, saying the wider community knew the family had no involvement with any paramilitary organisation.

== Immediate aftermath ==
The following day, the Ulster Freedom Fighters claimed responsibility for Fox's killing, stating he had links to the Provisional IRA. This claim is now understood to have been invented to distract from the fact that the killing had been carried out by the Provisional IRA. The IRA itself issued a statement denying involvement, describing Fox as known personally to a number of the leadership of the republican movement.

The killing of a member of the Oireachtas in what was widely seen as a sectarian attack caused outrage across the state. The Seanad adjourned for a week as a mark of respect. More than 2,500 people attended Fox's funeral at Aughnamullen, including President Erskine Childers and the Taoiseach, Liam Cosgrave. As Fox had no siblings and both his parents had died, Marjorie Coulson was chief mourner.

Fox's death reinforced fears, widely shared in official circles in Dublin during the early and mid-1970s, that the conflict in Northern Ireland might destabilise the Republic. John Bruton, who shared an office in Leinster House with Fox and later served as Taoiseach between 1994 and 1997, said his own views on the Northern conflict were permanently affected by the murder, and that he remained angry about it decades afterwards.

== Investigation, trial and imprisonment ==
By St Patrick's Day, gardaí had charged five men from the Clones area with Fox's murder and IRA membership: brothers Sean and Michael Kinsella, Sean McGettigan, James ("Junior") McPhillips, and George McDermott. None of the "Northmen" who had directed the raid were arrested.

At the same time, local IRA supporters engaged in a whispering campaign, falsely alleging that Fox had himself been involved in UVF activities, and that the Monaghan town bombing of 17 May 1974, which occurred while the trial was under way, had been a revenge attack for his death carried out by named Monaghan Protestants. It later became known that the Monaghan bombing had in fact been carried out by loyalists from Portadown, County Armagh. The unfounded allegations linking Fox's death to the bombing were nonetheless published in Micheál Ó Cuinneagáin's book Monaghan: County of Intrigue (1979).

The trial lasted fourteen days, and there was said to be little doubt as to its outcome. All five men were convicted of murder on 6 June 1974 and sentenced to penal servitude for life. In an unsworn statement to the court, whose authenticity was questioned by some republicans, Sean Kinsella said the men had raided the Coulson home believing a UVF arms dump was stored there, and that there had been a clear understanding that no shots were to be fired. He said the raiders had regretted Fox's death, that Fox had taken some of them by surprise in the dark, and suggested he had been shot by a man from north of the border who did not recognise him.

The trial of Fox's killers, coming so soon after the Monaghan bombing, meant the events at Tircooney were subsequently overshadowed by other events of that turbulent period.

On 18 August 1974, nineteen republican prisoners, including the Kinsella brothers, escaped from Portlaoise Prison after overpowering warders and blasting through two gates with gelignite. Michael Kinsella remained at large for around eighteen months before being recaptured in County Leitrim and returned to Portlaoise. Sean Kinsella fled to England, where he remained an active member of the Provisional IRA; in 1975 he was involved in a shootout with police in Liverpool in which two officers were wounded, for which he received three further life sentences and was held in Wormwood Scrubs. He was later released under the terms of the Good Friday Agreement.

All five men convicted of Fox's murder were freed in 1990, after sixteen years in prison, following a campaign supported by Cardinal Tomás Ó Fiaich and Clones Urban District Council to have a release date set.

== Legacy and commemoration ==
Author Tim Pat Coogan has suggested that members of the Official IRA, rather than the Provisionals, may have been responsible for Fox's killing. Because Fox was a Protestant, some Fine Gael politicians have since stated that the motive for his killing was sectarian.

The circumstances of Fox's death were later explored in the RTÉ Radio 1 documentary Rumours from Monaghan, compiled and presented by Peter Woods and Seán Rocks and produced by Woods, which examined the events at Tircooney and the atmosphere of fear and paranoia felt by people living along the border during that period.

A year after Fox's death, Marjorie Coulson met and married George Beattie, then a printer based in Belfast, who later trained as a Church of Ireland minister as a late vocation in 2004; she subsequently went by her married name, Marjorie Beattie. The couple regularly attended memorial events at the Senator Billy Fox Memorial Park in Latton, County Monaghan, named in his honour, as is the Cavan-Monaghan branch of Young Fine Gael. George Beattie died in February 2024, shortly before the fiftieth anniversary of Fox's death.

On the fiftieth anniversary, a memorial service was held on 28 April 2024 at Christ Church, Aughnamullen, where Fox is buried, organised in part by the Latton Bawn Historical Society, along with a wreath-laying ceremony; the group has also proposed an interpretive centre at the church.

In July 2024, a portrait of Senator Fox by the artist Nina Rumińska, commissioned by the Office of Public Works, was unveiled at an event in Leinster House by the Cathaoirleach of Seanad Éireann, Jerry Buttimer, and Taoiseach Simon Harris, attended by members of the Fox family and by serving and former members of the Oireachtas. Buttimer described Fox as a courageous politician and a man who had worked with vigour, imagination and empathy for the good of his community.

Dáil	Election	Deputy (Party)	Deputy (Party)	Deputy (Party)
2nd	1921	Seán MacEntee (SF)	Eoin O'Duffy (SF)	Ernest Blythe (SF)
3rd	1922	Patrick MacCarvill (AT-SF)	Eoin O'Duffy (PT-SF)	Ernest Blythe (PT-SF)
4th	1923	Patrick MacCarvill (Rep)	Patrick Duffy (CnaG)	Ernest Blythe (CnaG)
5th	1927 (Jun)	Patrick MacCarvill (FF)	Alexander Haslett (Ind.)	Ernest Blythe (CnaG)
6th	1927 (Sep)	Conn Ward (FF)	Alexander Haslett (Ind.)	Ernest Blythe (CnaG)
7th	1932	Conn Ward (FF)	Eamon Rice (FF)	Ernest Blythe (CnaG)
8th	1933	Conn Ward (FF)	Eamon Rice (FF)	Alexander Haslett (Ind.)
9th	1937	Conn Ward (FF)	Eamon Rice (FF)	James Dillon (FG)
10th	1938	Conn Ward (FF)	Bridget Rice (FF)	James Dillon (FG)
11th	1943	Conn Ward (FF)	Bridget Rice (FF)	James Dillon (Ind.)
12th	1944	Conn Ward (FF)	Bridget Rice (FF)	James Dillon (Ind.)
13th	1948	Patrick Maguire (FF)	Bridget Rice (FF)	James Dillon (Ind.)
14th	1951	Patrick Maguire (FF)	Bridget Rice (FF)	James Dillon (Ind.)
15th	1954	Patrick Mooney (FF)	Edward Kelly (FF)	James Dillon (FG)
16th	1957	Patrick Mooney (FF)	Eighneachán Ó hAnnluain (SF)	James Dillon (FG)
17th	1961	Patrick Mooney (FF)	Erskine H. Childers (FF)	James Dillon (FG)
18th	1965	Patrick Mooney (FF)	Erskine H. Childers (FF)	James Dillon (FG)
19th	1969	Billy Fox (FG)	Erskine H. Childers (FF)	John Conlan (FG)
20th	1973	Jimmy Leonard (FF)	Erskine H. Childers (FF)	John Conlan (FG)
20th	1973 by-election	Jimmy Leonard (FF)	Brendan Toal (FG)	John Conlan (FG)
21st	1977	Constituency abolished. See Cavan–Monaghan		
