= Andy Andrist =

American stand-up comedian and writer (born 1965)

- Born: Andrew J. Andrist; August 19, 1965 (age 61); Oregon
- Notable work: Writing on The Man Show

Comedy career
- Medium: Stand-up, television
- Genres: Observational humor, Black comedy

Andrew J. Andrist (born August 19, 1965) is an American stand-up comedian and former writer for Comedy Central's The Man Show.

== Stand-up comedy ==
Andrist is one of the original members of Doug Stanhope's comedy group, The Unbookables. Other members of the Unbookables include Sean Rouse, Henry Phillips, Otto & George, Tom Rhodes, Auggie Smith, Lynn Shawcroft, Neil Hamburger, Travis Lipski, Brendon Walsh, Joey Diaz, Kristine Levine, Brett Erickson, and others.

== Discography ==
Title	Year	CD
Dumb It Down for the Masses	2006	x
Morbid Obscenity, The Unbookables	2006	x
Last Shot	2021	x

Both Andrist's debut CD Dumb It Down for the Masses and follow-up benefit CD Morbid Obscenity with fellow Unbookables Doug Stanhope, Sean Rouse, and Lynn Shawcroft was recorded and put out by Dan Schlissel's Stand Up! Records. Last Shot was released in June 2021.

== Television appearances ==
Following the departure of Jimmy Kimmel and Adam Carolla from Comedy Central's The Man Show in 2003, Andrist was hired as a writer and performer alongside comedians Doug Stanhope and Joe Rogan.

In May 2008, Andrist filmed a set for an episode of HBO's Down and Dirty with Jim Norton. The four-part special features young comedians as well as several established headliners, including Artie Lange, Patrice O'Neal, Andrew 'Dice' Clay, Bill Burr, Jim Florentine, Ari Shaffir, and fellow Unbookable Sean Rouse among others.

== Personal life ==
In late 2021, Andrist was diagnosed with bile duct cancer. The news was announced on The Doug Stanhope Podcast "Episode #475 — Andy's Got Cancer". He underwent surgery in January 2022. Results were successful.

Andrist is married to a Jehovah's Witness.
