= Patrick MacCarvill =

Irish politician and medical doctor (1893–1955)

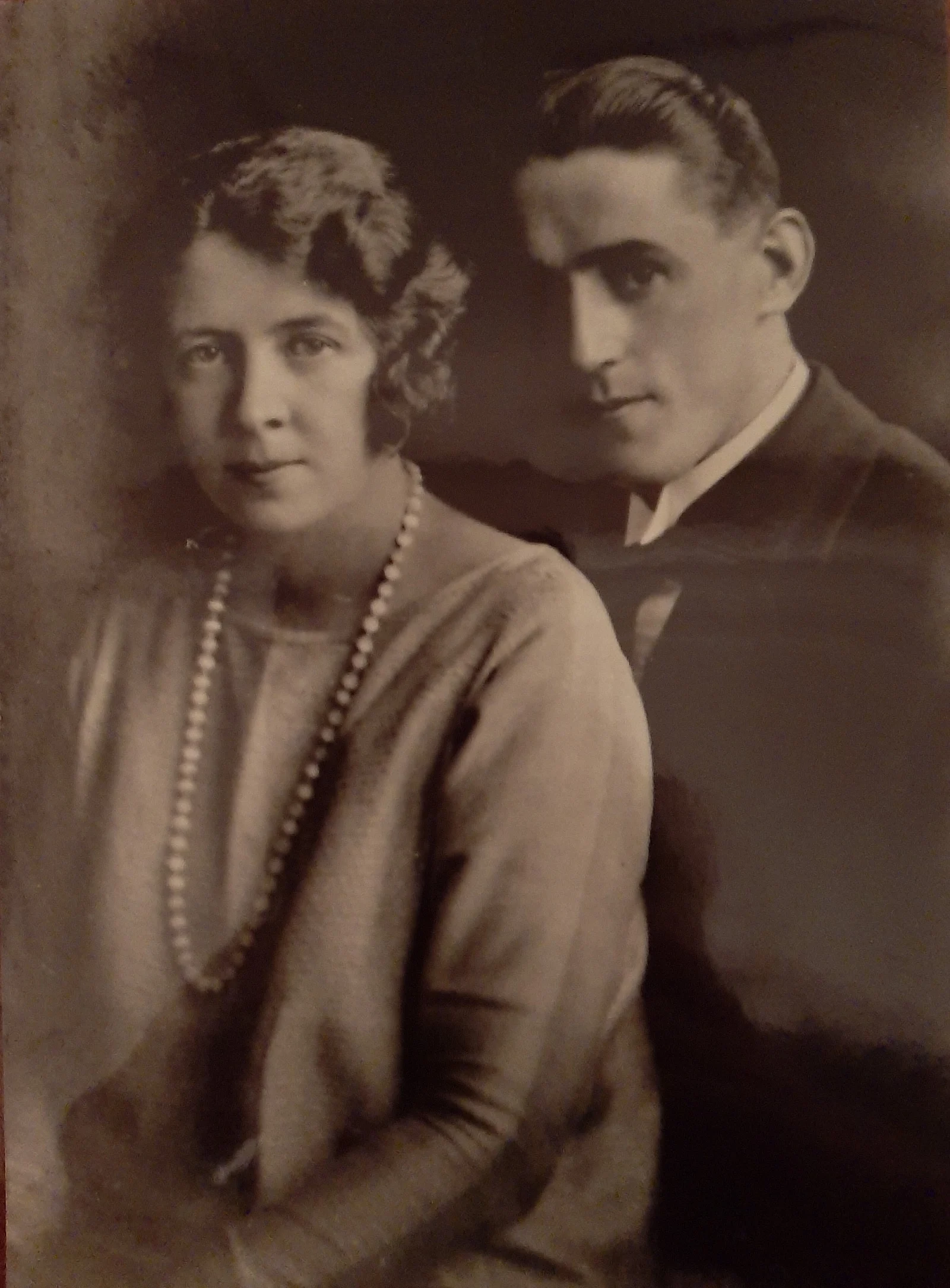
- MacCarvill and his wife Eileen McGrane in 1925

Teachta Dála
- In office June 1922 – September 1927
- Constituency: Monaghan

Personal details
- Born: 23 May 1893 Raw, County Monaghan, Ireland
- Died: 16 March 1955 (aged 61)
- Party: Fianna Fáil
- Other political affiliations: Sinn Féin; Clann na Poblachta
- Spouse: Eileen McGrane
- Children: 5
- Education: University College Dublin

Patrick MacCarvill (23 May 1893 – 16 March 1955) was an Irish politician and medical doctor.

== Biography ==
He was born in Raw, County Monaghan, the son of farmers John McCarvill and Susan Moyna.

He was elected as an anti-Treaty Sinn Féin Teachta Dála (TD) to the 3rd Dáil at the 1922 general election for the Monaghan constituency but did not take his seat because of the absentionist policy of Sinn Féin.

MacCarvill studied at University College Dublin (UCD) and was a medical doctor, as was his son. Prior to being fully qualified MacCarvill helped in training of members of Cumann na mBan after the 1916 Easter Rising, and during the Irish War of Independence in first aid in Harcourt Street, along with Kathleen Lynn and Dr Geraghty. During his time in UCD he played Gaelic football winning the Sigerson Cup medals in 1917 and 1918. He also played soccer which caused him difficulties with the GAA in the College.

His selection as candidate for the 1922 general election was controversial since the anti-Treaty side selected MacCarvill instead of outgoing TD Seán MacEntee. The pro-Treaty side claimed this breached the electoral pact which would have resulted in two pro-Treaty and one anti-Treaty candidates being elected without a contest. As a result of the selection of MacCarvill, the pro-Treaty side stood an independent candidate Thomas McHugh which forced an election. MacCarvill was elected.

He was re-elected at the 1923 general election and once again did not take his seat. He was elected as a Fianna Fáil TD at the June 1927 general election and took his seat on 12 August 1927 along with the other Fianna Fáil TDs. He did not contest the September 1927 general election, being succeeded as Fianna Fáil TD by Conn Ward.

=== Conn Ward controversy ===
MacCarvill became a central figure in the political controversy that led to the resignation of Dr Conn Ward from government in 1946. The dispute began after Ward, managing director and majority shareholder of the Monaghan Curing Company, dismissed MacCarvill's brother, John MacCarvill, from his position as manager. Ward maintained that the dismissal was in the interests of the company's shareholders and was intended to allow Ward's own son to assume the role.

In May 1946, Patrick MacCarvill submitted a formal complaint to Taoiseach Éamon de Valera protesting his brother's dismissal. He also made a series of allegations concerning Ward's conduct, including claims that Ward had received payments from the salaries of temporary medical officers employed during his absence from medical practice, and that certain bacon sales had not been recorded in the company's accounts. De Valera regarded the allegations as potentially reflecting on Ward's conduct as a member of the government and ordered that the correspondence be made public in the Dáil.

Ward initially indicated that he intended to pursue legal action for libel, but instead requested a judicial inquiry into the allegations. A tribunal was established within days and, after hearing evidence, cleared Ward of the principal accusations, including those relating to the dismissal of John MacCarvill. However, it found that the company had failed to declare some trading activity and had submitted incomplete tax returns. Ward resigned as Parliamentary Secretary during the inquiry, and de Valera did not seek to defend him politically.

The controversy significantly damaged Ward's political career and contributed to wider criticism of the Fianna Fáil government before the 1948 Irish general election. MacCarvill subsequently stood as the Clann na Poblachta candidate for Monaghan in that election, cementing his departure from Fianna Fáil following the dispute. Ward did not contesnt the 1948 election.

== Personal life ==
In 1925 MacCarvill married Eileen McGrane, with whom he had five children.

Eileen McGrane was an Irish academic and republican activist who studied at University College Dublin, where she became involved in the nationalist movement and served as Captain of the university branch of Cumann na mBan, later also holding senior organisational roles. During the War of Independence, she worked closely with Michael Collins in intelligence and administrative duties, acting as a courier, carrying funds and assisting with confidential communications. Her flat on Dawson Street became a covert centre for IRA intelligence activities and the storage of sensitive documents. Following a British raid on the premises in December 1920, McGrane was arrested, interrogated, charged with high treason and later imprisoned in Mountjoy Prison and Waltham Prison in Liverpool. While imprisoned, she served as Officer in Command of the women political prisoners and remained active in organising and representing them.

Following her release after the Anglo-Irish Treaty, McGrane sided with the anti-Treaty movement during the Irish Civil War, undertaking courier, intelligence and publicity work before being imprisoned again in 1923, when she was once more appointed Officer in Command of women prisoners. After the conflict she returned to academic life, became an author and supported Irish artists including Jack B. Yeats, Mainie Jellett and Evie Hone. According to contemporary obituaries, she remained committed to Irish cultural and political causes throughout her life while also becoming known for her hospitality and for maintaining friendships across political and religious divides. She died in 1984.

Dáil	Election	Deputy (Party)	Deputy (Party)	Deputy (Party)
2nd	1921	Seán MacEntee (SF)	Eoin O'Duffy (SF)	Ernest Blythe (SF)
3rd	1922	Patrick MacCarvill (AT-SF)	Eoin O'Duffy (PT-SF)	Ernest Blythe (PT-SF)
4th	1923	Patrick MacCarvill (Rep)	Patrick Duffy (CnaG)	Ernest Blythe (CnaG)
5th	1927 (Jun)	Patrick MacCarvill (FF)	Alexander Haslett (Ind.)	Ernest Blythe (CnaG)
6th	1927 (Sep)	Conn Ward (FF)	Alexander Haslett (Ind.)	Ernest Blythe (CnaG)
7th	1932	Conn Ward (FF)	Eamon Rice (FF)	Ernest Blythe (CnaG)
8th	1933	Conn Ward (FF)	Eamon Rice (FF)	Alexander Haslett (Ind.)
9th	1937	Conn Ward (FF)	Eamon Rice (FF)	James Dillon (FG)
10th	1938	Conn Ward (FF)	Bridget Rice (FF)	James Dillon (FG)
11th	1943	Conn Ward (FF)	Bridget Rice (FF)	James Dillon (Ind.)
12th	1944	Conn Ward (FF)	Bridget Rice (FF)	James Dillon (Ind.)
13th	1948	Patrick Maguire (FF)	Bridget Rice (FF)	James Dillon (Ind.)
14th	1951	Patrick Maguire (FF)	Bridget Rice (FF)	James Dillon (Ind.)
15th	1954	Patrick Mooney (FF)	Edward Kelly (FF)	James Dillon (FG)
16th	1957	Patrick Mooney (FF)	Eighneachán Ó hAnnluain (SF)	James Dillon (FG)
17th	1961	Patrick Mooney (FF)	Erskine H. Childers (FF)	James Dillon (FG)
18th	1965	Patrick Mooney (FF)	Erskine H. Childers (FF)	James Dillon (FG)
19th	1969	Billy Fox (FG)	Erskine H. Childers (FF)	John Conlan (FG)
20th	1973	Jimmy Leonard (FF)	Erskine H. Childers (FF)	John Conlan (FG)
20th	1973 by-election	Jimmy Leonard (FF)	Brendan Toal (FG)	John Conlan (FG)
21st	1977	Constituency abolished. See Cavan–Monaghan		
