= Deadbeat Hero =

Studio album by Doug Stanhope
- Released: September 21, 2004
- Genre: Comedy
- Length: 70:04
- Label: Stand Up! Records

Doug Stanhope chronology
Die Laughing (2002)	Deadbeat Hero (2004)	No Refunds (2008)

Deadbeat Hero
- Directed by: Shawn Amos
- Starring: Doug Stanhope
- Distributed by: Shout! Factory
- Release date: August 24, 2004
- Running time: 95 minutes
- Country: United States
- Language: English

Deadbeat Hero is Doug Stanhope's second stand-up comedy DVD and his fifth CD. Recorded at the Comedy Underground in Seattle, Washington in 2004, originally produced by Shout Factory, and released as part of the Ad Lib Breakout Comedy Series. It was reissued in 2007 by Stand Up! Records.

== Chapter/Track listing ==
1. "Steal Shit and Quit" - 2:34
2. "Leading You Into Battle" - 0:51
3. "He's Just Drunk" - 1:15
4. "Credit Where Credit Is Due" - 3:58
5. "Medicinal Marijuana" - 4:05
6. "New Holes" - 1:18
7. "Two-Headed Baby" - 4:58
8. "Breakfast Trannies" - 2:48
9. "Mississippi Dildo Bust" - 1:20
10. "Benefit For Fallen Officers" - 2:27
11. "Hero Pussy/Risk Life" - 1:40
12. "Troop Support(er)" - 4:10
13. "Rules of War" - 1:07
14. "Faggot" - 0:59
15. "What To Do About Mother" - 3:22
16. "Subway Breakfast" - 5:02
17. "Immigration" - 1:24
18. "Vasectomy" - 3:04
19. "Abortion" - 5:09
20. "Priest Molestation" - 2:54
21. "Marriage Is Gay" - 2:41
22. "Liberty And Justice For Who?" - 2:43
23. "Until The Mongols Come Over The Hills" - 1:38
24. "Democracy Is A Flawed Theory" - 0:52
25. "Trade Out" - 1:14
26. "Not Guilty" - 2:23
27. "Free Country?" - 3:53

== Bonus features ==
"Street Rants" features short clips of Doug performing outdoors with "Banjo Randy" McCleary providing a musical accompaniment. Street rants include: "I Am Who I Say I Am", "Equal Justice", "Free Samples", "Founding Fathers", and "A Lesson Learned". McCleary also provides the music for the DVD menus and the "Screen Saver"

"Doug Stanhope: Behind the Mullet" shows four clips of Stanhope's earliest stand-up performances. The clips are separated by the type of mullet he had at the time, each of which are given nicknames, including: "Beaver Paddle", "Mudflap", "Camaro Cut", and "Ape Drape".

"Screen Saver" (listed as "Greetings from Banjo Randy") shows a video of McCleary performing that repeats indefinitely. Though the viewer may choose between viewing the clip in widescreen and fullscreen, the image is relatively static making the term "screen saver" highly inaccurate.

== Packaging ==
Deadbeat Hero has been released in three different packaging styles: in a DVD case (with the CD version included as a "bonus audio disk"), in a jewel case as an "enhanced CD" (DVD included as a bonus) under the Ad Lib Breakout Comedy Series label, and again by Stand Up! Records in 2007 (also with bonus DVD included) with the Ad Lib Breakout Comedy Series branding removed.
