= Beer Hall Putsch (album) =

Live album by Doug Stanhope
- Released: December 3, 2013
- Recorded: 2013
- Venue: Dante's, Portland, Oregon
- Genre: Comedy
- Length: 58:57 (CD version); 60:44 (DVD version w/o bonus)
- Label: New Wave Dynamics
- Producer: Brian Hennigan (exec.); Tatiana Orozco (exec.); Jay Karas (exec.); Jay Chapman (exec.); Brian Volk-Weiss (also exec.); Jack Vaughn (also exec.)

Doug Stanhope chronology
Before Turning the Gun on Himself (2012)	Beer Hall Putsch (2013)	No Place Like Home (2016)

Professional ratings
Review scores
Source	Rating
Exclaim!	9/10 stars

Beer Hall Putsch is the ninth stand-up comedy album by Doug Stanhope. It was released on December 3, 2013, by New Wave Dynamics. It was recorded live at Dante's in Portland, Oregon. The DVD includes a bonus video podcast recorded on the night of the show. The album peaked at #1 on the US Billboard Comedy Albums chart.

== Title ==
The album title is a sardonic reference to the Beer Hall Putsch, the failed 1923 Nazi coup attempt. On a podcast with Bill Burr, Stanhope explained the choice of title, saying:

[The] Beer Hall Putsch was Hitler's failed attempt to overthrow the German government... And they'd all meet in beer halls and they'd rile each other up and scream and yell about the government and all that... But [Hitler] got them all to take to the streets finally to go overthrow the government and a few people got shot and he [Hitler] ran like a pussy. So that's the significance, is I talk a lot of shit, but when it comes down to it, I don’t do anything. I just yell in bars, is my point.

== Set listing ==
CD
No.	Title	Length
1.	"Drink to Have a Good Time"	2:51
2.	"The Lady and the Champ"	7:59
3.	"I Can Do Nothing Better Than You"	4:30
4.	"Farewell, Mother"	10:17
5.	"Occupy Elsewhere"	6:30
6.	"Incentive-Based Eugenics"	4:53
7.	"Triage the Charity"	2:25
8.	"10k Fun Run for Nothing"	4:43
9.	"60 Inches of AIDS on Any Given Sunday"	10:28
10.	"I Am Gay"	4:23
Total length:		58:57

DVD
No.	Title	Length
1.	"The Lady and the Champ"	11:51
2.	"Farewell, Mother"	14:48
3.	"Occupy Elsewhere"	11:24
4.	"Triage the Charity"	7:08
5.	"60 Inches of AIDS on Any Given Sunday"	15:31
6.	"Video Podcast" (Bonus)	25:44
Total length:		60:44

== Chart history ==
Chart (2013)	Peak position
US Top Comedy Albums (Billboard)	1
