= Refund =

Refund may refer to:

== Refunds of money ==
- Product return, a process in which a customer returns a product to the original retailer in exchange for money previously paid
- Money back guarantee, a guarantee that, if a buyer is not satisfied with a product or service, a refund will be made
- Tax refund, a refund on taxes when the tax liability is less than the taxes paid
- Refunding, when debt holders calls back bonds with the express purpose of reissuing new debt
- Deposit-refund system, a surcharge on a product when purchased and a rebate when it is returned
- Tax-free shopping, allows shoppers to get a refund of any sales tax

== Other uses ==
- Refund (horse), won the 1888 Preakness Stakes
- "The Refund," an episode of The Amazing World of Gumball

== See also ==
- Rebate (marketing)
- WP:REFUND
