= Patrick Mooney (Irish politician) =

Irish politician (1903–1989)

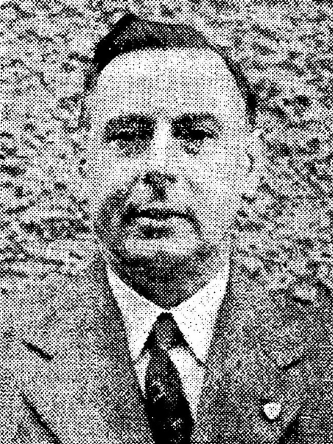
- Mooney in 1954

Teachta Dála
- In office May 1954 – June 1969
- Constituency: Monaghan

Personal details
- Born: 12 November 1903 County Monaghan, Ireland
- Died: 30 October 1989 (aged 85) County Monaghan, Ireland
- Party: Fianna Fáil

Patrick Mooney (12 November 1903 – 30 October 1989) was an Irish Fianna Fáil politician. He was elected to Dáil Éireann as a Fianna Fáil Teachta Dála (TD) for the Monaghan constituency at the 1954 general election. He was re-elected at the 1957, 1961 and 1965 general elections but lost his seat at the 1969 general election.

He stood as an Independent politician candidate for Monaghan at the 1973 general election. He was the Aontacht Éireann candidate at the 1973 Monaghan by-election.

| Dáil | Election | Deputy (Party) | Deputy (Party) | Deputy (Party) |
|---|---|---|---|---|
| 2nd | 1921 | Seán MacEntee (SF) | Eoin O'Duffy (SF) | Ernest Blythe (SF) |
| 3rd | 1922 | Patrick MacCarvill (AT-SF) | Eoin O'Duffy (PT-SF) | Ernest Blythe (PT-SF) |
| 4th | 1923 | Patrick MacCarvill (Rep) | Patrick Duffy (CnaG) | Ernest Blythe (CnaG) |
| 5th | 1927 (Jun) | Patrick MacCarvill (FF) | Alexander Haslett (Ind.) | Ernest Blythe (CnaG) |
| 6th | 1927 (Sep) | Conn Ward (FF) | Alexander Haslett (Ind.) | Ernest Blythe (CnaG) |
| 7th | 1932 | Conn Ward (FF) | Eamon Rice (FF) | Ernest Blythe (CnaG) |
| 8th | 1933 | Conn Ward (FF) | Eamon Rice (FF) | Alexander Haslett (Ind.) |
| 9th | 1937 | Conn Ward (FF) | Eamon Rice (FF) | James Dillon (FG) |
| 10th | 1938 | Conn Ward (FF) | Bridget Rice (FF) | James Dillon (FG) |
| 11th | 1943 | Conn Ward (FF) | Bridget Rice (FF) | James Dillon (Ind.) |
| 12th | 1944 | Conn Ward (FF) | Bridget Rice (FF) | James Dillon (Ind.) |
| 13th | 1948 | Patrick Maguire (FF) | Bridget Rice (FF) | James Dillon (Ind.) |
| 14th | 1951 | Patrick Maguire (FF) | Bridget Rice (FF) | James Dillon (Ind.) |
| 15th | 1954 | Patrick Mooney (FF) | Edward Kelly (FF) | James Dillon (FG) |
| 16th | 1957 | Patrick Mooney (FF) | Eighneachán Ó hAnnluain (SF) | James Dillon (FG) |
| 17th | 1961 | Patrick Mooney (FF) | Erskine H. Childers (FF) | James Dillon (FG) |
| 18th | 1965 | Patrick Mooney (FF) | Erskine H. Childers (FF) | James Dillon (FG) |
| 19th | 1969 | Billy Fox (FG) | Erskine H. Childers (FF) | John Conlan (FG) |
| 20th | 1973 | Jimmy Leonard (FF) | Erskine H. Childers (FF) | John Conlan (FG) |
| 20th | 1973 by-election | Jimmy Leonard (FF) | Brendan Toal (FG) | John Conlan (FG) |
| 21st | 1977 | Constituency abolished. See Cavan–Monaghan | | |
