= Judith Heneghan =

British author and lecturer (born 1965)

Judith Heneghan (born 1965) is a British novelist, and a senior lecturer in creative writing at the University of Winchester, England.

== Biography ==
Heneghan was born in Hampshire and educated in Southampton and at the University of York. For two years she lived and worked in a community for people with learning differences near Dover; later she worked as a commissioning editor for Hodder, then married a journalist and lived in Kyiv, Moscow and Islamabad before settling in Winchester. She has written over 60 children's fiction and nonfiction books and two novels for adults. She has a doctorate in creative arts from the University of Winchester.

== Works ==
- Novels
  - Snegurochka, Salt, 2019, ISBN 978-1784631741
  - Birdeye, Salt, 2024, ISBN 9781784633264
- Books for children (incomplete list):
  - Stonecipher, Andersen, 2005, ISBN 978-1842703656
  - The King of Kites, Evans, 2009, ISBN 978-0237538804
  - Dragon School series:
    - Ruby's So Rude, Wayland (Hachette), 2013, ISBN 978-0750279581
    - Brandon's So Bossy, Wayland, 2013, ISBN 978-0750279598
    - Noah's So Noisy, Wayland, 2013, ISBN 978-0750279604
    - Jasmine's So Fussy, Wayland, 2013, ISBN 978-0750279611
  - Living Leaf: The Story of How Plants Grow and Survive, 2015, ISBN 978-0750287654
  - Love Your Hamster, Wayland, 2013, ISBN 978-0750268943 (School Library Association Children's Choice Award)
  - All Kinds of Bodies, Wayland, 2016, ISBN 978-0778768012
  - Why do People Move Home?, Wayland, 2024, ISBN 9781445187655
