= John Heneghan =

- Born: 21 December 1881; Louisburgh, County Mayo, Ireland
- Died: 10 February 1945 (aged 63); Manila, Philippines
- Awards: Medal of Freedom

John Heneghan (21 December 1881 – 10 February 1945) was an Irish priest, editor, and a member of the Maynooth Mission to China, who was murdered by the Japanese forces in the Battle of Manila in 1945. Heneghan was born in Louisburgh, County Mayo, Ireland, in 1882, the son of Walter Heneghan. He was educated at St Jarlath's College, Tuam, and St Patrick's College, Maynooth. His sister was Bridget Rice.

He was ordained in Maynooth, in June 1909, by the Archbishop of Dublin, William Walsh. During Easter Week 1916, he heard the confessions of Tuam Volunteers on their way to Athenry to joining the Easter Rising.

During World War II, he was the superior of the Maynooth missionaries in the Philippines.

== Death ==
On 10 February 1945, he was removed from Manila together with three other Columban priests, and killed by Japanese forces. In February 1997, there was a monument erected in front of the Malate Church, in the memory of Heneghan, Fallon, Kelly, and Monaghan; his nephew and namesake, Monsignor John Heneghan of California attended the unveiling.

There is a remembrance bench in the Mayo Peace park dedicated to Heneghan.

He was posthumously awarded the Medal of Freedom, the highest civilian decoration which the U.S can give to non-U.S. nationals, along with his confreres Fr. Kelly and Lawlor.

== See also ==
- List of kidnappings (1900–1949)

== Publications ==
- White Martyrdom by The Rev. John Heneghan, Published by St. Columban's, Milton, Massachusetts (1946)
- The Secret Scripture of the Poor by Rev. John Heneghan, Published by Clonmore and Reynolds, Ltd., Dublin (1951)
- Father Damien Exemplar of Noble Deeds by Rev. John Heneghan, Published by Clonmore and Reynolds, Ltd., Dublin (1954)
