= Gavan Hennigan =

Irish extreme sports athlete

Gavan Hennigan (born 1981) is an Irish Extreme Environment Athlete.

== Background ==
Hennigan grew up in Galway, Ireland. At the age of 16, he began abusing alcohol and drugs as a means to deal with his homosexuality and his father's alcoholism. Hennigan travelled abroad, living in a squat in Amsterdam and an unfurnished flat in London. He suffered blackouts from alcohol and drug overdoses, eventually entering rehab for his addictions when he was 21.

== Sports career ==
By trade a saturation diver on oil rigs for over 10 years, in 2016 Hennigan became the "fastest solo competitor in the history of the Talisker Whisky Atlantic Challenge, dubbed the world's toughest row." Hennigan completed the three thousand mile long journey in "49 days, 11 hours and 37 minutes."

In 2020, Hennigan was the Iditarod Trail Invitational ITI350 men's foot champion, finishing the 350 mile route in 6 days, 12 hours, and 37 minutes.

In 2024, Hennigan returned to Iditarod Trail Invitational to compete in the ITI1000. He finished the 1000 mile route as the men's foot champion, completing the event in 24 days, 18 hours, and 9 minutes.

== Charitable work ==
Hennigan pursues snowboarding, mountaineering, ultra running, and rowing, raising over €12,000 for local Galway charities.
