= Brian Hennigan =

British novelist, producer and director

Brian Hennigan is a Scottish novelist, producer and director. Born in Edinburgh, Scotland, he graduated from the University of St. Andrews with a degree in Philosophy with International Relations. Hennigan then taught English at Lanzhou University in the People's Republic of China, and at TDK in Akita Prefecture, northern Japan. He subsequently obtained an MSc in Japanese from Stirling University, Scotland.

Hennigan worked in marketing with Nissan Europe, Pringle of Scotland, The Macallan Malt Whisky and Australian property company Lend Lease.

Hennigan's first novel, Patrick Robertson: A Tale of Adventure, was published by Jonathan Cape in 2000 and re-published by Polygon, an imprint of Birlinn Limited in 2006. The book was re-released for America in 2016. A second novel, The Scheme of Things, was published in 2005 by Polygon. Following the publication of his second novel, Hennigan served as a weekly columnist for the Edinburgh Evening News. His most recent work was the 2009 short story "The Kelso Occupation," which appeared in the debut issue of Gutter magazine. Patrick Robertson, numerous short stories and the play A Table for St. Bernard have been broadcast on BBC Radio Four. The BBC has also commissioned Hennigan to develop multiple sitcoms.

From 2008–2009 Hennigan studied at the Los Angeles City College Film School, during which time he interned with producer Gail Mutrux. His first short film, Duck Man, was shown at the American Film Institute Festival in Dallas, the Mill Valley Film Festival and Silver Lake Film Festival in California, and at the Molodist International Film Festival in Kyiv. He followed this with the short film Background Specialist in 2012. He served as executive producer on the 2012 documentary The Unbookables.

A comedy producer at the Edinburgh Festival Fringe, Hennigan produced the UK debuts of stand-up comedians Doug Stanhope, Maria Bamford, Laurie Kilmartin and Dwight Slade. He has established a production and management relationship with American stand-up comedian Doug Stanhope, whom he has worked with since 2002. Hennigan directed Doug Stanhope's No Place Like Home.

In addition, he has produced 4 specials for Stanhope:

- Oslo: Burning The Bridge To Nowhere (2011)
- Before Turning the Gun on Himself (2012)
- Beer Hall Putsch (2013)
- Doug Stanhope: No Place Like Home (2016)
