= No Refunds (film) =

- Starring: Doug Stanhope
- Release date: August 14, 2007
- Running time: 70 minutes
- Country: United States
- Language: English

No Refunds is Doug Stanhope's third stand-up DVD, recorded at the Gotham Comedy Club in New York, NY on March 12, 2007. The performance originally aired August 3, 2007 on Showtime.

== Track listing ==
1. "Introduction"
2. "Sanitized Generation"
3. "Carnival Head"
4. "Drugs for a Brave New Cubicle"
5. "Will Work for Vagina"
6. "Secret of My Success"
7. "Funnier Drunk"
8. "Live for Your Sins"
9. "Jew Jew Jew Jew Jew"
10. "Died Right on Time"
11. "National Pride"
12. "Einstein Was an Immigrant Worker"
13. "Fear for Your Own Safety"
14. "Rampant on the Internet"
15. "My Fetus Is a Centerfold"
16. "Fuck the Yankees!"
17. "End Credits"

== Bonus features ==
The DVD features three bonus clips: "Laugh If It's Funny" (deleted footage from the beginning of the show, "Doug Fucks Up" (bloopers from the DVD's introduction), and "What the Fuck Is He Talking About?" (outtakes from the show).
