= Jeremy Renner Official =

Mobile app created by American actor Jeremy Renner

Jeremy Renner Official (or Jeremy Renner on the Google Play Store) was a mobile app created by American actor Jeremy Renner. He created the app in March 2017 to hear the input and comments of his fans. The app was shut down in September 2019 in part due to the frequent bullying and trolling that the platform had experienced. The app featured optional microtransactions, with some ranging up to roughly US$400 despite the app itself being free. Upon shutting down the app, Renner issued a mass-refund for the collectible "stars" in the app for purchases made within the last ninety days, from the day the announcement was posted. He then posted an apology to the app itself, and the app was deleted from both the Google Play Store and the App Store shortly after.

== Usage ==
Upon downloading the app, the user was faced with a video of Renner speaking about his fans and superfans, regular giveaways, and real-life updates. While the app was active, Renner posted regular questions and comments for fans. Renner occasionally livestreamed about his work and day-to-day life. The community developed to include memes, selfies, and a "Happy Rennsday" event on Wednesdays.

== History ==
=== 2017–2019 ===
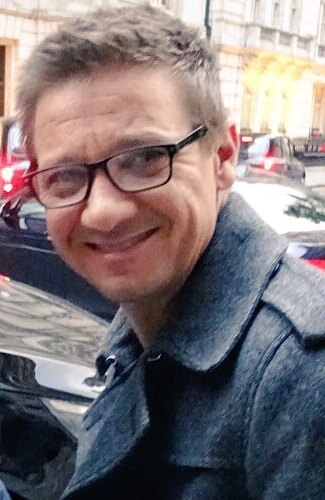
Renner in 2016

The app launched in March 2017 with a promotional contest. Renner's fans were encouraged to download the app and create comments about being Renner's biggest fan; Renner would then choose a winner and transport the winner and a guest to have lunch with him at the Calgary Expo. In the first few months Renner teased behind-the-scenes of projects he was working on, which he now sporadically does on Instagram. The app was similarly designed to Instagram as well, with a near identically styled layout. Around midway through 2019, a hoax account of Renner was made to mock the celebrity, joking about masturbating to porn and defending another hoax account of Casey Anthony.

FastCompany wrote extensively about Renner's app in April 2019, calling it "a surprising new kind of social media". The Ringer stated "Jeremy Renner's Jeremy Renner app is the Jeremy Renner of apps."

=== After deletion (2019–2020) ===
After the shutdown of the app, a comedy-based pseudo-app with modular endings was released, called "The Jeremy Renner App Experience", in which the player plays as Jeremy Renner on the day of the Jeremy Renner Official app's shutdown. The app details several different choices on how Renner handles the situation. A six-part podcast was also created to mock the app's deletion, called The Renner Files, featuring Carolyn Goldfarb and Sarah Ramos.

== Controversies ==
=== Marketing ===
One of the main controversies of Renner's app was its marketing. The app's developers, Escapex, specialized in and grew famous for making similar monetized apps for celebrities. The marketing campaign was based on direct contact with Renner, whose chances were increased with regular payments for "stars", although very few encounters seemed to happen with Renner himself. The multiple problems with the app led the CEO of Escapex, Sephi Shapira, to call the app a "freak situation", and added "Am I concerned about this? Not more than I'm concerned about 50 other things I'm dealing with as a startup company." Along with the marketing failures, the app was seen as misrepresenting itself as seemingly erotic with some advertisements featuring Renner suggestively staring at the camera, despite the actual app being initially considered safe for children.

=== Harassment ===
After its release in 2017, the app was met with waves of harassment and bullying by many users on the app, most frequently by using impersonation — referenced in Renner's apology/deletion notice. Some death threats were made across the app by fraud accounts pretending to be several controversial celebrities, including O. J. Simpson and Casey Anthony.

As early as October 2017, there were claims of censorship, bullying, and "contest-rigging". In September 2019, comedian Stefan Heck publicized his discovery of the fact that replies through the app appeared as if they were sent by Renner himself in push notifications. After several users abused this feature, Renner asked Escapex to shut down the app.
