= List of awards and nominations received by Jeremy Renner =

Jeremy Renner awards and nominations
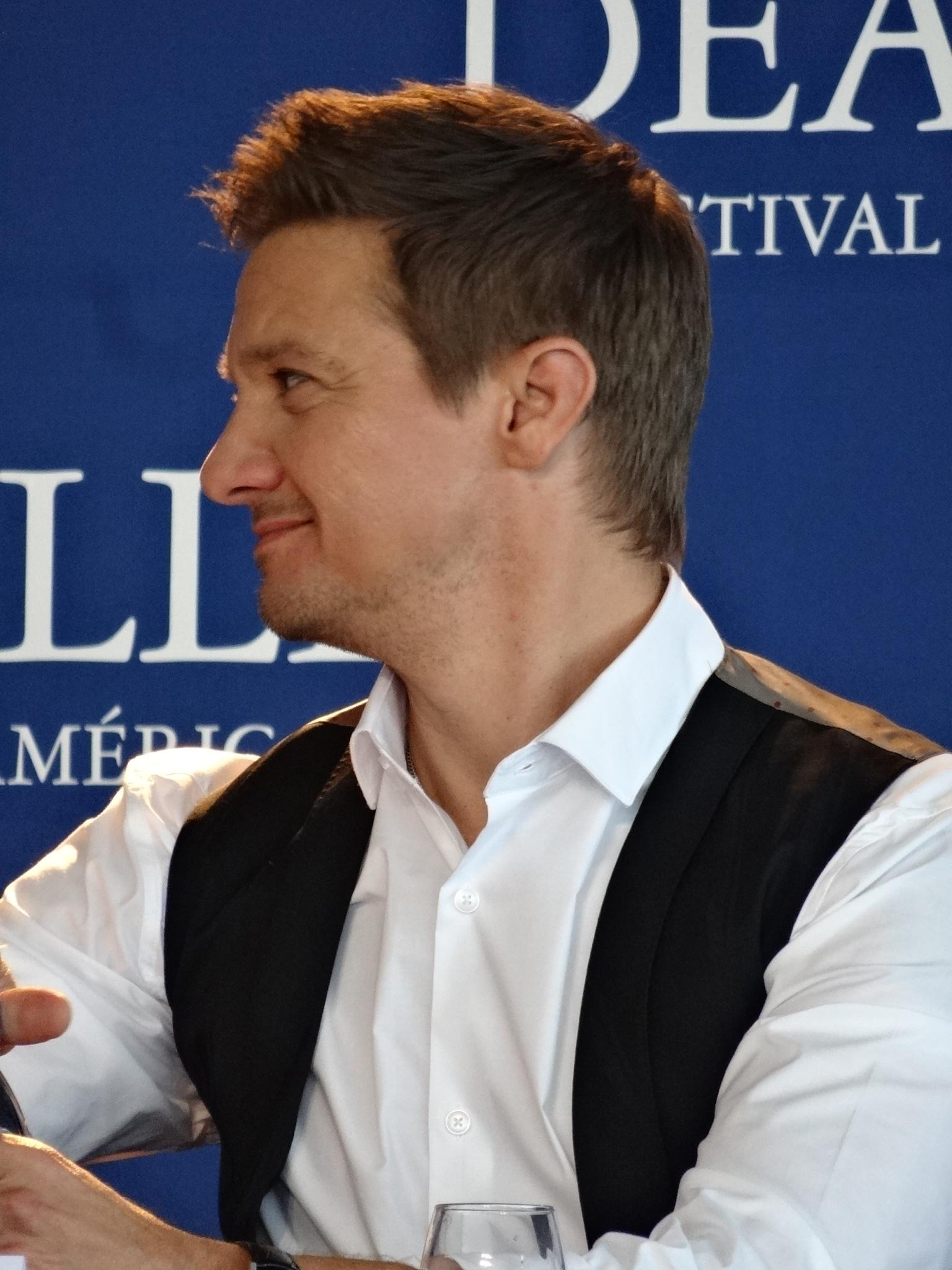
- Renner at Festival Deauville in 2012
Awards and nominations
Award	Wins	Nominations
Academy Award	0	2
Screen Actors Guild	1	4
Golden Globe	0	1
Critics' Choice	1	4

Totals (Note: Certain award groups do not simply award one winner. They acknowledge several different recipients, have runners-up, and have third place. Since this is a specific recognition and is different from losing an award, runner-up mentions are considered wins in this award tally. For simplification and to avoid errors, each award in this list has been presumed to have had a prior nomination.)
- Wins: 52
- Nominations: 103

Accolades received by Jeremy Renner per film

Year	Film	Accolades
2014	Kill the Messenger	6
2013	The Immigrant	2
2013	American Hustle	17
2012	The Bourne Legacy	1
2012	The Avengers	3
2011	Thor	1
2010	The Town	20
2009	The Hurt Locker	44
2007	Take	2
2005	Neo Ned	1
2005	North Country	1
2003	SWAT	1
2002	Dahmer	1
2001	Fish in a Barrel	1

This is a list of awards and nominations received by Jeremy Renner, American actor. He has been formally recognized for roles in Fish in a Barrel (2001), Dahmer (2002), S.W.A.T. (2003), Neo Ned (2005), Take (2007), The Hurt Locker (2008), The Town (2010), The Avengers (2012), American Hustle (2013), The Immigrant (2013) and Kill the Messenger (2014). While Fish in a Barrel (2001) marked Renner's first formal distinction of his film career, his performance as the titular character in Dahmer (2002) earned him his first major industry nomination for Best Male Lead at the 2003 Independent Spirit Awards. Following this success, Renner has most notably achieved two Academy Award nominations for Best Actor and Best Supporting Actor for his roles in The Hurt Locker (2008) and The Town (2010), respectively. In 2014, Renner won his first Broadcast Film Critics Association Award and Screen Actors Guild Award for Best Acting Ensemble alongside the cast of American Hustle (2013).

== Industry ==
=== Academy Awards ===
Year	Nominated work	Category	Result
2010	The Hurt Locker	Best Actor	Nominated
2011	The Town	Best Supporting Actor	Nominated

=== BAFTA Film Awards ===
Year	Nominated work	Category	Result
2010	The Hurt Locker	Best Actor in a Leading Role	Nominated

=== Critics' Choice Movie Awards ===
Year	Nominated work	Category	Result
2010	The Hurt Locker	Best Actor	Nominated
2011	The Town	Best Supporting Actor	Nominated
2011	The Town	Best Acting Ensemble	Nominated
2014	American Hustle	Best Acting Ensemble	Won

=== Golden Globe Awards ===
Year	Nominated work	Category	Result
2011	The Town	Best Supporting Actor	Nominated

=== Independent Spirit Awards ===
Year	Nominated work	Category	Result
2003	Dahmer	Best Male Lead	Nominated
2009	The Hurt Locker	Best Male Lead	Nominated

=== Screen Actors Guild Awards ===
Year	Nominated work	Category	Result
2010	The Hurt Locker	Outstanding Actor	Nominated
2010	The Hurt Locker	Outstanding Cast	Nominated
2011	The Town	Outstanding Supporting Actor	Nominated
2014	American Hustle	Outstanding Cast	Won

== Critics ==
=== Women Film Journalists ===
Year	Nominated work	Category	Result
2009	The Hurt Locker	Best Actor	Nominated
2009	The Hurt Locker	Best Acting Ensemble	Won
2013	American Hustle	Best Acting Ensemble	Won

=== Boston Film Critics ===
Year	Nominated work	Category	Result
2009	The Hurt Locker	Best Actor	Won

=== Chicago Film Critics ===
Year	Nominated work	Category	Result
2009	The Hurt Locker	Best Actor	Won

=== Dallas-Fort Worth Film Critics ===
Year	Nominated work	Category	Result
2009	The Hurt Locker	Best Actor	3rd Place
2010	The Town	Best Supporting Actor	3rd Place

=== Denver Film Critics Society ===
Year	Nominated work	Category	Result
2009	The Hurt Locker	Best Ensemble	Nominated
2010	The Town	Best Supporting Actor	Nominated

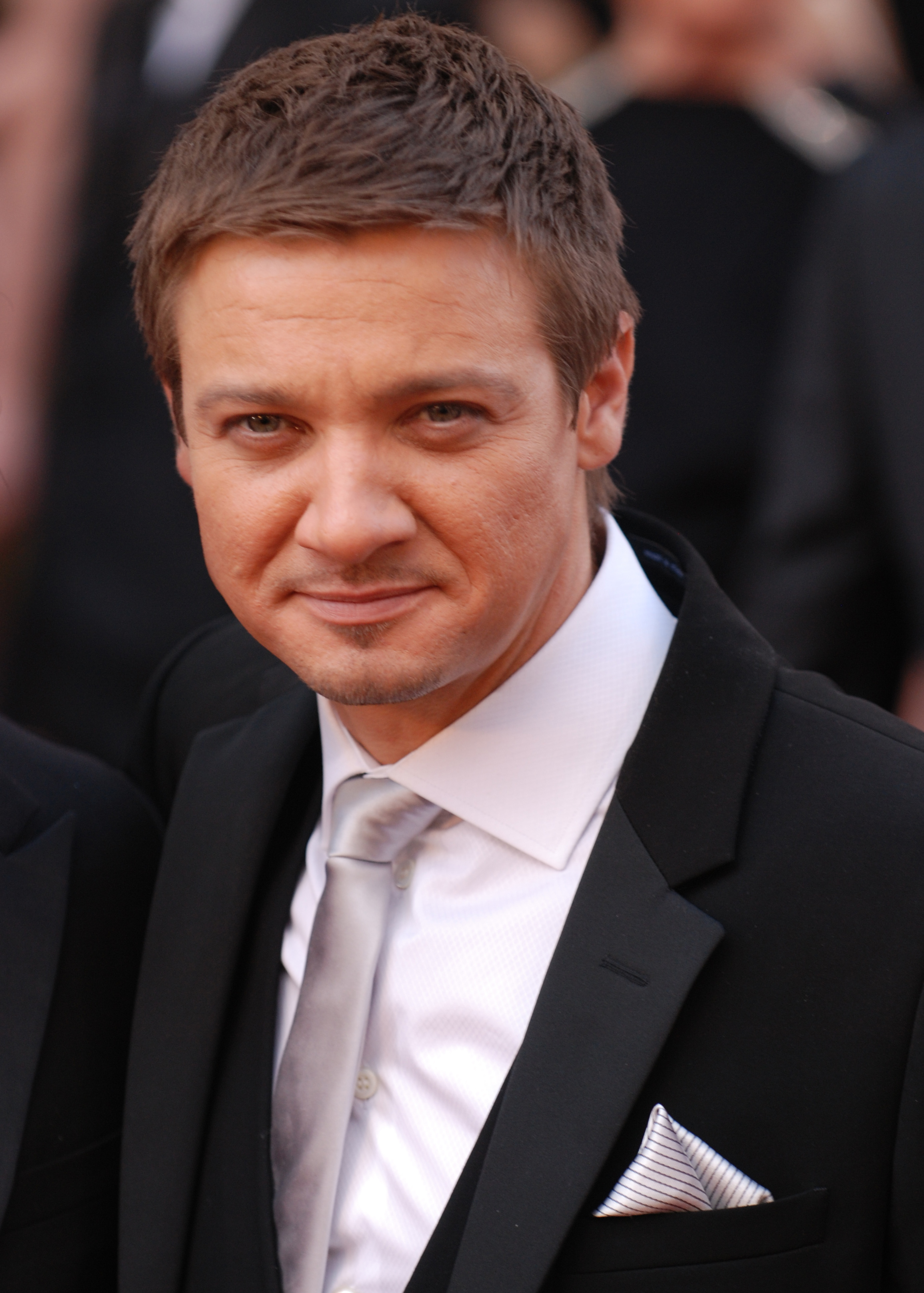
Renner at the 82nd Annual Academy Awards for his nomination in The Hurt Locker

=== Detroit Film Critics ===
Year	Nominated work	Category	Result
2012	The Avengers	Best Ensemble	Nominated
2013	American Hustle	Best Ensemble	Won

=== Dorian ===
Year	Nominated work	Category	Result
2010	The Hurt Locker	Breakthrough Performance Award	Nominated
2010	The Hurt Locker	Best Performance of the Year	Nominated

=== Gotham ===
Year	Nominated work	Category	Result
2009	The Hurt Locker	Breakthrough Actor	Nominated
2009	The Hurt Locker	Best Ensemble Cast	Won

=== Houston Film Critics ===
Year	Nominated work	Category	Result
2009	The Hurt Locker	Best Actor	Nominated
2010	The Town	Best Supporting Actor	Nominated

=== Indiana Film Journalists ===
Year	Nominated work	Category	Result
2013	American Hustle	Best Supporting Actor	2nd Place

=== Las Vegas Film Critics ===
Year	Nominated work	Category	Result
2009	The Hurt Locker	Sierra Award for Best Actor	Won

=== National Board of Review ===
Year	Nominated work	Category	Result
2009	The Hurt Locker	Breakthrough Performance by an Actor	Won
2010	The Town	Best Acting by an Ensemble	Won

=== National Society of Critics ===
Year	Nominated work	Category	Result
2010	The Hurt Locker	Best Actor	Won
2011	The Town	Best Supporting Actor	3rd Place

=== New York Film Critics ===
Year	Nominated work	Category	Result
2009	The Hurt Locker	Best Actor	3rd Place

=== Online New York Critics ===
Year	Nominated work	Category	Result
2013	American Hustle	Best Ensemble	Won

=== North Texas Film Critics ===
Year	Nominated work	Category	Result
2010	The Town	Best Supporting Actor	3rd Place

=== Online Film Critics ===
Year	Nominated work	Category	Result
2010	The Hurt Locker	Best Actor	Won

=== Phoenix Film Critics ===
Year	Nominated work	Category	Result
2013	American Hustle	Best Acting Ensemble	Won

=== San Diego Film Critics ===
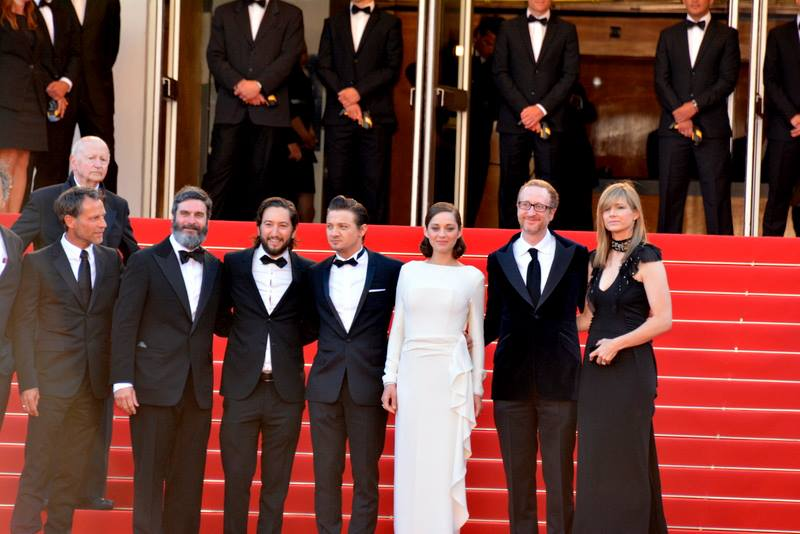
Renner with cast and crew of The Immigrant at the 2012 Cannes Film Festival

Year	Nominated work	Category	Result
2009	The Hurt Locker	Best Actor	Nominated
2010	The Town	Best Supporting Actor	Nominated
2013	American Hustle	Best Ensemble	Won

=== Satellite ===
Year	Nominated work	Category	Result
2009	The Hurt Locker	Best Actor in a Motion Picture, Drama	Won
2010	The Town	Best Supporting Actor	Nominated

=== Southeastern Film Critics ===
Year	Nominated work	Category	Result
2009	The Hurt Locker	Best Actor	2nd Place
2013	American Hustle	Best Ensemble	Won

=== St. Louis Film Critics ===
Year	Nominated work	Category	Result
2009	The Hurt Locker	Best Actor	Nominated

=== Utah Film Critics ===
Year	Nominated work	Category	Result
2009	The Hurt Locker	Best Actor	2nd Place

=== Vancouver Film Critics ===
Year	Nominated work	Category	Result
2010	The Hurt Locker	Best Actor	Nominated

=== Village Voice Poll ===
Year	Nominated work	Category	Result
2008	The Hurt Locker	Best Actor	Won

=== Washington Film Critics ===
Year	Nominated work	Category	Result
2009	The Hurt Locker	Best Actor	Nominated
2009	The Hurt Locker	Best Breakthrough Performance	Nominated
2009	The Hurt Locker	Best Acting Ensemble	Won
2010	The Town	Best Acting Ensemble	Won
2013	American Hustle	Best Acting Ensemble	Nominated
2014	Kill the Messenger	Best Portrayal of Washington, D.C (Note: Joe Barber Award was collectively recognized by the director and producers of the film, including Renner and his production company The Combine.)	Nominated

=== Women Film Critics ===
Year	Nominated work	Category	Result
2014	Kill the Messenger	Best Actor	Nominated
2014	Kill the Messenger	Best Male Images in a Movie	Nominated

== Film Festivals ==
=== Hollywood ===
Year	Nominated work	Category	Result
2009	The Hurt Locker	Breakthrough Award	Won

=== Karlovy Vary ===
Year	Nominated work	Category	Result
2017	Wind River	President's Award	Won

=== Newport Beach ===
Year	Nominated work	Category	Result
2014	The Immigrant	Outstanding Achievement in Filmmaking-Ensemble Cast	Won

=== New York ===
Year	Nominated work	Category	Result
2001	Fish in a Barrel	Best Supporting Actor	Won

=== Palm Beach ===
Year	Nominated work	Category	Result
2006	Neo Ned	Best Actor	Won

=== Palm Springs ===
Year	Nominated work	Category	Result
2010	The Hurt Locker	Breakthrough Performance Award	Won
2014	American Hustle	Ensemble Cast Award	Won

=== Phoenix ===
Year	Nominated work	Category	Result
2008	Take	Best Acting Ensemble	Won

== International ==
=== Huading ===
Year	Nominated work	Category	Result
2014	American Hustle	Best Global Supporting Actor	Won

=== Taormina ===
Year	Nominated work	Category	Result
2016	Collective body of work	Taormina Promesse Award	Won

== Others ==
=== Kids Choice ===
Year	Nominated work	Category	Result
2017	Captain America: Civil War	#SQUAD	Nominated
2022	Hawkeye	Favorite Male TV star (Family)	Nominated

=== MTV ===
Year	Nominated work	Category	Result
2013	The Avengers	Best Fight	Won

=== People's Choice ===
Year	Nominated work	Category	Result
2013	The Avengers	Favorite On-Screen Chemistry	Nominated

=== Teen Choice ===
Year	Nominated work	Category	Result
2010	The Hurt Locker	Choice Movie Actor: Drama	Nominated
2016	Captain America: Civil War	Choice Movie Chemistry	Nominated
2017	Arrival	Choice Sci-fi Movie Actor	Nominated

=== Uncle Magazine's Uncle Awards ===
Year	Category	Result
2023	Uncle of the Year	Won
