= Holliston Coleman =

American actress

- Born: Holliston Taylor Coleman; June 30, 1992 (age 34); Pasadena, California, U.S.
- Other names: Holli Coleman; Holliston
- Education: Columbia University
- Occupations: Actress, singer
- Years active: 1997–2013, 2026–present
- Spouse: David Dizon
- Relatives: Bobby Coleman (brother)

Holliston Taylor Coleman (born June 30, 1992) is a former American actress. She is perhaps best known for starring in the Paramount feature film, Bless the Child, and her recurring role in the television series Medium.

== Life and career ==
Coleman was born Holliston Taylor Coleman on June 30, 1992, in Pasadena, California, the daughter of Doris (née Berg) and Robert Moorhouse Coleman, Jr. She is the elder sister of actor Bobby Coleman. Coleman began acting at age four when, on her first theatrical audition, she booked the part of Horace Bing's daughter in the television series Dr. Quinn Medicine Woman.

At the age of 8, Coleman booked the title role as "the Child" (Cody) in the Paramount feature film Bless the Child, starring opposite Academy Award winner Kim Basinger. Coleman played an autistic child overwhelmed by messages from God and pursued by agents of evil.

On January 17, 2026, Coleman released her debut single, "Flowerbed" under the stage name Holliston.

== Personal life ==
Coleman currently works for "Five Acres", a child care facility in Los Angeles, California.

== Filmography ==
=== Television ===
Year	Show	Role	Episode
1997	Dr. Quinn, Medicine Woman	Samantha Bing	"Before the Dawn"
1997	Ally McBeal	Cara Dawson (age 4)	"The Affair"
1998	Baywatch	Bridget	"Countdown"
1999	Power Rangers Lost Galaxy	Mandy	"Memories of Mirinoi"
2001	Judging Amy	Leslie Crouse	"The Last Word"
2002	ER	Brianna Cooper	"It's All in Your Head"
2002	Touched by an Angel	Daniella 'Danni' Blake	"Hello, I Love You"
2004	Law & Order: Special Victims Unit	Melanie Cramer	"Charisma"
2007	Private Practice	Tess Sullivan	"In Which Charlotte Goes Down the Rabbit Hole"
2005–2010	Medium	Hannah	recurring
2009	Mental	Leeza	"Coda"

=== Film ===
Year	Film	Role	Notes
1999	Supreme Sanction	Bailey McNamara	TV movie
2000	Bless the Child	Cody O'Connor	
2001	Dinner with Friends	Laurie	TV movie
2002	Hard Cash	Megan	aka Run for the Money
2002	Miss Lettie and Me	Travis	TV movie
2003	A Carol Christmas	Lily	TV movie
2004	The Hollywood Mom's Mystery	Chloe Freers	TV movie
2005	Lilo & Stitch 2: Stitch Has a Glitch	Teresa	Direct to video
2007	Love's Unending Legacy	Belinda Marshall	TV movie
2009	Touched	Nilsa	
2013	Robosapien: Rebooted	Megan	

== Awards ==
Year	Award	Category	Role	Result
2001	Young Artist Award	Best Performance in a Feature Film - Young Actress Age Ten or Under	Cody O'Connor in Bless the Child	Nominated
2001	Saturn Award	Best Performance by a Younger Actor	Cody O'Connor in Bless the Child	Nominated
2003	Young Artist Award	Best Performance in a TV Movie, Mini-Series or Special - Supporting Young Actress	Travis in Miss Lettie and Me	Nominated

== Discography ==
=== Singles ===
Song	Details	Album	
Song	Details	Album	Date Released
Flowerbed	Writers: David Dizon, Holliston Coleman; Label: Independent; Format: Digital Download	TBD	January 17, 2026
