= Martian Child =

- Theatrical release poster
- Directed by: Menno Meyjes
- Screenplay by: Seth E. Bass; Jonathan Tolins
- Based on: The Martian Child by David Gerrold
- Produced by: Ed Elbert; David Kirschner; Toby Emmerich
- Starring: John Cusack; Amanda Peet; Sophie Okonedo; Oliver Platt; Bobby Coleman; Joan Cusack
- Cinematography: Robert D. Yeoman
- Edited by: Bruce Green
- Music by: Aaron Zigman
- Production companies: MERADIN Zweite Productions; David Kirschner Productions
- Distributed by: New Line Cinema
- Release date: November 2, 2007
- Running time: 106 minutes
- Country: United States
- Language: English
- Budget: $27 million
- Box office: $9.4 million

Martian Child is a 2007 American comedy-drama film directed by Menno Meyjes and based on David Gerrold's 1994 novelette (not the expanded 2002 novel) The Martian Child. The film stars John Cusack as a writer who adopts a strange young boy (Bobby Coleman) who believes himself to be from Mars. The film was theatrically released on November 2, 2007, by New Line Cinema.

== Plot ==
David Gordon, a popular science fiction author, widowed two years prior as they were trying to adopt a child, is finally matched with a young boy, Dennis. Initially hesitant to adopt alone, he is drawn to him, seeing aspects of himself in him.

Believing he is from Mars, Dennis protects himself from the sun's harmful rays, wears weights to counter Earth's weak gravity, eats only Lucky Charms, and hangs upside down to facilitate circulation. He refers often to his mission to study Earth and its people, taking pictures, taking things to catalog, and spending time consulting an ambiguous toy-like device with flashing lights that produces seemingly unintelligible words.

Once David decides to adopt Dennis, he spends time getting to know him, patiently coaxing him out of the large cardboard box in which he hides. Soon, David is cleared to take Dennis home and meet David's dog, "Somewhere." In Dennis's bedroom is a projector of the Solar System that he pronounces inaccurately. With the help of his friend Harlee and sister Liz, David tries to help Dennis overcome his delusion by both indulging it and encouraging him to act like everyone else. Dennis attends school but is quickly expelled for repeatedly 'stealing' items for his collection. Frustrated, David tells Liz that perhaps Dennis is from Mars.

Meanwhile, David's literary agent, Jeff, pushes him to finish writing his commissioned sequel, which is due soon. He struggles to make time for writing, regularly pulled away from it to deal with Dennis. While sitting down to write, the flash from Dennis's Polaroid camera catches him off-guard and he accidentally breaks some glass. David picks up Dennis and carries him across the room. Upset by David's abrupt action, the boy fears that he is going to be sent away. David explains that he was just worried he would get cut by the glass and that he loves him more than his material possessions. Assuring him that he will never send him away, he encourages Dennis to break more things. They move to the kitchen and break dishes and then spray ketchup and dish detergent at each other. Lefkowitz, from Social Services, appears in the window and sees the mayhem. He rebukes David, setting up a case review.

David encourages Dennis to be from Mars only at home; though he must be from Earth everywhere else. Passing his interview by saying that he was pretending, he stays with David. Now his adoptive father, he insists Dennis acknowledge being from Earth, making him hurt and angry. David leaves him with Liz to attend the reveal of his new book, supposedly a sequel. He confesses to Tina, the publisher, that rather than being a sequel, it is a new book titled Martian Child, about Dennis. In her fury, Tina makes a scene, but takes the manuscript as David leaves to be with Dennis.

Meanwhile, Dennis has left the house with his suitcase of earthly artifacts. When David arrives home, he finds the police and learns the boy is gone, he remembers the place he had said he was found. David asks Harlee to drive him to the location, where they spot Dennis high up on the outside ledge of the museum's domed roof. David climbs up to him as the police and Liz arrive. Dennis points out a bright searchlight in a nearby cloud as someone coming to take him home, but David assures him that it is just a helicopter. David professes his love for Dennis and asserts that he will never ever leave him. Eventually Dennis trusts David and they hug.

David's voiceover tells about the parallel of children who come into our world, struggling to understand it, being like little aliens. As Tina reads the manuscript aboard an airplane, she begins to cry.

== Cast ==
- John Cusack as David
- Bobby Coleman as Dennis
- Amanda Peet as Harlee
- Sophie Okonedo as Sophie
- Joan Cusack as Liz
- Oliver Platt as Jeff
- Richard Schiff as Lefkowitz
- Howard Hesseman as Dr. Berg

In addition, Anjelica Huston plays Tina, David's publisher.

== Production ==
Despite persistent misperceptions, this film is not based on David Gerrold's 2002 semi-autobiographical novel The Martian Child, (although it shares some of the same incidents) but rather is based on his 1994 fictional Hugo and Nebula Award-winning novella of the same name, which has caused much confusion about the source material, especially for Gerrold's fans in segments of the gay community. The short story does not specify the protagonist's sexual orientation. Only when, years later, Gerrold rewrote and expanded his story to novella length did he choose to include his sexuality. While Gerrold had, in real life, adopted a son as an openly gay man, in the film the protagonist is straight and has a female love interest. Because of the confusion surrounding the different publication dates of the original short story and the latter novella, some members of the gay community have criticized the lead role in the film being portrayed as straight, even though the main character in the short story was never identified as gay. Gerrold has expressed disappointment that the producers forced the protagonist to be changed from a gay man to a straight widower but felt it was a worthwhile trade-off to get published a story about a child in a group home needing a parent.

The film began shooting in Vancouver on May 2, 2005, and completed filming in July 2005, with the studio repeatedly pushing back the release date. Jerry Zucker was hired to direct uncredited reshoots shortly before the film's release.

== Release ==
=== Box office ===
Martian Child opened in 2,020 venues on November 2, 2007, and earned $3,376,669 in its first weekend, ranking seventh in the domestic box office and third among the weekend's new releases. The film closed six weeks later on December 13, having grossed $7,500,310 domestically and $1,851,434 overseas, totaling $9,351,744 worldwide.

=== Critical reception ===
The film received mixed reviews from critics. On Rotten Tomatoes, the film has a 35% score, based on 109 reviews, with an average rating of 5/10. The site's consensus states: "Despite some charms, overt emotional manipulation and an inconsistent tone prevents Martian Child from being the heartfelt dramedy it aspires to be." Metacritic reports a 48 out of 100 rating, based on 26 critics, indicating "mixed or average reviews". Audiences polled by CinemaScore gave the film an average grade of "B" on an A+ to F scale.

== Home media ==
Martian Child was released on DVD on February 12, 2008. It opened at #20 on the DVD sales chart, selling 69,000 units for revenue of $1.3 million. As per the latest figures, 400,000 DVD units have been sold, acquiring revenue of $7,613,945. This does not include DVD rentals/Blu-ray sales.

== Awards ==
Award	Category	Nominee	Result
29th Young Artist Awards	Best Family Feature Film		Nominated
29th Young Artist Awards	Best Performance by a Young Actor	Bobby Coleman	Nominated
