= What Happened to Monday =

2017 film by Tommy Wirkola

- Netflix release poster
- Directed by: Tommy Wirkola
- Written by: Max Botkin; Kerry Williamson
- Produced by: Raffaella De Laurentiis; Fabrice Gianfermi; Philippe Rousselet
- Starring: Noomi Rapace; Willem Dafoe; Marwan Kenzari; Glenn Close
- Cinematography: José David Montero
- Edited by: Martin Stoltz
- Music by: Christian Wibe
- Production companies: SND Films; Vendôme Pictures; Raffaella Productions; Title Media; Nexus Factory; Umedia; uFund
- Distributed by: SND Films (France); Netflix (United Kingdom/United States); Vendôme Pictures (Worldwide)
- Release dates: August 5, 2017 (Locarno Festival); August 18, 2017 (United States)
- Running time: 123 minutes
- Countries: United Kingdom; United States; France; Belgium
- Language: English
- Budget: $20 million
- Box office: $28 million

What Happened to Monday (known in several territories as Seven Sisters) is a 2017 science-fiction action film directed by Tommy Wirkola and written by Max Botkin and Kerry Williamson. The film stars Noomi Rapace, Glenn Close and Willem Dafoe.

What Happened to Monday was released theatrically in Europe and Asia, with Netflix distributing the film in the United States, United Kingdom, and Latin America on August 18, 2017. The film received mixed reviews from critics.

== Plot ==
In a dystopian 2073, overpopulation has resulted in a strict one-child policy, enforced by the European Federation's Child Allocation Bureau. Any illegal children found by the C.A.B. are taken and placed in indefinite cryosleep.

After the death of his daughter during childbirth, Terrence Settman secretly raises his identical septuplet granddaughters. To conceal their existence, he names each child after a day of the week and trains them to live a shared life under a single identity, "Karen Settman". Each sister is allowed to go outside only on the day corresponding to her name to ensure their secret remains undiscovered.

One night, Monday fails to return home after work. The next day, Tuesday retraces her steps and discovers Monday received the promotion they were up for and met their co-worker Jerry at a bar. Before she can investigate further, C.A.B. agents detain her.

At the C.A.B. facility, Tuesday meets presidential candidate and head of the bureau Nicolette Cayman. Cayman reveals she is aware of the sisters' existence and dispatches C.A.B. agents to their apartment to eliminate them. The sisters manage to kill the agents, but Sunday is killed in the process. Learning the agents used Tuesday's severed eyeball to bypass the building's retinal scan, the sisters suspect Jerry may have disclosed their secret.

The next day, Wednesday leaves without disguising herself and confronts Jerry. He reveals that "Karen" received the promotion after transferring millions of euros to Cayman to fund her campaign. After a C.A.B. sniper kills Jerry, Wednesday flees his apartment.

The sisters remotely guide Wednesday to safety but are interrupted when C.A.B. agent Adrian Knowles arrives at their apartment, concerned about "Karen". Surmising that Adrian is in a relationship with one of them, Thursday convinces Saturday to accompany Adrian. At his apartment, Saturday, a virgin, learns which sister Adrian had been seeing. She covertly links their bracelets while sleeping with him, allowing Friday to hack into the C.A.B. surveillance system; the sisters believe they have found Monday in a holding cell. Meanwhile, C.A.B. agents corner and kill Wednesday. After Adrian leaves his apartment, C.A.B. agents arrive and kill Saturday after she tells her siblings Monday was dating Adrian. The sisters' apartment is raided simultaneously by a C.A.B. squad led by Joe, the bureau's head of security. Admitting that she cannot survive on her own, Friday sacrifices herself by detonating their apartment to allow Thursday to escape and rescue Monday.

After learning about the attack, Adrian rushes back to the sisters' apartment, where Thursday confronts him in his car and blames him for her sisters’ deaths. Adrian insists that he knew nothing about the sisters' existence and that he loves 'Karen' without knowing her true name Monday, and agrees to help rescue her. He smuggles Thursday inside a body bag into the C.A.B. headquarters, where Thursday secretly records footage of a child undergoing cryosleep. However, instead of being preserved, the child is incinerated. Adrian and Thursday find Tuesday alive but missing an eye in a holding cell. They search for Monday, only to learn that she revealed their existence to Cayman.

At Cayman's campaign fundraiser, Thursday and Monday fight in a restroom, during which Thursday accidentally shoots Monday. Meanwhile, Tuesday and Adrian broadcast the footage of the incineration, shocking the attendees. As the panicked crowd turns on her, Cayman angrily confronts Thursday before her bodyguards restrain her. Monday then emerges from the restroom holding a gun; mistaking her intent to kill Thursday, Joe shoots her. Adrian, in turn, kills Joe.

As the crowd flees, Monday reveals to Thursday that she is pregnant and asks her not to let the C.A.B. take her unborn twins. Thursday realizes Monday betrayed her sisters in order to protect her children; Monday dies shortly after. The Child Allocation Act is abolished, and Cayman faces the death penalty for her actions.

Thursday, Adrian, and Tuesday watch Monday's and Adrian's twins develop in an artificial womb. With their individual identities no longer suppressed, Tuesday decides to rename herself Terri, while Thursday chooses to continue being Karen.

== Cast ==
- Noomi Rapace as Monday, Tuesday, Wednesday, Thursday, Friday, Saturday & Sunday Settman, the identical septuplet daughters of Karen Settman
  - Clara Read as Young Monday, Tuesday, Wednesday, Thursday, Friday, Saturday & Sunday Settman
- Willem Dafoe as Terrence Settman, the siblings' grandfather
- Glenn Close as Nicolette Cayman, the head of the Child Allocation Bureau (C.A.B.).
- Marwan Kenzari as Adrian Knowles, a C.A.B. security guard and love interest of Monday Settman
- Christian Rubeck as Joe, the C.A.B. chief of security
- Pål Sverre Hagen as Jerry, Karen's coworker
- Tomiwa Edun as Eddie, the septuplets' doorman
- Cassie Clare as Zaquia, Joe's main assistant
- Cameron Jack as Dutch
- Robert Wagner as Charles Benning

== Production ==
The film was originally written for a man, but director Tommy Wirkola had always wanted to work with Noomi Rapace. He pitched the idea of having a female as the protagonist to producer Raffaella De Laurentiis, who agreed to the idea. Wirkola was inspired by films such as Children of Men and Blade Runner due to their realism and world building. The film was shot in Romania over 94 days with a budget of $20 million.

== Release ==
What Happened to Monday premiered at the 2017 Locarno Festival. The streaming rights for the film were purchased by Netflix.

== Reception ==
Rotten Tomatoes, a review aggregator, reports that 61% of 36 surveyed critics gave the film a positive review, with an average rating of 5.9/10. Its critics' consensus says: "This high-concept sci-fi action thriller will make you stress-eat all the popcorn while Noomi Rapace (times seven) goes on a murderous spree to find out What Happened to Monday, but it may still leave you hungry in the end." According to Metacritic, which calculated a weighted average score of 47 out of 100 based on 12 critics, the film received "mixed or average reviews".

Jessica Kiang of Variety called it a "ludicrous, violent, amusingly dumb sci-fi actioner", remarking that although it is full of plot holes and Rapace's characters are thinly characterized, it is likely to become a cult film.

== See also ==
- Dayworld
- The Man Who Was Thursday: A Nightmare by G. K. Chesterton
