= Max Botkin =

American screenwriter and producer

- Born: Daniel Max Botkin; April 11, 1979 (age 47); Chicago, Illinois, U.S.
- Occupations: Television writer, screenwriter, film producer

Daniel Max Botkin (born April 11, 1979) is an American screenwriter and producer. He was born in Chicago, Illinois. Botkin's original script for What Happened to Monday? was featured on the 2010 Blacklist for best unproduced screenplays in Hollywood.

== Career ==
He began writing for TV with Wolverine and the X-Men. What Happened to Monday? was filmed by Tommy Wirkola and starred Noomi Rapace, Glenn Close, and Willem Dafoe. The film was released theatrically in France and Netflix bought the streaming rights to the film for the United States. He also wrote Robosapien: Rebooted (originally scheduled to be released in 2009, the film was released in the US on May 28, 2013) and Opposite Day.

In 2015, Botkin sold his original screenplay Ponce to Lionsgate/Pantelion and is executive producing, with Eugenio Derbez attached to star, produce and direct. In April 2017, Botkin signed a deal with 1stAvenueMachine to produce films with them through a directors incubator. In 2016, he co-wrote Show Dogs. The film was released in the United States on May 18, 2018, directed by Raja Gosnell.
