= Glass House: The Good Mother =

- Official DVD cover
- Directed by: Steve Antin
- Written by: Brett Merrymen
- Based on: The Glass House by Wesley Strick
- Produced by: Billy Pollina
- Starring: Angie Harmon; Jordan Hinson; Bobby Coleman; Joel Gretsch; Jason London
- Cinematography: Bobby Bukowski
- Edited by: Joan Sobel
- Music by: Steven Gutheinz
- Production companies: Destination Films; Shouldn't Throw Stones
- Distributed by: Sony Pictures Home Entertainment
- Release date: October 3, 2006
- Running time: 94 minutes
- Country: United States
- Language: English

Glass House: The Good Mother is a 2006 American direct-to-video psychological mystery thriller film starring Angie Harmon, Jordan Hinson, Joel Gretsch and Bobby Coleman. Although it shares no characters with the 2001 film The Glass House, it was marketed as a thematic sequel.

The movie depicts the condition known as Munchausen syndrome by proxy.

== Plot ==
Siblings Abby and Ethan Snow lose their parents in an accident and are adopted by Eve and Raymond Goode, two seemingly-ideal parents who have recently lost a child of their own, David. Initially, things seem good, but the first oddity manifests when Ethan gets his own room with a bathroom close to the master bedroom and Abby is given a bedroom far away, up in the tower of the house. From here, Abby notices a lot of strange things; there is a bed in the basement with David's name carved into the support post near it and there are many places they cannot enter, including David's old bedroom. They are not allowed to make phone calls either. Eve and Abby get into a fight at the dinner table, and Eve slaps Abby. Later on, Eve asks Abby to wash dishes. As Abby is washing them, she cuts her arm on broken glass that Eve purposely left in the sink for her. Abby demands to be taken to the hospital, but Eve refuses and brings out a box of medical supplies. Raymond reveals that Eve was a nurse, and Eve makes the process as painful as she possibly can, including a shot, and stitches without any anesthetic. Later, Abby is seen sleeping, and Eve injects her with an unknown substance. Abby awakes, too late to do anything, except ask what the liquid is. Eve responds with "This is for pain," to which Abby replies that she is not in pain, but Eve states "You will be." Abby falls back asleep, quickly and when she wakes up, Eve tells her that she's been in bed for three days.

Ethan soon becomes almost deathly ill, and Abby discovers that Eve is poisoning him, and that this has occurred to all the previous foster children who died in her care. Abby makes an attempt to escape, but Eve catches her and locks her in the attic. Their parents' friend, Ben Koch, comes over to the house to take the kids to Six Flags, but Raymond tells him that Eve took them to an art gallery. After a walk through the house Ben finds it very odd. Abby escapes through a window, then Eve comes after her. During this time the phone rings and Eve and Abby both race to answer it. Eve gets to it first, but the person on the other line hangs up. It is revealed that it was Ben, seeing if they really were gone.

After Abby tries to get away in the car again, she is stopped by Raymond, who Abby knocks out with a wrench. Ben arrives and enters the house, but is ambushed by Eve and drugged. Eve continues to chase Abby before luring her out of hiding via feigning talking to Ethan and catching her. She holds Abby over the railing, but Abby fights back and kicks Eve down the stairs. Eve takes a blow to the head at the bottom, appearing to be dead. Abby races to find Ethan, who she finds in a bathtub, nearly drowned. Abby pulls him out and Eve is standing behind her with a cleaver. She knocks Abby to the ground as Ben enters, and raises the cleaver. A shot is fired and Eve is killed, but it was not Ben who fired. It is revealed that Raymond fired the gun that killed his wife, having snapped out of his blind obedience caused by love. Raymond is arrested, and Abby and Ethan are taken to the hospital. The two presumably end up with Ben.

== Cast ==
- Angie Harmon as Eve Goode
- Joel Gretsch as Raymond Goode
- Jordan Hinson as Abby Snow
- Bobby Coleman as Ethan Snow
- Jason London as Ben Koch
- Tasha Smith as Caseworker Niecy Jameson
- Tim Cooney as Policeman
- Adam Tomei as Security Technician
- Robert Merrill as Paramedic
- Cyia Batten as Diane
