= Bobby Coleman =

American actor

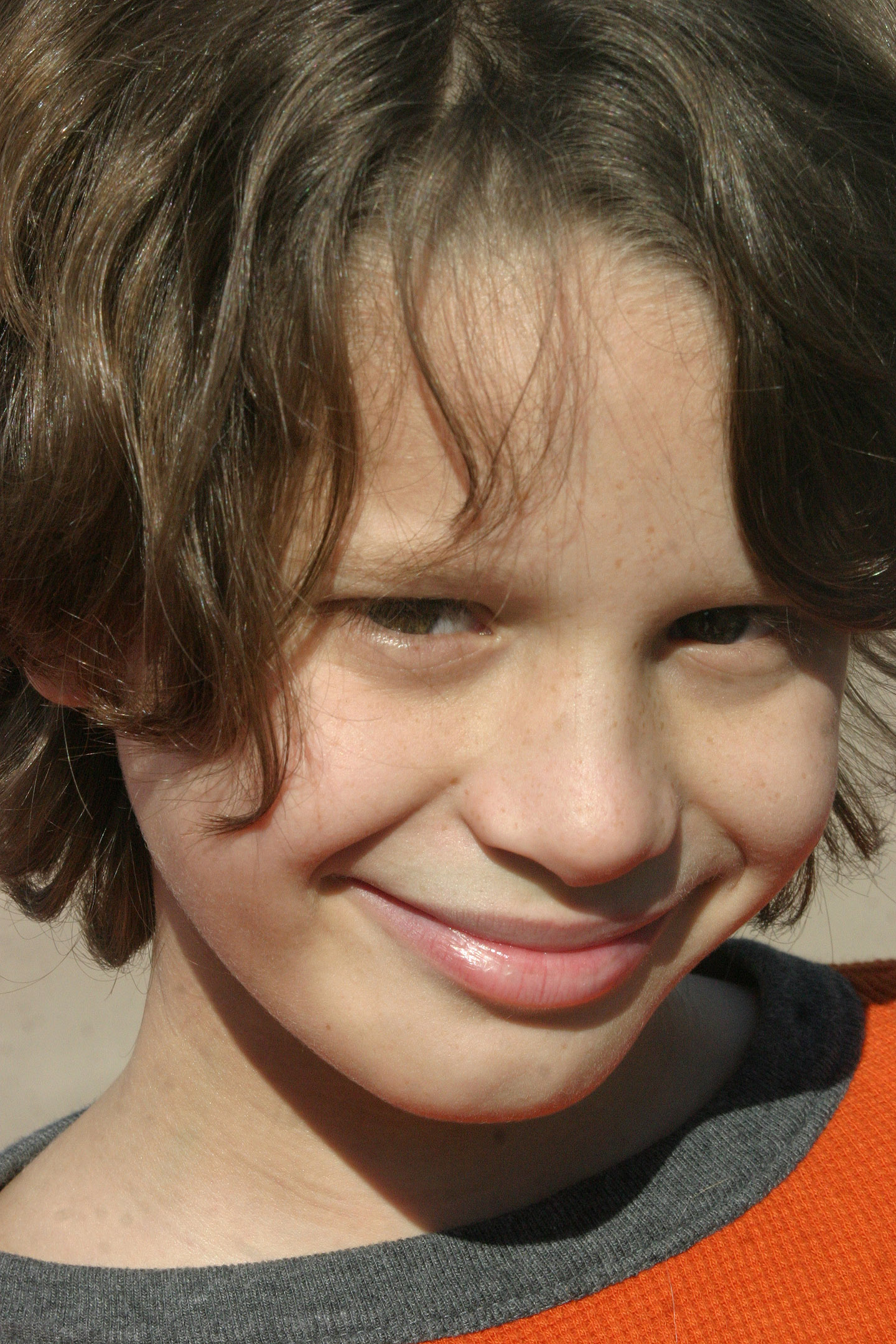
- Coleman in 2007
- Born: Robert Moorhouse Coleman III; May 5, 1997 (age 29); Los Angeles, California, U.S.
- Occupation: Actor
- Years active: 2002–2013, 2021–present
- Relatives: Holliston Coleman (sister)

Robert Moorhouse Coleman III (born May 5, 1997) is an American actor. He is best known for his roles as a child actor in the films Martian Child (2007), as the title character, and The Last Song (2010).

== Life and career ==
Bobby Coleman was born Robert Moorhouse Coleman III on May 5, 1997 in Los Angeles, California, the son of Doris (née Berg) and Robert Moorhouse Coleman Jr. He is the younger brother of actress Holliston Coleman.

Coleman began acting at the age of five, appearing in commercials before going on to work in film and television. He briefly appeared in television series Medium and JAG before moving into film roles. He appeared in the feature films Must Love Dogs and Friends with Money, and had a recurring role in the television series Surface. Coleman later appeared in leading roles in the films Glass House: The Good Mother and Take.

He played the title lead role in the film Martian Child, his second role alongside John Cusack. He and his real-life sister appeared together in the science-fiction adventure film, Robosapien: Rebooted. He appeared in the 2010 film The Last Song as Jonah Miller, the younger brother of Miley Cyrus's character.

== Filmography ==
| Year | Title | Role | Notes |
|---|---|---|---|
| 2003 | Dragnet | O'Malley's Son | "Daddy's Girl" |
| 2005 | Medium | 7 Year-Old Boy | "A Priest, a Doctor and a Medium Walk Into an Execution Chamber" |
| 2005 | JAG | Donovan Pardee | "Two Towns" |
| 2005 | Must Love Dogs | Austin Conner | |
| 2005 | Surface | Jesse Daughtery | Seven episodes |
| 2006 | Friends with Money | Marcus | |
| 2006 | Glass House: The Good Mother | Ethan Snow | |
| 2007 | Take | Jesse Nichols | |
| 2007 | Martian Child | Dennis / The Martian Child | Lead role |
| 2008 | Family Man | Mack Becker | TV series (pilot) |
| 2008 | In Plain Sight | Lonny McRoy / Leo Billups | "Hoosier Daddy" |
| 2008 | Proving Ground: From the Adventures of Captain Redlocks | Noah Stephenson | Unreleased |
| 2009 | Knight Rider | Danny Clark | "Fly by Knight" |
| 2009 | Post Grad | Hunter Malby | |
| 2010 | The Last Song | Jonah Miller | |
| 2010 | Snowmen | Billy Kirkfield | |
| 2010 | Private Practice | Oliver | "Second Choices" (season 3) |
| 2011 | R.L. Stine's The Haunting Hour | Jeffrey / Norman | "The Walls" as Jeffery "Swarmin' Norman'" as Norman |
| 2013 | Robosapien: Rebooted | Henry Keller | |
| 2021 | Joshua Bassett: Feel Something | Himself | Music video of the Joshua Bassett song, Feel Something |
| 2025 | The Rookie | Bradley | "The Kiss" (season 7) |

== Awards ==
2008 Young Artist Award
Best Performance in a Feature Film - Young Actor Age Ten or Younger for Martian Child — Nominated
