= Bless the Child =

2000 film by Chuck Russell

- Theatrical release poster
- Directed by: Chuck Russell
- Screenplay by: Tom Rickman; Clifford Green; Ellen Green
- Based on: Bless the Child by Cathy Cash Spellman
- Produced by: Mace Neufeld
- Starring: Kim Basinger; Jimmy Smits; Rufus Sewell; Ian Holm; Angela Bettis; Christina Ricci
- Cinematography: Peter Menzies Jr.
- Edited by: Alan Heim
- Music by: Christopher Young
- Production company: Icon Productions
- Distributed by: Paramount Pictures (United States); Advanced Film United International Pictures (Germany); Icon Productions (Overseas)
- Release date: August 11, 2000
- Running time: 108 minutes
- Countries: United States; Canada; Germany
- Language: English
- Budget: $65 million
- Box office: $40 million

Bless the Child
- Author: Cathy Cash Spellman
- Illustrator: Cathy Cash Spellman
- Language: English
- Genre: Horror
- Publisher: Cathy Cash Spellman
- Publication date: 1993
- Publication place: United States
- Media type: Wild Harp & Company Inc
- Pages: 536
- ISBN: 9780615517254

Bless the Child is a 2000 American supernatural horror film directed by Chuck Russell, and starring Kim Basinger, Jimmy Smits, Angela Bettis, Rufus Sewell, Christina Ricci, and Holliston Coleman. Based on the 1993 novel by Cathy Cash Spellman, it follows a woman who discovers that her niece, whom she has adopted, is being sought by a Satanic cult seeking to use her supernatural abilities. The film is a co-production between the United States, Canada and Germany.

Filmed in Toronto in late 1999, Bless the Child was released theatrically in North America on August 11, 2000, to overwhelmingly negative critical reviews, and was a box-office bomb.

== Plot ==
Maggie O'Connor, a psychiatric nurse in New York City, adopts her newborn niece, Cody, from her sister Jenna, a homeless heroin addict who abandoned her at Maggie's house just before Christmas. Maggie raises Cody herself, and during her formative years, Cody exhibits signs of autism, though Maggie is suspicious of the diagnosis. Maggie enrolls Cody in a special-needs Catholic school in Brooklyn, where the nuns notice Cody displaying possible telekinetic abilities.

Meanwhile, a series of child kidnappings and murders are plaguing the city, investigated by FBI Special Agent John Travis, a former seminary student. The bodies bear occult brandings, and the victims all share Cody's birthdate and age. At her hospital, Maggie meets Cheri, a young heroin addict bearing a mysterious Luciferian tattoo, who knows Jenna. In conversation, Cheri implies that Cody is special, and urges Maggie to protect her. When Maggie and Cody stop in a church, Maggie is startled when all of the votive candles light themselves in Cody's presence.

When Maggie returns home, she is surprised to find Jenna, now clean and sober, there with her new husband, Eric Stark, a famous self-help guru, attempting to take Cody. Maggie refuses, but they manage to covertly kidnap Cody. Maggie reports it to police, and Agent Travis takes an interest in the case. Maggie attempts to learn more about Eric's organization, the New Dawn Foundation, by visiting one of their centers. Cheri subsequently contacts Maggie, and explains she was previously a member of New Dawn, which is actually a front for a Luciferian cult, spearheaded by Eric. She says that the cult recently began kidnapping six-year-old children and subjecting them to tests; those who failed were murdered in what Cheri describes as the "slaughter of the innocents". Cheri claims that Cody is destined to become a saint who will lead people to God, which Eric is attempting to thwart.

A group of cult members pursue Cheri after she provides Maggie Eric's address, and decapitate her in the subway. Maggie visits the address, located in a rundown building in Queens, and finds Eric, Jenna, and Cody there. Maggie holds Eric at gunpoint, but is chloroformed by his henchman, Stuart. She regains consciousness in the driver's seat of a car, crashing into the side of a bridge. She is helped by a mysterious stranger moments before the car falls into the river. Meanwhile, Eric attempts to force Cody to watch as he convinces a vagrant to commit suicide by self-immolation. However, Cody thwarts this by blowing out the match, assuring the man he has not been forsaken. After, Eric angrily burns the man alive. Jenna, meanwhile, is kept sedated with heroin.

Maggie tracks Cody, who is being cared for by a nanny and member of the cult, Dahnya, and kidnaps Cody while she is visiting an orthodontist. Another mysterious stranger, this time female, helps them catch a subway train by holding the door open. At the urging of a Jesuit priest, Maggie leaves with Cody en route to Sister Rosa's convent in Vermont, but the cultists stalk them and manage to kidnap Cody. Maggie phones Agent Travis, who agrees to help her, tracking the cultists to a palatial estate owned by Eric. Maggie and Travis break into the home, but are assailed by cultists, who beat Travis. Maggie flees into the woods and reaches an abandoned church where the cult is preparing for a Black Mass. Meanwhile, the nuns at Sister Rosa's convent, worried over Maggie's failure to arrive with Cody, pray en masse for their wellbeing. Maggie stabs Eric, who then shoots her as she attempts to save Cody. Three orbs of light suddenly appear in the church as the cultists watch in terror, and Maggie's bullet wounds mysteriously heal. Police raid the church; Travis kills Eric, and watches as the orbs of light disperse.

Some time later, Jenna is in rehab and has asked Maggie to legally adopt Cody. While Maggie, Travis, and Cody walk to mass, another cultist stalks Cody, planning to stab her. Framed by statues of sword-bearing angels, she turns to stare at him. He stops, awestruck, drops the knife and flees.

== Cast ==
- Kim Basinger as Maggie O'Connor
- Angela Bettis as Jenna O'Connor
- Rufus Sewell as Eric Stark
- Christina Ricci as Cheri Post
- Holliston Coleman as Cody O'Connor
- Jimmy Smits as FBI Agent John Travis
- Michael Gaston as Detective Frank Bugatti
- Lumi Cavazos as Sister Rosa
- Eugene Lipinski as Stuart
- Ian Holm as Reverend Grissom
- Dimitra Arliss as Dahnya
- Helen Stenborg as Joseph
- Anne Betancourt as María

== Production ==
Filming took place in the summer and fall of 1999 in Toronto, Ontario, which doubled for the film's New York City setting.

== Release ==
=== Home media ===
Paramount Home Entertainment released Bless the Child on DVD on February 13, 2001. Scream Factory announced a Blu-ray edition of the film scheduled for release on April 11, 2023.

== Reception ==
=== Box office ===
The film was released in North America on August 11, 2000, opening at #7 at box office and earning $9.4 million in its opening weekend. In the United Kingdom, the film premiered on January 5, 2001. It went on to gross only $40.4 million worldwide, below its $65 million budget.

=== Critical response ===
Bless the Child received almost universally negative reviews from critics.

Robert Koehler of Variety was critical of the plot and production values, and wrote: "Combines the most rudimentary of Catholic-inspired good vs. evil plots with visual effects that would barely pass muster in episodic TV." Kevin Thomas of the Los Angeles Times said the film "opens strongly" but soon "lapses into an exercise in foolishness." Rita Kempley of The Washington Post wrote: "The scariest thing about this hokey bombast is that it got made in the first place." Elvis Mitchell of The New York Times called it "A supernatural soap opera." Vicky Edwards of the Chicago Tribune gave it a mixed review, calling it "Entertaining, but it doesn't add enough to the genre to make it truly blessed."

The Hartford Courant's review remarked the film's lack of suspense but praised the performances, particularly Basinger's and Ricci's, though they were critical of Smits's performance, comparing it negatively against his role in The Believers (1987), a film with similar themes.

Film critic Bruce Kirkland felt that Bless the Child was mocking Scientology in the guise of the fictional cult "The New Dawn".

Rotten Tomatoes gave the film a 4% rating based on reviews from 113 critics. The site's consensus states: "Bless the Child squanders its talented cast on a plot that's more likely to inspire unintentional laughs than shivers." It is ranked #64 on their list of the 100 worst films of all time. On Metacritic it has a score of 17 indicating "overwhelming dislike". Audiences polled by CinemaScore gave the film an average grade of "B" on an A+ to F scale.

=== Accolades ===
The film was nominated for one Razzie Award, Worst Actress for Kim Basinger, along with I Dreamed of Africa, but lost to Madonna for The Next Best Thing.
