= Show Dogs =

- American theatrical release poster
- Directed by: Raja Gosnell
- Written by: Max Botkin; Marc Hyman
- Produced by: Deepak Nayar; Philip von Alvensleben
- Starring: Will Arnett; Chris "Ludacris" Bridges; Natasha Lyonne; Jordin Sparks; Gabriel Iglesias; Shaquille O'Neal; Omar Chaparro; Stanley Tucci
- Cinematography: David Mackie
- Edited by: David Freeman; Sabrina Plisco
- Music by: Heitor Pereira
- Production companies: Global Road Entertainment; Riverstone Pictures; Kintop Pictures; Wales Screen; LipSync; Alive Entertainment
- Distributed by: Global Road Entertainment (United States); Entertainment One (United Kingdom); FilmNation Entertainment (international)
- Release dates: May 10, 2018 (EMEA); May 18, 2018 (United States); May 25, 2018 (United Kingdom)
- Running time: 96 minutes (theatrical exclusive); 91 minutes
- Countries: United Kingdom; United States
- Language: English
- Budget: $5.5 million
- Box office: $40 million

Show Dogs is a 2018 buddy cop comedy film directed by Raja Gosnell and written by Max Botkin and Marc Hyman. It stars Will Arnett, Chris "Ludacris" Bridges, Natasha Lyonne, Jordin Sparks, Gabriel Iglesias, Shaquille O'Neal, Omar Chaparro, and Stanley Tucci. The film follows a Rottweiler police dog and his human partner who go undercover at a prestigious dog show to stop an animal smuggling activity. The film was released in the United States on May 18, 2018, to negative reviews from critics.

A week after its release, the film came under fire when several critics and parents' groups accused it of including a scene normalizing child grooming. The studio apologized and recut the film, re-releasing it on its second weekend in theaters. The film grossed $40 million against its $5.5 million budget.

== Plot ==
Max, a macho Rottweiler K-9 police dog, attempts to rescue Ling-Li, a baby giant panda, from being sold by an animal smuggling ring but inadvertently foils an FBI sting operation involving his human partner Frank, who blames Max for letting the criminals escape. The two enemies must now work together and pose as a show dog and his trainer at the Canini Invitational dog show in Las Vegas to stop the animal smuggling ring.

== Cast ==
- Will Arnett as Frank Nicholas
- Natasha Lyonne as Mattie
- Omar Chaparro as Señor Gabriel
- Andy Beckwith as Berne
- Oliver Tompsett as Chauncey
- Simon Lipkin as Captured Smuggler
- Kerry Shale as Thin Man
- Colin Stinton as NYPD Chief
- Lachele Carl as FBI Director
- Khali Best as Dog Pound Attendant
- Bradley Gosnell as Stage Manager
- Zachery Lou Wilson as Caesars Security Guard
- Ronni Ancona as Poopsie Chow’s Owner
- Melanie Ebanks as Animal Control Officer
- Lysander Abadia as Hallway Dog's Owner
- Christina Dohmen as Cupcake Chef
- Ben Kerr as NYPD Cop
- Renee Castle as News Anchor
- Flaminia Cinque as Spa Manager
- Sean Alexander as Magician
- Madeleine Woolner as Perfumier
- Patsy Hollings, Steve Rose, Carol Durrant, Alex Paisey and Lynda Race as Canini Judges
- Beth Richardson and Shannon Sangiorgio as Philippe’s Selfie Fans

=== Voices ===
- Ludacris as Max, a Rottweiler
- Jordin Sparks as Daisy, an Australian Shepherd
- RuPaul as Persephone, a Xoloitzcuintle
- Gabriel Iglesias as Sprinkles, a Pug
- Shaquille O'Neal as Karma, a Komondor
- Stanley Tucci as Philippe, a Papillon
- Alan Cumming as Dante, a Yorkshire Terrier
- Anders Holm, Blake Anderson, and Kate Micucci as Pigeons
- Kerry Shale as Sarge, Luther, Deepak the Tiger, Chicago Rottweiler, Backstage Dogs
- Bradley Gosnell as Caesars Announcer, Rottweiler, Male Labrador Retriever, King Poodle, Agility Dogs, Backstage Dogs
- Delaney Milbourn as Sparky, Ling Li, Mama Rottweiler, Afghan, Female Labrador, Cannonball Terrier, Cowabunga Dog, Backstage Dogs
- Stephen Hogan as Bullmastiff, Canini Announcer
- Andrew Ortenberg as Agility dogs, Backstage Dogs

== Production ==
Show Dogs began filming on November 28, 2016, at Pinewood Studio Wales in Great Britain, with additional scenes filmed on location in Las Vegas.

== Release ==
Show Dogs was released in the United States on May 18, 2018. The film was later released on DVD and Blu-ray in the United States on August 21, 2018.

== Reception ==
=== Box office ===
Show Dogs grossed $17.7 million in the United States and Canada, and $22.3 million in other territories, for a worldwide total of $40 million.

In the United States and Canada, Show Dogs was released on May 18, 2018, alongside Deadpool 2 and Book Club, and was projected to gross $7–9 million from 3,145 theaters in its opening weekend. It ended up debuting to $6 million, finishing sixth at the box office. It dropped 49% in its second weekend to $3.1 million, finishing seventh.

=== Critical response ===
On review aggregation website Rotten Tomatoes, the film holds an approval rating of 16% based on 63 reviews and an average rating of 3.3/10. The website's critical consensus reads, "Show Dogs may entertain very young viewers, but for anyone else, it threatens the cinematic equivalent of a rolled-up newspaper on the snout." On Metacritic, the film has a weighted average score of 31 out of 100, based on reviews from 14 critics, indicating "generally unfavorable reviews". Audiences polled by CinemaScore gave the film an average grade of "A−" on an A+ to F scale.

Christy Lemire of RogerEbert.com gave the film 0.5 out of four stars and said that from "the barely-there characters to the cheesy visual effects to the flat attempts at knowingly corny laughs, this reeks of the kind of material you'd have the misfortune of discovering in the bargain bin under the merciless fluorescent lights of your local soulless superstore. It is bleak indeed. Your family deserves better."

Peter Hartlaub of the San Francisco Chronicle gave the film zero out of four stars and strongly criticized (among other things) the production, jokes, and pacing; ultimately concluding that "Show Dogs is really bad, even for a talking-dog movie" and that "we all deserve a better live-action talking-dog movie than this."

British film critic Mark Kermode also panned the film in his review and later declared it the worst film of 2018.

In contrast, Michael Rechtshaffen of The Hollywood Reporter wrote: "...thanks to some creative character casting and a self-aware script that isn't averse to poking fun at itself, Show Dogs emerges as a high-concept family comedy that manages to avoid being taken for the runt of the litter, even if it doesn't really bring anything fresh and different to the arena."

=== Accolades ===
List of awards and nominations
Year	Award	Category	Recipient(s)	Result	Ref(s)
2018	People's Choice Awards	Favorite Family Movie	Show Dogs	Shortlisted	
2019	Golden Raspberry Awards	Worst Supporting Actor	Chris "Ludacris" Bridges (voice only)	Nominated	

=== Child grooming controversy and resulting re-cut ===
The movie's solution to Max's discomfort with the inspection is not to empower him to escape it somehow; it's to have him learn to check out mentally while he endures it, and to make no outward sign of his humiliation. It is not paranoid to say that this is a bad message for kids.

— Ruth Graham

The film was criticized for normalizing child grooming based on a plot point that depicts the canine main character being forced to have his genitals fondled by a dog show judge without consent. In the film, other characters "teach" him not to think about it and to go to his "happy place" when that happens. Initially, in a test screening for the film, online magazine Macaroni Kid's Terina Maldonado said "With the #MeToo movement and all the talk of sexual predators in Hollywood, I couldn't help but think this message, that is blatantly in the open for adults to see, but over a child's understanding, is meant to groom children to be open to having people touch their privates, even though they don't want it."

Spurred on by this review, other professional reviewers agreed that the child grooming implications were "disturbing and serious". Bob Hoose of Focus on the Family's entertainment guide "Plugged in" described the content in his review but did not ascribe motive, although he did not disagree with Maldonado's interpretation. Slate's Ruth Graham said that the genital fondling subplot was "darker" than the light-hearted humor in the rest of the film.

The British Board of Film Classification took a different perspective, writing in its annual report, "Before the film started its UK release, some members of the public, who had not yet seen it but who had read blog posts from the US suggesting that these scenes might reduce the resistance of children to adults touching them inappropriately, expressed concerns. However, the scene in question is light, comic and entirely non-sexual, if a little rude. Our view is that the US allegations were a misinterpretation of the scene in question."

In response to these concerns, the film's co-writer Max Botkin stated that he did not write those scenes and that the original script was "heavily rewritten by 13 other writers", going on to strongly condemn the themes in question. Additionally, the film's distributor Global Road Entertainment announced they were re-cutting the film and resubmitting it to theaters in time for its second weekend, stating the following to Deadline Hollywood:

Responding to concerns raised by moviegoers and some specific organizations, Global Road Entertainment has decided to remove two scenes from the film Show Dogs that some have deemed not appropriate for children. The company takes these matters very seriously and remains committed to providing quality entertainment for the intended audiences based on the film’s rating. We apologize to anybody who feels the original version of Show Dogs sent an inappropriate message. The revised version of the film will be available for viewing nationwide starting this weekend.

The National Center on Sexual Exploitation, formerly Morality in Media, still objected to the edited version of the film, writing that it retains many of the controversial genital-touching scenes and thus strongly advising parents and caregivers to avoid taking children to it.
