= The Martian Child =

1994 novelette and 2002 novel by David Gerrold

- Author: David Gerrold
- Language: English
- Genre: Science fiction
- Published: Short: 1994; Novel: 2002
- Publication place: United States

"The Martian Child" is a novelette by American writer David Gerrold, originally published in Fantasy & Science Fiction. It won the 1995 Hugo Award for Best Novelette, Locus Award and HOMer Award and the 1994 Nebula Award for Best Novelette and was nominated for the Theodore Sturgeon award for best short fiction. The novelette was expanded into a novel and made into an eponymous film.

== Plot ==
A single man who writes science fiction books and screenplays for a living, adopts a son who claims he is from Mars. The adoptive father comes to be intrigued by the possibility his son might really be a Martian. Ultimately, the father realizes that he loves his son whether or not he is a Martian. The son uses a magical "Martian wish" to be a human so he can remain with his father.

== Background ==
The story is based on the author's own experiences as a single adoptive parent, with most of the key moments drawn from actual events.

The main difference between the story and Gerrold's own experience is that Gerrold's son, Sean Friedman, never actually believed he was a Martian; the Martian identity was simply a game that the two of them played. The initial idea for the story actually came from the author overhearing another adoptive parent remark that her daughter had told her teacher that she [the adoptive daughter] was really a Martian. Although nothing specifically science fictional occurs in the story, Gerrold makes suggestive hints.

David Gerrold was out about his homosexuality when he adopted his son. In the novelette, the sexuality of the protagonist is not disclosed although the novel identifies him as gay. In the feature film, the protagonist was a straight widower (with a female love interest), causing criticism from the LGBT community.
