= Robosapien: Rebooted =

- Theatrical release poster
- Directed by: Sean McNamara
- Written by: Max Botkin
- Based on: Robosapien by WowWee
- Produced by: Avi Arad; Steven Paul
- Starring: Bobby Coleman; Holliston Coleman; Penelope Ann Miller; David Eigenberg
- Cinematography: Christian Sebaldt
- Edited by: Jeff Canavan
- Music by: John Coda
- Production companies: Arc Productions; Arad Productions; Crystal Sky Pictures; Brookwell McNamara Entertainment
- Distributed by: TVA Films (Canada); Anchor Bay Films (US)
- Release date: May 28, 2013
- Running time: 86 minutes
- Countries: Canada; United States
- Language: English
- Budget: $15 million
- Box office: $290,502

Robosapien: Rebooted (also known as Cody the Robosapien) is a 2013 science fiction family comedy film starring Bobby Coleman, Holliston Coleman, Penelope Ann Miller, David Eigenberg, Joaquim de Almeida, Kim Coates, Jae Head and Peter Jason, produced by Arad Productions Inc., Arc Productions, Crystal Sky Pictures and Brookwell McNamara Entertainment and distributed by Anchor Bay Films and TVA Films. It is based on the toy Robosapien.

Produced by Avi Arad and Steven Paul, written by Max Botkin from a story by Arad and directed by Sean McNamara with music by John Coda, the film is about a young boy who befriends a robot. The film was theatrically released on May 28, 2013, by Anchor Bay Films and TVA Films.

== Plot ==
Allan Topher, an inventor at the advanced technology company Kinetech Labs, develops a highly sophisticated robot intended for search and rescue missions. However, upon discovering that his creation is to be repurposed for military use, Allan reprograms the robot to escape the facility. During its escape, the robot is damaged and later found by 12-year-old Henry Keller, who repairs it and names it Cody. With no memory of its origins, Cody forms a close bond with Henry.

As their friendship grows, Cody begins to regain fragments of his memory. When he fully recalls his past, Henry makes the difficult decision to return Cody to his creator. Feeling remorseful for separating them, Allan eventually returns Cody to Henry. During this time, Allan also forms a connection with Henry’s mother, Joanna.

Meanwhile, Kinetech intensifies its efforts to recover the robot. They locate and confront Cody and Henry, prompting Cody to activate a hidden flight function to escape with Henry. They reunite with Henry's sister, Meagan, but soon discover that Kinetech has kidnapped their mother and Allan in an attempt to lure Cody back.

Determined to rescue their loved ones and stop Kinetech’s dangerous plans, Henry, Meagan, and Cody set out on a mission to confront the corporation, rescue Joanna and Allan, and prevent the misuse of Cody’s technology.

== Cast ==
The film's cast includes:

- Bobby Coleman as Henry Keller
- Holliston Coleman as Meagan Keller, Henry's sister
- Penelope Ann Miller as Joanna Keller, Henry's mother
- David Eigenberg as Allan Topher, Cody's father/Robosapien's creator
- Joaquim de Almeida as Esperenza
- Kim Coates as Niles Porter, Allan's boss
- Buddy Lewis as Charles
- Jae Head as Cody/Robosapien (voice)
- Peter Jason as Rear Admiral Victor
- Billy Slaughter as James
- Robbie Harrison as Warren
- Erin Woods as Jenna

== Production ==
In March 2007, WowWee, the company that makes the toy RoboSapien, announced that it planned to produce a feature film about the toy that would combine live-action and computer-generated elements. WowWee entered a partnership with Arad Productions, run by producer Avi Arad, who was interested in Robosapien since the toy debuted. Time reported the planned film as part of a growing trend to make films based on toys, citing the 2007 releases Transformers and Bratz: The Movie. Arad took an active role in developing the lead character for the film. He worked very closely with Art Director Shane Nakamura and the design team at WowWee.

In August 2008, feature film rights were officially sold by WowWee to producer duo Arad and Steven Paul, the latter producing films under Crystal Sky Pictures. The film was revealed to be titled Robosapien: Rebooted, and in the negotiation, WowWee reserved the worldwide right to market toys related to the film and to receive a portion of returns for other merchandise related to the film. Sean McNamara was hired to direct the film. Filming took place in New Orleans in 2008 from March 24-April 25. The city was chosen because Arad became familiar with it when he attended National Association of Television Program Executives conventions there in the 1980s and 1990s. He also chose the city to take advantage of tax breaks and its scenery; the story was also rewritten so it would recognizably take place in New Orleans. In September 2010, Arc Productions (formerly Starz Animation) joined the project with Crystal Sky and Arad Productions.

== Release ==
Robosapien: Rebooted was originally scheduled to be released in 2009. The film was released in the US on May 28, 2013. A Facebook page and new trailer were posted online in early April 2013. In England, where the toy was a huge success, it wasn't released until July 28, 2014, as an ASDA exclusive DVD.

== Reception ==
=== Box office ===
Robosapien: Rebooted has a box office total of $290,502; $288,055 during its initial release and $2,447 during a 2015 rerelease. The top grossing countries were Mexico ($191,504), Peru ($54,817) and Singapore ($36,178).

== See also ==
- RoboSapien
