= Opposite Day (film) =

- Theatrical release poster
- Directed by: R. Michael Givens
- Written by: Max Botkin
- Produced by: Jamee Natella; Steven Paul
- Starring: Pauly Shore; Dick Van Patten; George Wendt; Billy Unger; Ariel Winter; Dylan Cash; Kristen Combs; Nadji Jeter; Colleen Crabtree; Renée Taylor; French Stewart
- Cinematography: R. Michael Givens
- Edited by: Jonathan Cates
- Music by: Misha Segal
- Production company: Crystal Sky Pictures
- Distributed by: Anchor Bay Entertainment; TVA Films
- Release dates: September 4, 2009 (Canada); November 7, 2009 (United States)
- Running time: 88 minutes
- Country: United States
- Language: English
- Budget: $1 million

Opposite Day is a 2009 American science fiction comedy film starring Billy Unger, Ariel Winter, Pauly Shore, and French Stewart, written by Max Botkin. It was released in November 7, 2009.

== Plot ==
The movie opens as young Samuel Benson (Billy Unger) gets embarrassed that parents are making rules; he starts to wish that kids ruled the world. Sammy is told by his grandmother (Renée Taylor) before sleep that he can wish to a wishing star, so he wishes one wish: "I wish that kids rule the world." But when Sammy and his sister find a surprising secret, the whole world has changed. All adults act like young children, and children become the important people of the world. Businesses, restaurants, gardens, stations and all other jobs are run by kids. So now it is up to Samuel and his sister Carla to figure out how to change the world back. Toddlers are acting like old people. Then Jack Benson (Dick Van Patten), Sammy's grandfather, accidentally runs into a stop sign, he sees a little kid in an officer costume and he gets confused. So Sammy's and Carla's grandparents get arrested and Sammy understands not to make that wish again. So they find their parents acting like children. The next day, Carla's best friend Sue calls her at her house where Carla did not know she had a presentation which almost got her mother fired. She performs very well on the presentation. While Sammy sends the children to school, he went to the laboratory where Chaz has an evil plan to mystify the whole world where Carla and Sammy work together to stop him and they convince him not to do that and they change the world back to normal. Sammy and Carla go on a family vacation where their grandparents are still arrested.

== Cast ==
- Billy Unger as Samuel "Sammy" Benson, a nine-year-old boy with a crazy wish that can change the world forever. Ignoring his sister's advice, he makes his wish come true.
- Ariel Winter as Carla Benson, Sammy's eight-year-old sister. She is always looking up to her brother Sammy. Even though Sammy always gets her into trouble, Carla loves him.
- Dylan Cash as Chaz Larrabee, Sammy's best friend and the son of Dr. Godfrey Larrabee who wants kids to rule the world forever but is stopped by Carla. He is the main antagonist of the film.
- Pauly Shore as Robert Benson, Sammy and Carla's father
- Dick Van Patten as Jack Benson, Sammy and Carla's grandfather
- George Wendt as Corporate Executive
- Kristen Combs as Sue, Carla's best friend, the one who forced her to do a presentation for her client
- Nadji Jeter as Jasper, Sammy's best friend, who also works in a police station
- Colleen Crabtree as Denise Benson, Sammy and Carla's mother
- Renée Taylor as Martha Benson, Sammy and Carla's grandmother
- French Stewart as the seemingly mad scientist, Dr. Godfrey Larrabee
- Bradley Steven Perry as Security Guard
- Bridger Palmer as Security Guard
- Rico Rodriguez as Janitor
- Atticus Shaffer as Detective
- Will Shadley as Security Guard # 3

== Release ==
Opposite Day was released in November 7, 2009, and was directed by R. Michael Givens and written by Max Botkin. Its estimated budget is $1 million.
