= List of Ally McBeal episodes =

Ally McBeal is a comedy-drama television series created by David E. Kelley, premiered on September 8, 1997 on Fox network in the United States and ended on May 20, 2002. The show spans five seasons, consisting, in total, of 112 episodes. The episodes were approximately 45 minutes long, excluding commercials.

All seasons of Ally McBeal were released on DVD in the region 2 in 2002 and 2003, respectively. Until fall 2009, only several episodes of the first season of Ally McBeal were available in the United States, due to music rights issues. On October 6, 2009, Fox released a 6-disc set of all 23 season-one episodes, with their original music.

Ally McBeal follows an eccentric lawyer, Allison Marie "Ally" McBeal, and her group of friends from work, focusing on their personal and romantic lives, as well as their business cases which would often contrast or reinforce a character's drama. The series starred Calista Flockhart as Ally, Greg Germann as Richard Fish, Jane Krakowski as Elaine Vassal, Peter MacNicol as John Cage, Lisa Nicole Carson as Renée Raddick, Portia de Rossi as Nelle Porter, Lucy Liu as Ling Woo, Gil Bellows as Billy Thomas, Courtney Thorne-Smith as Georgia Thomas, Vonda Shepard as herself, Robert Downey Jr. as Larry Paul, and many others.

== Series overview ==
Season	Episodes	Originally released		Rank	Rating
Season	Episodes	First released	Last released	Rank	Rating
1	23	September 8, 1997	May 18, 1998	57	8.1
2	23	September 14, 1998	May 24, 1999	23	9.6
3	21	October 25, 1999	May 22, 2000	39	8.5
4	23	October 23, 2000	May 21, 2001	—N/a	—N/a
5	22	October 29, 2001	May 20, 2002	—N/a	—N/a

== Episodes ==
=== Season 1 (1997–98) ===
No. overall	No. in season	Title	Directed by	Written by	Original release date	Prod. code	Viewers (millions)
1	1	"Pilot"	James Frawley	David E. Kelley	September 8, 1997	AM00	9.90
2	2	"Compromising Positions"	Jonathan Pontell	David E. Kelley	September 15, 1997	AM01	8.78
3	3	"The Kiss"	Dennie Gordon	David E. Kelley	September 22, 1997	AM02	8.35
4	4	"The Affair"	Arlene Sanford	David E. Kelley	September 29, 1997	AM03	8.93
5	5	"One Hundred Tears Away"	Sandy Smolan	David E. Kelley	October 20, 1997	AM04	9.13
6	6	"The Promise"	Victoria Hochberg	David E. Kelley	October 27, 1997	AM05	8.49
7	7	"The Attitude"	Michael Schultz	David E. Kelley	November 3, 1997	AM06	9.77
8	8	"Drawing the Lines"	Mel Damski	David E. Kelley	November 10, 1997	AM07	10.36
9	9	"The Dirty Joke"	Dan Attias	David E. Kelley	November 17, 1997	AM08	10.59
10	10	"Boy to the World"	Thomas Schlamme	David E. Kelley	December 1, 1997	AM09	9.63
11	11	"Silver Bells"	Joe Napolitano	David E. Kelley	December 15, 1997	AM10	8.83
12	12	"Cro-Magnon"	Allan Arkush	David E. Kelley	January 5, 1998	AM11	13.47
13	13	"The Blame Game"	Sandy Smolan	David E. Kelley	January 19, 1998	AM12	14.26
14	14	"Body Language"	Mel Damski	David E. Kelley & Nicole Yorkin & Dawn Prestwich	February 2, 1998	AM13	13.62
15	15	"Once in a Lifetime"	Elodie Keene	Story by : David E. Kelley & Jeff Pinkner; Teleplay by : David E. Kelley	February 23, 1998	AM14	12.55
16	16	"Forbidden Fruits"	Jeremy Kagan	David E. Kelley	March 2, 1998	AM15	14.25
17	17	"Theme of Life"	Dennie Gordon	David E. Kelley	March 9, 1998	AM16	15.69
18	18	"The Playing Field"	Jonathan Pontell	David E. Kelley	March 16, 1998	AM17	15.42
19	19	"Happy Birthday Baby"	Thomas Schlamme	David E. Kelley	April 6, 1998	AM18	13.67
20	20	"The Inmates"	Michael Schultz	David E. Kelley	April 27, 1998	AM19	12.68
21	21	"Being There"	Mel Damski	David E. Kelley	May 4, 1998	AM20	14.86
22	22	"Alone Again"	Dennis Dugan	David E. Kelley	May 11, 1998	AM21	14.07
23	23	"These Are the Days"	Jonathan Pontell	David E. Kelley	May 18, 1998	AM22	14.35

=== Season 2 (1998–99) ===
No. overall	No. in season	Title	Directed by	Written by	Original release date	Prod. code	Viewers (millions)
24	1	"The Real World"	Jonathan Pontell	David E. Kelley	September 14, 1998	2M01	14.82
25	2	"They Eat Horses, Don't They?"	Mel Damski	David E. Kelley	September 21, 1998	2M02	13.25
26	3	"Fool's Night Out"	Peter MacNicol	David E. Kelley	September 28, 1998	2M03	15.03
27	4	"It's My Party"	Jace Alexander	David E. Kelley	October 19, 1998	2M04	14.49
28	5	"The Story of Love"	Tom Moore	David E. Kelley	October 26, 1998	2M05	13.85
29	6	"World's Without Love"	Arvin Brown	David E. Kelley	November 2, 1998	2M07	14.48
30	7	"Happy Trails"	Jonathan Pontell	David E. Kelley	November 9, 1998	2M08	14.85
31	8	"Just Looking"	Vincent Misiano	David E. Kelley & Shelly Landau	November 16, 1998	2M09	14.57
32	9	"You Never Can Tell"	Adam Nimoy	David E. Kelley	November 23, 1998	2M06	15.31
33	10	"Making Spirits Bright"	Peter MacNicol	David E. Kelley	December 14, 1998	2M10	15.08
34	11	"In Dreams"	Alex Graves	David E. Kelley	January 11, 1999	2M11	15.36
35	12	"Love Unlimited"	Dennie Gordon	David E. Kelley	January 18, 1999	2M12	16.72
36	13	"Angels and Blimps"	Mel Damski	David E. Kelley	February 8, 1999	2M13	14.75
37	14	"Pyramids on the Nile"	Elodie Keene	David E. Kelley	February 15, 1999	2M14	15.13
38	15	"Sideshow"	Alex Graves	David E. Kelley	February 22, 1999	2M15	16.94
39	16	"Sex, Lies, and Politics"	Arlene Sanford	David E. Kelley	March 1, 1999	2M16	16.01
40	17	"Civil Wars"	Billy Dickson	David E. Kelley	April 5, 1999	2M17	14.25
41	18	"Those Lips, that Hand"	Arlene Sanford	David E. Kelley	April 19, 1999	2M18	15.19
42	19	"Let's Dance"	Ben Lewin	David E. Kelley	April 26, 1999	2M19	15.96
43	20	"Only the Lonely"	Vincent Misiano	David E. Kelley	May 3, 1999	2M20	13.26
44	21	"The Green Monster"	Michael Schultz	David E. Kelley	May 10, 1999	2M21	16.33
45	22	"Love's Illusions"	Allan Arkush	David E. Kelley	May 17, 1999	2M22	16.09
46	23	"I Know Him by Heart"	Jonathan Pontell	David E. Kelley	May 24, 1999	2M23	14.94

=== Season 3 (1999–2000) ===
No. overall	No. in season	Title	Directed by	Written by	Original release date	Prod. code	Viewers (millions)
47	1	"Car Wash"	Billy Dickson	David E. Kelley	October 25, 1999	3M01	16.02
48	2	"Buried Pleasures"	Mel Damski	David E. Kelley	November 1, 1999	3M02	16.86
49	3	"Seeing Green"	Peter MacNicol	David E. Kelley	November 8, 1999	3M03	13.65
50	4	"Heat Wave"	Alex Graves	David E. Kelley	November 15, 1999	3M04	14.98
51	5	"Troubled Water"	Joanna Kerns	David E. Kelley	November 22, 1999	3M05	14.52
52	6	"Changes"	Arlene Sanford	David E. Kelley	November 29, 1999	3M06	14.65
53	7	"Saving Santa"	Rachel Talalay	David E. Kelley	December 13, 1999	3M07	14.40
54	8	"Blue Christmas"	Jonathan Pontell	David E. Kelley	December 20, 1999	3M08	12.86
55	9	"Out in the Cold"	Dennie Gordon	Story by : David E. Kelley & Josh Caplan; Teleplay by : David E. Kelley	January 10, 2000	3M09	15.70
56	10	"Just Friends"	Michael Schultz	David E. Kelley	January 17, 2000	3M10	14.41
57	11	"Over the Rainbow"	Alan Myerson	David E. Kelley	February 7, 2000	3M11	14.70
58	12	"In Search of Pygmies"	Arvin Brown	Story by : David E. Kelley & Josh Caplan; Teleplay by : David E. Kelley	February 14, 2000	3M12	13.98
59	13	"Pursuit of Loneliness"	Jonathan Pontell	David E. Kelley	February 21, 2000	3M13	15.11
60	14	"The Oddball Parade"	Bryan Gordon	David E. Kelley	February 28, 2000	3M14	15.23
61	15	"Prime Suspect"	Rachel Talalay	David E. Kelley	March 20, 2000	3M15	14.41
62	16	"Boy Next Door"	Jack Bender	David E. Kelley	March 27, 2000	3M16	14.55
63	17	"I Will Survive"	Barnet Kellman	David E. Kelley	April 17, 2000	3M17	13.05
64	18	"Turning Thirty"	Jeannot Szwarc	David E. Kelley & Jill Goldsmith	May 1, 2000	3M18	12.11
65	19	"Do You Wanna Dance?"	Michael Lange	David E. Kelley	May 8, 2000	3M19	10.75
66	20	"Hope and Glory"	Mel Damski	David E. Kelley	May 15, 2000	3M20	11.50
67	21	"Ally McBeal: The Musical, Almost"	Bill D'Elia	David E. Kelley	May 22, 2000	3M21	11.17

=== Season 4 (2000–01) ===
No. overall	No. in season	Title	Directed by	Written by	Original release date	Prod. code	Viewers (millions)
68	1	"Sex, Lies and Second Thoughts"	Bill D'Elia	David E. Kelley	October 23, 2000	4M01	13.23
69	2	"Girls' Night Out"	Jeannot Szwarc	David E. Kelley	October 30, 2000	4M02	13.38
70	3	"Two's a Crowd"	Rachel Talalay	David E. Kelley	November 6, 2000	4M03	12.62
71	4	"Without a Net"	Mel Damski	David E. Kelley	November 13, 2000	4M04	12.86
72	5	"The Last Virgin"	Bill D'Elia	David E. Kelley	November 20, 2000	4M05	12.34
73	6	"'Tis the Season"	Arlene Sanford	David E. Kelley	November 27, 2000	4M06	14.03
74	7	"Love on Holiday"	Bethany Rooney	Story by : David E. Kelley & Alicia Martin & Barb Mackintosh; Teleplay by : David E. Kelley	December 4, 2000	4M07	13.03
75	8	"The Man with the Bag"	Billy Dickson	David E. Kelley	December 11, 2000	4M08	14.09
76	9	"Reason to Believe"	Ron Lagomarsino	David E. Kelley	January 8, 2001	4M09	12.56
77	10	"The Ex-Files"	Jack Bender	David E. Kelley	January 15, 2001	4M10	13.55
78	11	"Mr. Bo"	Michael Schultz	David E. Kelley	January 22, 2001	4M11	13.77
79	12	"Hats Off to Larry"	Jeannot Szwarc	Story by : David E. Kelley & Melissa Rosenberg & Barb Mackintosh; Teleplay by : David E. Kelley	February 5, 2001	4M12	13.75
80	13	"Reach Out and Touch"	Kenny Ortega	David E. Kelley	February 12, 2001	4M13	12.32
81	14	"Boys Town"	David Grossman	David E. Kelley	February 19, 2001	4M14	13.19
82	15	"Falling Up"	Oz Scott	David E. Kelley	February 26, 2001	4M15	13.85
83	16	"The Getaway"	Bill D'Elia	David E. Kelley	March 19, 2001	4M16	12.48
84	17	"The Pursuit of Unhappiness"	Kenny Ortega	Story by : David E. Kelley & Kerry Lenhart & John J. Sakmar; Teleplay by : David E. Kelley	March 26, 2001	4M17	12.39
85	18	"The Obstacle Course"	Joanna Kerns	David E. Kelley & Kayla Alpert	April 16, 2001	4M18	11.96
86	19	"In Search of Barry White"	Adam Arkin	David E. Kelley	April 23, 2001	4M19	11.76
87	20	"Cloudy Skies, Chance of Parade"	Billy Dickson	David E. Kelley	April 30, 2001	4M20	12.63
88	21	"Queen Bee"	Bethany Rooney	David E. Kelley	May 7, 2001	4M21	11.82
89	22	"Home Again"	Michael Schultz	David E. Kelley	May 14, 2001	4M22	12.65
90	23	"The Wedding"	Bill D'Elia	David E. Kelley	May 21, 2001	4M23	11.02

=== Season 5 (2001–02) ===
No. overall	No. in season	Title	Directed by	Written by	Original release date	Prod. code	Viewers (millions)
91	1	"Friends and Lovers"	Bill D'Elia	David E. Kelley	October 29, 2001	5M01	10.95
92	2	"Judge Ling"	Oz Scott	David E. Kelley	November 5, 2001	5M02	10.20
93	3	"Neutral Corners"	Arvin Brown	David E. Kelley	November 12, 2001	5M03	10.40
94	4	"Fear of Flirting"	Greg Germann	David E. Kelley & Constance M. Burge & Roberto Benabib	November 19, 2001	5M04	9.84
95	5	"I Want Love"	Michael Schultz	David E. Kelley	November 26, 2001	5M05	10.88
96	6	"Lost and Found"	Mel Damski	Story by : David E. Kelley & Peter Blake; Teleplay by : David E. Kelley	December 3, 2001	5M06	9.40
97	7	"Nine One One"	Billy Dickson	David E. Kelley	December 10, 2001	5M07	9.27
98	8	"Playing with Matches"	David Semel	Story by : David E. Kelley & Constance M. Burge & Roberto Benabib; Teleplay by : David E. Kelley	January 7, 2002	5M08	9.99
99	9	"Blowin' in the Wind"	Rachel Talalay	Constance M. Burge & Roberto Benabib & Cindy Lichtman	January 14, 2002	5M09	10.32
100	10	"One Hundred Tears"	Bill D'Elia	David E. Kelley	January 21, 2002	5M10	10.79
101	11	"A Kick in the Head"	David Grossman & Jeannot Szwarc	David E. Kelley	February 4, 2002	5M11	11.82
102	12	"The New Day"	Bethany Rooney	David E. Kelley	February 11, 2002	5M12	8.08
103	13	"Woman"	Jeannot Szwarc	David E. Kelley	February 18, 2002	5M13	8.77
104	14	"Homecoming"	Billy Dickson	Story by : David E. Kelley & Constance M. Burge & Roberto Benabib; Teleplay by : David E. Kelley	February 25, 2002	5M14	10.48
105	15	"Heart and Soul"	Steve Gomer	David E. Kelley	March 4, 2002	5M15	9.10
106	16	"Love Is All Around"	Arlene Sanford	Story by : David E. Kelley & Constance M. Burge & Roberto Benabib & Cindy Lichtman; Teleplay by : David E. Kelley	April 15, 2002	5M16	8.12
107	17	"Love Is All Around"	Arlene Sanford	Story by : David E. Kelley & Constance M. Burge & Roberto Benabib & Cindy Lichtman; Teleplay by : David E. Kelley	April 15, 2002	5M17	8.12
108	18	"Tom Dooley"	Sarah Pia Anderson	David E. Kelley	April 22, 2002	5M18	8.14
109	19	"Another One Bites the Dust"	Kenny Ortega	Story by : David E. Kelley & Constance M. Burge & Roberto Benabib; Teleplay by : David E. Kelley	April 29, 2002	5M19	7.71
110	20	"What I'll Never Do for Love Again" "Reality Bites"	Billy Dickson	David E. Kelley	May 6, 2002	5M20	8.78
111	21	"All of Me"	Bethany Rooney	David E. Kelley & Peter MacNicol	May 13, 2002	5M21	8.00
112	22	"Bygones"	Bill D'Elia	David E. Kelley	May 20, 2002	5M22	11.51

== See also ==
- List of The Practice episodes - includes the 1998 crossover episode "Axe Murderer"
