= Neo Ned =

2005 film by Van Fischer

- Original DVD Artwork
- Directed by: Van Fischer
- Written by: Tim Boughn
- Produced by: David E. Allen; Mark Borman; Valerie McCaffrey
- Starring: Jeremy Renner; Gabrielle Union; Sally Kirkland; Eddie Kaye Thomas; Ethan Suplee; Michael Cavanaugh; Michael Shamus Wiles; Richard Riehle; Giuseppe Andrews; Joanne Baron; Robert Peters; Steve Railsback; Cary Elwes
- Cinematography: Chris Manley
- Edited by: Bipasha Shom
- Music by: Manish Raval; Tom Wolfe
- Production companies: David E. Allen; Blue Raven Films; Mark Borman
- Distributed by: Kismet Entainment Group; CodeBlack Entertainment; Vivendi Entertainment
- Release date: April 22, 2005
- Running time: 97 minutes
- Country: United States
- Language: English

Neo Ned is a 2005 American film starring Jeremy Renner, Gabrielle Union, Sally Kirkland, Cary Elwes, Eddie Kaye Thomas, and Ethan Suplee. It was written by Tim Boughn and directed by Van Fischer.

== Synopsis ==
Plot

Edward “Ned” Nelson (Jeremy Renner) is a troubled young man who has spent much of his life struggling with abandonment, instability, and a desire to belong. As a child, Ned idolized his father, Lou Nelson, a career criminal whose repeated imprisonment left him largely absent from his son’s upbringing. After experiencing an unstable childhood that included time in foster care, Ned becomes involved with the Aryan Brotherhood and adopts the appearance and ideology of a neo-Nazi skinhead. Following his involvement in a racially motivated killing, Ned is placed in a psychiatric institution.

At the institution, Ned frequently causes disturbances through violent outbursts, confrontations with staff, and deliberately provocative behavior. His conduct attracts the attention of Dr. Magnuson (Cary Elwes) and the hospital’s orderlies. Ned’s routine changes with the arrival of Rachael (Gabrielle Union), a young African-American woman who displays similarly disruptive behavior and claims to be the reincarnation of Adolf Hitler. Intrigued by the apparent contradiction between Rachael’s racial identity and her supposed identification with Hitler, Ned attempts to befriend her.

Despite Ned’s racist language and erratic behavior, the two gradually develop a friendship. Rachael recognizes that much of Ned’s aggressive persona conceals emotional insecurity, while Ned becomes increasingly attracted to her. Their interactions reveal that neither fully conforms to the identity they initially present. Ned’s identification with white supremacism is connected to his desire for acceptance, while Rachael’s claims about Hitler are eventually revealed to have been fabricated to secure admission to the psychiatric institution.

Following repeated behavioral problems, Ned is discharged from the hospital. Wanting to remain close to Rachael, he returns during a group outing to a zoo and persuades her to leave with him. The pair drive away in a stolen car and begin a romantic relationship. During their travels, they take shelter at an abandoned gas station during a rainstorm, where their relationship becomes intimate.

Ned subsequently introduces Rachael to his mother, Shelly Nelson (Sally Kirkland), who lives in a trailer park. Shelly has repeatedly appeared on sensationalist television talk shows to discuss her troubled family, including her imprisoned husband and her son’s extremist associations. Although initially surprised by Ned’s relationship with a Black woman, she welcomes Rachael and soon recognizes the couple’s potential as another subject for television appearances.

As Ned and Rachael attempt to establish a life together, their respective histories become clearer. Ned discusses his childhood, his father’s imprisonment, and his experiences in foster care. Rachael reveals that she was sexually abused as a child by a photographer and that she has a young daughter who is being cared for by her grandmother. Her experiences have left her with unresolved emotional trauma, which contributed to her decision to seek psychiatric treatment.

Rachael encourages Ned to abandon his previous lifestyle and become more responsible. He obtains employment as a cook, but struggles to maintain a stable routine. After encountering former acquaintances at work, Ned abandons his responsibilities to attend a party, where he spends the night with another woman. His infidelity damages his relationship with Rachael, who decides that she must leave him and return to her daughter.

Although Ned asks to accompany her so they can live together as a family, Rachael refuses. He nevertheless insists on driving her home. Unknown to Rachael, Ned has located the photographer responsible for abusing her during childhood. Determined to confront the man, Ned stops at his residence and enters to confront him. Rachael initially remains in the car but eventually follows Ned inside.

During the confrontation, Rachael faces the man who abused her. When he refuses to accept responsibility for his actions, the encounter escalates. Armed with a gun, Rachael shoots him. Recognizing the consequences she could face, Ned takes the weapon and fires additional shots into the man, intending to assume responsibility for the killing. He tells Rachael to leave and return to her daughter before the police arrive.

Ned is subsequently imprisoned for the killing. In prison, he is reunited with his father, fulfilling his childhood desire to be close to him, although under circumstances similar to those that had defined his father’s life.

Meanwhile, Rachael leaves with her daughter, driving away in the stolen car that she and Ned had used during their relationship. The film concludes with the couple separated, as Ned accepts imprisonment and Rachael begins a new chapter of her life with her child.

== Cast ==
- Jeremy Renner as Edward "Ned" Nelson
- Gabrielle Union as Rachael
- Sally Kirkland as Shelly Nelson
- Cary Elwes as Dr. Magnuson
- Eddie Kaye Thomas as Joey
- Ethan Suplee as Orderly Johnny
- Giuseppe Andrews as Josh
- Steve Railsback as Mr. Day
- Richard Riehle as Officer Roy Pendleton
- Michael Shamus Wiles as Lou "Luke" Nelson / Ned's Dad
- Anthony Morgann as Social Worker

== Reception ==
On Rotten Tomatoes it has a score of 67% based on reviews from 6 critics.

Mark Olsen of the Los Angeles Times gave it 3.5 out of 5, and wrote: "It's a little rough around the edges, to be sure, but with such strong lead performances there is something irresistible in the film's audaciously straight-faced portrayal of such an unlikely relationship." Variety reviewer John Anderson also reviewed the film favorably, writing, "Neo Ned may be ludicrous on paper, but it has what fans of independent film are looking for -- atmosphere, humanity and just a dash of fantastic drama." Mark Bell of Film Threat gave the film 4.5 out of 5, writing, "Never boring, never pretentious, never preachy, Neo Ned could find its place alongside some of the great independent romance films of all time, if enough people are able to catch a glimpse of it."

The film's treatment of its subject matter and tone was criticized, with Jasmyne Keimig writing that "The disgust over Neo Ned is rightfully deserved. The movie carelessly throws around the n-word and other acts of violence for humor" and L.A. Weekly writer Matthew Duersten stating, "The problem lies in the film's inability to decide whether such loaded images are funny in a Farrelly Brothers/Dave Chapelle [sic] kind of way or if they mean something deeper."

Gabrielle Union expressed dissatisfaction with her performance.

== Awards ==
The film has won ten film festival awards, out of ten total nominations.

=== 2005 ===
Slamdance Film Festival

- Best Narrative Feature

=== 2006 ===
Ashland Independent Film Festival

- Best Feature Film

Newport Beach Film Festival

- Outstanding Achievement in Directing, Van Fischer

Palm Beach International Film Festival

- Best Actor, Jeremy Renner
- Best Actress, Gabrielle Union
- Best Director, Van Fischer
- Best Feature

San Diego Film Festival

- Best Screenplay - Tim Boughn
- Audience Award - Best Narrative Feature

Sarasota Film Festival

- Best Narrative Feature

== Film release ==
After three years of festival screenings (from 2005's Tribeca Film Festival premiere to 2008's Suppository Films Reelblack Festival), the film premiered on Starz on August 19, 2008. It was picked up for distribution by CodeBlack Entertainment, which released the film on DVD on December 2, 2008.
