= Jeremy Renner =

American actor (born 1971)

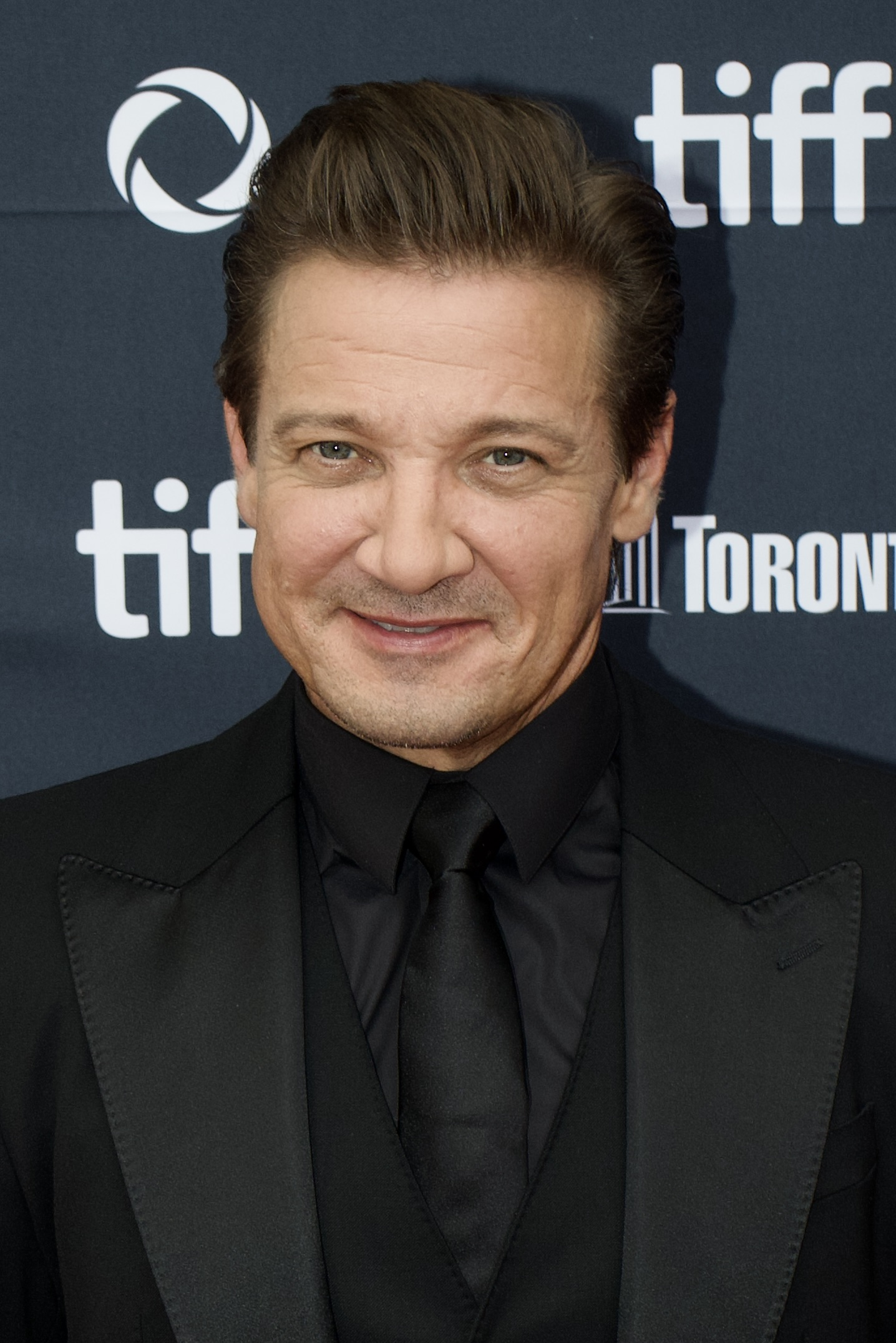
- Renner in 2025
- Born: Jeremy Lee Renner; January 7, 1971 (age 55); Modesto, California, U.S.
- Education: Modesto Junior College
- Occupations: Actor; author; singer; producer
- Years active: 1995–present
- Spouse: Sonni Pacheco (m. 2014; div. 2015)
- Children: 1
- Awards: Full list

Jeremy Lee Renner (born January 7, 1971) is an American actor, author, singer, and producer. He began his career by appearing in independent films such as Dahmer (2002) and Neo Ned (2005), then supporting roles in bigger films, such as S.W.A.T. (2003) and 28 Weeks Later (2007). Renner gained Academy Award nominations for Best Actor for his performance as an Iraq War soldier in The Hurt Locker (2009) and for Best Supporting Actor for playing a hot-headed robber in The Town (2010).

Renner has played Clint Barton / Hawkeye in the Marvel Cinematic Universe, including the film The Avengers (2012) and the Disney+ miniseries Hawkeye (2021). He has also appeared in the Mission: Impossible (2011–2015) and Bourne (2012) action film series and the drama films American Hustle (2013) and Arrival (2016). Since 2021, he has starred in the Paramount+ crime thriller series Mayor of Kingstown.

In 2023, Renner survived a near-fatal snowplow accident, undergoing a widely publicized recovery before returning to film in Wake Up Dead Man (2025), the third film in the Knives Out mystery film series.

== Early life and education ==
Jeremy Lee Renner was born on January 7, 1971 in Modesto, California. His mother, Valerie Cearley (née Tague), and father, Lee Renner, managed McHenry Bowl, a Modesto bowling alley, in the 1980s. His parents married as teenagers and divorced when he was ten. He is the oldest of seven siblings, the youngest of whom was born in 2011. He is of Irish and German descent.

Renner graduated from Fred C. Beyer High School in Modesto in 1989. He attended Modesto Junior College, where he studied computer science and criminology, before he took a drama class as an elective and decided to pursue acting.

== Career ==
=== 1995–2001: Early work ===
Renner made his film debut as an underachieving student in the 1995 comedy National Lampoon's Senior Trip. Although the film was critically panned, he went on to guest star on two television shows, Deadly Games and Strange Luck, and had a minor role in the television film A Friend's Betrayal as the friend of Paul Hewitt (Brian Austin Green). Over the next few years, Renner had guest roles in Zoe, Duncan, Jack and Jane (1999), The Net (1999), The Time of Your Life (1999), and Angel (2000). In 2001, Renner had a small role in an episode of CSI: Crime Scene Investigation. Renner worked as a makeup artist during this period to help make ends meet.

=== 2002–2008: Early success ===
In 2002, Renner starred in Dahmer as the eponymous serial killer Jeffrey Dahmer. He found the non-fiction role a challenge to cope with after he had finished shooting the film, knowing that Dahmer had murdered seventeen victims. His performance was well received, and he gained a nomination for the Independent Spirit Award for Best Lead Male. He also appeared in Pink's 2003 music video for her song "Trouble" as a Bad Boy Sheriff. Renner went on to appear in S.W.A.T. as the former police partner of Colin Farrell's character in 2003 and The Heart Is Deceitful Above All Things in 2004.

In 2005, Renner starred with Julia Stiles and Forest Whitaker in A Little Trip to Heaven, with roles in North Country and 12 and Holding. He next starred as a neo-Nazi skinhead who is admitted into a psychiatric hospital in Neo Ned with Gabrielle Union. The film won awards at multiple film festivals, including the Palm Beach International Film Festival Award for Best Actor. Renner also had a small (though uncredited) role in the skateboard film Lords of Dogtown as the manager of Emile Hirsch's character. In 2006, he starred with Ginnifer Goodwin in Love Comes to the Executioner.

In 2007, Renner had supporting roles in the critically acclaimed The Assassination of Jesse James by the Coward Robert Ford as Wood Hite, the cousin of outlaw Jesse James (portrayed by Brad Pitt), and as Sergeant Doyle in 28 Weeks Later. He starred with Minnie Driver in Take and guest-starred as a patient (a reckless rock musician) in an episode of House. Renner had a role in the pilot of The Oaks, but the series was not picked up.

=== 2009–2013: Critical and commercial breakout ===
After starring in the comedy-drama Ingenious and the short-lived television series The Unusuals, Renner portrayed U.S. Army bomb disposal expert Sergeant First Class William James in the 2009 Iraq War thriller The Hurt Locker, directed by Kathryn Bigelow. The role earned him several Best Actor awards and his first Academy Award nomination for Best Actor as well a Screen Actors Guild Award nomination.

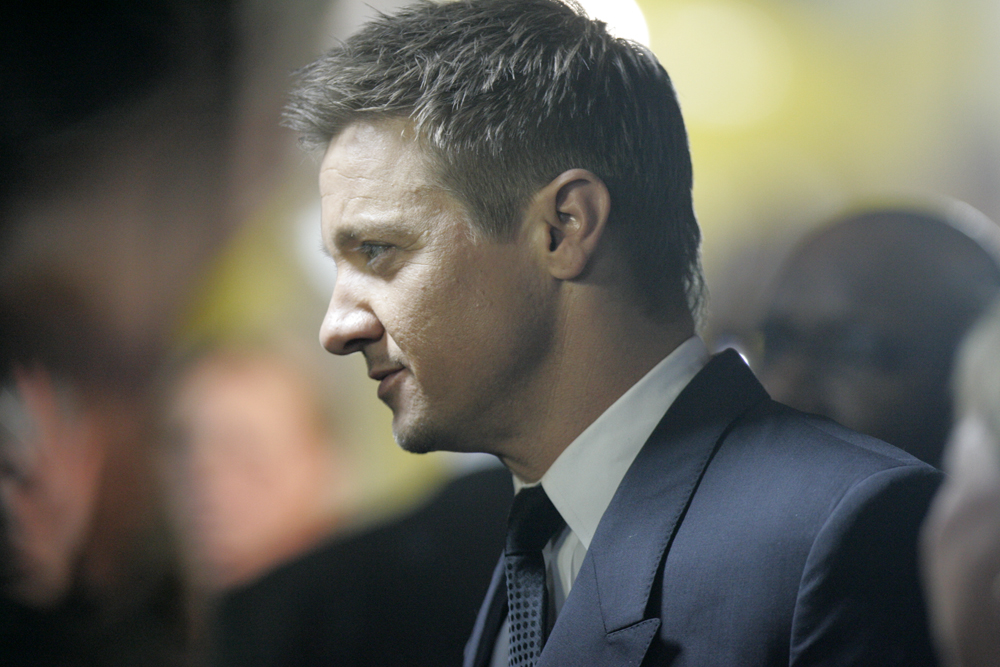
Renner at The Bourne Legacy premiere in Sydney, Australia

In 2010, Renner's performance in Ben Affleck's The Town, alongside Jon Hamm and Blake Lively, received extremely positive reviews and earned him his second Academy Award nomination, for Best Supporting Actor. He also gained his first Golden Globe nomination in the same category and his second Screen Actors Guild nomination. The Hollywood Reporter named Renner as one of the young male actors who are "pushing – or being pushed" into taking over Hollywood as the new "A-List".

In 2011, Renner starred as William Brandt in the fourth Mission: Impossible film, Ghost Protocol, and made his screen introduction as Hawkeye in an uncredited cameo appearance in Marvel Studios' Thor, teasing his starring role in The Avengers, released in May 2012. The same year, he also starred in the fourth film in the Bourne franchise, The Bourne Legacy, written and directed by Tony Gilroy. Renner played a new lead character, Aaron Cross, in place of Jason Bourne, played by Matt Damon in the first three films. Renner has expressed interest in doing a Bourne film with Damon in the future, stating that "[it] would be kick-ass. I love Matt".

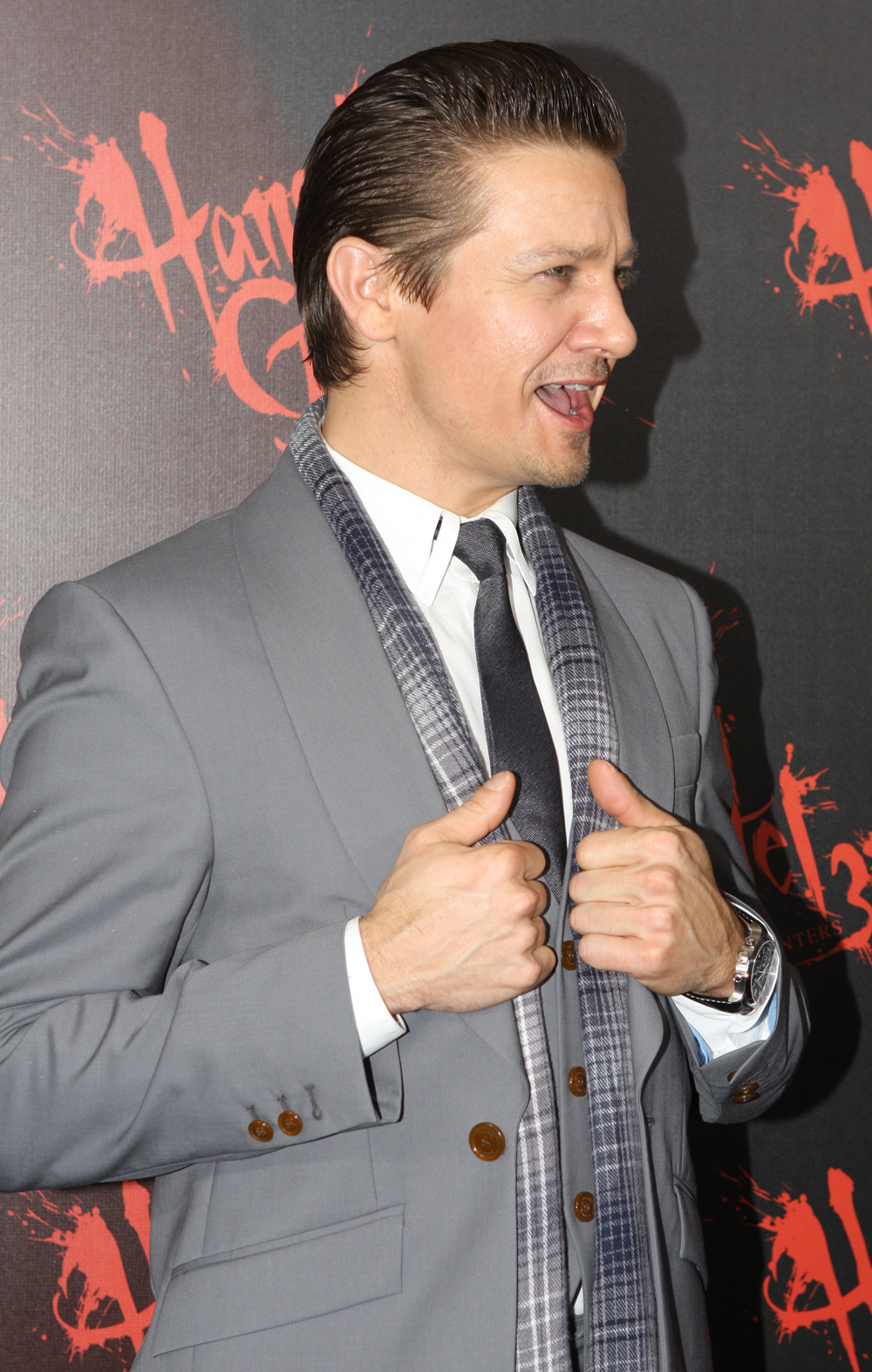
Renner at the Hansel and Gretel: Witch Hunters premiere in 2013

Renner starred in Hansel & Gretel: Witch Hunters in a titular role alongside Gemma Arterton. Filmed in 2011 and released in January 2013, the 3-D fantasy action film was set 15 years after Hansel and Gretel killed the witch who kidnapped them. Renner was also featured in the ensemble cast of David O. Russell's American Hustle (2013), based on the controversial FBI ABSCAM operation of the late 1970s and early 1980s. The film, with Christian Bale, Bradley Cooper, Amy Adams and Jennifer Lawrence in principal roles, received much critical acclaim, including a Screen Actors Guild Award for the cast and a nomination for the Academy Award for Best Picture.

=== 2014–2020: Mainstream success ===
In October 2014, Renner starred as journalist Gary Webb in the Focus Features film Kill the Messenger, based on Webb's book Dark Alliance. Renner also co-produced the film. In December 2014, Crackle aired The Throwaways, a film for which Renner served as executive producer.

In 2015, Renner reprised his role as Hawkeye in Avengers: Age of Ultron, the sequel to The Avengers. He returned to the Mission: Impossible franchise in Mission: Impossible – Rogue Nation, released in July 2015. In 2016, Renner played Hawkeye again in the summer blockbuster film Captain America: Civil War, and starred with Amy Adams in the sci-fi film Arrival. Renner is a producer of the 2016 film The Founder starring Michael Keaton as Ray Kroc. In 2015, his production company The Combine signed a deal with PalmStar Media.

In 2016, Renner was an executive producer on History's historical drama Knightfall. In 2017, while working on the film Tag (2018), Renner fractured his right elbow and his left wrist. He appeared in the film Wind River with his MCU co-star Elizabeth Olsen in 2016.

Renner filmed scenes as Hawkeye for Avengers: Infinity War (2018), but ultimately did not appear in the film, with his scenes instead moved to Avengers: Endgame (2019), where he had a starring role. Because of scheduling conflicts resulting from the filming of Infinity War and Endgame, he was unable to reprise his role as William Brandt in Mission: Impossible – Fallout (2018). In July 2018, Renner was announced to play Twitch Williams in Todd McFarlane's King Spawn.

=== 2021–present: Current projects ===
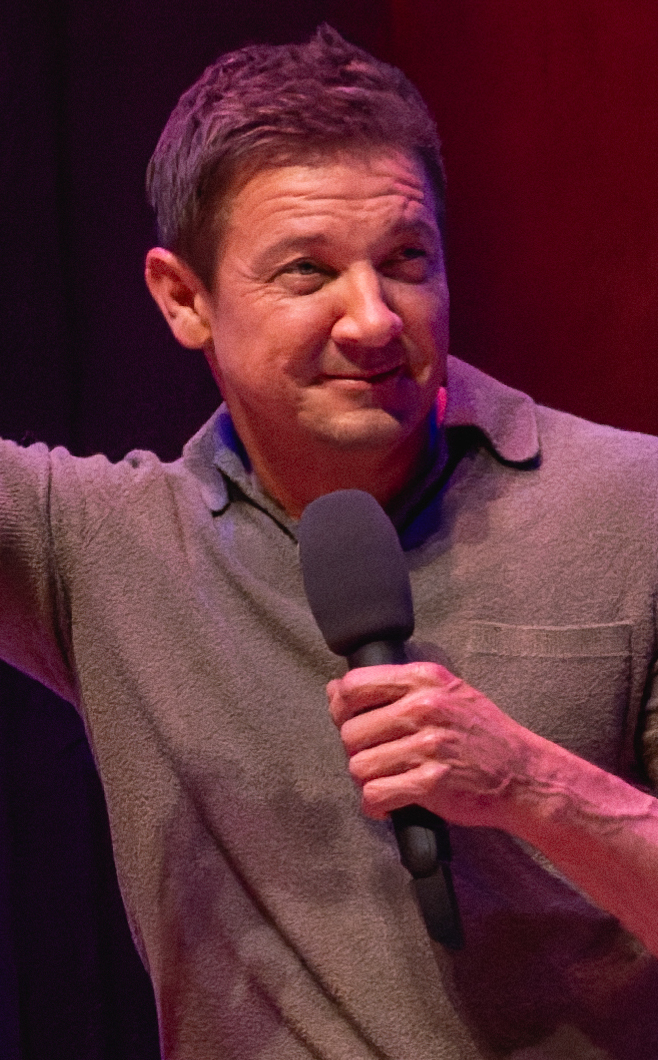
Renner at the Cadogan Hall, Chelsea, London, in June 2025

He reprised his role as Hawkeye in the eponymous 2021 Disney+ series. In the same year, Renner began starring in the Paramount+ series Mayor of Kingstown.

In 2024, Renner appeared in a Super Bowl commercial for the brand Silk, alongside his daughter.

Following his accident and recovery, Renner's first major feature film role was in the 2025 Rian Johnson mystery Wake Up Dead Man. His return to acting was a significant focus of the film's media coverage.

== Other activities ==
=== Music ===
Renner is a singer-songwriter, guitarist, keyboardist, and drummer. Early in his acting career, he performed in the Sons of Ben. He has performed songs on several film soundtracks: "I Drink Alone" for North Country, "American Pie" for Love Comes to the Executioner, and "Good Ole Rebel" for The Assassination of Jesse James by the Coward Robert Ford. He also appeared in music videos for "Trouble" by P!nk and "Scenes on Sunset" by Brother Sal. He was featured on Sam Feldt's 2018 single, "Heaven (Don't Have a Name)". Renner subsequently released his first EP, The Medicine, on March 27, 2020. In 2024, he released the EP Love and Titanium, a musical project directly inspired by his recovery journey.

=== Mobile app ===
Renner released a mobile app called Jeremy Renner (Android) and Jeremy Renner Official (iOS) in March 2017. The app was created by Escapex, a company that specializes in monetized apps for celebrities. Fast Company wrote extensively about Renner's app in April 2019, calling it "a surprising new kind of social media".

The community developed to include memes, selfies, and a "Happy Rennsday" event on Wednesdays. As early as October 2017, there were claims of censorship, bullying, and "contest-rigging". In September 2019, comedian Stefan Heck publicized his discovery of the fact that replies through the app appear as if they were sent by Renner himself in push notifications. After several users abused this feature, Renner asked Escapex to shut down the app.

=== Book ===
Renner wrote a memoir about his life and recovery following the snowplow incident, titled My Next Breath. It was published April 29, 2025, by Flatrock, a subsidiary of MacMillan. The audio format of the book is read by Renner and includes recordings of the event and a special recording. It was also made available on April 29, 2025.

=== RennerVation Foundation ===
Renner founded the charity RennerVation Foundation in 2023 to support foster kids and at-risk youth. The foundation hosts a summer camp at Lake Tahoe.

== Personal life ==
Renner married Canadian model Sonni Pacheco on January 13, 2014. Renner and Pacheco have a daughter. On December 30, 2014, Pacheco filed for divorce from Renner, citing irreconcilable differences. They share custody of their daughter. Pacheco and their daughter made cameo appearances in the film American Hustle.

Since 2014, Renner lives in Washoe County, Nevada, near Nevada State Route 431 and the Mount Rose ski resort. He has a house-renovating business with his best friend and fellow actor, Kristoffer Winters. He studied Arnis and Muay Thai martial arts as preparation for his roles in the Mission: Impossible and Avengers franchises.

Renner is a fan of the San Francisco 49ers. He narrated the NFL Network documentary series The Timeline episode "A Tale of Two Cities", which chronicles the history of the team's rivalry with the Dallas Cowboys, with Renner narrating from the San Francisco perspective and the Dallas perspective narrated by actor Sam Elliott. Renner also narrated the introductory video for the grand opening of Levi's Stadium.

=== 2023 snowplow accident ===
On January 1, 2023, Renner was hospitalized after suffering blunt chest trauma and 38 broken bones. He saved his nephew from being run over by his snowplow, but was hit, by a snowcat weighing 14,330 pounds (7.17 short tons). Renner was flown by helicopter to Renown Regional Medical Center. He underwent surgery and remained in the intensive care unit in critical condition. By January 17, he was released from the hospital and had returned home to continue his recovery.

Approximately three months after the accident, Renner was beginning to be able to walk with a cane. Doctors said that his survival was probably aided by his health and fitness. By June 2024, he had recovered enough to be the subject of a cover story in that summer's issue of Men's Health, which included his first-person recollection of the accident and a detailed description of his injuries. Renner admitted to struggling with the fame from his MCU role as Hawkeye before the accident, but he had since been more amicable in public as fans wished him well and could relate to his recovery struggles.

=== Sexual harassment and abuse allegation ===
In November 2025, filmmaker Yi Zhou alleged that Renner had subjected her to sexual misconduct and abuse. Zhou, a Chinese national, alleged that Renner threatened to "call ICE" on her after she confronted him about alleged misconduct, which involved sending her unsolicited sexual photos of himself earlier that year, and shouting at her while drunk at his home, leading her to fear for her life. Renner denied the allegations, insisting they had shared a "brief consensual encounter". Renner's attorney responded with a cease-and-desist letter to Zhou.

== Filmography ==
=== Film ===
Year	Title	Role	Notes	Ref.
1995	National Lampoon's Senior Trip	Mark "Dags" D'Agastino		
1996	Paper Dragons	Jack		
2001	Fish in a Barrel	Remy		
2002	Monkey Love	Dil		
2002	Dahmer	Jeffrey Dahmer		
2003	S.W.A.T.	Brian Gamble		
2004	The Heart Is Deceitful Above All Things	Emerson		
2005	A Little Trip to Heaven	Fred		
2005	North Country	Bobby Sharp		
2005	12 and Holding	Gus Maitland		
2005	Neo Ned	Ned		
2005	Lords of Dogtown	Jay Adams' Manager	Uncredited	
2006	Love Comes to the Executioner	Chick Prigusivac		
2007	The Assassination of Jesse James by the Coward Robert Ford	Wood Hite		
2007	28 Weeks Later	Sergeant Doyle		
2007	Take	Saul		
2008	The Hurt Locker	Sergeant First Class William James		
2009	Ingenious	Sam	aka Lightbulb	
2010	The Town	James "Jem" Coughlin		
2011	Thor	Clint Barton / Hawkeye	Uncredited cameo	
2011	Mission: Impossible – Ghost Protocol	William Brandt		
2012	The Avengers	Clint Barton / Hawkeye		
2012	The Bourne Legacy	Aaron Cross / Kenneth J. Kitsom		
2013	Hansel & Gretel: Witch Hunters	Hansel		
2013	The Immigrant	Orlando the Magician		
2013	American Hustle	Carmine Polito		
2014	Kill the Messenger	Gary Webb	Also producer	
2015	Avengers: Age of Ultron	Clint Barton / Hawkeye		
2015	Mission: Impossible – Rogue Nation	William Brandt		
2016	Captain America: Civil War	Clint Barton / Hawkeye		
2016	Arrival	Ian Donnelly		
2017	Wind River	Cory Lambert		
2017	The House	Tommy Papouli	Cameo	
2018	Tag	Jerry Pierce		
2019	Arctic Dogs	Swifty	Lead voice role	
2019	Avengers: Endgame	Clint Barton / Hawkeye / Ronin		
2021	Black Widow	Clint Barton / Hawkeye / Ronin	Voice; uncredited cameo	
2021	Back Home Again	Lieutenant Timber	Voice	
2025	Wake Up Dead Man	Dr. Nathaniel "Nat" Sharp		

=== Television ===
Year	Title	Role	Notes	Ref.
1995	Deadly Games	Tod	1 episode	
1996	Strange Luck	Jojo Picard	1 episode	
1996	A Friend's Betrayal	Simon	Television film	
1997	A Nightmare Come True	Steven Zarn	Television film	
1998	To Have & to Hold	Ted Fury	1 episode	
1999	The Net	Ted Nida	1 episode	
1999	Time of Your Life	Taylor	1 episode	
2000	Angel	Penn	1 episode	
2001	CSI: Crime Scene Investigation	Roger Jennings	1 episode	
2003	The It Factor	Himself	Reality television series	
2007	House	Jimmy Quidd	1 episode	
2009	The Unusuals	Detective Jason Walsh	Main role, 10 episodes	
2011	Robot Chicken	Sergeant First Class William James (voice)	1 episode	
2012	Saturday Night Live	Himself (host)	Episode: "Jeremy Renner/Maroon 5"	
2014	The World Wars	Narrator (voice)	Miniseries, 3 episodes	
2014	Louie	Jeff Davis	1 episode	
2016	The Grand Tour	Himself	1 episode, cameo	
2021–2023	What If...?	Clint Barton / Hawkeye	Voice; 4 episodes	
2021–present	Mayor of Kingstown	Mike McLusky	Main role, 40 episodes; also executive producer	
2021	Hawkeye	Clint Barton / Hawkeye / Ronin	Lead role; miniseries, 6 episodes	
2022	Marvel Studios: Assembled	Himself	Episode: "The Making of Hawkeye "	
2023	Rennervations	Himself	Miniseries, 4 episodes; also executive producer	
2025	It's Florida, Man	Speedy	Episode: "Speedy"	

=== Theatre ===
Year	Title	Role	Venue	Ref.
2017	Our Town	George Gibbs	Fox Theatre	

=== Commercials ===
Year	Title	Role	Notes	Ref.
2024	"Feel Planty Good"	Himself	Silk Super Bowl 2024 commercial	

== Discography ==
=== Extended plays ===
List of extended plays, with release date, label, and format(s) shown
Title	EP details
The Medicine	Released: March 27, 2020; Label: Record Street Music Inc.; Formats: Digital download, streaming; All tracks are written by Jeremy Renner, unless otherwise noted.: No. / Title / Length; 1. / "The Medicine" / 3:31; 2. / "Never Sorry" / 3:30; 3. / "Every Woman" / 4:16; 4. / "Best Part of Me" / 3:40; 5. / "Ghosts and Roses" / 4:24; 6. / "December Days" / 4:30; 7. / "Main Attraction" / 3:49; Total length: / / 27:17
Live for Now	Released: September 25, 2020; Label: Record Street Music Inc.; Formats: Digital download, streaming; All tracks are written by Renner, unless otherwise noted.: No. / Title / Length; 1. / "Live for Now" / 3:33; 2. / "Love Is a War" / 3:56; 3. / "She's a Fire" (with Eric Zayne) / 3:21; 4. / "Just My Type" / 3:06; 5. / "Sippy Cup" / 3:34; 6. / "The One" / 3:33; 7. / "Stereo Love" / 2:57; Total length: / / 24:04
Love and Titanium	Released: January 19, 2024; Label: Record Street Music Inc.; Formats: Digital download, streaming; All tracks are written by Renner, unless otherwise noted.: No. / Title / Length; 1. / "Lucky Man" / 2:56; 2. / "The River" / 3:50; 3. / "Wait" / 3:02; 4. / "Love and Titanium" / 3:03; 5. / "Garden of Stone" / 4:12; 6. / "Lonesome Town" / 4:59; 7. / "Survive" / 3:09; Total length: / / 25:14

=== Singles ===
List of singles, with year released and album details shown
Title	Year	Album
"Mmm Mmm Mmm Mmm" (Crash Test Dummies cover)	2018	Non-album singles
"Heaven (Don't Have a Name)" (with Sam Feldt)	2018	Non-album singles
"House of the Rising Sun" (cover version)	2019	Non-album singles
"Heaven Don't Have a Name" (solo version)	2019	Non-album singles
"Sign"	2019	Arctic Dogs: Original Motion Picture Soundtrack
"Nomad"	2019	Arctic Dogs: Original Motion Picture Soundtrack
"Main Attraction"	2019	The Medicine
"Believer"	2019	Arctic Dogs: Original Motion Picture Soundtrack
"Rebel on the Road (from "Rennervations")	2023	Non-album single
"Wait"	2024	Love and Titanium

=== Guest appearances ===
List of guest appearances, with year released and album details shown
Title	Year	Album
"Have You Seen the Light"	2019	Arctic Dogs: Original Motion Picture Soundtrack
"Dinner for One"	2019	Arctic Dogs: Original Motion Picture Soundtrack
