= Take (film) =

- Film poster
- Directed by: Charles Oliver
- Written by: Charles Oliver
- Produced by: Chet Thomas
- Starring: Minnie Driver; Jeremy Renner; Bobby Coleman; Adam Rodríguez; David Denman
- Cinematography: Tristan Whitman
- Edited by: Andrew McAllister
- Music by: Roger Neill
- Production companies: Crossing Paths; Telos Films
- Distributed by: Liberation Entertainment
- Release date: April 27, 2007
- Running time: 98 minutes
- Country: United States
- Language: English
- Box office: $6,627

Take is a 2007 American crime thriller directed and written by Charles Oliver and starring Minnie Driver, Jeremy Renner, Bobby Coleman, Adam Rodríguez and David Denman. The film premiered at Tribeca Film Festival on April 27, 2007.

== Premise ==
Ana Nichols attends the execution of a criminal, Saul Gregor, whose actions led to tragedy. Interspersed with the present day scenes, flashbacks tell the stories of Ana and Saul.

== Cast ==
- Minnie Driver as Ana Nichols
- Jeremy Renner as Saul Gregor
- Bobby Coleman as Jesse Nichols
- Adam Rodríguez as Steven
- David Denman as Marty Nichols
- Emily Harrison as Wendy
- Bill McKinney as Benjamin Gregor
- Francesca P. Roberts as The Principal
- Jessica Stier as Mrs. Bachanas
- Rocky Marquette as Mark
- Paul Schackman as Sam
- Louis Mandylor as Terrell

== Reception ==
As of June 2020, the film holds a 43% approval rating on Rotten Tomatoes, a review aggregator, based on 28 reviews with an average rating 5.1 out of 10. The site's consensus reads: "A story of redemption held together with flashbacks, Take has moments of emotional intensity, but is ultimately undone by preachiness." Metacritic rated it 22/100. Ronnie Scheib of Variety wrote, "[T]he fragmented past is far more dramatic and suspenseful than the present-day story of retribution, which creates a sense of imbalance and spiritual anticlimax." Frank Scheck of The Hollywood Reporter called it a "grueling, hard-to-take drama that is well worth the viewer's effort". Roger Ebert of the Chicago Sun-Times rated it 2/4 stars and called it "a monotonous slog through dirgeland". Robert Abele of the Los Angeles Times wrote, "Take is called a thriller in its press notes, but it's really one of those tragedy-under-a-microscope slogs that assumes a surfeit of storytelling angles makes a harrowing incident automatically more interesting." Nathan Lee of The New York Times wrote, "If there is anything the cinema needed less than another angst-ridden, cross-cutting tragedy about crime, fate, memory and redemption, it's the kind shot in an ugly monochromatic palette suggesting a world drained of emotions and filmmakers parched of imagination."
