= Escapex =

Mobile app developer

Escapex, stylized as escapex, was a mobile app developer specializing in white-label fan engagement apps for celebrities. It was founded by Sephi Shapira in 2014 and has raised $18 million in funding. It allows celebrities to reach fans directly, as well as receiving revenue from fans through its freemium model.

== Overview ==
Shapira is Israeli and previously founded Interchan and MassiveImpact. He graduated from Ben-Gurion University of the Negev.

The company has raised $18 million in funding. Its 2018 revenue was $5.5 million. In 2016, the company had 57 employees split between Tel Aviv and New York City.

The company's General Manager is Joe Cuello, formerly an executive at MTV, then Chief Creative Officer at TuneCore. Their director of social engagement is Rafe Lopresti-Oakes.

A press release from the company described the service as having a "proprietary loyalty program" which allows "monetization of social engagement through e-commerce and in-app advertising". App launches typically offered a contest for one fan to meet the celebrity. The app also allows Escapex to collect and monetize user profiles for advertising.

The New York Times described the concept of Escapex, musing, "If people love you, why not make money from them?".

== Notable apps ==
The company has created over 350 applications, including:

- Enrique Iglesias, June 2016 or earlier
- Akon, June 2016 or earlier
- Ricky Martin, June 2016 or earlier
- Rohan Marley and the Bob Marley estate, February 2017
- Marc Anthony, March 2017
- Prince Royce, March 2017
- Jeremy Renner, March 2017, making over $35,000 per month in April 2019
- Galen Gering, June 2017
- Yandel, June 2017
- Greg Vaughan, June 2017
- Jason Thompson, June 2017
- Niecy Nash, September 2017
- Tyler Posey, September 2017
- Osric Chau, January 2018
- Chris D'Elia
- Alessandra Ambrosio, making over $35,000 per month in April 2019
- Abigail Ratchford, making over $35,000 per month in April 2019
- Amber Rose, making over $35,000 per month in April 2019
- Dita Von Teese
- Tommy Chong

=== Bollywood stars ===
Escapex has a large roster of Bollywood celebrities, including:

- Sunny Leone, December 2016
- Remo D'Souza, January 2017
- Amy Jackson, March 2017
- Kajal Aggarwal, March 2017
- Nargis Fakhri, April 2017
- Disha Patani
- Sonam Kapoor
- Salman Khan

== Jeremy Renner app ==
Renner released a mobile app called "Jeremy Renner" (Android) and "Jeremy Renner Official" (iOS) in March 2017.

FastCompany wrote extensively about Renner's app in April 2019, calling it "a surprising new kind of social media". The Ringer's Kate Knibbs, explaining how self-referential the app is, summarized it stating "Jeremy Renner's Jeremy Renner app is the Jeremy Renner of apps."

The community developed to include memes, selfies, and a "Happy Rennsday" event on Wednesdays. As early as October 2017 there were claims of censorship, bullying, and "contest-rigging". In September 2019, comedian Stefan Heck wrote about discovering that any replies through the app would appear as if they were sent by Renner himself in push notifications. Heck wrote about notifications making it appear Renner was a big enthusiast of "porno"; other users made it appear Renner was a big fan of Casey Anthony. Renner had to ask Escapex to shut down the app the following day, stating "The app has jumped the shark. Literally."

In September 2020, comedian/writer Caroline Goldfarb and actress Sarah Ramos launched The Renner Files podcast, a six-part series investigating the Jeremy Renner app.
