= Bill Hicks discography =

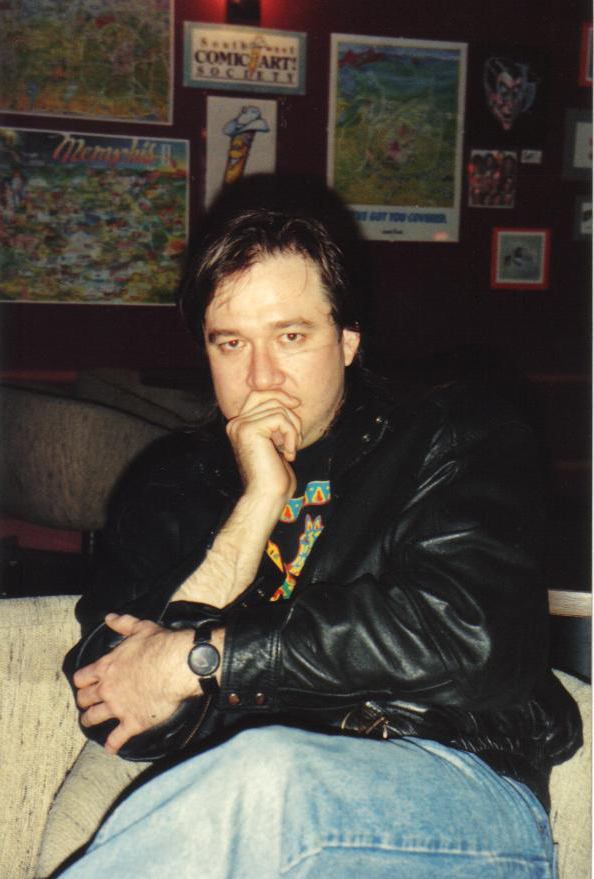
Hicks at the Laff Stop in 1991

The discography of stand-up comedian Bill Hicks.

== Official albums ==
- Dangerous (1990) Recorded 1990, Caroline's, New York City, New York
- Relentless (1992) Recorded December 14–17, 1991 (Different night than film recording of same name)
- Arizona Bay (1997) Recorded November 22, 1992 – June, 1993 Laff Stop, Austin, TX
- Rant in E-Minor (1997) Recorded November 1992 – December 1993
- Philosophy: The Best of Bill Hicks (2001) Compilation
- Love, Laughter and Truth (2002) Recorded 1990–93
- Flying Saucer Tour Vol. 1 (2002) Recorded June 20, 1991, Pittsburgh, Pennsylvania
- Shock and Awe (2003) Abridged. Recorded November 11, 1992, Oxford Playhouse, Oxford, England
- Salvation (2005) Unabridged. Recorded November 11, 1992, Oxford Playhouse, Oxford, England
- The Essential Collection (2010)
- 12/16/61 (2011) Digital EP. Five tracks from when he was 21.
- Arizona Bay Extended (2015)
- Flying Saucer Tour Vol. 2 (2015. San Ramon, California 1992. Included in The Complete Collection)
- Early Bill Hicks (2015. Amarillo '85. Included in The Complete Collection)
- Queen’s Theatre Early Show (2015. UK tour, 1991. Included in The Complete Collection)
- Queen’s Theatre Late Show (2015. UK tour, 1991. Included in The Complete Collection)
- Rant in E-Minor: Variations (2016)
- Revelations Live In London (2017) Record Store Day 2017 Release. Recorded 29 November 1992, Dominion Theatre, London
- Flying Saucer Tour Vol. 3 (2018) Recorded June 20, 1993, West Palm Beach, FL, USA.
- Revelations: Variations (2019) Record Store Day 2019 Release. Extended length recording from the same performance as Revelations Live In London 2017 release.

== Video releases ==
- Sane Man (VHS: 1989; DVD: 2005; (DVD includes a remastered and completely uncut version)
- One Night Stand (VHS: 1991; DVD: 2002;)
- Ninja Bachelor Party (VHS: 1991; DVD: 2010, in The Essential Collection)
- Relentless (VHS: 1992; DVD:2006)
- Revelations (VHS: 1993;)
- American: The Bill Hicks Story (DVD: 2010)

== Video releases in Complete Collection ==
- Live at Comix Annex Houston ’81
- Live at Comix Annex Houston ’84
- Live in Indianapolis ’85
- Live at Comix Annex Houston ’86 show 1
- Live at Comix Annex Houston ’86 show 2
- The Early Years TV Interview
- The Outlaw Comics
- The Outlaw Comics Interview
- Sane Man
- Live at Funny Firm Chicago ’89 (previously unreleased)
- Live at Loonees Colorado Springs ’90 (previously unreleased)
- Live at Igby’s Los Angeles ’90 (previously unreleased)
- Live at Igby’s Los Angeles ’93 (previously unreleased official, also known as Bill's Last Performance)
- Relentless
- Reflections (30-minute documentary played before Relentless movie in theatres from April 2015)
- One Night Stand
- Ninja Bachelor Party
- Live at Zanies Nashville ’91 (previously unreleased)
- Live at Punch Line San Francisco ’91 (previously unreleased)
- Totally Bill Hicks (It's Just a Ride and Revelations)
- Live at the Laff Stop Austin, November ’91 (Clips, not a full show)
- Live at the Laff Stop Austin, December ’92 (Clips, not a full show)
- Live at the Laff Stop Austin, June ’93 (Clips, not a full show)
- Live at the Laff Stop Austin, October ’93 (Clips, not a full show)

== Compilations ==
- Totally Bill Hicks (UK only) (VHS: 1998; DVD: 2002) (comprises the documentary It's Just a Ride and a live performance, Revelations)
- Bill Hicks Live: Satirist, Social Critic, Stand Up Comedian (DVD: 2004) (comprises One Night Stand, Relentless, "It's Just a Ride" and Revelations)
- Bill Hicks: The Complete Collection (2015) A 6 DVD and 12 CD anthology. Includes a total of 24 shows on the DVDs including 6 from previously unreleased footage. Also included are 4 previously unreleased CDs and a 48-page photo book.

== Other releases ==
- 1988: Comedy's Dirtiest Dozen (concert film)
- 2003: Outlaw Comic: The Censoring of Bill Hicks
- 2004: Bill Hicks: Slight Return

== Bootlegs ==
This is an incomplete list of bootlegs, which can or may never satisfy any subjective standard for completeness. Revisions and additions are welcome.

=== Audio bootlegs ===
- The Beginning (1973) (Hicks at 12 years old. The other voice is Dwight Slade, his childhood comedic partner)
- Austin, TX, USA (1989) [known as Sane Man]
- Chicago, IL, USA (1989)
- Chicago, IL, USA (1990)
- Chicago, IL, USA (1991)
- The Funny Firm, Chicago, IL, USA (1990)
- Chicago, IL, USA (1989) [known as I'm Sorry Folks, the infamous "Hicks-Loses-It" show]
- Relentless In Montreal (1992)
- Toronto, Canada (Mar. 15, 1992) [known as Dark Poet]
- Egham Hall, Surrey, England (May 16, 1992) [known as New College]
- Queen's Theatre, London, England - Early Show (May 17, 1992)
- Queen's Theatre, London, England - Late Show (May 17, 1992)
- Brighton, England (Nov. 11, 1992)
- The Lost Hour (Oct. 5, 1993)
- Igby's, Los Angeles, CA, USA (Nov. 17, 1993) [known as Filling Up The Hump]

=== Video bootlegs ===
- Bill Hicks - Houston 1981 - At the ANNEX Comedy Club (At 20 years old)
- Bill Hicks - Houston 1984 - At the ANNEX Comedy Club (At 23 years old)
- Bill Hicks - Indianapolis 1985 (At 24 years old)
- Bill Hicks - Houston 1986 - The Early Years (At 25 years old)
- Bill Hicks - Chicago 1989 (the infamous 'Bill loses it' show - later released as I'm Sorry, Folks)
- Bill Hicks - Chicago 1990 - At The Funny Firm
- Bill Hicks - Adult Video Awards 1990
- Bill Hicks - Austin Texas Laff Stop 1993
- Bill Hicks - Los Angeles - Igby's 1993
- Bill Hicks' Last Show - Jan 5th, 1994

=== Audio interviews ===
- Comedy Hour (1988)
- Comedy Hour (1990)
- College Radio (1990)
- Comedy Hour (1992)
- Comedy Hour (1992)
- Comedy Hour (1993)
- The Howard Stern Show (1993)

=== TV interviews ===
- Hicks' last interview, Dave Prewitt interview on CapZeyeZ (Austin Public Access) 1993.

== See also ==
- HBO One Night Stand
