= List of Tool concert tours =

Grammy Award winning American rock band Tool has toured worldwide extensively.

Tool has performed songs by other artists occasionally in their live sets, including "Spasm" and "You Lied" by Peach, "Stranglehold" by Ted Nugent, "Demon Cleaner" by Kyuss, "No Quarter" by Led Zeppelin, and "Commando" by The Ramones.

The song "Ticks & Leeches" is only rarely performed live due to the immense strain on Keenan's voice. However, they have performed it at least a few times during their 2001 (Irvine, California) and 2002 tours including appearances in Sacramento, California, Tacoma, Washington, Fort Lauderdale, Florida, Katowice (Poland), London (England), and Berlin (Germany), with Keenan using heavy vocal effects and distortion. Tool added 'Ticks & Leeches' back to the set list for the 2012 North American Winter Tour.

== Tour history ==
In 1991, Tool played a number of small clubs in the Los Angeles area and were signed to a major label. The two live tracks of the Opiate EP were recorded during a December 31, 1991, performance. Tool embarked on a U.S. club tour in 1992, playing only one Canadian and one Mexican date. The band often played on a small stage, with minimal or no lighting, sometimes to only a handful of people. The set list would change from night to night, but would usually include most (if not all) of Opiate and a handful of then unreleased songs from Undertow. Some were performed with working lyrics such as "Undertow" and "Bottom".

Tool toured extensively in 1993. The band found themselves on many European festivals as well as the U.S. Lollapalooza festival. They were drawing such a crowd playing the second stage at Lollapalooza that they were moved up to the main stage midway through the tour. The band debuted the songs "Intolerance", "Prison Sex" and "Flood" on January 26, 1993. The set list would vary from night to night, depending on the time slot Tool was allotted, but "Sober" and "Prison Sex" were always played.

Tool toured Europe and the U.S. again in 1994. The band debuted their cover of Led Zeppelin's "No Quarter" as well as the songs "Disgustipated", "Pushit" and "Stinkfist". "No Quarter" often transitioned into "Disgustipated", and "Opiate" would be played back-to-back with "Flood", transitioning smoothly between songs and skipping the lengthy intro to "Flood". During this time, Tool's stage show began to grow and better reflect the band. During a show in London at Shepards Bush, the band had a man dressed as Jesus join them on stage. At the same show, future Tool member (then member of opening band Peach) Justin Chancellor joined the band for the song "Sober". Around the same time, tensions began between Keenan and D'Amour. As in previous years, the set list would change from night to night for most of 1994.

Tool only played a small number of shows during 1995, but it was a very important year for the band, debuting the songs "Eulogy", "H" and "Ænema" in early forms with working lyrics. Tensions were very high between Keenan and D'Amour during this time, and April 14, 1995, would be D'Amour's last live show with the band. Justin Chancellor's first shows with the band were in late 1995, with the first being on December 14th, 1995 at the Tejon Theater in Bakersfield, CA.

In 1996, Tool began their extensive touring for Ænima in Pomona, California, where they debuted "Forty-Six & 2", "Hooker with a Penis", "Jimmy" and "Third Eye". "Die Eier von Satan" was played once on December 19, 1996. They also played South Park's 'Spirit of Christmas' animated Christmas card during the show. During this year, Tool started extending "Prison Sex" by adding an extra verse—known by fans as "Prison Sex OTRM" ("on the road mix" or "over the rainbow mix")—and the intro to "Sober", which later appeared on Salival as the track "Merkaba". Tool's stage show grew with the addition of two giant projection screens. Keenan would paint himself blue and white for his performances, and Chancellor would also sometimes be painted with spots. Although the band was changing the set list up quite a bit at the beginning of the tour, they fell into a 'comfortable' set list during November which was played for the rest of the year with one or two wild card songs. A typical 1996 set list would look like this:

- "Third Eye"
- "Stinkfist"
- "Forty-Six & 2"
- "Cold & Ugly"
- "Eulogy"
- "Prison Sex"
- "Pushit"
- "Merkaba"
- "Sober"
- "Opiate"
- "Ænema"

=== As an opening band ===
| Year | Headliner |
|---|---|
| 1991 | Fishbone |
| 1991 | Green Jellÿ |
| 1991 | Rage Against the Machine |
| 1992 | Corrosion of Conformity |
| 1992 | Rollins Band |
| 1992 | White Zombie |
| 1995 | Primus |

=== As the headlining band ===
| Tour | Years | Opening bands |
|---|---|---|
| Opiate | 1992 | Failure, The Flaming Lips, Peach |
| Undertow | 1993 | Failure, The Flaming Lips, Paw, Headswim, Submarine, Peach, Love Jones |
| Ænima | 1996–1999 | The Cows, Failure, The Melvins, Psychotica |
| Lateralus | 2001–2002 | Cortizone, Fantômas, Cosmic Psychos, King Crimson, The Melvins, Meshuggah, Pablo, Tomahawk, Tricky |
| 10,000 Days | 2006–2007 | Isis, Mastodon, Kinski, Melt-Banana, TU, Big Business, Russian Circles, Trans Am |
| 2009 Tour | 2009 | Tweak Bird |
| 2010 Tour | 2010 | Wovenhand, Dälek, Rajas |
| 2011 Tour | 2011 | Jakob |
| 2012 Tour | 2012 | Intronaut, YOB |
| 2013 Tour | 2013 | Jakob |
| 2014 Tour | 2014 | Failure |
| 2016 Tour | 2016 | Primus, 3Teeth, Once and Future Band, The Crystal Method |
| 2017 Tour | 2017 | |
| Tool in Concert | 2019-2022 | Killing Joke, All Souls, Author & Punisher, Blonde Redhead, The Acid Helps |
| Tool in Concert | 2023-2024 | Steel Beans, Emily Wolfe, Elder, Night Verses |

== Festivals ==
| Tour | Role | Years |
|---|---|---|
| Aftershock Festival | Headline | 2016, 2019, 2023, 2026 |
| All Points West | Headline | 2009 |
| Alternative Nation Festival | | 1995 |
| Area4 | Headline | 2007 |
| Arvika Festival | Headline | 1994 |
| Big Day Out | Headline | 2007, 2011 |
| Big Mele | Headline | 1993 |
| Bonnaroo | Headline | 2007, 2022 |
| Boston Calling | Headline | 2017 |
| Coachella | Headline | 1999, 2006 |
| Chicago Open Air | Headline | 2019 |
| Copenhell | Headline | 2019, 2024 |
| Download Festival | Headline | 2006, 2019 |
| Dour Festival | Main stage | 1994 |
| Edgefest | Headline | 2001, 2012 |
| Epicenter | Headline | 2009 |
| Firenze Rocks | Headline | 2019, 2024 |
| Good Things | Headline | 2025 |
| Governors Ball Music Festival | Headline | 2017 |
| Graspop Metal Meeting | Headline | 2024 |
| Hurricane Festival | | 2001 |
| Lollapolooza | Main stage | 1993 (Side stage and Main stage), 1997, 2009 |
| Louder Than Life | Headline | 2023, 2026 |
| Lowlands | Headline | 1993, 2007 |
| Metaltown | Headline | 2006 |
| Mile High Music Festival | Headline | 2009 |
| Monster Mash Music Festival | Headline | 2015 |
| Northern Invasion | Headline | 2018 |
| Norwegian Wood | Headline | 2002 (didn't play since Ozzfest was canceled) |
| Nova Rock Festival | | 2006 |
| Øyafestivalen | Headline | 2007 |
| Ozzfest | Main stage | 1998, 2001, 2002, 2013 |
| Pinkpop | Main stage | 2001 (3FM Tent), 2006 |
| Popwerk | Main stage | 1993 |
| Powertrip | Metallica Support | 2023 |
| Pukkelpop | | 1993, 2007 |
| Quart Festival | Main stage | 2006 |
| Reading Festival | Main stage | 1993 |
| River's Edge | Headline | 2012 |
| Rock am Ring | Headline | 2002, 2019 |
| Rock on the Range | Headline | 2018 |
| Rock Werchter | Main stage | 1994 (Side stage), 2001, 2006, 2019 |
| Roskilde Festival | Main stage | 2001, 2006 |
| Ruisrock | Headline | 2006 |
| Super Bock Super Rock | Headline | 2006 |
| Sonic Temple Festival | Headline | 2023, 2026 |
| Southside Festival | | 2001 |
| Street Scene | Headline | 2006 |
| Summer Sonic Festival | Headline | 2006 |
| Sziget Festival | Headline | 2007 |
| Tons of Rock | Headline | 2024 |
| Voodoo Music Experience | Headline | 2001, 2016 |
| Welcome to Rockville | Headline | 2019, 2023 |
| Lollapalooza | Headline | 2025 (Argentina, Chile and Brazil) |
| Festival Estéreo Picnic | Headline | 2025 |

== Guest musicians ==
These musicians have joined Tool on stage.

| Guest musician | Instrument | Touring with | Song | Notes | Reference |
|---|---|---|---|---|---|
| Heitham Al-Sayed | Vocals | Senser, Lodestar | multiple | Joined Tool several times at their concerts in London in 1994 and 1997 for "Bottom" and "Pushit" and in Paris in 2006 for "Opiate". | |
| Mike Bordin | Drums | Ozzy Osbourne, Faith No More | "Triad" | Ozzfest at Donington Park in 2002 and again during the U.S. tour of 2002 | |
| King Buzzo | Guitar | The Melvins | multiple | "Stinkfist", covers of Ted Nugent's "Stranglehold", and Peach's "You Lied" & "Spasm" | |
| Dale Crover | Drums | The Melvins | "Opiate", "Triad" | Final show of the Ænema tour at San Jose, California on August 30, 1998; The Australian leg of Tool's 2002 tour | |
| John Dolmayan | Drums | System of a Down | multiple | Ozzfest 2002 at Antwerp and Dublin performing "Triad", both performances in Las Vegas in 2007 he joined Danny Carey in performing "Lateralus" | |
| Aloke Dutta | Tabla | N/A | "Pushit" | Tool's spring-1998 "mini-tour" | |
| Robert Fripp | Guitar | King Crimson | "Soundscapes" | Played during the intermission during the Tool/King Crimson mini-tour of 2001; On a few occasions, he was joined by Adam and Justin; sometimes remained onstage playing "Soundscape" (segues) as Tool went into the first song of the second set. | |
| Tomas Haake | Drums | Meshuggah | "Triad" | When Meshuggah supported Tool during their U.S. tour in the fall of 2002 | |
| Tricky | Keyboards; Vocals | N/A | "Reflection", "Opiate" | U.S. tour of 2001 | |
| Kirk Hammett | Guitar | Metallica | "Sober", "Lateralus" | Blaisdell Concert Hall in Hawaii, August 18, 2006 and January 14, 2011 | |
| Hawkman | Vocals | Tricky | "Reflection" | U.S. tour of 2001 | |
| Dave Lombardo | Drums | Fantômas | "Triad" | When Fantômas supported Tool during the U.S. tour of October 2001 | |
| Herman Li | Guitar | DragonForce | "Lateralus" | Played during band's 2007 appearance at Brixton Academy | |
| Pat Mastelotto | Drums | King Crimson | "Triad" | Tool/King Crimson mini-tour of 2001. On a related note, Danny Carey joined King Crimson onstage on one occasion, playing the second half of "Red" during this tour. | |
| Perry Melius | Percussion | Tricky | "Triad" | 5 Seasons Center, Cedar Rapids, Iowa (October 20, 2001) | |
| Tom Morello | Guitar | The Nightwatchman | "Lateralus" | Provided extra guitar during the band's 2007 Bonnaroo appearance. | |
| Mike Patton | Synthesizer | Tomahawk, Fantômas | "Triad" | U.S. tour of 2002 | |
| Scott Reeder | Bass guitar | Kyuss | "Demon Cleaner" | Concerts in Los Angeles (March 27, 1998) and San Diego (March 29, 1998) | |
| Zack de la Rocha | Vocals | Rage Against the Machine | "Bottom" | Tool concerts in Irvindale, California on August 7, 1993, and Paris, France on September 9, 1993 | |
| Chris Pitman | Vocals | Guns N' Roses, ZAUM | "Bottom" | Concert in Ventura, California on December 15, 1995 || | |
| Layne Staley | Vocals | Alice in Chains | "Opiate" | Lollapalooza concerts in Houston (July 31, 1993) and Dallas (August 1, 1993), at The Big Mele Music Festival at Kualoa Ranch, HI on August 15, 1993, a Tool's concert at Bremerton, WA on May 28 and a fundraiser concert at The Palladium, Hollywood, CA on July 1, 1994. | |
| John Stanier | Drums | Tomahawk | "Triad" | U.S. tour of 2002 | |
| Statik | Machines | Collide | "Triad" | multiple occasions | |
| Phil Campbell | Guitar | Motörhead | "Sober" | Arena Leipzig on December 5, 2006 | |
| Brann Dailor | Drums | Mastodon | "Lateralus" | 10,000 Days tour, June 4, 2007 Duluth GA (USA) and September 2, 2007 Athens (GRE) | |
| Brent Hinds | Guitar | Mastodon | "Lateralus" | 10,000 Days tour, Athens | |
| Bill Kelliher | Guitar | Mastodon | "Lateralus" | 10,000 Days tour, Athens | |
| Troy Sanders | Bass guitar | Mastodon | "Lateralus" | 10,000 Days tour, Athens | |
| Serj Tankian | Vocals | System of a Down | "Sober" | Big Day Out 2007, Auckland | |
| Trey Gunn | Bass | TU | "Lateralus" | 10,000 Days tour, Texas | |
| Pat Mastelotto | Drums | TU | "Lateralus" | 10,000 Days tour, Texas | |
| Terry Bozzio | Drums | N/A | "Lateralus" | 10,000 Days tour, Austin, Texas, on November 14, 2007 | |
| Sebastian Thomson | Drums | Trans Am | "Lateralus" | 10,000 Days tour, Victoria BC on December 1, 2007 | |
| Jello Biafra | Vocals | Dead Kennedys | "Holiday in Cambodia" | 10,000 Days tour, San Francisco on December 11, 2007 | |
| Tim Alexander | Drums | Primus | "Opiate", "Lateralus" | Final show of the Ænema tour at San Jose, California on August 30, 1998; 10,000 Days tour, San Francisco on December 11, 2007 | |
| Till Lindemann | Pyrotechnics | Rammstein | "Lateralus" | Big Day Out, Adelaide, February 4, 2011 | |
| Christoph Schneider | Drums | Rammstein | "Lateralus" | Big Day Out, Adelaide, February 4, 2011 | |
| Angelo Moore | Vocals | Fishbone | "Bottom" | Live in Grenoble, France on October 6, 1993 | |
| Jason Reece and Aaron Ford | Percussions | Trail of Dead | "Lateralus" | 10,000 Days tour, Bologna, Italy on September 2, 2007 | |
| Alex Lifeson | Guitar | Rush | "Jambi" | Fear Inoculum tour, Toronto, Ontario, Canada on November 20 & 21, 2023 | |
| Billy Strings | Guitar | N/A | "Jambi" "The Grudge" | Fear Inoculum tour, Salt Lake City on October 11, 2023 and Nashville on January 23, 2024 | |
| Jéssica di Falchi | Guitar | N/A | "Jambi" | Lollapalooza Brazil on March 30, 2025 | |

== See also ==
- List of Billboard Boxscore number-one concert series of the 2020s
