= Totally Bill Hicks =

- DVD cover
- Directed by: Rupert Edwards, Chris Bould
- Produced by: Tiger Aspect Productions
- Starring: Bill Hicks
- Release date: 1994
- Country: United States
- Language: English

Totally Bill Hicks is a video, originally released in 1994, documenting the life and comedy of Bill Hicks. It consists of two parts: Revelations, a recording of his last live performance in the United Kingdom made at the Dominion Theatre, and It's Just A Ride, a documentary about Hicks' life which features interviews with friends, admirers, and family.

In 2002 it became the first of Hicks' videos to be released on DVD, prompting one critic to comment on how topical the comedian's material had remained. His joke about the Bush administration learning about Iraq's weapons of mass destruction "by looking at the receipt" was made in the context of the Gulf War, but was equally relevant in the run up to the 2003 invasion of Iraq.

The contents of this release was later included in the 2004 DVD Compilation Bill Hicks Live: Satirist, Social Critic, Stand Up Comedian along with One Night Stand and Relentless, and as part of the 2015 Bill Hicks: The Complete Collection Box Set.
