= Sacred Cow Productions =

Production company

Sacred Cow Productions is a production company founded by filmmaker and author Kevin Booth and the late comedian Bill Hicks. SCP has produced videos and albums of comedians such as Hicks himself, Joe Rogan and Doug Stanhope, hard-hitting subjects like the drug wars, and controversial subject matter such as Waco siege and the September 11 attacks.

== Overview ==
Sacred Cow Productions is a privately held organization, run by Kevin Booth. It is located in Studio City, California.

== Productions ==
Sacred Cow Productions produced the following films and videos:

Year	Film	Type
2019	Shadows of Sofia	documentary
2013	American Drug War 2: Cannabis Destiny	documentary
2010	How Weed Won the West	documentary
2007	American Drug War: The Last White Hope	documentary
2005	Martial Law 9/11: Rise of the Police State	documentary
2004	American Dictators	TV documentary
2002	Doug Stanhope: Word of Mouth	video
2001	Joe Rogan: Live from the Belly of the Beast	video
2000	The Best of Alex Jones	video documentary
1996	Dwight Slade: Willy's Footsteps	video
1993	On the Seventh Day in Waco	video documentary
1993	Bill Hicks: United States of Advertising	video
1993	Counts of the Netherworld	TV movie
1993	Sacred Cow Halloween Special	video
1993	Sea Man	video documentary short
1991	Ninja Bachelor Party	short
1989	Bill Hicks: Sane Man	video documentary

They were also distributors of How Weed Won the West and American Drug War: The Last White Hope.
