= LAMC =

LAMC may refer to:

- "L.A.M.C.", a song on the Tool album Salival
- Latin Alternative Music Conference
- Letterman Army Medical Center
- Los Angeles Memorial Coliseum, a stadium in Los Angeles, USA
- Los Angeles Mission College, a public community college in Los Angeles, USA
