= Shock and Awe (album) =

Live album by Bill Hicks
- Released: July 29, 2003
- Recorded: November 11, 1992, Oxford Playhouse, Oxford, England
- Genre: Comedy
- Length: 63:59
- Label: Invasion

Bill Hicks chronology
Flying Saucer Tour Vol. 1 (2002)	Shock and Awe (2003)	Salvation (2005)

Professional ratings
Review scores
Source	Rating
Allmusic	link

Shock and Awe is a live recording posthumously released by stand-up comedian and satirist Bill Hicks in 2003 on New York-based Invasion Records. It was recorded at the Oxford Playhouse, and is an abridged version of the album Salvation.

== Track listing ==
1. "Hello Oxford" 10:30
2. "Jimmy White" 1:02
3. "Hooligans" 2:54
4. "Sniper's Nest" 2:30
5. "More about Smoking" 2:23
6. "Vote for Labour" 3:37
7. "Madonna's Sex Book" 1:03
8. "English Porno" 2:06
9. "Basic Instinct" 5:56
10. "Back to Bed America" 3:45
11. "Christians for the Death Penalty" 2:37
12. "Wrong Crowd?" 1:21
13. "Satan Starmaker" 3:01
14. "I Love Film" 2:44
15. "Children" 4:24
16. "Back in My Room" 1:52
17. "American Horseshit" 1:22
18. "I Need to Get Laid" 2:58
19. "On the Bright Side" 3:17
20. "Fuck Artists Only" 2:34
21. "Is There a Message" 2:43

== Album credits ==
- Engineering by Michael Fossenkemper
