= Dangerous (Bill Hicks album) =

Live album by Bill Hicks
- Released: 1990
- Venue: Caroline's Seaport and Village Gate, New York City
- Genre: Comedy
- Length: 54:21
- Label: Invasion
- Producer: Peter Casperson

Bill Hicks chronology
Dangerous (1990)	Relentless (1992)

Professional ratings
Review scores
Source	Rating
AllMusic	4.5/5 stars

Dangerous is the first live album by American stand-up comedian and satirist Bill Hicks, released in 1990 by Invasion Records. Much of the material was previously performed in Hicks' Sane Man special in 1989.

Hicks explained the title to the Los Angeles Times by referencing a quote he attributed to Thomas Jefferson, although the veracity of the quote is not confirmed.

[Jefferson's] quote was "No idea is dangerous to society wherein that idea can be openly discussed." That's why the album is called "Dangerous," because I'm discussing drugs and things drugs do.

In 1997, Rykodisc issued remastered versions of both Dangerous and its follow-up, Relentless (1992), on CD, as well as the posthumous albums Arizona Bay and Rant in E-Minor.

== Track listing ==
No.	Title	Length
1.	"Modern Bummer"	6:34
2.	"Flying Saucer Tour"	3:21
3.	"Smoking"	5:30
4.	"We Live in a World..."	10:51
5.	"The War on Drugs"	9:14
6.	"Burning Issues"	4:00
7.	"I Love My Job"	1:33
8.	"My Parents"	5:26
9.	"Please Do Not Disturb"	7:02
10.	"The Vision"	0:58
Total length:		54:21

== Personnel ==
- Bill Hicks – performer

Technical

- Peter Casperson – producer, executive producer
- Matt Hathaway – engineer
- Nancy Albino – engineer
- Sam Smith – editing assistant
- Joel Soyffer – mixing, editing
- Andre Roquette – technical assistant
- Steve Rosenthal – technical assistant
- Hell's Kitchen Grafix – design
- Graham Haber – cover photo
- Bill Scheft – introduction
- Jack Mondrus – direction
