= Love All the People =

Book by Bill Hicks

Love All The People: Letters, Lyrics, Routines
- First edition (UK)
- Author: Bill Hicks, John Lahr
- Language: English
- Genre: Comedy, Biographical
- Publisher: Constable & Robinson
- Publication date: 2004
- Media type: Print
- Pages: 308 (1st edition) 325 (2nd edition)

Love All The People: Letters, Lyrics, Routines is a posthumously released collection of routines, letters and lyrics by American comedian Bill Hicks.

== Synopsis ==
The book is a chronological selection of his works from throughout his career, presenting the gradual evolution of his attitudes and style, with a foreword from John Lahr. The book is split into four sections. The first section covers the years 1980–1991, the second section covers 1992, the third covers early to mid-1993, and the fourth covers late 1993–1994.

== Publication ==
It was published in February 2004 in the UK (ISBN 1-84119-878-1), and November 2004 in the US (ISBN 1-932360-65-4). In May 2005 a second expanded edition was published.

== Reception ==
Critical reception for Love All The People was positive. The Guardian reviewed both the original and expanded versions of the collection, both praising it for its humor and lyrics.
