= Salvation (Bill Hicks album) =

Live album by Bill Hicks
- Released: November 8, 2005
- Recorded: November 11, 1992, Oxford Playhouse, Oxford, England
- Genre: Comedy
- Length: 1:54:27
- Label: Rykodisc

Bill Hicks chronology
Shock and Awe (2003)	Salvation (2005)

Professional ratings
Review scores
Source	Rating
PopMatters	8/10 stars

Salvation is a two-disc live album by stand-up comedian and satirist Bill Hicks posthumously released in 2005 on Rykodisc. It was recorded at the Oxford Playhouse and is an unabridged version of Shock and Awe.

== Track listing ==
=== Disc one ===
1. "Intro" (0:55)
2. "Ding Dong" (10:21)
3. "Puppet People" (13:13)
4. "Kennedy and the Warren Commission" (3:10)
5. "Smoking" (3:44)
6. "Polls" (3:59)
7. "Dick Jokes" (7:11)
8. "News/Movies/Religion" (13:57)

=== Disc two ===
1. "Religion/Drugs" (23:51)
2. "Film" (3:03)
3. "Kids" (5:00)
4. "Fries" (2:54)
5. "Backed Up" (12:20)
6. "Sleep and the Message" (10:49)
