= Philosophy: The Best of Bill Hicks =

Greatest hits album by Bill Hicks
- Released: September 18, 2001
- Recorded: 1990–1993
- Genre: Stand-up comedy
- Length: 71:13
- Label: Rykodisc

Bill Hicks chronology
Rant in E-Minor (1997)	Philosophy: The Best of Bill Hicks (2001)	Love, Laughter and Truth (2002)

Professional ratings
Review scores
Source	Rating
AllMusic	4.5/5 stars

Philosophy: The Best of Bill Hicks is a compilation album of routines by the American stand-up comedian and satirist Bill Hicks, released by Rykodisc in 2001.

== Track listing ==
1. "Greetings" (1:16)
2. "Flying Saucer Tour" (3:19)
3. "Please Do Not Disturb" (6:58)
4. "Gays in the Military" (2:27)
5. "Smoking" (5:31)
6. "Great Times on Drugs" (10:46)
7. "Sex on Trial" (3:07)
8. "What Is Pornography?" (3:33)
9. "Save Willie" (1:06)
10. "Confession Time (Cops)" (4:24)
11. "Step on the Gas (L.A. Riots)" (4:49)
12. "Hooligans" (3:58)
13. "Politics in America" (0:38)
14. "The Elite" (1:03)
15. "Time to Evolve" (2:58)
16. "Odd Beliefs" (0:48)
17. "Dinosaurs in the Bible" (5:56)
18. "Easter" (1:18)
19. "Gideons" (1:04)
20. "Your Children Aren't Special" (3:16)
21. "The Sanctity of Life" (2:58)
