= Love, Laughter and Truth =

Compilation album by Bill Hicks
- Released: November 12, 2002
- Recorded: 1990–93
- Genre: Stand-up comedy
- Length: 43:56
- Label: Rykodisc
- Producer: Mary Reese Hicks, Jeff Rougvie

Bill Hicks chronology
Philosophy: The Best of Bill Hicks (2001)	Love, Laughter and Truth (2002)	Flying Saucer Tour Vol. 1 (2003)

Professional ratings
Review scores
Source	Rating
AllMusic	link
Popmatters	(favorable) link
Pitchfork Media	(8.4/10) link

Love, Laughter and Truth is a compilation album consisting of previously unreleased material by American stand-up comedian and satirist Bill Hicks, released by Rykodisc in 2002. The material on the album was originally recorded by Hicks himself for personal use but was reviewed after his death by the Hicks Estate, after which it was decided to release the previously unreleased bits on this album. The material comes from recordings made from 1990-93 in Denver, San Ramon, West Palm Beach, San Francisco and Pittsburgh.

== Sound quality ==
The album is plagued by poor sound quality. This is due to the poor equipment that was used for many of the recordings and the lack of volume adjustments while recording. Before releasing the album, careful remastering was done. For instance, more than 120 pops were removed and seven sections de-hissed. Still, poor sound and volume variations between tracks can easily be heard.

== Title ==
The title of the album comes from the last words of Hicks before he died. He had written in a letter, "I left in love, in laughter, and in truth, and wherever truth, love and laughter abide, I am there in spirit."

== Track listing ==
1. "Intro/Smokers vs. Drinkers" – 1:33
2. "Drunk Driving" – 6:53
3. "New York Apartment" – 1:53
4. "My One Man Show" – 1:32
5. "Pot Smoking" – 1:11
6. "Drugs Are Bad" – 3:14
7. "Children on Airplanes" – 3:52
8. "50 Year Smoker" – 1:37
9. "Smoking in Heaven" – 3:57
10. "Australia" – 2:18
11. "Satiating the American Comedy Audience" – 0:44
12. "Dance Club" – 1:44
13. "Speaking of Homosexuality" – 2:32
14. "Poe-Naw-Grah-Fee" – 1:46
15. "A Question for the Ladies" – 4:33
16. "My Favorite New Kid" – 1:07
17. "You Can't Get Bitter" – 2:53
18. "Closing Bit" – 0:27
