= American: The Bill Hicks Story =

- Film poster
- Directed by: Matt Harlock; Paul Thomas
- Produced by: Matt Harlock; Paul Thomas
- Edited by: Matt Harlock; Paul Thomas
- Music by: Mark Daniels
- Production company: American the Movie
- Distributed by: Variance Films
- Release dates: 23 October 2009 (London); 14 May 2010 (United Kingdom)
- Running time: 102 minutes
- Country: United Kingdom
- Language: English

American: The Bill Hicks Story is a 2009 biographical documentary film on the life of comedian Bill Hicks. The film was produced by Matt Harlock and Paul Thomas, and features archival footage and interviews with family and friends, including Kevin Booth.

The filmmakers used a cut-and-paste animation technique to add movement to a large collection of still pictures used to document events in Hicks' life.

== Release ==
The film made its North American premiere at the 2010 South by Southwest Film Festival.

== Reception ==
=== Critical response ===
On Rotten Tomatoes, 82% of the 55 reviews were rated positive. The critical consensus was: "A treasure trove of archival material and interviews, American: The Bill Hicks Story is an exuberant celebration about a unique, sorely missed voice in comedy."

=== Accolades ===
American was nominated for a 2010 Grierson British Documentary Award for the "Most Entertaining Documentary" category. It was also nominated for Best Graphics and Animation category in the 2011 Cinema Eye Awards. Awards won include The Dallas Film Festivals Texas Filmmaker Award, at Little Rock The Oxford American's Best Southern Film Award, at Biografilm, Bologna, Italy The Lancia Award and Best Documentary at the Downtown LA Film Festival.
