= Ænima =

- Digital cover. The original CD release has a lenticular jewel case which makes the album appear to be moving.

Studio album by Tool
- Released: September 17, 1996
- Studios: Ocean Way (Hollywood, California); The Hook (North Hollywood, California)
- Genres: Alternative metal; progressive metal
- Length: 77:18
- Labels: Zoo; Volcano
- Producers: Tool; David Bottrill

Tool chronology
Undertow (1993)	Ænima (1996)	Salival (2000)

Singles from Ænima
- 1. "Stinkfist" Released: 1996

Ænima (/ˈɑːnɪmə/ AH-ni-mə) is the second studio album by the American rock band Tool. It was released on vinyl on September 17, 1996, and on cassette and compact disc on October 1, 1996, through Zoo and Volcano Entertainment. Produced by the band and David Bottrill, the album was recorded at Ocean Way Recording in Hollywood and The Hook in North Hollywood. It is the first album by Tool to feature bassist Justin Chancellor, who replaced original bassist Paul D'Amour the year prior.

The album debuted at No. 2 on the Billboard 200 chart upon its initial release, selling 148,000 copies in its first week. It was certified triple platinum by the RIAA on March 4, 2003. The album appeared on lists of the best albums of 1996 in Kerrang! and Terrorizer. The track "Ænema" won the Grammy Award for Best Metal Performance in 1998. In 2003, Ænima was ranked the sixth most influential album of all time by Kerrang! In 2017, Rolling Stone listed the album at No. 18 on its list of "The 100 Greatest Metal Albums of All Time".

== Background ==
Ænima is Tool's first studio album with former Peach bassist Justin Chancellor.

The title Ænima is a combination of the words 'anima' (Latin for 'soul' and associated with the ideas of "life force", and a term often used by psychologist Carl Jung) and 'enema', the medical procedure involving the injection of fluids into the rectum.

"Stinkfist" was the album's only song to be commercially released as a single. A music video was released for it. Promotional singles were issued, in order of release, for "H.", "Ænema", "Forty Six & 2" and "Eulogy", with just the second receiving a music video.

Several of the songs are short segues or interludes that connect to longer songs, pushing the total duration of the CD towards the maximum of around 80 minutes. These segues are "Useful Idiot", "Message to Harry Manback", "Intermission", "Die Eier von Satan", "Cesaro Summability", and "(-) Ions".

== Lyrics and themes ==
The liner notes included references to dissociative anesthesia through ketamine as well as Timothy Leary, "futants", ritual magic, and religious fundamentalism. The band dedicated the album to comedian Bill Hicks, who they felt was going in the same direction as them, and said this album was partly inspired by him. The inside cover displays art featuring a painting of a disabled patient that shows a resemblance to singer Maynard James Keenan and Bill Hicks depicted as a doctor or "healer" with the line, "Another Dead Hero".

Bassist Paul D'Amour worked on "H.", as he is credited as a co-songwriter on ASCAP's website.

Speculation has surrounded the song "H." The "meaning" of this song has seldom been detailed by the band, as they do not regularly comment on such matters. However, on several occasions, specifically on November 23, 1996, during a show at the Electric Factory in Philadelphia, Keenan did grant some insight into the meaning of the song. Speaking to the audience, he said, "Any of you ever seen those old Warner Bros. cartoons? Sometimes there's that one where the guy is trying to make a decision, and he's got an angel on one shoulder and the devil on the other. Seems pretty obvious, right? The angel is trying to give him good advice while the devil is trying to get him to do what's bad for him. It's not always that simple, though. A lot of times they're not really angels or devils, but friends giving you advice, looking out for your best interest but not really understanding what's going to be best for you. So it kind of comes down to you. You have to make the decision yourself. This song is called 'H.'" The song was discussed live during a few other shows around this time, one example being on February 23, 1997, when Keenan introduced this song by referring to the shoulder angel and devil, and also said it is about a hurtful yet dependent relationship. In an interview Keenan gave in December 1996, he commented, "My son's name is Devo H. That's all I'll say." It is also of note that the song's working title was "Half Empty", as it was introduced during a mini-tour of California by the band in December 1995.

The track "Useful Idiot" features the sound of the needle skipping at the end of a gramophone record growing louder as the track progresses. The track was set at the end of side 1 of the vinyl versions of Ænima as a joke to fool those who owned the version. The song (on vinyl) not only ends in a locked groove, which requires manual lifting of the needle to end playback, but also continues on the run-in groove of side 2.

"Message to Harry Manback" features calming piano music and the background noises of seagulls while a profanity-laden message from an answering machine plays. The message was left by an uninvited Italian houseguest of acquaintance of a former Keenan's housemate, who was irritated at being kicked out of the house. The name "Harry Manback" is a reference to a comedy routine by Bill Hicks. A follow-up message from the same guest became "Message to Harry Manback II", found on Salival, which features strings instead of piano.

"Hooker with a Penis" refers to a fan who accused the band of selling out after their first EP. "OGT" is taken to stand for "Original Gangster Tool". Keenan whispers in the left channel throughout the song. At 1:41, "consume, be fruitful, and multiply" may be alluding to Genesis, which contains the phrase "be fruitful and multiply" six times. During Lollapalooza 1997, a version of "Hooker with a Penis" remixed by Billy Howerdel in the form of lounge music played over the public address system between sets.

During 1996 concerts, Keenan told audiences that the song "Jimmy" is the sequel to "Prison Sex", and how it is about getting through the abuse. It is preceded by "Intermission", a short organ adaptation of the opening riff of "Jimmy".

The fourth segue is "Die Eier von Satan". It is introduced by a distorted bassline giving way to a heavy guitar, starting at the :23 mark and lasting only ten seconds, playing a single chord in Drop C tuning over a reversed drum beat in 9/8 meter. The lyrics are performed in German by Marko Fox, bass player for ZAUM and SexTapes. He is backed by a sound that resembles a hydraulic press, and crowd cheering and applause that increase in volume as the lyrics are read with increasing ferocity, with the greatest emphasis on the line "Und Keine Eier" ("And no eggs") which is repeated like a catchphrase. These combined effects make the song sound like a militant German rant or Nazi rally. While the tone is aggressive, the speaker is merely reciting a recipe for a Mexican wedding cookie. The song was originally translated by Gudrun Fox. According to Blair McKenzie Blake, the maintainer of Tool's official website, "Die Eier von Satan" originally were cookies that "Marko Fox's grandmother used to bake for him as a child, without using eggs as an ingredient. The substitution for eggs is a magical incantation from the worm-eaten pages of some moldering grimoire." This magical incantation ("sim salabim bamba sala do saladim") is taken from the German children's song "Auf einem Baum ein Kuckuck" and popularized by Harry August Jansen. According to the lyrics, the special ingredient besides this "incantation" is "a knife-tip of Turkish hashish". The title is a play on deviled eggs, translating to "The eggs of Satan" in English or "The balls of Satan", due to a German double entendre of "Eier". So far the only time it has been performed live in its entirety was on December 19, 1996, at the Universal Amphitheatre in Los Angeles. The track has been compared to the works of industrial and experimental artists such as Einstürzende Neubauten and Tom Waits.

"Pushit" was titled as a single word to emphasize the ambiguity of the pronunciation in regard to the "s" word (push it on me/push shit on me). An alternate version of "Pushit" was performed live, including an Aloke Dutta tabla solo, and appears on Salival.

The song "Third Eye" contains samples of comedian Bill Hicks. The title may be a reference to Hicks' assertions that psilocybe mushrooms could be used to "squeegee [one's] third eye clean." A goal of the album as a whole was to "open people up in some way and help open their third eye and help them on a path."

"Ænema"
The chorus and the lyrics in this clip of "Ænema" makes reference to the title track from Bill Hicks's extended Arizona Bay album.

"Ænema" makes lyrical references to Bill Hicks' set Arizona Bay, in which the San Andreas Fault collapses, purging the continent of Southern California and the Baja Peninsula which would give Arizona its own oceanfront. This is further illustrated in the lenticular map under the CD tray. The alternate spelling for the song emphasizes the "enema" portion of the combined title also used for the album; in this way, it differentiates the meaning of the song (with California's collapse seen as a 'flushing out' for the country) from the meaning of the album (the "anima" emphasis indicating a spiritual, Jungian focus for the album in its entirety) while retaining the song's placement as the title track, though the differing spelling and pronunciation marks a different approach from other Tool albums that are named directly after songs (Opiate, Undertow, Lateralus and Fear Inoculum) or sections of songs (10,000 Days).

== Artwork ==
The packaging for Ænima was nominated for the Grammy Award for Best Recording Package. North American pressings of the album were packaged in a custom lenticular jewel case (called a "Multi-Image CD case" in the liner notes) for the cover and interior disc tray. The cover art and other images in the liner notes can be set behind the lenticular "lens" to create an effect of sequential animation. European pressings of the CD featured a standard case, and the insert contained a catalog of sixteen fictional and humorously titled "other albums available by Tool".

The special images used for the lenticular effect are:

- Cam de Leon's painting Smoke Box, with animated smoke and encompassing eyes.
- A touched-up version of Cam de Leon's painting Ocular Orifice, with the pupil of the eye animated to rotate completely around.
- A photo of contortionist Alana Cain with her legs wrapped behind her head appearing to be performing cunnilingus on herself. Shown sitting on a couch to the right are Danny Carey (nude) and Justin Chancellor. Adam Jones is squatting next to them while Maynard James Keenan, also nude, gets up to throw a single rose on the ground in front of Cain with his left hand covering his genitals. Another image of the contortionist can be seen on the disc itself.
- An image of California before and after a major earthquake is shown in the tray behind where the disc lies – a reference to the song "Ænema" and the Arizona Bay sketch by Bill Hicks. The inlay image of the US incorrectly depicts the Oklahoma Panhandle with Cimarron County being in the state of Texas. It is unknown whether or not this was intentional.

== Release and reception ==
Professional ratings
Review scores
Source	Rating
AllMusic	5/5 stars
Collector's Guide to Heavy Metal	8/10
Encyclopedia of Popular Music	4/5 stars
Entertainment Weekly	A−
Houston Chronicle	4/5 stars
Los Angeles Times	3.5/4 stars
Pitchfork	7.9/10 (2000); 8.7/10 (2026)
The Rolling Stone Album Guide	2.5/5 stars
Spin	5/10
USA Today	3/4 stars

Upon its release, Ænima was met with generally favorable reviews by mainstream music critics, citing the band's innovation and ambitions within the album's sound. Jon Wiederhorn of Entertainment Weekly said that it was "one of 1996's strangest and strongest alt-metal records", while USA Today's Edna Gundersen wrote that "Tool moves to the front of the alterna-metal shop on its third and best release". Los Angeles Times writer Sandy Masuo found that the band had successfully incorporated exotic instrumentation and sampling into their "raw, gripping rock" to give it "an even more exhilarating edge". David Fricke of Rolling Stone said that Tool "shove their iron-spike riffing and shock-therapy polemics right up the claustrophobic dead end of so-called alternative metal in the name of a greater metaphysical glory", calling the album "very admirable" and "even a bit impressive". In a retrospective review of Ænima, AllMusic writer Rob Theakston stated that on the album, "Tool explore the progressive rock territory previously forged by such bands as King Crimson. However, Tool are conceptually innovative with every minute detail of their art, which sets them apart from most bands".

Among mixed reviews, Chuck Eddy of Spin found that while Jones had progressed as a guitarist, Keenan's vocal range remained limited: "[He] only knows how to get intense by turning ugly; his vocals stretch only toward bullying low notes. In his upper register, instead of soaring, he settles for just mumbling blandly". Greg Kot, writing in The New Rolling Stone Album Guide, found it inferior to later Tool albums: "With Ænima, the band's ambitions nearly get the best of them. The increasing density of their relentlessly downcast music, augmented by occasional electronic noises, begins to feel ponderous. 'I've been wallowing in my own chaotic insecure delusions,' Maynard James Keenan mutters, and the music indulges him. The claustrophobic production doesn't help." Robert Christgau of The Village Voice dismissed Ænima as a "dud", later describing it and the band as "stupidity posing as underground".

=== Accolades ===
The album appeared on lists of the best albums of 1996 in Kerrang! and Terrorizer. The track "Ænema" won the Grammy Award for Best Metal Performance in 1998. In 2003, Ænima was ranked the 6th most influential album of all time by Kerrang! In 2006, it placed 14th on a Guitar World readers poll that attempted to find the best 100 guitar albums. In 2014, readers of Rhythm voted it the third greatest drumming album in the history of progressive rock. In 2025, it was ranked by Loudwire as the 9th best progressive metal album of the 1990s. In 2026, Ænima was ranked No. 4 on Consequence's list of the top 60 albums of 1996.

== Track listing ==
All tracks are written by Maynard James Keenan, Adam Jones, Danny Carey and Justin Chancellor, unless otherwise noted.

No.	Title	Writer(s)	Length
1.	"Stinkfist"	Keenan; Jones; Carey; Paul D'Amour	5:11
2.	"Eulogy"	Keenan; Jones; Carey; D'Amour	8:28
3.	"H."	Keenan; Jones; Carey; D'Amour	6:07
4.	"Useful Idiot"		0:38
5.	"Forty Six & 2"		6:04
6.	"Message to Harry Manback"		1:53
7.	"Hooker with a Penis"		4:33
8.	"Intermission"		0:56
9.	"Jimmy"		5:24
10.	"Die Eier von Satan"		2:17
11.	"Pushit"	Keenan; Jones; Carey; D'Amour	9:55
12.	"Cesaro Summability"		1:26
13.	"Ænema"		6:39
14.	"(-) Ions"		4:00
15.	"Third Eye"		13:47
Total length:			77:18

Notes

- "Jimmy" is stylized in all lowercase in the liner notes.
- Die Eier von Satan means: "The Eggs of Satan" or "The Balls of Satan" in German.
- Bill Hicks – audio sampled on "Third Eye".

== Personnel ==
Tool

- Maynard James Keenan – vocals
- Adam Jones – guitars
- Justin Chancellor – bass
- Danny Carey – drums, percussion, samples

Additional personnel

- David Bottrill – keyboards on "Message to Harry Manback"
- Eban Schletter – organ on "Intermission"
- Marko Fox – vocals on "Die Eier von Satan"
- Chris Pitman – additional synthesizer on "Third Eye"

Production

- Tool – production, art concept
- David Bottrill – production, engineering, mixing
- Alana Cain – model (contortionist)
- Cam de Leon – computer illustrations
- Gudrun Fox – translation of "Die Eier von Satan"
- Concetta Halstead – design and production
- DZN – design and production
- Billy Howerdel – guitar tech, equipment consultant
- Bruce Jacoby – drum tech
- Jeff Novack – photographs
- Fabrico DiSanto – photo assistance
- Mark Rappaport – effects consultant
- Adam Jones – artwork direction and production
- Kevin Willis – artwork direction and production, Bill Hicks painting

== Charts ==
=== Weekly charts ===
Chart (1996)	Peak position
Australian Albums (ARIA)	6
German Albums (Offizielle Top 100)	75
New Zealand Albums (RMNZ)	1
Norwegian Albums (VG-lista)	36
Swedish Albums (Sverigetopplistan)	53
UK Albums (Official Charts)	108
US Billboard 200	2
Chart (2001)	Peak position
Dutch Albums (Album Top 100)	75
Chart (2019)	Peak position
Belgian Albums (Ultratop Flanders)	22
Irish Albums (IRMA)	92
Portuguese Albums (AFP)	47
US Billboard 200	10
US Top Rock Albums (Billboard)	1

=== Year-end charts ===
Chart (1996)	Position
US Billboard 200	169
Chart (1997)	Position
Australian Albums (ARIA)	54
New Zealand Albums (RMNZ)	15
US Billboard 200	72
Chart (1998)	Position
US Billboard 200	180
Chart (2002)	Position
Canadian Alternative Albums (Nielsen SoundScan)	197
Chart (2019)	Position
US Top Rock Albums (Billboard)	72

== Certifications ==
Region	Certification	Certified units/sales
Australia (ARIA)	3× Platinum	210,000^{‡}
Canada (Music Canada)	3× Platinum	300,000^{‡}
New Zealand (RMNZ)	2× Platinum	30,000^{‡}
United Kingdom (BPI)	Gold	100,000^{‡}
United States (RIAA)	3× Platinum	3,000,000^{^}
^{^} Shipments figures based on certification alone.^{‡} Sales+streaming figures based on certification alone.
