= Salival =

Box set by Tool
- Released: December 12, 2000
- Recorded: 1992–1998
- Venues: Salt Lake City, Utah; Portland, Oregon; San Diego, California; Denver, Colorado
- Studios: The Loft, Hollywood, California; Ocean Way, Hollywood, California
- Genres: Progressive metal; progressive rock; alternative metal
- Length: 73:57
- Labels: Volcano II; Tool Dissectional
- Producers: Tool; David Bottrill

Tool chronology
Ænima (1996)	Salival (2000)	Lateralus (2001)

Professional ratings
Aggregate scores
Source	Rating
Metacritic	61/100
Review scores
Source	Rating
AllMusic	(CD/VHS)
AllMusic	(CD/DVD)
Dotmusic	3/5 stars
Rolling Stone	3.5/5 stars
The Rolling Stone Album Guide	3/5 stars
Wall of Sound	(70/100)

Salival is a live, outtake, and video album, released as a limited edition box set in CD/VHS and CD/DVD formats in 2000 by American rock band Tool. It includes a 56-page book of photos and stills from their music videos.

== Background ==
The live track "You Lied" is a cover of a song by bass player Justin Chancellor's previous band Peach. The cover of Led Zeppelin's "No Quarter" was originally planned to be used for the soundtrack to Private Parts, but Tool subsequently decided against allowing it to be used, leading to criticism from Howard Stern, who had previously endorsed the band.

Salival is the second and final official Tool release (as of 2026) to feature a substantial amount of live material (Tool's other official live release, consisting of songs primarily from Lollapalooza '93, is available on the out-of-print Sober – Tales from the Darkside). The tracks were recorded from several different shows prior to Salival's release in 2000; however, because the booklet merely lists locations without date information, the exact sources are unconfirmed. Likely candidates for most of the recordings are the 1998 summer tour, though the San Diego recording could be "Third Eye," "Pushit" or "Merkaba" from spring 1997.

Live versions of the Ænima tracks "Pushit" and "Third Eye" appear on this album plus a live version of the Opiate song "Part of Me". The live instrumental song "Merkaba" was originally an intro for "Sober" when played live, however no tracks from Undertow properly appear here in live form. The name "Merkaba" or Merkabah translating to "Mer-Light", "Ka-Spirit", "Ba-Body" is the divine light vehicle allegedly used by ascended masters to connect with and reach those in tune with the higher realms. A reference to the Merkabah school of Jewish mysticism as it relates to new age meditation. "Message to Harry Manback II", "No Quarter", and "LAMC" were recorded during the sessions for Ænima though they were slightly re-recorded before being released on Salival.

As with other releases, there were rumors during the Salival period. Most notably, the band was said to be breaking up. Maynard James Keenan said, "we mentioned some song titles and some dickhead went out and reserved all of the .com and .org names."

== Artwork and packaging ==
The album is packaged in a black box sized 8.25" × 6.75" × 2" featuring the "Salival man" with outstretched arms. It is contained within a translucent slipcase that features the band's logo on the front. The front of the book included with the package has a small glossy square on its front. Upon initial release, the package came with two stickers on the cover; one announcing that the "new studio album" was due to arrive in stores on April 17, 2001, Maynard's 37th birthday, though it was ultimately pushed back to May 15. The other sticker, a Parental Advisory, would be the fourth and last one to appear on a Tool release.

The audio CD portion of the album is contained within a disc tray at the back of the 56-page book, which has similar dimensions to and is only slightly larger than a standard CD jewel case.

=== Album typos ===
The first pressings of Salival contain typographical errors, as well as the VHS edition having red tape. Later editions do not have these typos. The following typos are found in the CD booklet.

- Aloke Dutta and Paul D'Amour's names are misspelled as Aloke Dutto and Paul D'Mour.
- "Stinkfist" is listed as "Stink Fist."
- "Message to Harry Manback II" is spelled "Messege to Harry Manback II."
- The playing order of the videos on the VHS are listed in reverse chronological order.
- The track ordering of "Merkaba" and "You Lied" is incorrect.

A typographical error made it into VHS Version 61422-31158-2R; Stinkfist was spelled 'Stinkfest' on the label sticker.

== Track listing ==
All tracks are written by Maynard James Keenan, Adam Jones, Danny Carey and Justin Chancellor, unless otherwise noted.

CD
No.	Title	Writer(s)	Length
1.	"Third Eye" (live)		14:05
2.	"Part of Me" (live)	Keenan; Jones; Carey; Paul D'Amour	3:32
3.	"Pushit" (live)	Keenan; Jones; Carey; D'Amour	14:56
4.	"Message to Harry Manback II"		1:14
5.	"You Lied" (Peach cover; live)	Simon Oakes	9:18
6.	"Merkaba" (live)		9:48
7.	"No Quarter" (Led Zeppelin cover)	Jimmy Page; Robert Plant; John Paul Jones	11:28
8.	"L.A.M.C." (ends at 6:44, a hidden song entitled "Maynard's Dick" starts at 7:09, after 25 seconds of silence)		10:54
Total length:			73:57

DVD/VHS
No.	Title	Length
1.	"Ænema"	6:39
2.	"Stinkfist"	5:09
3.	"Prison Sex"	4:56
4.	"Sober"	5:05
5.	"Hush" (DVD version only; not included on the VHS version)	2:48
Total length:		24:37

== Personnel ==
Tool

- Maynard James Keenan – vocals
- Adam Jones – guitars
- Justin Chancellor – bass, backing vocals (on "You Lied")
- Danny Carey – drums

Additional musicians

- Buzz Osborne – additional guitar (on "No Quarter")
- David Bottrill – keyboards (on "Message to Harry Manback II")
- Vince DeFranco (Synesthesia) – synthesizer (on "Third Eye")
- Aloke Dutta – acoustic tabla (on "Pushit")

Technical personnel

- Tool – production
- David Bottrill – mixing; production and engineering (on "Message to Harry Manback II")

== Charts ==
Chart (2000–2001)	Peak position
Australian Albums (ARIA)	29
US Billboard 200	38
