= Flying Saucer Tour Vol. 1 =

Live album by Bill Hicks
- Released: November 12, 2002
- Recorded: June 20, 1991, Pittsburgh, Pennsylvania
- Genre: Stand-up comedy
- Length: 75:18
- Label: Rykodisc

Bill Hicks chronology
Love, Laughter and Truth (2002)	Flying Saucer Tour Vol. 1 (2002)	Shock and Awe (2003)

Professional ratings
Review scores
Source	Rating
AllMusic	4.5/5 stars
Pitchfork Media	(7.9/10)
PopMatters	(favorable)

Flying Saucer Tour Vol. 1 is a live performance album by American stand-up comedian and satirist Bill Hicks, released by Rykodisc in 2002. Unlike his other albums, where the crowds have generally been fairly receptive and accepting of his act, this album is notable for the negative (or lack of) reaction Hicks receives throughout most of the album.

Track 4 of the album contains an additional joke at the end of the track that does not appear on the video version of the same title.

== Track listing ==
1. "Intro" - 0:26
2. "Summertime" - 2:49
3. "The F Word" - 0:42
4. "Smoking" - 2:01
5. "Yul Brynner" - 1:25
6. "Trying to Quit" - 4:56
7. "The News" - 1:00
8. "The War" - 3:45
9. "Worst Audience Ever" - 1:03
10. "More War" - 2:14
11. "Are You Guys Drug Dealers?" - 1:50
12. "Praying for Nuclear Holocaust" - 1:10
13. "Girl of Your Dreams" - 2:16
14. "Young Lady" - 1:26
15. "Vs. the Audience 1" - 0:51
16. "What's Wrong?" - 1:53
17. "Vs. the Audience 2" - 4:40
18. "School Days" - 3:18
19. "Vs. the Audience 3" - 1:16
20. "Working" - 1:15
21. "Great Times on Drugs" - 7:11
22. "Mandatory Marijuana" - 4:49
23. "Penthouse Letters" - 2:48
24. "Talking Car" - 3:38
25. "Summer Trip" - 2:20
26. "Drugs Have Done Good Things" - 3:10
27. "Menu?" - 1:28
28. "Beelzebozo" - 1:36
29. "Cause of Sexual Thought" - 4:08
30. "Mechanics of Pornography" - 3:09
31. "Goodnight" - 0:44
