= H. (song) =

Promotional single by Tool

from the album Ænima
- Released: 1997
- Genre: Alternative metal; progressive metal
- Length: 6:07
- Label: Zoo
- Songwriters: Maynard James Keenan; Adam Jones; Danny Carey; Paul D'Amour
- Producers: Tool; David Bottrill

Tool singles chronology
"Stinkfist" (1996)	"H." (1997)	"Ænema" (1997)

"H." is a song by American rock band Tool. It was released as a promotional single from their second studio album, Ænima (1996). "H." peaked at No. 23 on Billboard's Mainstream Rock chart. It is one of four songs on Ænima to have songwriting contributions by former bassist Paul D'Amour.

The working title for the song was "Half Empty", and thus "H." most likely stands for that or "Half Full". During several tours, the lead singer of Tool, Maynard James Keenan, has referred to his son, whose middle name is H, just before performances of this song.

However, on several occasions, specifically on November 23, 1996, during a show at the Electric Factory in Philadelphia, Maynard James Keenan granted some insight into another meaning of the song, saying:

So, any of you ever watched those Warner Bros. cartoons? Sometimes there's that one where that guy is having a tough time trying to make a decision. He's got an angel on one shoulder and the devil on the other. Seems pretty obvious, right? Usually it's the angel who is kind of the one trying to give him the good advice while the devil is trying to get him to do what's bad for him. It's not always that simple though. Most times they're not really angels or devils. They're just friends giving you advice, looking out for your best interest but not really understanding what's going to be best for you. So it kind of comes down to you. You have to make the decision yourself... This song is called H.

== Charts ==
Chart (1997)	Peak position
US Mainstream Rock Airplay (Billboard)	23

== Certifications ==
Certifications for H
Region	Certification	Certified units/sales
New Zealand (RMNZ)	Gold	15,000^{‡}
^{‡} Sales+streaming figures based on certification alone.
