= Arizona Bay =

Live album by Bill Hicks
- Released: February 25, 1997
- Recorded: November 22, 1992 – June 1993
- Venue: Laff Stop, Austin, TX
- Studio: Fossil Creek Studio, Austin, TX
- Genre: Comedy
- Length: 65:56
- Label: Rykodisc
- Producer: Kevin Booth

Bill Hicks chronology
Relentless (1992)	Arizona Bay (1997)	Rant in E-Minor (1997)

Professional ratings
Review scores
Source	Rating
AllMusic	5/5 stars

Arizona Bay is an album by American stand-up comedian and satirist Bill Hicks, posthumously released in 1997. Both this album and a similar album of new material, Rant in E-Minor, were released posthumously by Rykodisc on February 25, 1997, marking three years since Hicks' death.

The album's title refers to the hope that Los Angeles will one day fall into the ocean due to a major earthquake. Hicks contends that the world will be better off in L.A.'s absence:

Ahhh, ha ha ha, it's gone, it's gone, it's gone. Oh, it's gone. All the shitty shows are gone, all the idiots screaming in the fucking wind are dead, I love it. Leaving nothing but a cool, beautiful serenity called...Arizona Bay. That's right, when L.A. falls in the fucking ocean and is flushed away, all that it will leave...is Arizona Bay.

On April 28, 2015, Comedy Dynamics released a new version of the album in the digital format called Arizona Bay Extended, featuring "a raw and uncut show that comprised the original Arizona Bay album."

== Musical content ==
Several of Hicks's albums are unique in that they feature background music, meant to enhance the album's mood. Such additions were made well after the initial recordings and are the product of Hicks's own musicianship.

According to Kevin Booth, in the BBC documentary Dark Poet, it was during the early recording sessions for Arizona Bay, around Christmas 1992, that Hicks first started suffering from the pains in his side, which would later be diagnosed as pancreatic cancer. Upon learning that he had developed cancer, Hicks used his time to mix music into Rant in E-Minor and Arizona Bay, calling it his Dark Side of the Moon.

== Legacy ==
In 1996, one year prior to the release of Hicks' Arizona Bay album, American rock band Tool released the album Ænima, which contains several references to Hicks. The title song of the album echoes the theme of Los Angeles being submerged in the ocean and includes the lyrics, "Learn to swim, see you down in Arizona Bay." Additionally, there is artwork inside the album booklet showing a map of California before and after the earthquake, as well as a caricature of Hicks himself, cited as "another dead hero".

The song "Third Eye" also contains references to several Hicks routines:

Who's that talking at the start of "Third Eye"? - That would be the aforementioned Bill Hicks; those are snips of comedy routines of his, from "The War on Drugs" (off his CD Dangerous) and "Drugs Have Done Good Things" (off Relentless). In fact, on his CD Rant in E-Minor, he refers to the power that heavy doses of hallucinogens have to "squeegee his third eye."

== Track listing ==
All music composed by Bill Hicks

No.	Title	Length
1.	"Goodbye You Lizard Scum"	3:52
2.	"Step on the Gas (L.A. Riots)"	4:50
3.	"Hooligans"	4:20
4.	"Officer Nigger Hater"	5:27
5.	"As Long as We're Talking Shelf Life (Kennedy)"	5:00
6.	"The Elephant Is Dead (Bush)"	1:57
7.	"Me & Saddam"	3:10
8.	"Bullies of the World"	1:22
9.	"Shane's Song"	2:03
10.	"Dinosaurs in the Bible"	5:45
11.	"Living God"	1:05
12.	"Marketing & Advertising"	4:38
13.	"Don't Talk for Me"	1:40
14.	"Clam Lappers & Sonic the Hedgehog"	3:02
15.	"She's Got a Broken Heart"	1:09
16.	"Pussywhipped Satan"	4:40
17.	"L.A. Falls"	3:54
18.	"Elvis"	8:05

=== Arizona Bay Extended ===
No.	Title	Length
1.	"Intro"	2:03
2.	"Arizona Bay"	0:50
3.	"Goodbye You Lizard Scum"	2:15
4.	"Ha-Ha Los Angeles"	1:11
5.	"Step on the Gas (L.A. Riots)"	3:44
6.	"Hooligans"	1:27
7.	"Officer Nigger Hater"	5:46
8.	"As Long as We're Talking Shelf Life (Kennedy)"	4:16
9.	"The Elephant Is Dead (Bush)"	3:03
10.	"Deficit - Tighten the Belt"	1:19
11.	"Me & Saddam"	0:50
12.	"Dinosaurs in the Bible"	6:00
13.	"Fetus on TV"	1:21
14.	"Abortion"	0:52
15.	"Bring Granny to the Show"	0:31
16.	"I Quit Smoking"	1:09
17.	"Old Smoker in Central Park"	0:36
18.	"Smoking in L.A. (No Tolerance)"	1:19
19.	"No Smoking on Airplanes (But They Allow Children)"	3:58
20.	"We're Recording an Album Tonight"	0:20
21.	"Going for the Record (Nothing but Air)"	1:02
22.	"Marketing & Advertising"	1:56
23.	"Basic Instinct"	6:52
24.	"Goatboy"	3:08
25.	"Clam Lappers & Sonic the Hedgehog"	1:54
26.	"Goatboy Revisited"	0:55
27.	"I Blame the Women"	2:00
28.	"Pussywhipped Satan"	2:41
29.	"Microphone Is Getting Lower"	0:43
30.	"Charlie Hodge"	8:39

== Personnel ==
- Bill Hicks - guitar, vocals
- Kevin Booth - bass, keyboards, percussion, producer
