= Kualoa Ranch =

Large private, nature reserve and cattle ranch in Hawaii

Coordinates: 21.5207°N 157.8373°W

- Kualoa Ahupua'a Historical District
- U.S. National Register of Historic Places
- U.S. Historic district
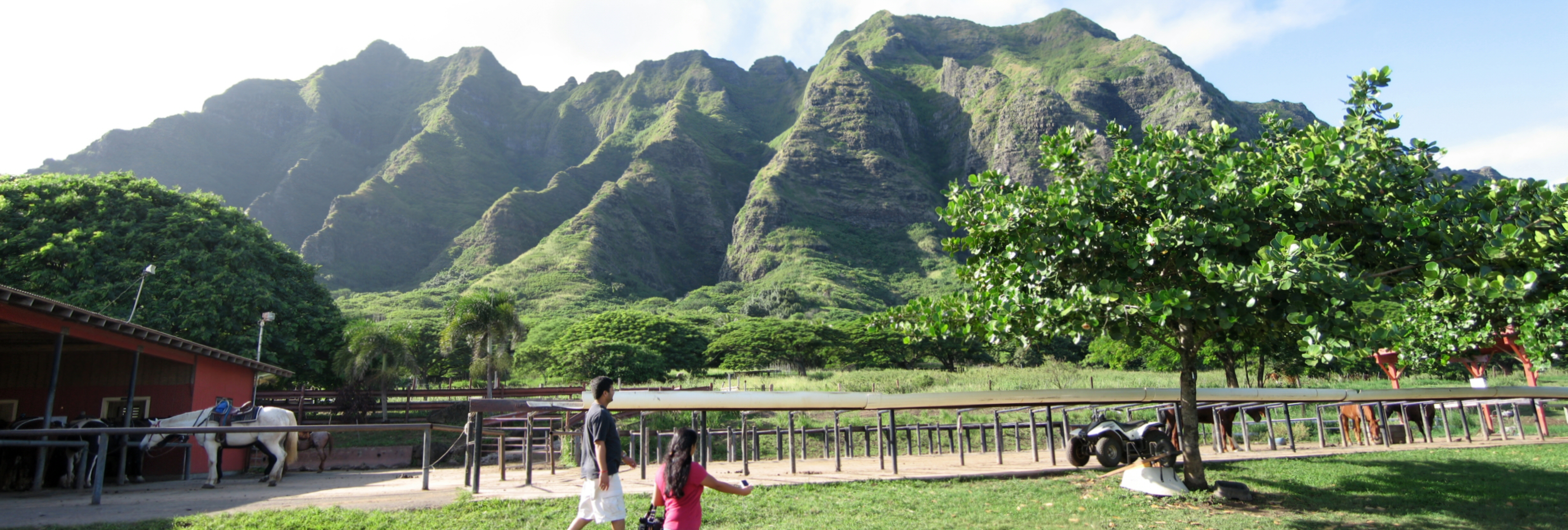
- Near the visitor center at Kualoa Ranch
- Nearest city: Kaneohe, Hawaii
- Area: 4,000 acres (1,600 ha)
- NRHP reference No.: 74000718
- Added to NRHP: October 16, 1974

Established in 1850, Kualoa is a 4,000-acre (1,600 ha) private nature reserve and working cattle ranch, as well as a popular visitor attraction and filming location on the windward coast of Oʻahu in Hawaii. It is about 24 miles (39 km) from Waikiki, and 32 miles (51 km) from Haleiwa. The ranch consists of 3 valleys: Kaʻaʻawa Valley, Kualoa Valley, and Hakipuʻu Valley. The ranch is located on Hawaii State Route 83 between Kaʻaʻawa and Waikane. The main street address is 49-560 Kamehameha Highway, Kāneʻohe, Hawaiʻi 96744.

== History ==
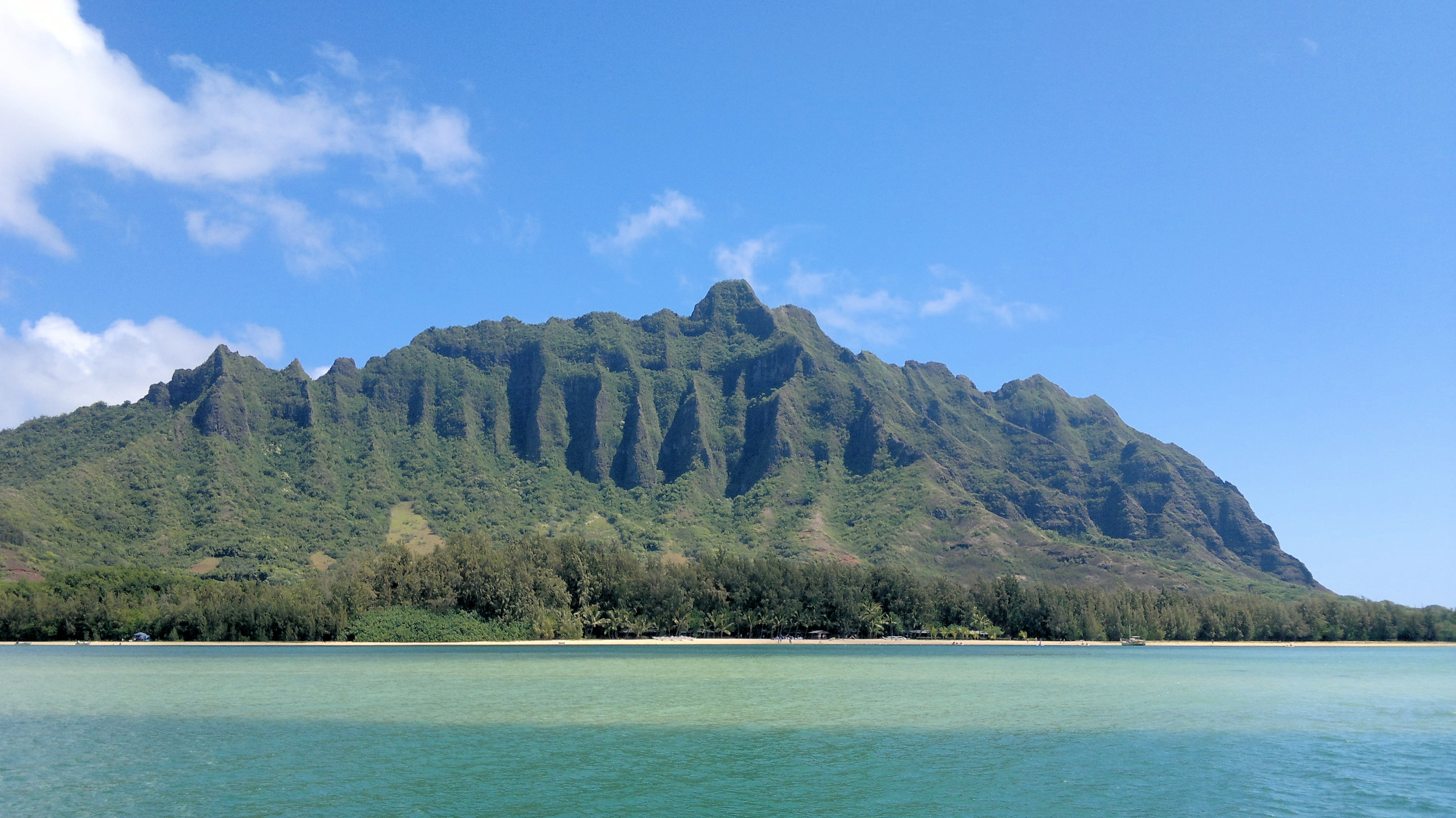
The Kualoa Ranch is at the foot of the Kualoa Mountain Range

The valley was sacred to ancient Hawaiians from the 13th to the 18th century, as Chief Laʻa-mai-kahiki settled there after visiting Kauaʻi before returning to Tahiti. It was also the site of the sacred drums of Kapahuʻula and Kaʻahuʻulapunawai as well as the sacred Hill of Kauakahiakahoʻowaha, the key to the sovereignty of the Kingdom of Oʻahu. As written in the Kumulipo, an ancient Hawaiian genealogical chant, Kualoa is where Papa and Wakea buried their first stillborn child, Haloa. It is said that the first kalo (taro) plant grew up from where Haloa was buried at Kualoa.

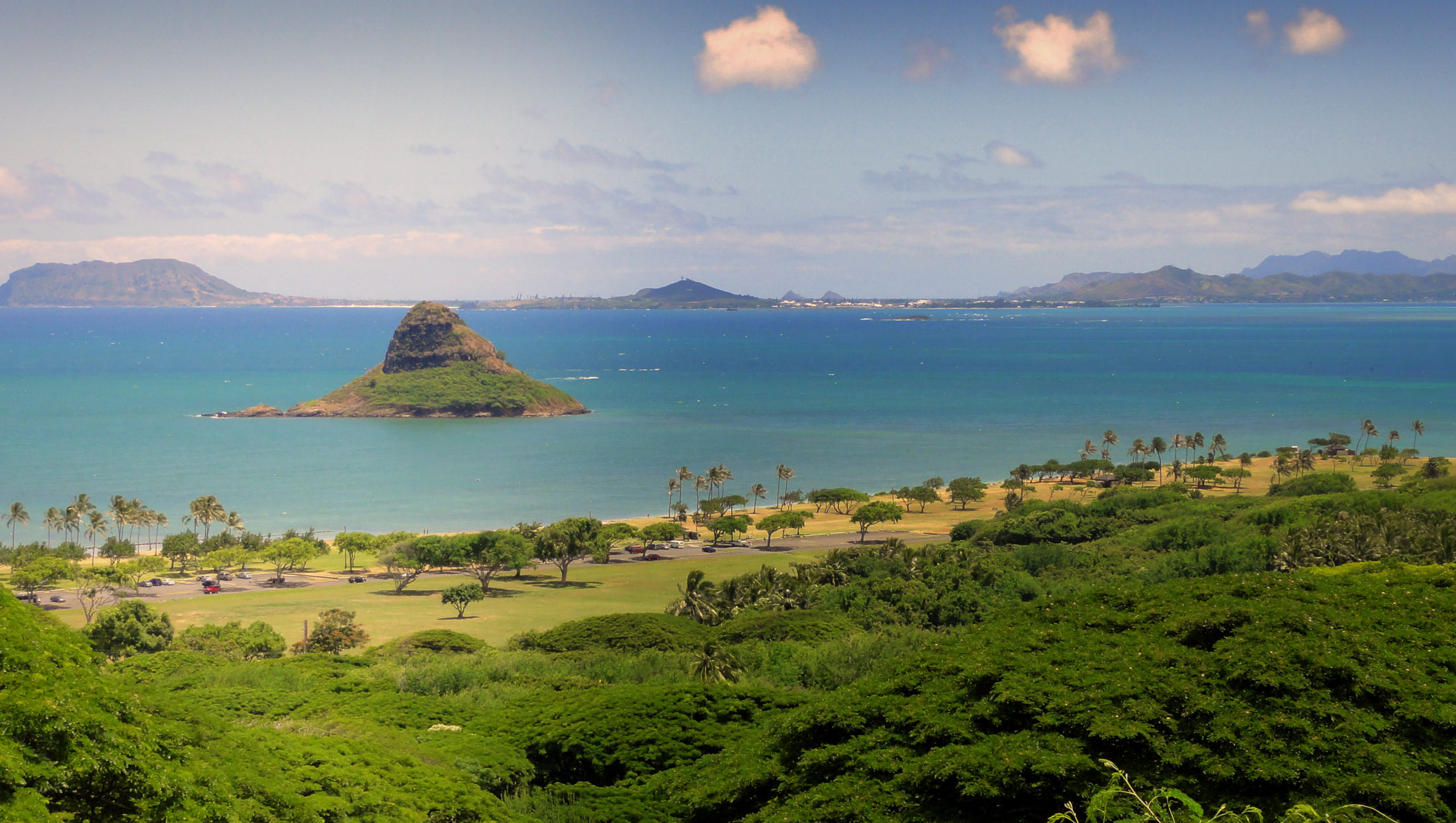
Mokoliʻi island, as seen from the Ranch.

In 1850 an American doctor and missionary Dr. Gerrit P. Judd purchased 622 acres of ranch land at Kualoa for $1300, and also the island of Mokoliʻi just offshore, from King Kamehameha III. Dr. Judd was the first person to translate medical journals into the Hawaiian language for King Kamehameha and so the king was very grateful for his works. In 1860 Dr. Judd bought a further 2200 acres. Then in 1880 Dr. Judd's son Charles bought another 1188 acres. Today there are about 4000 acres of land.

In 1863 Charles Judd and his brother-in-law Samuel Gardner Wilder started a sugarcane plantation and built a sugar mill at the ranch. Several years of low rainfall brought sugar farming to a close, and the mill closed in 1870. The ruins of the old sugar mill can still be seen along Kamehameha Highway.

In 1941 during World War II, the U.S. military occupied the land, which became the site of Kualoa Airfield. After the war the ranch was returned to the Morgan family, the owners who were descendants of Dr. Judd.

The entire ahupuaʻa (traditional land division of ancient Hawaii) was added to the National Register of Historic Places listings in Oahu as the Kualoa Ahupuaʻa Historical District, site 74000718 on October 16, 1974.

From 1993 to 1998, the ranch hosted Hawaii's first major rock festival, the Big Mele, since the Diamond Head Crater Festivals held on New Years Day from 1969 to 1978.

== Activities ==
The property continues to be a working cattle ranch and is run by John Morgan from the island of Hawaii. Kualoa is open for guided tours and tours on horseback.

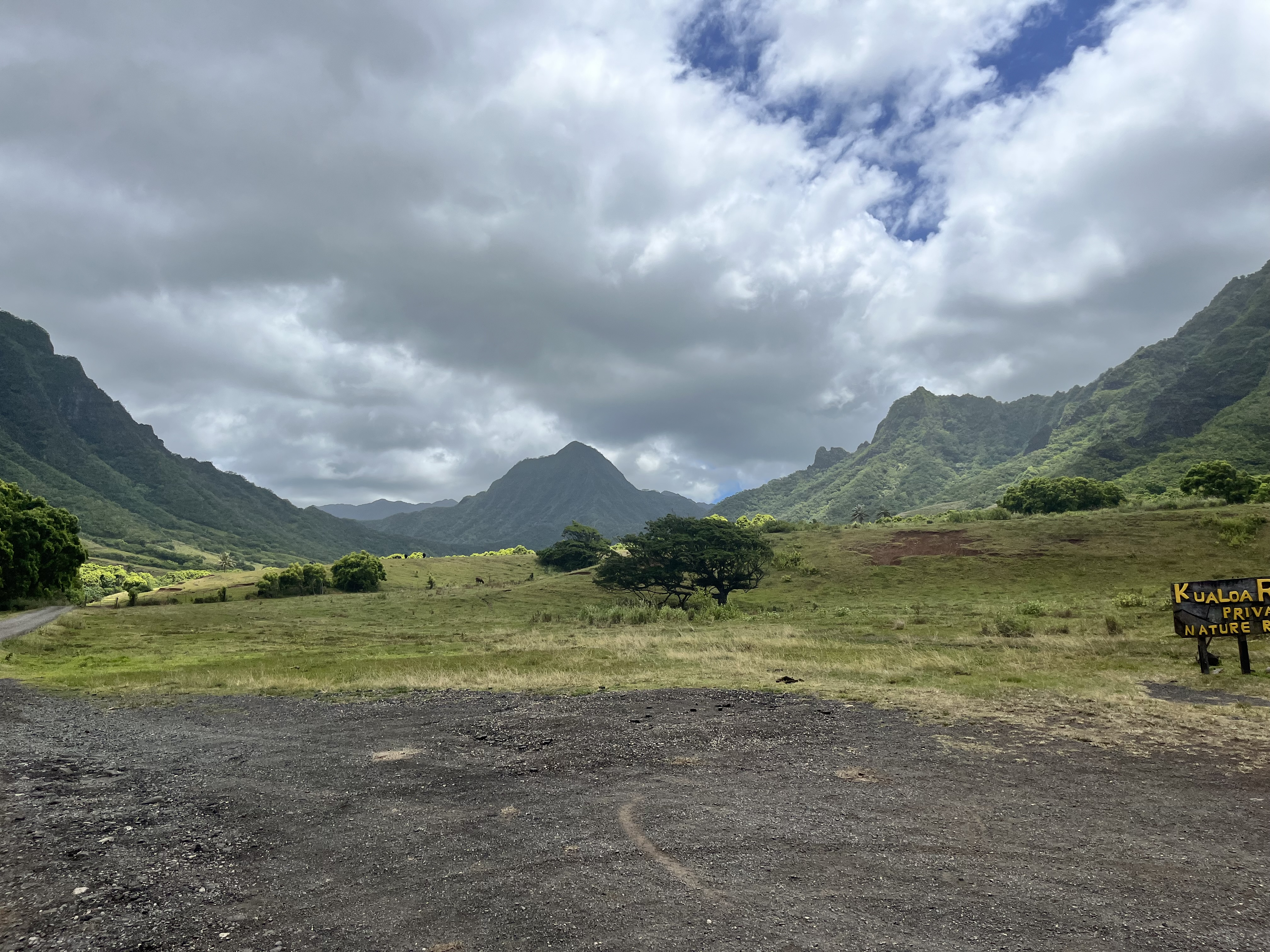
Photo taken of Kualoa Ranch in Hawaii.

In 2018, the ranch was raising shrimp and making it available, as local lunch cuisine, to visitors.

== In popular culture ==
More than 200 movies and TV shows have been filmed at Kualoa over the years, including George of the Jungle, Paradise, Hawaiian Style, Jurassic Park, Jurassic World, Mighty Joe Young, 50 First Dates, You, Me and Dupree, Hawaii Five-0, Magnum P.I., Pearl Harbor, Windtalkers, Fantasy Island, Godzilla, Kong: Skull Island, Jumanji, Jumanji: Welcome to the Jungle, Snatched, and Lost.

The Secret Island, located within the ranch, served as the Finish Line for The Amazing Race 20, which aired on May 6, 2012. A few months later, Secret Island appeared as the site of a Pit Stop on the French version of The Amazing Race.

== See also ==
- Hawaiʻi Film Office
- Francis S. Morgan
