= Hooker with a Penis =

Song by Tool

from the album Ænima
- Released: September 17, 1996
- Length: 4:33
- Label: Zoo; Volcano
- Songwriters: Maynard James Keenan; Adam Jones; Danny Carey; Justin Chancellor
- Producers: Tool; David Bottrill

"Hooker with a Penis" is a song by American rock band Tool. It was released on September 17, 1996, as the seventh track of their second studio album, Ænima (1996). The song is the shortest non-interlude track on the album. It has been seen as one of the heaviest songs of the band's career.

During Lollapalooza 1997, a version of "Hooker with a Penis" remixed by Billy Howerdel in the form of lounge music was played over the public address system between sets. The band played at the festival in 1997.

== Lyrics ==
The song begins with a story about a fan who accuses Tool of selling out. When asked if he is "sucking up to The Man", Keenan casually responds that everyone is "The Man". One such lyric points out that "all you read and wear or see and hear on TV is a product begging for your fatass dirty dollar".

== Reception ==
In a 2021 article, Revolver staff described "Hooker With a Penis" as "one of the heaviest, most pissed-off songs of Tool's career".
