= Forty Six & 2 =

Promotional single by Tool

from the album Ænima
- Released: 1997
- Genre: Alternative metal
- Length: 6:03
- Label: Freeworld
- Songwriters: Maynard James Keenan; Adam Jones; Danny Carey; Justin Chancellor
- Producers: Tool; David Bottrill

Tool singles chronology
| "Ænema" (1997) | "Forty Six & 2" (1997) | "Eulogy" (1998) |

Audio sample
- Sample of "Forty Six & 2".: file; help

"Forty Six & 2" is a song by American rock band Tool. It was released as a promotional single from their second studio album, Ænima (1996).

== Title and theme ==
A popular belief is that the song title refers to an idea first conceived by Drunvalo Melchizedek concerning the possibility of reaching a state of evolution at which the body would have two more than the normal 46 total chromosomes and leave a disharmonious state. The premise is humans would deviate from the current state of human DNA which contains 44 autosomes and two sex chromosomes. The next step of evolution would likely result in human DNA being reorganized into 46 autosomes and two sex chromosomes, according to Melchizedek.

Additionally, it may refer to the desire to experience change through the "shadow", an idea that represents the parts of one's psyche and identity that one hates, fears and represses; this exists as a recurring theme in the work of Carl Jung.

== Composition ==
Considered an "alt-metal anthem", the song is mostly in 4/4 time with some sections of 7/8 in between. In the intro, Danny Carey plays four measures of 7/8 on his ride cymbal over the rest of the band playing in 4/4, and they all meet up on the downbeat of the 5th measure in 4/4. During the bridge there are three measures of 7/8 followed by one measure of 4/4. During a particular quad fill, the drums are in 3/8, the guitar plays one measure of 9/8 followed by one in 5/8 all while the bass keeps time in 7/8. Most of the song is written in D Phrygian dominant scale, also known as the fifth mode of the G harmonic minor scale.

== Legacy ==
In March 2023, Rolling Stone ranked "Forty Six & 2" at No. 53 on their "100 Greatest Heavy Metal Songs of All Time" list.

== Charts ==
| Chart (1998) | Peak position |
|---|---|
| Australia (ARIA) | 152 |
| US Mainstream Rock (Billboard) | 22 |
