= Kevin Booth =

American film producer (born 1961)

- Born: October 2, 1961 (age 64); Connecticut, U.S.
- Education: University of Texas
- Occupations: Producer, film director, writer and musician
- Known for: Documentaries, collaboration with Bill Hicks and Alex Jones
- Spouse: Trae Painter Booth

Kevin Booth (born October 2, 1961) is an American film director, producer, lecturer and musician. He was known for his documentary film series American Drug War. Booth worked with comedian Bill Hicks, until the time of his death on February 26, 1994 and posthumously produced Hicks' records Rant in E Minor and Arizona Bay.

Booth also explored controversial subjects such as the Waco siege and the New World Order. Booth lectures at universities while continuing to make more films about American drug policy.

== Early life ==
Booth was born in Connecticut on October 2, 1961. He was the son of George Booth. His brother Curt played in several rock bands and influenced his musical interests. Booth met Bill Hicks and Dwight Slade at Stratford High School in Houston, Texas. The trio formed Stress, an early rock band. Booth played the bass and Hicks the lead guitar and lead vocals. He attended the University of Texas in Austin.

== Career ==
=== Music ===
Booth started the rock band Year Zero, with Brent Ballard, Robert Reilly, Patrick Allen Brown and Ron Fair. Year Zero signed a major contract with Chrysalis Records, and in 1987 released an album including the single Hourglass. When Year Zero broke up, Booth continued working with drummer Pat Brown and formed Marble Head Johnson. Booth wrote and performed with Hicks on Arizona Bay and Marble Head Johnson.

=== Film and video production ===
In 1982, while living in Austin, Booth started Absolute Creative Entertainment production company with Hicks, which became Sacred Cow Productions.

In 1989, Booth was a producer at the local public access station in Austin called ACTV. While there, he taped Bill Hick's stand-up comedy routine at the Laff Stop, called Sane Man. Booth produced most of Hick's videos, full-length comedy concerts, and CDs, including Relentless. After Hicks' death from pancreatic cancer in 1994, Booth produced Rant in E Minor. It was voted by SPIN magazine as the 11th greatest comedy album of all time. In May 2005, Booth traveled to Britain to promote his first book Bill Hicks – Agent of Evolution about his professional life and seventeen-year friendship with Bill Hicks; It was co-written by Michael Bertin. He also appeared in the 2009 documentary about his friend's life entitled American: The Bill Hicks Story.

In 2012, Booth collaborated with several companies providing him the financial means to produce this documentary about the medicinal benefits of marijuana. He also completed works about political issues, such as the Waco siege and the New World Order conspiracy theory.

==== Martial Law 9/11 ====
Martial Law 9/11: Rise of The Police State (2005) was co-produced by Booth with Alex Jones, who directed the documentary. It explores the changes in the United States since the September 11 attacks.

==== American Drug War: The Last White Hope ====
Booth directed American Drug War: The Last White Hope (2007) to examine governmental policies concerning drugs since Richard Nixon declared a "war on drugs" in 1971. It examines the government's prosecution of users, incarceration of non-violent drug offenders, focus on marijuana (a "gateway" drug), and alleges a lack of focus on large corporations that launder drug money. The documentary explores the involvement of the CIA and Contras cocaine trafficking in the US, including the experiences of one of the Central Intelligence Agency's (CIA) "chief beneficiaries", "Freeway" Rick Ross. Ross declared the war on drugs as the "last white hope". Appearing in the documentary are Tommy Chong, of Cheech and Chong; General Barry McCaffrey, a previous drug czar; and people involved in drug use, sales or convictions of drug users or traffickers. Booth provides insight about addiction within his family.

It was shown on Showtime from 2008 to 2010 and won several awards for best feature documentary at film festivals in the United States. For instance, in 2007, the film won Artivist Film Festival's Best Feature, International Human Rights Award. The documentary has also been shown in other countries, like South Africa, Canada and Australia.

==== American Drug War 2: Cannabis Destiny ====
American Drug War 2: Cannabis Destiny was released theatrically in 16 cities across the nation beginning on June 6, 2013. The second installment to American Drug War starts at the 2012 election that legalized recreational use in two states and the film follows the traumatic story of a young boy named Cash Hyde who is repeatedly denied cannabis oil, the only medicine that appears to shrink his brain tumor. ADW2 also documents the saga of filmmaker Booth and his wife becoming foster parents and encountering the over prevalent use of pharmaceuticals on foster kids. These stories and much more underline the film's theme of children being the ultimate victims of American drug policy. The film talks about the United States Department of Health and Human Services 2003 patent on cannabinoids. It also explores the prohibition of "ancient drugs" on children through the story of an infant named Cash Hyde who was diagnosed with brain cancer. The film shares findings of Dr. Donald Abrams, Head of Oncology at San Francisco General Hospital, and a Canadian man named Rick Simpson who reportedly devised a new type of cannabis oil used to treat serious illnesses. In the film Booth and wife Trae become foster parents and explore the issue of foster children being over-medicated. Booth and two New York Times journalists filmed in Ciudad Juárez, Mexico, to show how young boys are being recruited by drug cartels. It is available through a "world-wide video-on-demand" system for theaters provided by Gravitas Ventures' start up, TUGG.com, and Warner Brothers.

==== Shadows of Sofia ====
Booth directed Shadows of Sofia (2019) to examine Russian manipulation on the small eastern European country of Bulgaria.

=== Lecture tours ===
Booth has shown clips of How Weed Won the West and later his documentary American Drug War: The Last White Hope and lectured at universities and other organizations about American drug policy and legalization of marijuana. For instance the Students for Sensible Drug Policy (SSDP) of Tufts University brought Booth onto the campus in December 2012 to screen the film and talk with university students. In February 2012, the University of New Hampshire's NORML / SSDP group held an event for Booth.

== Personal life ==
Booth is married to Trae Painter Booth, who was an associate producer, production accountant and make-up artist on American Drug War 2: Cannabis Destiny. She also appeared in the documentary.

== Works ==
=== Music ===
- Year Zero (1987). New York: Chrysalis Records. OCLC 50484723.

=== Filmography ===
Booth's film and video works include:

Year	Film	Type	Position(s)
2019	Shadows of Sofia	documentary	writer, director, producer, editor
2013	American Drug War 2: Cannabis Destiny	documentary	writer, director, producer, editor
2010	How Weed Won the West	documentary	director, producer
2007	American Drug War: The Last White Hope	documentary	director, executive producer, editor
2005	Martial Law 9/11: Rise of the Police State	documentary	co-producer, editor
2004	American Dictators	TV documentary	director, executive producer, producer
2002	Doug Stanhope: Word of Mouth	video	director, producer, editor
2001	Joe Rogan: Live from the Belly of the Beast	video	director, producer, editor
2000	The Best of Alex Jones	video documentary	editor
1996	Dwight Slade: Willy's Footsteps	video	director, editor
1993	On the Seventh Day in Waco	video documentary	director, editor
1993	Counts of the Netherworld	TV movie	director, producer
1993	Sacred Cow Halloween Special	video	editor
1993	Sea Man	video documentary short	director, editor
1991	Ninja Bachelor Party	short	director, producer
1989	Bill Hicks: Sane Man	video documentary	director, executive producer, producer, editor

Booth has also been an actor, camera operator, cinematographer and has appeared as himself in documentaries, videos and on television.

== See also ==
- Bill Hicks

=== Publications ===
- Kevin Booth; Michael Bertin (June 24, 2010). Bill Hicks: Agent of Evolution. HarperCollins Publishers. ISBN 978-0-00-737503-5.
