= Relentless (Bill Hicks album) =

Live album by Bill Hicks
- Released: 1992
- Recorded: December 14–17, 1991
- Venue: The Laff Stop, Austin
- Genre: Comedy
- Length: 57:41
- Label: Invasion
- Producer: Kevin Booth

Bill Hicks chronology
Dangerous (1990)	Relentless (1992)	Arizona Bay (1997)

Alternative cover
- DVD version

Professional ratings
Review scores
Source	Rating
AllMusic	4.5/5 stars

Relentless is the second live album by American stand-up comedian and satirist Bill Hicks, released in 1992 by Invasion Records. It was Hicks' final release before his death from pancreatic cancer in February 1994. The album contains a song, "Chicks Dig Jerks", written and performed by Marblehead Johnson, a band Hicks had formed with friends.

In 1997, Rykodisc issued remastered versions of both Relentless and its predecessor, Dangerous (1990), on CD, as well as the posthumous albums Arizona Bay and Rant in E-Minor.

== Track listing ==
All material written by Bill Hicks, except "Chicks Dig Jerks", by Marblehead Johnson.

No.	Title	Length
1.	"Greetings"	1:20
2.	"Sex on Trial"	3:07
3.	"The News"	1:19
4.	"The War"	12:10
5.	"Odd Beliefs"	0:49
6.	"A Killer Idea"	3:02
7.	"Smoking"	7:10
8.	"Great Times on Drugs"	11:23
9.	"Drugs Have Done Good Things"	1:19
10.	"Rockers Against Drugs Suck"	2:11
11.	"Beelzebozo"	1:08
12.	"Summer Trip"	1:26
13.	"What Is Pornography?"	3:37
14.	"The Sanctity of Life"	2:51
15.	"Chicks Dig Jerks"	4:46

== Personnel ==
- Bill Hicks – performer
- Marblehead Johnson – performer ("Chicks Dig Jerks")

Technical

- Kevin Booth – producer, engineer
- Fred Remmert – editing, mixing
- Greg Mellang – cover photo
- John Dobratz – cover photo
- Bill Hicks – cover idea
- Josh Weinstein – cover idea
- Caveman Wellington – set-up
- Tony the Landlord – breakdown
- Eddie Garcia – mastering
- Sloan (Millman Productions) – design
- Alley Rutzel – art direction
- Steven Saporta – executive producer
- Peter Casperson – executive producer

== DVD version ==
The film version, Relentless: Montreal International Comedy Festival 1991, was recorded at the Centaur Theatre during the annual Just for Laughs Comedy Festival in Montreal, Quebec, Canada. Despite the common title, the CD album was recorded at a separate performance, after the Just for Laughs festival had closed.

The film version was released on DVD in the US in 2004 as part of the compilation Bill Hicks Live: Satirist, Social Critic, Stand Up Comedian, then as a stand-alone Region 2 release in 2006, and as part of the 2015 Bill Hicks: The Complete Collection Box Set.

=== Track listing ===
1. "Intro/I Love My Job"
2. "I Don't Fit In/War"
3. "Fyffe, Alabama"
4. "Smoking"
5. "Sexual Thought"
6. "Religion"
7. "Time for a Question"
8. "Drugs and Music"
9. "My Point"
