= Stinkfist =

Single by Tool

from the album Ænima
- B-side: Sober; Prison Sex
- Released: 1996
- Genre: Alternative metal
- Length: 5:11
- Label: Zoo
- Songwriters: Maynard James Keenan; Adam Jones; Danny Carey; Paul D'Amour
- Producers: Tool; David Bottrill

Tool singles chronology
"Sober" (1994)	"Stinkfist" (1996)	"H." (1997)

"Stinkfist", also referred to as "Track #1" due to the perceived offensiveness of the actual title, is a song by American rock band Tool. It was released as the only commercial single from their second studio album, Ænima (1996). It is one of four songs on Ænima to have songwriting contributions by former bassist Paul D'Amour.

== Interpretation ==
Stinkfist played live in Krakow, Poland, 2024

The song title, the lyrics, and the perceived subject matter (fisting and drug addiction) caused changes to be made to the originally released version by TV and radio programmers, who also shortened the track. The track has also been remixed by Skinny Puppy.

Maynard James Keenan said the use of the words "stink" and "fist" and the resulting perception of "fist fucking" is actually symbolic in dealing with a friend of drummer Danny Carey who "isn't afraid of getting his hands dirty" rather than a "write-off" of the sexual term. Instead, fisting is a metaphor for the real cause of ailment.

== Music video ==
The music video for "Stinkfist" was created with stop-motion animation techniques featuring live actors, and was directed by the band's guitarist Adam Jones (who had previous experience in art direction and animation). The video begins with a shot of an empty jar, electrical arcing and a television screen covered in dust with the album cover "Smoke Box" appearing on it. It focuses on two members, one male and one female, of a race of sand people. They suck on tubes and swallow nails and wires that apparently hurt them and are ejected from their bodies, after which they are put into the jars and treasured. Another race of mutants has entrails that are plugged into a wall. At one point in the video one of the main characters is seen peeling off the sand skin revealing another layer of skin with tattoo-like designs covering the entire body. Towards the end of the video, the main male character is seen from the back which reveals a tumor-like life form growing from his left shoulder. At least one reviewer compared the visuals to H. R. Giger's Biomechanical art.

The video achieved heavy rotation on MTV, although it was shown only with the title "Track #1" instead of "Stinkfist". MTV reasoned that "Stinkfist" was too offensive for public consumption. Matt Pinfield, the host of 120 Minutes, responded on air to the lot of email complaints received from fans by saying there was nothing he could do about it. While he said "if you don't know the name of the song, go out and buy the album," he was waving his fist in front of his face. When introducing the video, video jockey Kennedy would also sniff her clenched fist dramatically before saying "Track #1". The video was ranked at number six in a feature on Scuzz of viewer's top 50 music videos of all time, and number one in its list of the "Top 10 Most F*cked Up Videos".

== Track listing ==
=== UK single ===
No.	Title	Length
1.	"Stinkfist"	5:11
2.	"Hooker with a Penis"	4:33

=== 10" single ===
Side A
No.	Title	Length
1.	"Stinkfist"	5:11
2.	"Opiate"	5:20

Side B
No.	Title	Length
1.	"Sober"	5:06
2.	"Prison Sex"	4:56

== Charts ==
Chart (1996)	Peak position
Australia (ARIA)	126
Canada Rock/Alternative (RPM)	1
US Alternative Airplay (Billboard)	19
US Mainstream Rock Airplay (Billboard)	17
