= Big Mele =

Annual rock festival on Oahu, Hawaii

The Big Mele
- Genre: Rock, punk rock, pop, alternative rock, hip hop, ska
- Locations: Kualoa Ranch, Oahu, Hawaii
- Years active: 1993-1999

The Big Mele was an annual rock festival on Oahu, Hawaii, from 1993 to 1999. For its first six years, the concert was held at Kualoa Ranch on the island's Windward Side. The final concert was held at Turtle Bay Resort, then known as the Turtle Bay Hilton.

== History ==
In 1993, Radio Free Hawaii founder Norm Winter teamed up with the then-independent concert promotion company Goldenvoice to bring a rock music festival to the state of Hawaii. The inaugural lineup included Fishbone, Primus, Stone Temple Pilots, Tool, and Violent Femmes.

The 1998 Big Mele opening act was local rock band Sunburn, the first time a Hawaii-based band played the festival. Sunburn had previously opened for Soundgarden and Van Halen at the Blaisdell Center.

== Lineups ==
1993: Tool, Fishbone, Stone Temple Pilots, Violent Femmes, Primus

1994: Porno for Pyros, Blind Melon, Social Distortion, Chokebore, NOFX

1995: Rancid, Down By Law, Guttermouth, Face to Face, Pennywise

1996: No Doubt, The Presidents of the United States of America, Cypress Hill, The Mighty Mighty Bosstones, Dance Hall Crashers, Dishwalla, CIV

1997: Wu-Tang Clan, Incubus, NOFX, Save Ferris, 311

1998: Matchbox 20, Blink-182, Home Grown, Big Bad Voodoo Daddy, Candlebox, Long Beach Dub Allstars, Sunburn

1999: The Offspring, NOFX, Bad Religion, The Vandals, AFI, Fun Lovin' Criminals
