= Ninja Bachelor Party =

- Directed by: Kevin Booth
- Written by: Bill Hicks
- Starring: Bill Hicks; Kevin Booth; David Johndrow; Lynne Rardon
- Distributed by: Sacred Cow Productions
- Release date: January 1, 1991
- Running time: 30 minutes
- Country: United States
- Language: English

Ninja Bachelor Party is a 1991 low-budget comedy film produced by and starring Bill Hicks, Kevin Booth, and David Johndrow. It is a parody of martial arts movies and was intentionally dubbed improperly. It was filmed throughout Austin, Texas, and Houston, Texas, over the course of ten years due to the producers not taking the project seriously.

== Plot ==
Clarence Mumford is a Robitussin addict living with his parents. He is on a quest to become a ninja master much to the dismay of his parents. He leaves the house to visit his girlfriend Shotsi, only for her to cheat on him with a few other men, who beat him up. After leaving Shotsi's apartment, he notices a flier advertising Dr. Death's dojo. Upon entering the dojo, he meets Dr. Death. After a brief discussion, Dr. Death offers to shake Clarence's hand, only to twist his arm and tell him to trust nobody, not even his own guru.

That night, Clarence experiences a dream in which an old martial arts master from Korea tells him to fly to Korea and train. The next morning, Clarence departs for the airport, flies to Korea, and meets the old master that he saw in his dream the previous night. The master trains Clarence with sparring and meditation.

After finishing the training, Clarence returns to Shotsi's apartment in America to challenge Dr. Death to a fight that takes the two throughout the city and back to the apartment. Upon returning, Dr. Death holds Shotsi at knife-point. After channeling the master for help, Clarence receives a bike, which he uses to ride into Dr. Death, splitting him in half and killing him. After he wins, Shotsi leaps into Clarence's arms and the master appears right before him, revealing that he and Dr. Death were the same person all along, and telling him that he has to do one more thing before becoming a ninja warrior. The master tells Clarence that he did the right thing after he dumps Shotsi.

== Release ==
Ninja Bachelor Party was out of print following its 1991 VHS release until it was included in Bill Hicks: The Essential Collection.

A sequel, Ninja Bachelor Party III, was planned but only a humorous trailer was filmed.

== Reception ==
Reviewing the short as a part of the Essential Collection, PopMatters critic Sean Murphy called it "a huge draw" for Hicks' fans but a "semi-amusing lark" for others.
