= Ænema =

Promotional single by Tool

from the album Ænima
- Released: 1997
- Genre: Alternative metal; progressive metal
- Length: 6:39
- Label: Volcano
- Songwriters: Maynard James Keenan; Adam Jones; Danny Carey; Justin Chancellor
- Producers: Tool; David Bottrill

Tool singles chronology
"H." (1997)	"Ænema" (1997)	"Forty Six & 2" (1997)

Audio sample
- Excerpt of "Ænema": file; help

"Ænema" is a song by American rock band Tool. It was released as a promotional single from their second studio album, Ænima (1996). Adam Jones made a video for the song using stop-motion animation; it is included in the Salival box set. The song peaked at No. 25 on Billboard's Mainstream Rock chart in August 1997.

== Musical style ==
The song makes extensive use of hemiola, a musical technique in which the emphasis in a triple meter is changed to give the illusion that both a duple and a triple meter occur in the song.

The song is cast in terminally climactic form, in which two verse/chorus pairs give way to a climactic ending on new material.

== Music video ==
Adam Jones directed the video for "Ænema" which features stop-motion animation with art design by Cam de Leon. The video revolves around a humanoid figure with alien-like features. Throughout the video the character ventures through an aquatic room. A hose-like organ (resembling an umbilical cord) which squirts out water protrudes from its abdomen and fills the room in which the figure stands. At one point the figure starts to dress itself as images of embryos are briefly shown. Towards the end of the video a human character wearing a business suit tosses a water-filled box containing the figure.

== Track listing ==
No.	Title	Length
1.	"Ænema" (P.M. version)	6:39
2.	"Ænema" (A.M. version)	6:39

== Awards ==
Tool received the Grammy Award for Best Metal Performance for "Ænema", at the 40th Grammy Awards in 1998.

== Charts ==
Chart (1997)	Peak position
US Mainstream Rock (Billboard)	25

Chart (2019)	Peak position
Canadian Digital Song Sales (Billboard)	46
