= Rant in E-Minor =

Live album by Bill Hicks
- Released: February 25, 1997
- Recorded: November 1992 – December 1993
- Genre: Comedy
- Length: 73:54
- Labels: Rykodisc; RCD 10353
- Producer: Kevin Booth

Bill Hicks chronology
| Arizona Bay (1997) | Rant in E-Minor (1997) | Philosophy: The Best of Bill Hicks (2001) |

Professional ratings
Review scores
| Source | Rating |
|---|---|
| AllMusic | 5/5 stars |
| Static and Feedback | (favorable) |
| Tiny Mix Tapes | 5/5 |

Rant in E-Minor is an album by stand-up comedian and satirist Bill Hicks. Both this album and a similar album of new material, Arizona Bay, were released posthumously by Rykodisc on February 25, 1997, marking three years since Hicks' death.

The material on this album is darker and angrier in tone than some of his earlier work; Hicks can be heard screaming at his audience in between chapters, and very prominently during the track "You're Wrong Night".

On April 15, 2016, Comedy Dynamics released a new version of the album in both double CD and double vinyl LP formats called Rant in E-Minor: Variations. While the original album was culled from various performances and included musical interludes performed by Hicks, the new version presents a complete and uninterrupted performance recorded at the Laff Stop in Austin, Texas on October 24, 1993.

== Track listing ==
- Part One
  - Chapter One
    - 1. "Fevered Egos" – 4:05
    - 2. "Easter" – 1:19
    - 3. "Gideons" – 1:05
  - Chapter Two
    - 4. "People Suck" – 0:21
    - 5. "Pro Life" – 4:13
    - 6. "People Who Hate People" – 0:32
    - 7. "Non-Smokers" – 2:39
    - 8. "Gifts of Forgiveness" – 5:09
    - 9. "Purple Vein Dick Joke" – 0:29
  - Chapter Three
    - 10. "Confession Time (COPS)" – 4:25
    - 11. "Wax Dart" – 0:30
    - 12. "I'm Talking to the Women Here" – 1:10
- Part Two
  - Chapter Four
    - 13. "You're Wrong Night" – 5:37
  - Chapter Five
    - 14. "A New Flag (Patriotism)" – 1:13
    - 15. "Gays in the Military" – 2:24
    - 16. "I.R.S. Bust" – 1:09
    - 17. "Politics in America" – 0:39
    - 18. "Quiet Loner" – 0:57
  - Chapter Six
    - 19. "Artistic Roll Call" – 4:33
    - 20. "Orange Drink" – 1:08
    - 21. "Save Willie" – 1:30
  - Chapter Seven
    - 22. "Deficit (Jesse Helms)" – 2:47
    - 23. "Rush Limbaugh" – 2:21
- Part Three
  - Chapter Eight
    - 24. "Time to Evolve" – 3:16
  - Chapter Nine
    - 25. "Waco (Koresh)" – 5:35
    - 26. "The Pope" – 1:02
    - 27. "Christianity" – 0:27
    - 28. "Seven Seals" – 0:28
  - Chapter Ten
    - 29. "One of the Boys (Clinton)" – 1:03
    - 30. "Car Bomb Derby" – 0:26
    - 31. "The Elite" – 1:06
  - Chapter Eleven
    - 32. "Love List (No Future)" – 2:56
    - 33. "Back to the Garden" – 1:20
    - 34. "Your Children Aren't Special" – 3:13
    - 35. "Wizards Have Landed" – 1:43
    - 36. "Lift Me Lord" – 0:53

=== Rant in E-Minor: Variations ===
| No. | Title | Length |
|---|---|---|
| 1. | "Bill Takes Stage" | 0:23 |
| 2. | "Fevered Egos" | 4:38 |
| 3. | "Dance Clubs" | 1:54 |
| 4. | "Homosexuality" | 2:40 |
| 5. | "People Suck" | 0:22 |
| 6. | "Pro-Lifers and Non-Smokers" | 4:59 |
| 7. | "Started Smoking Again" | 1:59 |
| 8. | "Hendrix Was an Alien" | 1:32 |
| 9. | "Let's Do Some Comedy" | 0:08 |
| 10. | "Keith Richards and the Ledge Beyond the Edge" | 1:32 |
| 11. | "Hendrix Language" | 0:15 |
| 12. | "Musicians Who Are Dead" | 0:14 |
| 13. | "LA City of Hell" | 1:27 |
| 14. | "I've Smoked a Lot" | 0:30 |
| 15. | "Australia" | 2:24 |
| 16. | "Easter" | 1:23 |
| 17. | "Gideons" | 1:20 |
| 18. | "Gifts of Forgiveness" | 5:08 |
| 19. | "Riff on Comedy, Dick Jokes, And Plastic Plants" | 0:58 |
| 20. | "When Jesus Comes Back" | 1:11 |
| 21. | "Confession Time (Cops)" | 4:18 |
| 22. | "Wax Dart" | 1:01 |
| 23. | "I'm Talking to the Women Here" | 1:11 |
| 24. | "Pussywhipped Satan" | 1:41 |
| 25. | "Rebirthing" | 0:46 |
| 26. | "Rush Limbaugh" | 2:21 |
| 27. | "Glass of Water" | 0:24 |
| 28. | "Waco Koresh" | 4:18 |
| 29. | "One of the Boys (Clinton)" | 1:12 |
| 30. | "The Elite" | 1:17 |
| 31. | "Car Bombs and Cowards" | 0:56 |
| 32. | "Time to Evolve (More Dick Jokes Are Coming)" | 3:19 |
| 33. | "Deficit Jesse Helms" | 4:06 |
| 34. | "Alcohol Kills / Pot Is Better / A Job Has Been Created" | 2:58 |
| 35. | "A Better World (Are You Cool with That?)" | 0:45 |
| 36. | "Everything They Tell You About Pot Is a Lie (Play the Sitar)" | 1:08 |
| 37. | "Sacrifices" | 0:46 |
| 38. | "Carrot Top and Gallagher" | 2:53 |
| 39. | "Artistic Roll Call" | 4:07 |
| 40. | "Save Willie" | 1:04 |
| 41. | "Can't Breathe Out of My Right Lung" | 0:09 |
| 42. | "Bradley Tanks Knocking Down Catholic Churches" | 0:35 |
| 43. | "The Pope" | 1:10 |
| 44. | "Childbirth Is Not a Miracle" | 4:02 |
| 45. | "People Who Hate People" | 1:00 |
| 46. | "Philosophical Discussion with a Christian" | 1:54 |
| 47. | "Childbirth Is Not Natural (Back to the Garden)" | 0:46 |
| 48. | "It's Women (Women)" | 0:40 |
| 49. | "Guys Don't Want Children" | 0:38 |
| 50. | "Your Children Are Not Special (Grey Gym Sock)" | 3:11 |
| 51. | "Welcome to Comedy" | 1:02 |

== Personnel ==
- Bill Hicks – guitar, vocals
- Kevin Booth – bass, keyboards, percussion, producer
