= Aloke Dutta =

Bengali tabla player

- Born: Bishnupur, Bankura, West Bengal, India
- Instrument: tabla
- Years active: 1974-present
- Website: www.alokedutta.com

Aloke Dutta is a Bengali tabla player. He lives in Los Angeles. The tabla is almost always used for the accompaniment of a song, but Dutta is usually the melody of his pieces.

== Biography ==
Dutta was born in 1953 in Bishnupur, a small town in West Bengal, India that is known for its Hindu spirituality and achievements in art, music, and architecture. He started playing the tabla in 1974, with guidance from his father, a professor and percussionist specializing in many forms of drum, including the khol, pakhavaj, dhol, and tabla. He has lived in Los Angeles, California since 1997, after previously living in New Mexico and Texas. Dutta started out playing with other musicians, but later on, he switched to playing solo, which he still does. He also teaches the tabla, with notable students including Danny Carey, Terry Bozzio, and Pat Mastelotto.

== Discography ==
=== Albums ===
- The Window (1999)
- Scriptless Verse (2002)
- Sinuosity (2005)
- Spondaic Oblation (2007)
- NUDITYSUTRA (2014)
