= Bill Hicks =

American comedian (1961–1994)

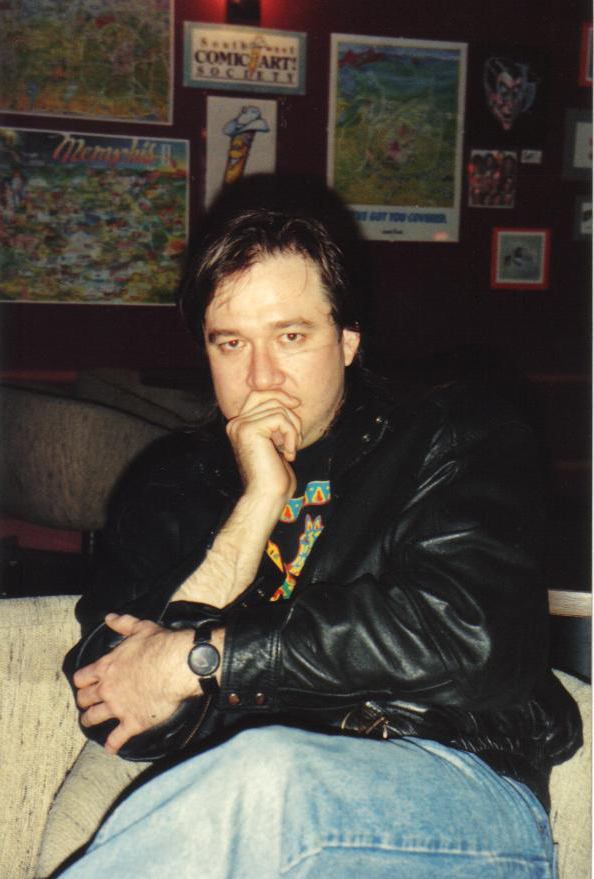
- Hicks at the Laff Stop in 1991
- Born: William Melvin Hicks; December 16, 1961; Valdosta, Georgia, U.S.
- Died: February 26, 1994 (aged 32); Little Rock, Arkansas, U.S.
- Resting place: Magnolia Cemetery, Leakesville, Mississippi, U.S.

Comedy career
- Years active: 1978–1994
- Medium: Stand-up; television; music
- Genres: Dark comedy; political satire; observational comedy
- Subjects: American culture; American politics; current events; recreational drug use; conspiracy theories
- Website: billhicks.com

Signature
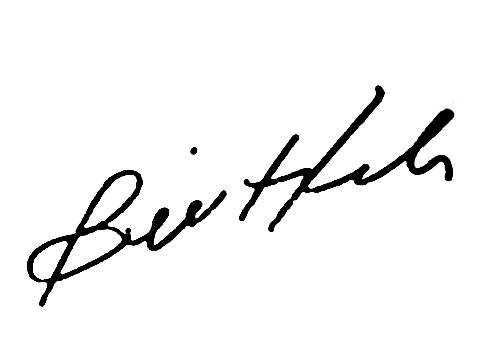

William Melvin Hicks (December 16, 1961 – February 26, 1994) was an American stand-up comedian and satirist. His material— encompassing a wide range of social issues including religion, politics, and philosophy— was controversial and often steeped in dark comedy.

At the age of 16, Hicks began performing at the Comedy Workshop in Houston, Texas. He toured the United States extensively and made a number of high-profile television appearances during the 1980s, yet amassed a significant fan base in the United Kingdom, filling large venues during his 1991 tour. He also achieved some recognition as a guitarist and songwriter.

Hicks died of pancreatic cancer on February 26, 1994, at the age of 32. In subsequent years his work gained significant acclaim in creative circles – particularly after a series of posthumous album releases – which resulted in a substantial cult following. In 2007, he was number six on Channel 4's list of the "100 Greatest Stand-Up Comics", and rose to No. 4 on the 2010 list. In 2017, Rolling Stone ranked him number 13 on its list of the 50 best stand-up comics of all time.

== Early life ==
Hicks was born in Valdosta, Georgia, the son of James Melvin "Jim" Hicks (1923–2006) and Mary (Reese) Hicks. He had an older sister, Lynn, and an older brother, Steve. The family lived in Alabama, Florida, and New Jersey before settling in Houston, Texas, when Hicks was seven years old. He was drawn to comedy at an early age, emulating Woody Allen and Richard Pryor, and wrote routines with his friend Dwight Slade. While attending Stratford High School and the University of Houston, he began performing comedy (mostly derivations of Woody Allen material) for his classmates. At home, he wrote his own one-liners and slid them under the bedroom door of Steve, who he thought was a genius, for critical analysis. Steve told him, "Keep it up. You're really good at this."

Early on, Hicks began to mock his family's Southern Baptist religious beliefs. He joked to the Houston Post in 1987, "We were Yuppie Baptists. We worried about things like, 'If you scratch your neighbor's Subaru, should you leave a note?'" Biographer Cynthia True described a typical argument with his father:

The elder Hicks would say, "I believe that the Bible is the literal word of God." And Bill would counter, "No, it's not, Dad." "Well, I believe that it is." "Well," Bill replied, "you know, some people believe that they're Napoleon. That's fine. Beliefs are neat. Cherish them, but don't share them like they're the truth."

He was close with his family his whole life, though, and he did not reject spiritual ideology itself; throughout his life, he sought various alternative methods of experiencing it. Kevin Slade, elder brother of Dwight, introduced him to Transcendental Meditation and other forms of spirituality. Over one Thanksgiving weekend, he took Hicks and Dwight to a Transcendental Meditation residence course in Galveston. Worried about his rebellious behavior, his parents took him to a psychoanalyst at age 17. According to Hicks, the analyst took him aside after the first group session and told him, "You can continue coming if you want to, but it's them, not you."

== Career ==
=== Beginnings ===
Hicks was associated with the Texas Outlaw Comics group developed at the Comedy Workshop in Houston in the 1980s.

=== California and New York ===
By January 1986, Hicks was using recreational drugs and his financial resources had dwindled. His career experienced an upturn in 1987, however, when he appeared on Rodney Dangerfield's Young Comedians Special. The same year, he moved to New York City, and for the next five years performed about 300 times a year. On the album Relentless, he jokes that he quit using drugs because "once you've been taken aboard a UFO, it's kind of hard to top that", although in his performances he continued to enthusiastically praise the virtues of LSD, marijuana, and psychedelic mushrooms.

He eventually fell back to chain smoking, a theme that figured heavily in his performances from then on. His nicotine addiction, love of smoking, and occasional attempts to quit became a recurring theme in his act throughout his later years.

In 1988, Hicks signed with his first professional business manager, Jack Mondrus.

On the track "Modern Bummer" of his 1990 album Dangerous, Hicks says he quit drinking alcohol in 1988.

In 1989, he released his first video, Sane Man; a remastered version with 30 minutes of extra footage was released in 1999.

=== Early fame ===
In 1990, Hicks released his first album, Dangerous, performed on the HBO special One Night Stand and at Montreal's Just for Laughs festival. Hicks was later engaged to his manager, Colleen McGarr, who booked him there. He was also part of a group of American stand-up comedians performing in London's West End in November. Hicks was a huge hit in the UK and Ireland and continued touring there throughout 1991. That year, he returned to Just for Laughs and filmed his second video, Relentless.

Hicks made a brief detour into musical recording with the Marble Head Johnson album in 1992, collaborating with Houston high school friend Kevin Booth and Austin, Texas, drummer Pat Brown. During the same year, he toured the UK, where he recorded the Revelations video for Britain's Channel 4. He closed the show with his oft quoted philosophy regarding life, "It's Just a Ride." Also in that tour, he recorded the stand-up performance released in its entirety on a double CD titled Salvation. Hicks was voted "Hot Standup Comic" by Rolling Stone magazine in 1993.

=== Hicks and Tool ===
Progressive metal band Tool invited Hicks to open a number of concerts in its 1993 Lollapalooza appearances, where Hicks once asked the audience to look for a contact lens he had lost. Thousands of people complied.

Members of Tool felt that Hicks and they "were resonating similar concepts". Intending to raise awareness about Hicks's material and ideas, Tool dedicated their triple-platinum album Ænima (1996) to Hicks. Both the lenticular casing of the Ænima album packaging and the chorus of the title track "Ænema" make reference to a sketch from Hicks's Arizona Bay album, in which he contemplates the idea of Los Angeles falling into the Pacific Ocean. Ænima's final track, "Third Eye", contains samples from Hicks's Dangerous and Relentless albums.

An alternate version of the Ænima artwork shows a painting of Bill Hicks, calling him "Another Dead Hero", and mentions of Hicks are found both in the liner notes and on the record.

=== Censorship and aftermath ===
In 1984, Hicks had been invited to appear on Late Night with David Letterman for the first time. He had a joke that he used frequently in comedy clubs about how he caused a serious accident that left a classmate using a wheelchair. NBC had a policy that no jokes about handicapped people would be aired, making his stand-up routine difficult to perform without mentioning words such as "wheelchair".

On October 1, 1993, Hicks was scheduled to appear on Late Show with David Letterman on CBS, where Letterman had recently moved. It was his 12th appearance on a Letterman late-night show, but his entire performance was removed from the broadcast. At that point, it was the only occasion where a comedian's entire routine was cut after taping. His stand-up routine was removed from the show, Hicks said, because Letterman's producers believed the material, which included jokes involving religion and the anti-abortion movement, was unsuitable for broadcast. Producer Robert Morton initially blamed CBS, which denied responsibility; Morton later conceded it was his decision. Although Letterman later expressed regret at the way the situation had been handled, Hicks did not appear on the show again. Hicks was undergoing chemotherapy at the time of his final Late Show appearance, unbeknownst to Letterman and most others outside of Hicks's family. He would die less than four months later.

Letterman aired the censored routine in its entirety on January 30, 2009. Hicks's mother, Mary, was present in the studio and appeared on-camera as a guest. Letterman took responsibility for the original decision to remove Hicks's set from the 1993 show. "It says more about me as a guy than it says about Bill," he said, after the set aired, "because there was absolutely nothing wrong with that".

=== Denis Leary's alleged plagiarism ===
For many years, Hicks was friends with fellow comedian Denis Leary, but in 1993, he was angered by Leary's album No Cure for Cancer, which featured lines and subject matter similar to his own routine. According to American Scream: The Bill Hicks Story by Cynthia True, hearing the album had infuriated Hicks. "All these years, aside from the occasional jibe, he had pretty much shrugged off Leary's lifting. Comedians borrowed, stole stuff, and even bought bits from one another. Milton Berle and Robin Williams were famous for it. This was different. Leary had practically taken line for line huge chunks of Bill's act and recorded it." As a result, the friendship ended abruptly.

At least three stand-up comedians have stated on-record that Leary stole Hicks's material, and copied his persona and attitude. In an interview, when Hicks was asked why he had quit smoking, he answered, "I just wanted to see if Denis would, too." In another interview, Hicks said, "I have a scoop for you. I stole [Leary's] act. I camouflaged it with punchlines, and to really throw people off, I did it before he did." During a 2003 Comedy Central Roast of Leary, comedian Lenny Clarke said that a carton of cigarettes from Hicks was backstage, with the message, "Wish I had gotten these to you sooner." This joke was cut from the final broadcast.

American Scream describes an incident in the plagiarism controversy:

Leary was in Montreal hosting the "Nasty Show" at Club Soda, and Colleen [McGarr?] was coordinating the talent, so she stood backstage and overheard Leary doing material incredibly similar to old Hicks riffs, including his perennial Jim Fixx joke: "Keith Richards outlived Jim Fixx, the runner and health nut. The plot thickens." When Leary came offstage, Colleen, more stunned than angry, said, "Hey, you know that's Bill Hicks' material! Do you know that's his material?" Leary stood there, stared at her without saying a word, and briskly left the dressing room.

== Material and style ==
Hicks' performance style was seen as a play on his audience's emotions. He expressed anger, disgust, and apathy while addressing the audience in a casual and personal manner, which he likened to merely conversing with his friends. He would invite his audiences to challenge authority and the existential nature of "accepted truth". One such message, which he often used in his shows, was delivered in the style of a news report (to draw attention to the negative slant news organizations give to any story about drugs):

Today, a young man on acid realized that all matter is merely energy condensed to a slow vibration—that we are all one consciousness experiencing itself subjectively. There is no such thing as death, life is only a dream, and we're the imagination of ourselves. Here's Tom with the weather.

American philosopher and ethnomycologist Terence McKenna was a frequent source of Hicks' most controversial psychedelic and philosophical counter-cultural material; Hicks acted out an abridged version of McKenna's "Stoned Ape" model of human evolution as a routine during several of his final shows.

Another of Hicks' most-delivered lines was given during a gig in Chicago in 1989 (later released as the bootleg I'm Sorry, Folks). After a heckler repeatedly shouted "Free Bird", Hicks screamed, "Hitler had the right idea; he was just an underachiever!" Hicks followed this remark with a misanthropic tirade calling for unbiased genocide against the whole of humanity.

Much of Hicks' routine involved direct attacks on mainstream society, religion, politics, and consumerism. In an interview recorded after one of Hicks' shows in Santa Monica and aired as part of the six-episode BBC Two series Funny Business in 1992, Hicks was asked if audiences got upset by what he said on stage. He responded by saying that occasionally audience members did not find his material funny but that not only would it be impossible to please everyone, it was not his responsibility to do so. He recounted an instance in which an audience member snidely told him "We don't come to comedy to think!" "Gee, where do you go to think?" mused Hicks. "I'll meet you there. We don't have to do this here!" When one of the interviewers then asked whether there was not a halfway point between pleasing and offending audiences, Hicks pushed back, replying "But my way is halfway between. I mean, this is a night club and, you know, these are adults, what do you expect? What you're going to see on TV? No. This isn't TV live. And also, it's my show. What am I supposed to do? Change my own outlook and my beliefs? To be what to them?" Arguing that to simply give audiences what they wanted would be a form of condescension, Hicks explained that his approach was instead to speak to audiences on equal footing, as though they were his friends. When one of the interviewers challenged that audiences just wanted to be entertained, an exasperated Hicks asked, "When did thinking not become entertaining? ... What am I supposed to do? Am I supposed to go out and tickle them individually? We have to express an idea here."

Hicks was strongly against political correctness, and jokingly stated that the politically correct should be "hunted down and killed."

== Illness and death ==
On June 16, 1993, Hicks was diagnosed with pancreatic cancer that had spread to his liver. Doctors originally gave a two month prognosis. He kept his diagnosis private. He still toured and also recorded his album, Arizona Bay, while receiving weekly chemotherapy.

Following his cancer diagnosis, Hicks often joked that any given performance could be his last. Within 4 months, the tumor shrank, however his health declined rapidly during the winter of 1993. He performed the final show of his career at Caroline's in New York on January 6, 1994; he moved back to his parents' house in Little Rock shortly thereafter.

In his last weeks, Hicks re-read J. R. R. Tolkien's The Lord of the Rings, and made telephone calls to friends to say goodbye before he stopped speaking on February 14, 1994. He died on February 26 at the age of 32, and was buried in the family grave plot in Magnolia Cemetery located in Leakesville, Mississippi.

In early 1995, Hicks's family released a brief essay he had written weeks before his death:

February 7, 1994 –

I was born William Melvin Hicks on December 16, 1961, in Valdosta, Georgia. Ugh. Melvin Hicks from Georgia. Yee Har! I already had gotten off to life on the wrong foot. I was always "awake," I guess you'd say. Some part of me clamoring for new insights and new ways to make the world a better place.

All of this came out years down the line, in my multitude of creative interests that are the tools I now bring to the Party. Writing, acting, music, comedy. A deep love of literature and books. Thank God for all the artists who've helped me. I'd read these words and off I went—dreaming my own imaginative dreams. Exercising them at will, eventually to form bands, comedy, more bands, movies, anything creative. This is the coin of the realm I use in my words – Vision.

On June 16, 1993 I was diagnosed with having "liver cancer that had spread from the pancreas." One of life's weirdest and worst jokes imaginable. I'd been making such progress recently in my attitude, my career and realizing my dreams that it just stood me on my head for a while. "Why me!?" I would cry out, and "Why now!?"

Well, I know now there may never be any answers to those particular questions, but maybe in telling a little about myself, we can find some other answers to other questions. That might help our way down our own particular paths, towards realizing my dream of New Hope and New Happiness.

Amen

I left in love, in laughter, and in truth and wherever truth, love and laughter abide, I am there in spirit.

== Legacy ==
Hicks' albums Arizona Bay and Rant in E-Minor were released posthumously in 1997 on the Voices imprint of the Rykodisc label. Dangerous and Relentless were re-released simultaneously.

At the time of his death, Hicks was working with comedian Fallon Woodland on a pilot episode of a new talk show, titled Counts of the Netherworld for Channel 4. The budget and concept had been approved, and a pilot was filmed. The Counts of the Netherworld pilot was shown at the various Tenth-Anniversary Tribute Night events around the world on February 26, 2004.

In a 2005 poll to find the Comedian's Comedian, comedians and comedy insiders voted Hicks 13th on their list of "The Top 20 Greatest Comedy Acts Ever". In "Comedy Central Presents: 100 Greatest Stand-ups of All Time" (2004), Hicks was ranked 19th. In March 2007, he was voted sixth on Britain's Channel 4 list of the 100 Greatest Stand-Up Comics, and rose to number four on the 2010 list.

Devotees have incorporated Hicks's words, image, and attitude into their own creations. By means of audio sampling, fragments of his rants, diatribes, social criticisms, and philosophies have found their way into many musical works, such as the live version of Super Furry Animals' "The Man Don't Give a Fuck" and Adam Freeland's "We Want Your Soul". His influence on the band Tool is well documented, and he is sampled at the beginning of their song "Third Eye" on Ænima (1996); he "appears" on the Fila Brazillia album Maim That Tune (1995) and on SPA's eponymously titled album SPA (1997), which are both dedicated to Hicks; and the British band Radiohead's second album The Bends (1995) is also dedicated to his memory. Hicks' joke "It's always funny until someone gets hurt; then it's just hilarious" is used as the chorus of Faith No More's song "Ricochet", from their 1995 album King for a Day... Fool for a Lifetime. American indie rock band Built to Spill's song "Planting Seeds" on its 2009 album There Is No Enemy alludes to Hicks's routine on advertising and marketing, which appears on the performance film Bill Hicks: Revelations. Singer/songwriter Tom Waits listed Rant in E-Minor as one of his 20 most cherished albums of all time.

Comedians who have cited Hicks as an inspiration include Joe Rogan, Dave Attell, Lewis Black, Patton Oswalt, David Cross, Russell Brand, Ron White, Frankie Boyle, Jimmy Dore, Lee Camp and Brendon Burns. The political cartoonist "Mr. Fish" described in 2022 how he learned from Hicks.

British actor Chas Early portrayed Hicks in the one-man stage show Bill Hicks: Slight Return, which premiered in 2004. The show was co-written by Early and Richard Hurst, and imagined Hicks's view of the world 10 years after his death.

Hicks is mentioned in the 1999 British film Human Traffic. In the movie, the young and hip club-going protagonist, "Jip", praises Hicks as an alternative thinker, and explains that he needs to get a regular infusion of Hicks's insights. Before leaving his house to start on the movie's main adventure, Jip states: "... first a daily injection of the late prophet Bill Hicks ... just to remind me not to take life too seriously." He then watches a clip of one of Hicks's rants about drugs, and how they had never affected him badly.

On February 25, 2004, British MP Stephen Pound tabled an early day motion titled "Anniversary of the Death of Bill Hicks" (EDM 678 of the 2003–04 session), the text of which reads:

That this House notes with sadness the 10th anniversary of the death of Bill Hicks, on 26th February 1994, at the age of 33 [sic]; recalls his assertion that his words would be a bullet in the heart of consumerism, capitalism and the American Dream; and mourns the passing of one of the few people who may be mentioned as being worth of inclusion with Lenny Bruce in any list of unflinching and painfully honest political philosophers.

Hicks appeared in a flashback scene in writer Garth Ennis's Vertigo comic-book series Preacher, in the story "Underworld" in issue No. 31 (Nov. 1997). Bill Hicks also appears in two chapters of Gigging, a 2026 novel by Manchester-based author and DJ Mick Beatle, in which the main character meets Hicks following his 1992 performance at the Dominion Theatre in London.

Jimmy Carr, in his 2007 book The Naked Jape (co-written with Lucy Greeves), wrote that Hicks "was one of the most celebrated recent exponents of loud, impassioned political stand-up. When Hicks got it right, when he resisted the cheap shock tactics and hit his evangelical peak, it was awesome... But the truth is that even Hicks missed his mark a lot of the time, resulting in an act that was neither funny nor moving." Stewart Lee said Hicks's "first two albums have dated badly, with their adolescent potshots at inoffensive figures from popular culture, and self-conscious rock'n'roll cool."

Dara Ó Briain has criticised what he calls "the hagiography that surrounds Bill Hicks", saying in 2009 that "Hicks has become the poster boy for a rock-journalism view of comedy, one that thinks that the only decent comedy is a very angry kind. Which is absolute nonsense and has become a complete cliche in the industry."

=== Film and documentary ===
- Annex Houston (1986) (bootleg): A video of an early stand-up performance live in Texas
- Sane Man (1989): The first official video recording of a Bill Hicks show
- Ninja Bachelor Party (1991): A low-budget comedy film produced by and starring Bill Hicks, Kevin Booth, and David Johndrow
- One Night Stand (1991): A half-hour performance recorded for the HBO stand-up series
- Relentless (1992): Recorded at the Centaur Theatre during the annual Just for Laughs Comedy Festival in Montreal, Quebec, Canada. Despite the title, the CD version of Relentless was recorded at a separate performance after the Just for Laughs festival had closed.
- Revelations (1992): A live performance at the Dominion Theatre, London, in November 1992

A documentary titled American: The Bill Hicks Story, based on interviews with his family and friends, premiered on March 12, 2010, at the South by Southwest Film Festival in Austin, Texas.

Russell Crowe announced in 2012 that he would direct a Bill Hicks biopic. Crowe was originally thought to be playing the comedian, but Mark Staufer, the actor's schoolmate and writer on the film, suggested the part remained open for casting. Joseph Gordon-Levitt was frequently mentioned as a choice by fans. Production was expected to start in 2013, but as of 2018 no further announcements regarding the film's progress have been made.

On October 28, 2018, it was announced that Richard Linklater was set to direct a biopic about Bill Hicks for the film production company Focus Features. As of December 2024, the project remains in development according to IMDB.

== Bibliography ==
- Love All the People: Letters, Lyrics, Routines
