= List of songs recorded by Tool =

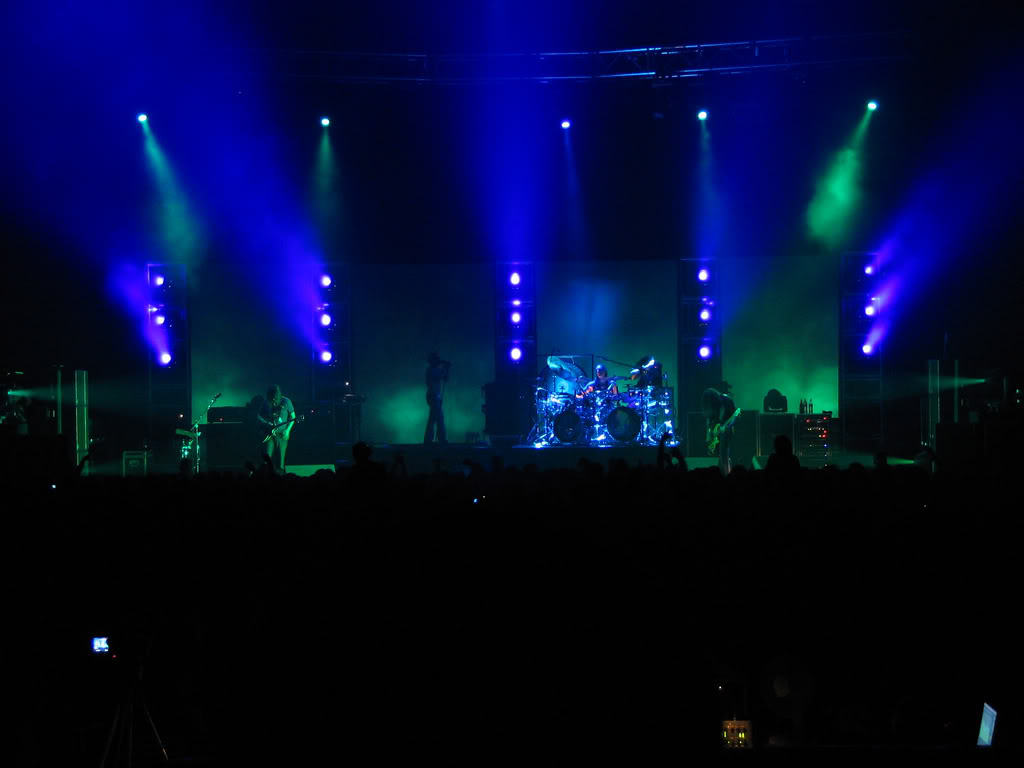
Tool performing live in 2006.

Tool is an American progressive rock band from Los Angeles, California. Formed in 1990, the band originally featured vocalist Maynard James Keenan, guitarist Adam Jones, bassist Paul D'Amour and drummer Danny Carey, although D'Amour was replaced by Justin Chancellor in 1995. The group released its first demo 72826 in 1991, which credited all four band members for songwriting. Opiate was issued the following year, which featured re-recorded versions of 72826 tracks "Hush" and "Part of Me", as well as live versions of "Cold and Ugly" and "Jerk-Off". The band released its debut full-length album Undertow in 1993, which once again credited all four band members for songwriting. The album also featured a contribution by former Black Flag and then-Rollins Band frontman Henry Rollins, who performed additional vocals on "Bottom".

After Chancellor replaced D'Amour, Tool released its second album Ænima in 1996. In 2000 the band released the compilation Salival, which featured several previously unreleased studio recordings (including a cover version of the Led Zeppelin song "No Quarter") in addition to a number of live tracks. Tool's third studio album Lateralus followed the next year, which was the band's first release to top the US Billboard 200. Five years later 10,000 Days was released, which also topped the Billboard 200 and several other albums charts around the world. Tool has been on and off hiatus in recent years, although a long-awaited fifth studio album is currently being recorded as of October 2016. In August 2019, Tool released Fear Inoculum.

== Songs ==
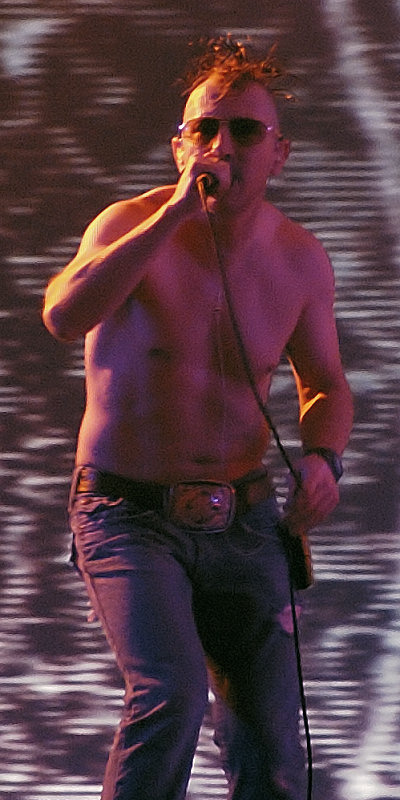
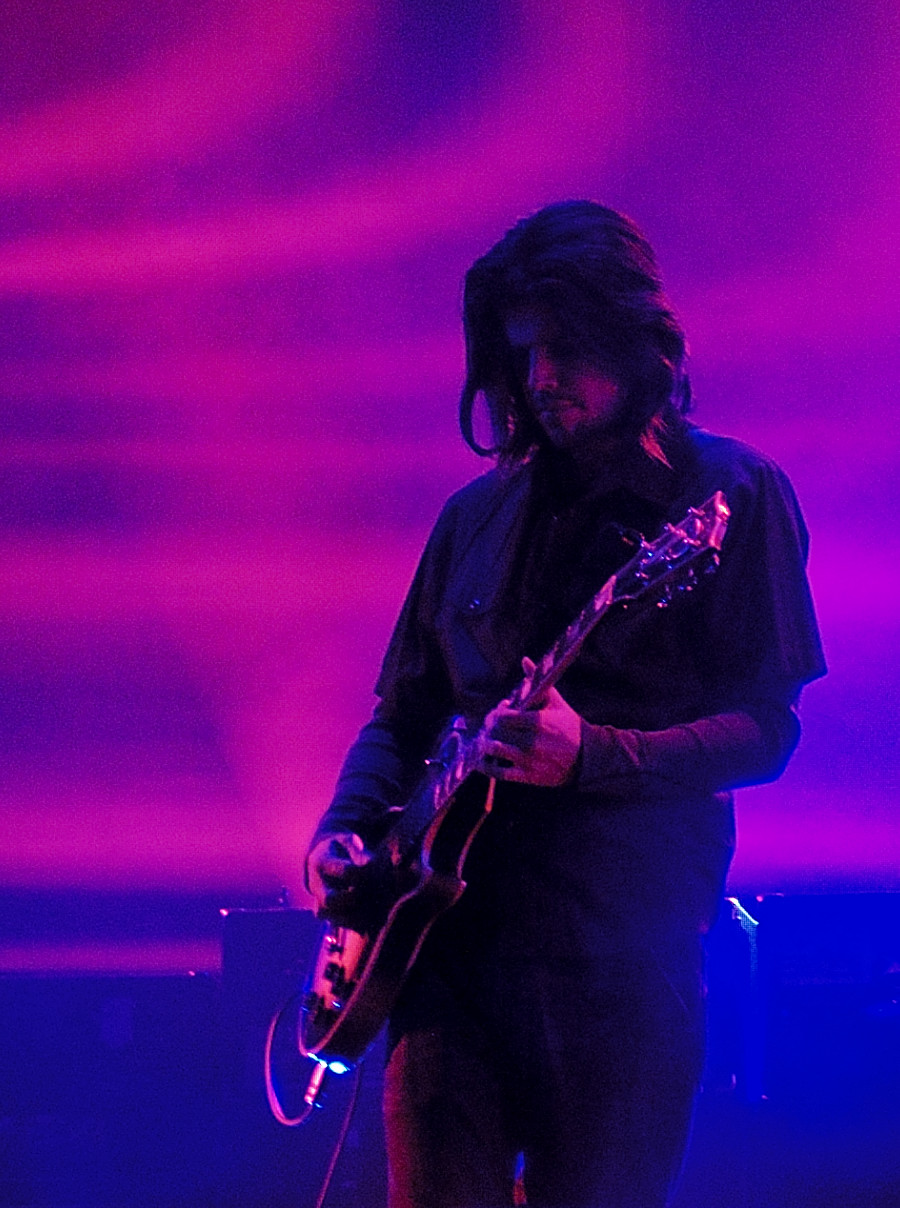
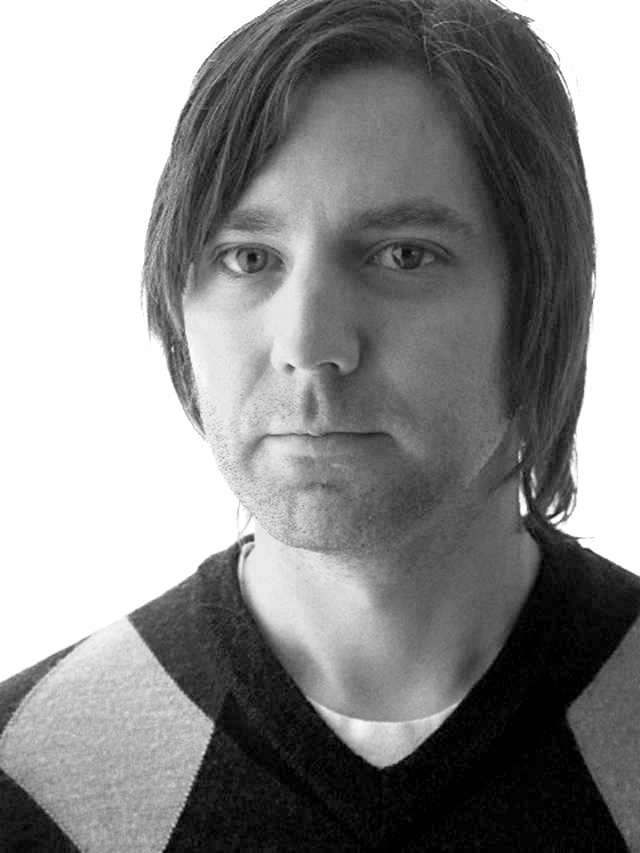
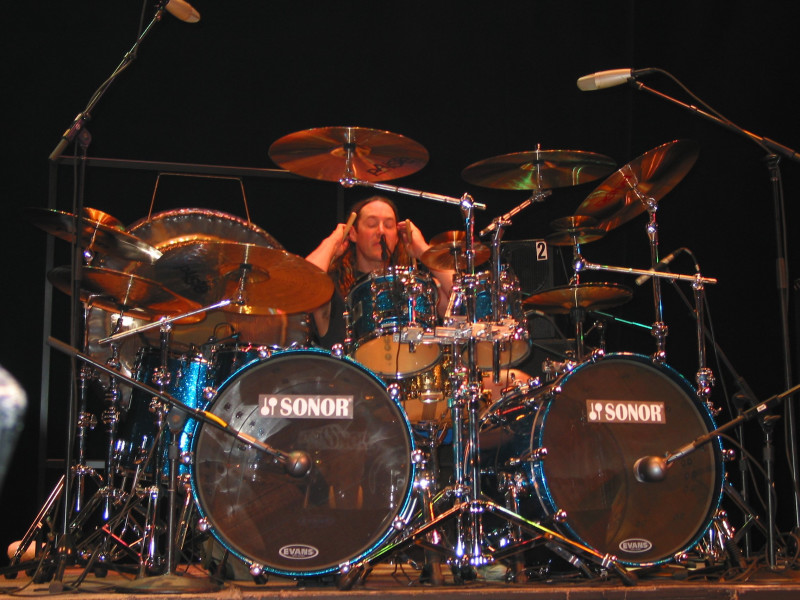
The original lineup of Tool comprised (top to bottom) vocalist Maynard James Keenan, guitarist Adam Jones, bassist Paul D'Amour and drummer Danny Carey.

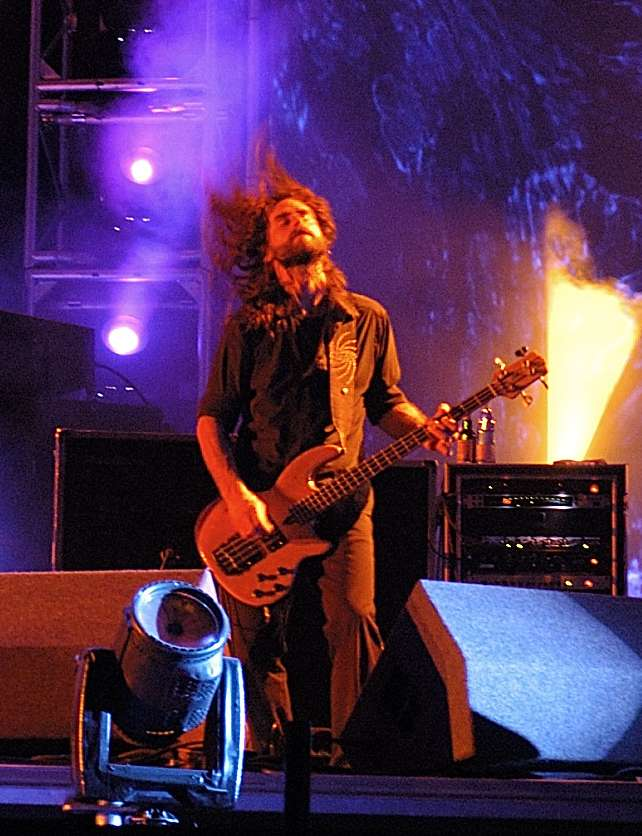
Justin Chancellor replaced D'Amour on bass in 1995, first writing and recording on the band's second album Ænima.

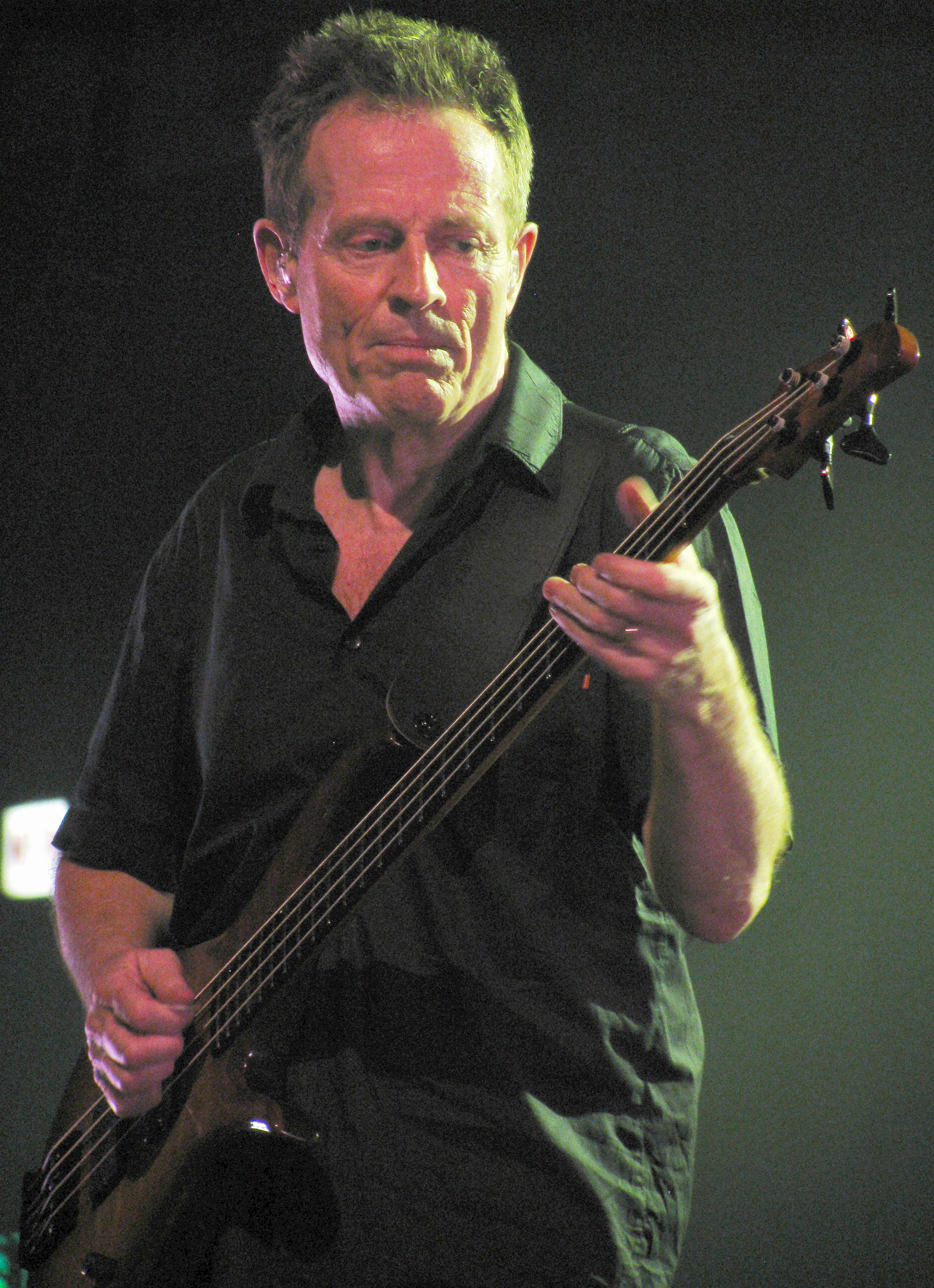
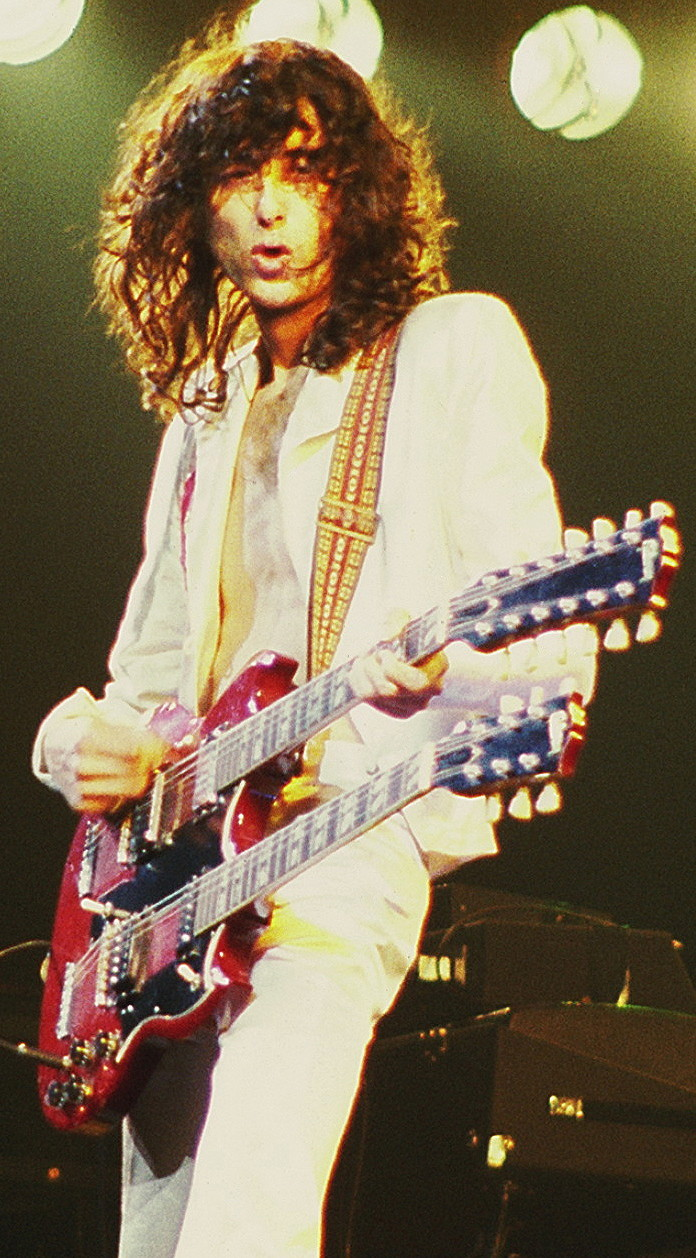
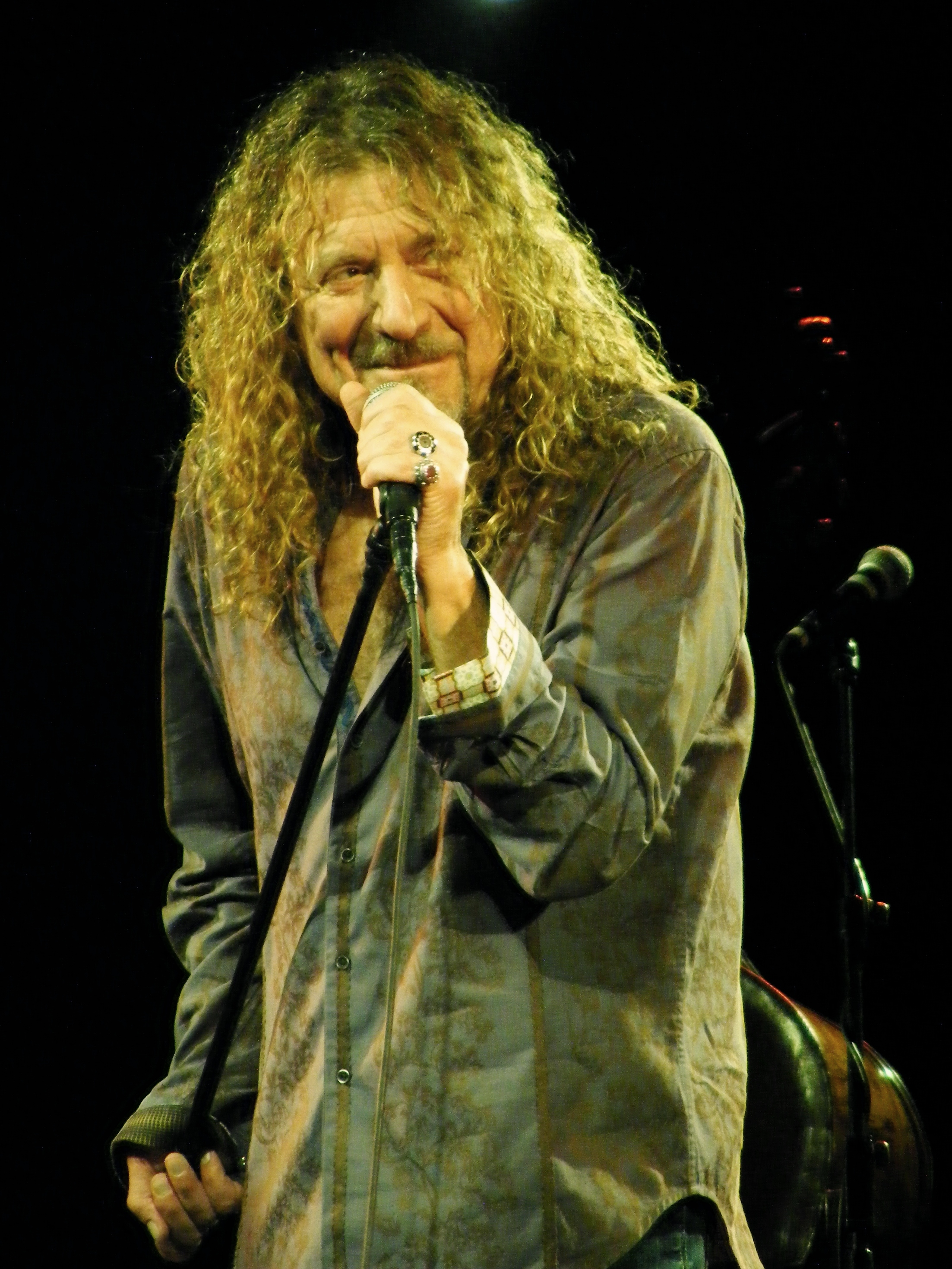
In 2000, the band released a cover version of the Led Zeppelin track "No Quarter", written by John Paul Jones (top), Jimmy Page (middle) and Robert Plant (bottom).

Key
†	Indicates song released as a single
‡	Indicates song written by the whole band

Title	Credited writer(s)	Release	Year	Ref.	Notes
"(-) Ions"	Maynard James Keenan; Adam Jones; Justin Chancellor; Danny Carey ‡	Ænima	1996		
"10,000 Days (Wings Pt 2)"	Maynard James Keenan; Adam Jones; Justin Chancellor; Danny Carey ‡	10,000 Days	2006		
"4°"	Maynard James Keenan; Adam Jones; Paul D'Amour; Danny Carey ‡	Undertow	1993		
"Ænema" †	Maynard James Keenan; Adam Jones; Justin Chancellor; Danny Carey ‡	Ænima	1996		
"Bottom"	Maynard James Keenan; Adam Jones; Paul D'Amour; Danny Carey; Henry Rollins ‡	Undertow	1993		(Note: "Bottom" features additional vocals by Henry Rollins.)
"Cesaro Summability"	Maynard James Keenan; Adam Jones; Justin Chancellor; Danny Carey ‡	Ænima	1996		
"Chocolate Chip Trip"	Maynard James Keenan; Adam Jones; Justin Chancellor; Danny Carey ‡	Fear Inoculum	2019		
"Cold and Ugly"	Maynard James Keenan; Adam Jones; Paul D'Amour; Danny Carey ‡	72826	1991		(Note: "Hush", "Part of Me" and two live versions of "Cold and Ugly" and "Jerk-Off" were also later released on Opiate.)
"Crawl Away"	Maynard James Keenan; Adam Jones; Paul D'Amour; Danny Carey ‡	Undertow	1993		(Note: "Crawl Away" was originally released on 72826.)
"Culling Voices"	Maynard James Keenan; Adam Jones; Justin Chancellor; Danny Carey ‡	Fear Inoculum	2019		
"Descending"	Maynard James Keenan; Adam Jones; Justin Chancellor; Danny Carey ‡	Fear Inoculum	2019		
"Die Eier von Satan"	Maynard James Keenan; Adam Jones; Justin Chancellor; Danny Carey ‡	Ænima	1996		
"Disgustipated"	Maynard James Keenan; Adam Jones; Paul D'Amour; Danny Carey ‡	Undertow	1993		
"Disposition"	Maynard James Keenan; Adam Jones; Justin Chancellor; Danny Carey ‡	Lateralus	2001		
"Eon Blue Apocalypse"	Maynard James Keenan; Adam Jones; Justin Chancellor; Danny Carey ‡	Lateralus	2001		
"Eulogy"	Maynard James Keenan; Adam Jones; Paul D'Amour; Danny Carey ‡	Ænima	1996		
"Faaip de Oiad"	Maynard James Keenan; Adam Jones; Justin Chancellor; Danny Carey ‡	Lateralus	2001		
"Fear Inoculum" †	Maynard James Keenan; Adam Jones; Justin Chancellor; Danny Carey ‡	Fear Inoculum	2019		
"Flood"	Maynard James Keenan; Adam Jones; Paul D'Amour; Danny Carey ‡	Undertow	1993		
"Forty Six & 2" †	Maynard James Keenan; Adam Jones; Justin Chancellor; Danny Carey ‡	Ænima	1996		
"H." †	Maynard James Keenan; Adam Jones; Paul D'Amour; Danny Carey ‡	Ænima	1996		
"Hooker with a Penis"	Maynard James Keenan; Adam Jones; Justin Chancellor; Danny Carey ‡	Ænima	1996		
"Hush"	Maynard James Keenan; Adam Jones; Paul D'Amour; Danny Carey ‡	72826	1991		
"Intension"	Maynard James Keenan; Adam Jones; Justin Chancellor; Danny Carey ‡	10,000 Days	2006		
"Intermission"	Maynard James Keenan; Adam Jones; Justin Chancellor; Danny Carey ‡	Ænima	1996		
"Intolerance"	Maynard James Keenan; Adam Jones; Paul D'Amour; Danny Carey ‡	Undertow	1993		
"Invincible"	Maynard James Keenan; Adam Jones; Justin Chancellor; Danny Carey ‡	Fear Inoculum	2019		
"Jambi" †	Maynard James Keenan; Adam Jones; Justin Chancellor; Danny Carey ‡	10,000 Days	2006		
"Jerk-Off"	Maynard James Keenan; Adam Jones; Paul D'Amour; Danny Carey ‡	72826	1991		
"Jimmy"	Maynard James Keenan; Adam Jones; Justin Chancellor; Danny Carey ‡	Ænima	1996		
"LAMC"	Maynard James Keenan; Adam Jones; Justin Chancellor; Danny Carey ‡	Salival	2000		(Note: "LAMC" stands for "Los Angeles Municipal Court".)
"Lateralus" †	Maynard James Keenan; Adam Jones; Justin Chancellor; Danny Carey ‡	Lateralus	2001		
"Legion Inoculant"	Maynard James Keenan; Adam Jones; Justin Chancellor; Danny Carey ‡	Fear Inoculum	2019		
"Lipan Conjuring"	Maynard James Keenan; Adam Jones; Justin Chancellor; Danny Carey ‡	10,000 Days	2006		
"Litanie contre la Peur"	Maynard James Keenan; Adam Jones; Justin Chancellor; Danny Carey ‡	Fear Inoculum	2019		
"Lost Keys (Blame Hofmann)"	Maynard James Keenan; Adam Jones; Justin Chancellor; Danny Carey ‡	10,000 Days	2006		
"Mantra"	Maynard James Keenan; Adam Jones; Justin Chancellor; Danny Carey ‡	Lateralus	2001		
"Maynard's Dick"	Maynard James Keenan; Adam Jones; Justin Chancellor; Danny Carey ‡	Salival	2000		(Note: "Maynard's Dick" is a hidden track featured at the end of the song "LAMC".)
"Message to Harry Manback"	Maynard James Keenan; Adam Jones; Justin Chancellor; Danny Carey ‡	Ænima	1996		
"Message to Harry Manback II"	Maynard James Keenan; Adam Jones; Justin Chancellor; Danny Carey ‡	Salival	2000		
"Mockingbeat"	Maynard James Keenan; Adam Jones; Justin Chancellor; Danny Carey ‡	Fear Inoculum	2019		
"No Quarter"	John Paul Jones; Jimmy Page; Robert Plant	Salival	2000		(Note: "No Quarter" was originally recorded by Led Zeppelin.)
"Opiate"	Maynard James Keenan; Adam Jones; Paul D'Amour; Danny Carey ‡	Opiate	1992		
"Parabol"	Maynard James Keenan; Adam Jones; Justin Chancellor; Danny Carey ‡	Lateralus	2001		
"Parabola" †	Maynard James Keenan; Adam Jones; Justin Chancellor; Danny Carey ‡	Lateralus	2001		
"Part of Me"	Maynard James Keenan; Adam Jones; Paul D'Amour; Danny Carey ‡	72826	1991		
"Pneuma"	Maynard James Keenan; Adam Jones; Justin Chancellor; Danny Carey ‡	Fear Inoculum	2019		
"Prison Sex" †	Maynard James Keenan; Adam Jones; Paul D'Amour; Danny Carey ‡	Undertow	1993		
"Pushit"	Maynard James Keenan; Adam Jones; Paul D'Amour; Danny Carey ‡	Ænima	1996		
"Reflection"	Maynard James Keenan; Adam Jones; Justin Chancellor; Danny Carey ‡	Lateralus	2001		
"Right in Two"	Maynard James Keenan; Adam Jones; Justin Chancellor; Danny Carey ‡	10,000 Days	2006		
"Rosetta Stoned"	Maynard James Keenan; Adam Jones; Justin Chancellor; Danny Carey ‡	10,000 Days	2006		
"Schism" †	Maynard James Keenan; Adam Jones; Justin Chancellor; Danny Carey ‡	Lateralus	2001		
"Sober" †	Maynard James Keenan; Adam Jones; Paul D'Amour; Danny Carey ‡	Undertow	1993		
"Stinkfist" †	Maynard James Keenan; Adam Jones; Paul D'Amour; Danny Carey ‡	Ænima	1996		
"Swamp Song"	Maynard James Keenan; Adam Jones; Paul D'Amour; Danny Carey ‡	Undertow	1993		
"Sweat"	Maynard James Keenan; Adam Jones; Paul D'Amour; Danny Carey ‡	Opiate	1992		
"The Gaping Lotus Experience"	Maynard James Keenan; Adam Jones; Paul D'Amour; Danny Carey ‡	Opiate	1992		(Note: "The Gaping Lotus Experience" is a hidden track featured at the end of the song "Opiate".)
"The Grudge"	Maynard James Keenan; Adam Jones; Justin Chancellor; Danny Carey ‡	Lateralus	2001		
"The Patient"	Maynard James Keenan; Adam Jones; Justin Chancellor; Danny Carey ‡	Lateralus	2001		
"The Pot" †	Maynard James Keenan; Adam Jones; Justin Chancellor; Danny Carey ‡	10,000 Days	2006		
"Third Eye"	Maynard James Keenan; Adam Jones; Justin Chancellor; Danny Carey ‡	Ænima	1996		
"Ticks & Leeches"	Maynard James Keenan; Adam Jones; Justin Chancellor; Danny Carey ‡	Lateralus	2001		
"Triad"	Maynard James Keenan; Adam Jones; Justin Chancellor; Danny Carey ‡	Lateralus	2001		
"Undertow"	Maynard James Keenan; Adam Jones; Paul D'Amour; Danny Carey ‡	Undertow	1993		
"Useful Idiot"	Maynard James Keenan; Adam Jones; Justin Chancellor; Danny Carey ‡	Ænima	1996		
"Vicarious" †	Maynard James Keenan; Adam Jones; Justin Chancellor; Danny Carey ‡	10,000 Days	2006		
"Viginti Tres"	Maynard James Keenan; Adam Jones; Justin Chancellor; Danny Carey ‡	10,000 Days	2006		
"Wings for Marie (Pt 1)"	Maynard James Keenan; Adam Jones; Justin Chancellor; Danny Carey ‡	10,000 Days	2006		
"7empest"	Maynard James Keenan; Adam Jones; Justin Chancellor; Danny Carey ‡	Fear Inoculum	2019		

== See also ==
- Tool discography
