= Tool discography =

Band discography

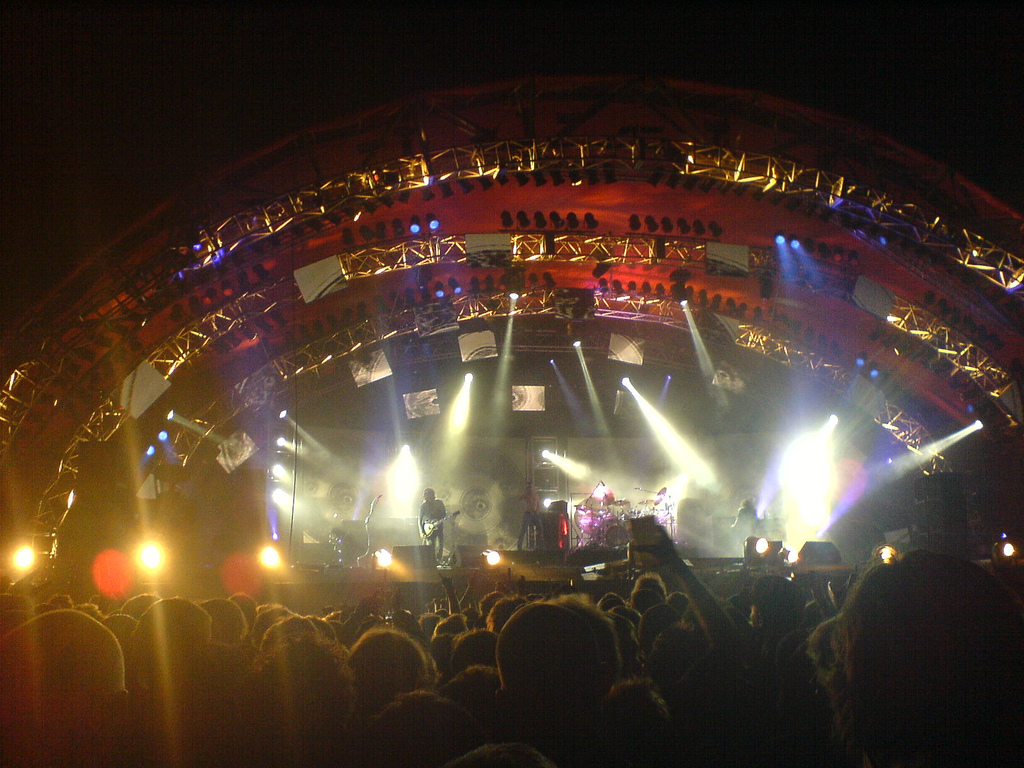
- Tool at the Roskilde Festival in 2006
- Studio albums: 5
- Extended plays: 2
- Singles: 16
- Video albums: 4
- Music videos: 8
- Box sets: 1

The discography of American rock band Tool consists of five studio albums, one box set, two extended plays, four video albums, sixteen singles and eight music videos.

Tool was founded in 1990 by vocalist Maynard James Keenan and guitarist Adam Jones, who then recruited drummer Danny Carey and bassist Paul D'Amour. They initially released a demo EP in 1991 called 72826. Although demos are typically intended only for record labels, the band was so pleased with theirs that they sold copies to their fans. Tool signed to Zoo Entertainment just three months into their career, and released their first studio EP, Opiate, in March 1992. After touring to positive reviews, they released their first full-length album, Undertow, in April 1993. The album was certified triple platinum by the Recording Industry Association of America (RIAA) in 2021.

Shortly after entering the studio to record their second album in September 1995, the band experienced its only lineup change to date, with bassist D'Amour leaving amicably to pursue other projects. He was replaced by Justin Chancellor and recording resumed. October 1996 saw the release of Ænima which eventually beat Tool's debut in sales, and was certified triple platinum by the RIAA in 2003. The third single from the album, "Ænema", won the Grammy Award for Best Metal Performance in 1998. Following legal battles with their label, the band went on hiatus. Tool returned in May 2001 with the release of Lateralus. The album reached number one on the US Billboard 200 chart in its debut week, and was certified triple platinum in April 2021. The first single, "Schism", won a Grammy Award for Best Metal Performance in 2002. Again waiting five years between releases, 10,000 Days was released in May 2006. The album sold 564,000 copies in its opening week in the US, debuted at number one on the Billboard 200, and was certified double platinum by the RIAA in April 2021. The album won a Grammy Award for Best Recording Package in 2007. In August 2019, Tool released Fear Inoculum. In March 2022, Tool re-released the song "Opiate" as a single titled "Opiate²". This was a re-recorded version of "Opiate", as the Opiate EP turned 30 years old that year.

== Albums ==
=== Studio albums ===
List of studio albums, with selected chart positions, sales figures and certifications
Title	Album details	Peak chart positions										Sales	Certifications
Title	Album details	US	AUS	CAN	FRA	GER	NLD	NZ	SWE	SWI	UK	Sales	Certifications
Undertow	Released: April 6, 1993 (US); Label: Zoo; Formats: CD, CS, LP	19	21	32	—	—	89	17	—	—	— (Note: Undertow did not enter the UK Albums Chart, but peaked at number 37 on the UK Album Downloads Chart.)		RIAA: 3× Platinum; ARIA: Platinum; BPI: Silver; MC: Platinum; RMNZ: Gold
Ænima	Released: September 17, 1996 (US); Label: Zoo; Formats: CD, CS, LP	2	6	3	—	75	75	1	53	79	108		RIAA: 3× Platinum; ARIA: 3× Platinum; BPI: Gold; MC: Platinum; RMNZ: 2× Platinum
Lateralus	Released: May 15, 2001 (US); Label: Volcano; Formats: HDCD (on the most pressings), CD, CS, LP	1	1	1	21	5	7	2	8	31	16		RIAA: 3× Platinum; ARIA: 2× Platinum; BPI: Gold; MC: 2× Platinum; RMNZ: Platinum
10,000 Days	Released: May 2, 2006 (US); Label: Volcano; Formats: CD, LP	1	1	1	7	2	1	1	2	3	4		RIAA: 2× Platinum; ARIA: Platinum; BPI: Gold; BVMI: Gold; MC: Platinum; RMNZ: 2× Platinum
Fear Inoculum	Released: August 30, 2019; Label: Volcano, RCA; Formats: CD, Digital download, LP	1	1	1	9	2	3	1	7	2	4	US: 390,000	RIAA: Gold; MC: Gold; RMNZ: Platinum
"—" denotes a recording that did not chart or was not released in that territory.

=== Box sets ===
List of box sets, with selected chart positions
Title	Album details	Peak chart positions	
Title	Album details	US	AUS
Salival	Released: December 12, 2000 (US); Label: Volcano; Format: CD+VHS, CD+DVD	38	29

=== Extended plays ===
List of extended plays, with selected chart positions and certifications
Title	EP details	Peak chart positions							Certifications
Title	EP details	US	US Rock	AUS	CAN	SWI	UK DL	UK Rock	Certifications
72826	Released: December 21, 1991 (US); Label: Toolshed Music; Formats: CS; Demo release	—	—	—	—	—	—	—	
Opiate	Released: March 10, 1992 (US); Label: Zoo; Formats: CD, CS, LP	59	12	43	85	87	41	16	RIAA: Platinum; ARIA: Platinum
"—" denotes a recording that did not chart or was not released in that territory.

== Singles ==
List of singles, with selected chart positions, showing year released and album name
Title	Year	Peak chart positions										Certifications	Album
Title	Year	US	US Rock	AUS	CAN	GER	IRE	NLD	NZ	SCO	UK	Certifications	Album
"Hush"	1992	—	—	—	—	—	—	—	—	—	—		Opiate (EP)
"Sober"	1993	— (Note: "Sober" did not enter the Billboard Hot 100, but peaked at number six on the Digital Song Sales chart.)	3	131	— (Note: "Sober" did not enter the Billboard Canadian Hot 100, but peaked at number 10 on the Canadian Digital Song Sales chart.)	—	—	—	—	—	—	RMNZ: 2× Platinum	Undertow
"Prison Sex"	1993	— (Note: "Prison Sex" did not enter the Billboard Hot 100, but peaked at number 36 on the Digital Song Sales chart.)	18	172	—	—	—	—	—	73	81		Undertow
"Stinkfist"	1996	— (Note: "Stinkfist" did not enter the Billboard Hot 100, but peaked at number 13 on the Digital Song Sales chart.)	7	126	— (Note: "Stinkfist" did not enter the Billboard Canadian Hot 100, but peaked at number 25 on the Canadian Digital Song Sales chart.)	—	—	—	—	—	—	RMNZ: Platinum	Ænima
"H."	1997	—	— (Note: "H." did not enter the Hot Rock Songs chart, but peaked at number 16 on the Rock Digital Songs chart.)	—	—	—	—	—	—	—	—	RMNZ: Gold	Ænima
"Ænema"	1997	— (Note: "Ænema" did not enter the Billboard Hot 100, but peaked at number 19 on the Digital Song Sales chart.)	9	—	— (Note: "Ænema" did not enter the Billboard Canadian Hot 100, but peaked at number 46 on the Canadian Digital Song Sales chart.)	—	—	—	—	—	—	RMNZ: Gold	Ænima
"Forty Six & 2"	1998	— (Note: "Forty Six & 2" did not enter the Billboard Hot 100, but peaked at number 12 on the Digital Song Sales chart.)	6	152	— (Note: "Forty Six & 2" did not enter the Billboard Canadian Hot 100, but peaked at number 21 on the Canadian Digital Song Sales chart.)	—	—	—	—	—	—	RMNZ: 2× Platinum	Ænima
"Schism"	2001	67	5	— (Note: "Schism" did not enter the Australian ARIA Singles Chart but peaked at number 16 on the ARIA Hitseekers Chart.)	— (Note: "Schism" did not enter the Billboard Canadian Hot 100, but peaked at number 16 on the Canadian Digital Song Sales chart.)	—	—	56	—	—	—	RMNZ: Platinum	Lateralus
"Parabola"	2002	—	14	—	—	—	—	54	—	—	—	RMNZ: Platinum	Lateralus
"Lateralus"	2002	— (Note: "Lateralus" did not enter the Billboard Hot 100, but peaked at number 29 on the Digital Song Sales chart.)	17	—	—	—	—	—	—	—	—		Lateralus
"Vicarious"	2006	— (Note: "Vicarious" did not enter the Billboard Hot 100, but peaked at number 15 on the Bubbling Under Hot 100 chart.)	11	—	— (Note: "Vicarious" did not enter the Billboard Canadian Hot 100, but peaked at number 42 on the Canadian Digital Song Sales chart.)	71	—	—	—	—	—	RMNZ: Gold	10,000 Days
"The Pot"	2006	— (Note: "The Pot" did not enter the Billboard Hot 100, but peaked at number 20 on the Digital Song Sales chart.)	8	—	— (Note: "The Pot" did not enter the Billboard Canadian Hot 100, but peaked at number 27 on the Canadian Digital Song Sales chart.)	—	—	—	—	—	—	RMNZ: 2× Platinum	10,000 Days
"Jambi"	2007	—	21	—	—	—	—	—	—	—	—	RMNZ: Gold	10,000 Days
"Fear Inoculum"	2019	93	3	68	76	—	—	—	40	76	— (Note: "Fear Inoculum" did not enter the UK Singles Chart, but peaked at number 62 on the UK Singles Sales Chart.)	RMNZ: Gold	Fear Inoculum
"Pneuma"	2020	—	4	78	—	—	84	—	— (Note: "Pneuma" did not enter the NZ Top 40 Singles Chart, but peaked at number 11 on the NZ Hot Singles Chart.)	—	—	RMNZ: Platinum	Fear Inoculum
"Opiate²"	2022	— (Note: "Opiate^{2}" did not enter the Billboard Hot 100, but peaked at number 32 on the Digital Song Sales chart.)	— (Note: "Opiate^{2}" did not enter the Hot Rock Songs chart, but peaked at number one on the Rock Digital Songs chart.)	— (Note: "Opiate^{2}" did not enter the Australian ARIA Singles Chart but peaked at number 40 on the ARIA Digital Track Chart.)	— (Note: "Opiate^{2}" did not enter the Billboard Canadian Hot 100, but peaked at number 49 on the Canadian Digital Song Sales chart.)	—	—	—	— (Note: "Opiate^{2}" did not enter the NZ Top 40 Singles Chart, but peaked at number 34 on the NZ Hot Singles Chart.)	—	— (Note: "Opiate²" did not enter the UK Singles Chart, but peaked at number 33 on the UK Video Chart.)		Non-album single
"—" denotes a recording that did not chart or was not released in that territory.

== Other charted songs ==
List of other charted songs, with selected chart positions, showing year released and album name
Title	Year	Peak chart positions								Certifications	Album
Title	Year	US DL	US Act. Rock	US Hard Rock	US Rock	AUS	IRE	NZ Hot	UK Rock	Certifications	Album
"Opiate"	1992	—	—	— (Note: "Opiate" did not enter the Hot Hard Rock Songs chart, but peaked at number 18 on the Hard Rock Digital Songs chart.)	— (Note: "Opiate" did not enter the Hot Rock Songs chart, but peaked at number 21 on the Rock Digital Songs chart.)	181	—	—	—		Opiate (EP)
"Eulogy"	1996	44	31	— (Note: "Eulogy" did not enter the Hot Hard Rock Songs chart, but peaked at number 11 on the Hard Rock Digital Songs chart.)	22	—	—	—	—	RMNZ: Gold	Ænima
"The Grudge"	2001	—	—	— (Note: "The Grudge" did not enter the Hot Hard Rock Songs chart, but peaked at number 24 on the Hard Rock Digital Songs chart.)	—	—	—	—	—		Lateralus
"Right in Two"	2006	—	—	— (Note: "Right in Two" did not enter the Hot Hard Rock Songs chart, but peaked at number 22 on the Hard Rock Digital Songs chart.)	—	—	—	—	—		10,000 Days
"Litanie contre la peur"	2019	—	—	—	—	150	—	—	28		Fear Inoculum
"Invincible"	2019	—	—	25	5	89	95	3	12	RMNZ: Gold	Fear Inoculum
"Legion Inoculant"	2019	—	—	—	—	158	—	—	34		Fear Inoculum
"Descending"	2019	—	—	—	7	— (Note: "Descending" did not enter the Australian ARIA Singles Chart but peaked at number seven on the ARIA Hitseekers Chart.)	—	6	20		Fear Inoculum
"Culling Voices"	2019	—	—	—	13	169	—	—	33		Fear Inoculum
"Chocolate Chip Trip"	2019	—	—	—	15	—	—	—	—		Fear Inoculum
"7empest"	2019	—	—	—	6	117	—	7	19		Fear Inoculum
"—" denotes a recording that did not chart or was not released in that territory.

== Videos ==
=== Video albums ===
List of video albums, with selected chart positions and certifications
Title	Album details	Peak chart positions					Certifications
Title	Album details	US	US Video	AUS DVD	JPN DVD	UK Video	Certifications
Salival	Released: December 12, 2000 (US); Label: Volcano; Formats: VHS, DVD	38	1	4	19	22	
Schism	Released: December 20, 2005 (US); Label: Volcano; Formats: DVD	—	54	4	300	25	RIAA: Gold
Parabola	Released: December 20, 2005 (US); Label: Volcano; Formats: DVD	—	12	2	1	24	RIAA: Gold
Vicarious	Released: December 18, 2007 (US); Label: Volcano; Formats: DVD	—	21	28	77	—	RIAA: 2× Platinum; ARIA: Gold
Opiate²	Released: March 18, 2022; Label: RCA; Formats: Blu-Ray	—	—	—	—	1	
"—" denotes a recording that did not chart or was not released in that territory.

=== Music videos ===
List of music videos, showing year released and director
Title	Year	Director(s)
"Hush"	Recorded in 1992, released in 2000	Ken Andrews
"Sober"	1993	Adam Jones, Fred Stuhr
"Prison Sex"	1994	Adam Jones
"Stinkfist"	1996	Adam Jones
"Ænema"	1997	Adam Jones
"Schism"	2001	Adam Jones
"Parabola"	2002	Adam Jones
"Vicarious"	2007	Adam Jones, Alex Grey
"Opiate^{2}"	2022	Adam Jones, Dominic Hailstone
