= Fear Inoculum (song) =

2019 song by Tool

Single by Tool

from the album Fear Inoculum
- Released: August 7, 2019
- Recorded: 2018
- Genre: Progressive metal
- Length: 10:21
- Label: Tool Dissectional; Volcano; RCA
- Songwriters: Danny Carey; Justin Chancellor; Adam Jones; Maynard James Keenan
- Producer: Tool

Tool singles chronology
"Jambi" (2007)	"Fear Inoculum" (2019)	"Pneuma" (2020)

"Fear Inoculum" is a song by American rock band Tool. The song was released as the title track and lead single from their fifth studio album Fear Inoculum. It was released on August 7, 2019, the first new Tool song since the release of their previous album 10,000 Days. Upon its debut on the Billboard Hot 100, "Fear Inoculum" broke the Guinness World Record for the longest song ever to chart on the Hot 100, overtaking David Bowie's "Blackstar", until André 3000 broke the record again in 2023 with "I Swear, I Really Wanted to Make a 'Rap' Album but This Is Literally the Way the Wind Blew Me This Time".

== Reception ==
Loudwire described the song as having "Middle Eastern drum patterns" and called it a "slow burn building to big, cathartic crescendos". They also praised Keenan's vocals, noting the lyrics "seem to address a rejection of fear and negativity from outside sources." Loudersound described the song as "a lengthy, polyrhythmic song that slowly reveals its secrets. A carefully calculated trip that nevertheless hits emotional pressure points." Metalsucks praised the song's mixing, Carey's drumming and Jones's guitar tone. It was nominated for Best Rock Song at the 2020 Grammy Awards.

== Chart performance ==
The song debuted at number 93 on the Billboard Hot 100, the band's first entry since "Schism" in 2001, and became the longest song in the chart's history to make an entry, breaking the record held by David Bowie's "Blackstar". It debuted on the Billboard Top Rock Songs chart at number 4 on the August 17 release.

== Personnel ==
- Maynard James Keenan – vocals
- Adam Jones – guitar
- Justin Chancellor – bass
- Danny Carey – drums, percussion

== Charts ==
=== Weekly charts ===
Weekly chart performance for "Fear Inoculum"
Chart (2019)	Peak position
Australia (ARIA)	68
Belgium (Ultratip Bubbling Under Flanders)	7
Canada Hot 100 (Billboard)	76
Canada Rock (Billboard)	25
France (SNEP Sales Chart)	130
New Zealand (Recorded Music NZ)	40
New Zealand Hot Singles (RMNZ)	3
Scotland Singles (OCC)	76
UK Singles Sales (OCC)	62
UK Singles Downloads (OCC)	58
UK Rock & Metal (OCC)	24
US Billboard Hot 100	93
US Hot Rock & Alternative Songs (Billboard)	3
US Rock & Alternative Airplay (Billboard)	11

=== Year-end charts ===
Year-end chart performance for "Fear Inoculum"
Chart (2019)	Position
US Hot Rock & Alternative Songs (Billboard)	36
