= Rosetta Stoned =

2006 song by Tool

Song by Tool

from the album 10,000 Days
- Released: April 28, 2006
- Recorded: August–December 2005
- Genre: Progressive metal; experimental metal; progressive rock; post-metal; psychedelic rock
- Length: 11:12
- Label: Tool Dissectional; Volcano
- Songwriters: Danny Carey; Justin Chancellor; Adam Jones; Maynard James Keenan
- Producer: Tool

"Rosetta Stoned" is a song by American rock band Tool. It was released on April 28, 2006, as the eighth track off their fourth studio album, 10,000 Days.

Structurally, the song contains complex fast-to-slow drum fills, performed by the band's drummer Danny Carey. The song uses 4/4, 5/8, 5/4, 9/8, 11/8, 3/4, and 6/4 time signatures and is characterized by its aggressive riffs. The song also features unconventional percussion instruments and polyrhythms.

The name of the song is a reference to the Rosetta Stone. Lyrically, the song deals with a man's encounter with aliens, spiritual realizations, and his state of a coma after a DMT trip. The song is written in a stream of consciousness style.

The preceding track on the album, "Lost Keys (Blame Hofmann)" serves as a conceptually synchronized prologue for the song. It depicts a conversation between a patient (Albert Hofmann), a nurse and a doctor (R. Gordon Wasson), which occurs after the event in "Rosetta Stoned".

The song generally received positive reviews from critics. It was also praised for its arranging and performances, especially due to Danny Carey's "multi-limbed" percussion skills and creative drumming. Critics also likened the song to The Grateful Dead's works. The similarities between this song and another Tool song, "Third Eye," also have been noted. Nick Cowen from Drowned in Sound gave a positive review to the song, appreciating its narration, intense mood, and guitar work. The song was also musically compared to an extensive jam.

== Personnel ==
- Danny Carey – drums
- Maynard James Keenan – vocals
- Adam Jones – guitar
- Justin Chancellor – bass guitar
