= The Pot =

Song by Tool

Promotional single by Tool

from the album 10,000 Days
- Released: 2006
- Recorded: 2005
- Genre: Alternative metal; progressive metal; hard rock
- Length: 6:22
- Label: Volcano II; Tool Dissectional (US)
- Songwriters: Danny Carey; Justin Chancellor; Adam Jones; Maynard James Keenan
- Producer: Tool

"The Pot" is a song by American rock band Tool, which was released as a promotional single from their fourth studio album 10,000 Days (2006).

It became Tool's first number one song, topping the Billboard Mainstream Rock chart in 2007. It also received a Grammy nomination for Best Hard Rock Performance in 2008.

== Background ==
According to Adam Jones, the song lyrics center around hypocrisy and reference both drug intoxication and believing oneself to be above others, deriving from the phrase "the pot calling the kettle black".

According to The Rock Radio, a music video was filmed during the holiday season in 2006; however, it never surfaced. A fan video for the song, synced to the short film Les Escargots (The Snails) by French animator René Laloux, has been widely adopted by fans as the official video.

== Track listing ==
Australian and Polish promotional CD
No.	Title	Length
1.	"The Pot"	6:22

== Credits and personnel ==
Tool

- Maynard James Keenan – vocals
- Adam Jones – guitars
- Justin Chancellor – bass
- Danny Carey – drums

Production

- Joe Barresi – engineering and mixing
- Bob Ludwig – mastering

== Charts ==
=== Weekly charts ===
Weekly chart performance for "The Pot"
Chart (2006–2007)	Peak position
US Alternative Airplay (Billboard)	5
US Mainstream Rock (Billboard)	1

=== Year-end charts ===
2006 year-end chart performance for "The Pot"
Chart (2006)	Position
US Mainstream Rock Songs (Billboard)	29

2007 year-end chart performance for "The Pot"
Chart (2007)	Position
US Mainstream Rock Songs (Billboard)	17

== Certifications ==
Certifications and sales
Region	Certification	Certified units/sales
New Zealand (RMNZ)	2× Platinum	60,000^{‡}
^{‡} Sales+streaming figures based on certification alone.
