= Vicarious (song) =

2006 song by Tool

Single by Tool

from the album 10,000 Days
- Released: April 17, 2006; December 18, 2007 (CD and DVD)
- Recorded: August–December 2005
- Genre: Progressive metal
- Length: 7:06
- Label: Volcano II; Tool Dissectional (US)
- Songwriters: Danny Carey; Justin Chancellor; Adam Jones; Maynard James Keenan
- Producer: Tool

Tool singles chronology
"Lateralus" (2002)	"Vicarious" (2006)	"Jambi" (2007)

Promotional cover

"Vicarious" is a song by the American rock band Tool. The song is the lead single released from their fourth full-length studio album 10,000 Days. Debuting on Maynard James Keenan's 42nd birthday, April 17, 2006 on commercial radio, the seven-minute song debuted on the Billboard Alternative Songs and Mainstream Rock Tracks charts both at number two. It received a nomination for Best Hard Rock Performance at the 49th Annual Grammy Awards.

== Overview ==
The song features a 5/4 riff and describes the vicarious thrill the public receives from living through others in the media eye.

The song reached no. 2 on both the Mainstream Rock and Alternative Songs charts.

In the June 12, 2008 issue of Rolling Stone magazine, the song was ranked number 100 on the list of top 100 guitar songs of all time.

== Music video ==
The DVD released on December 18, 2007 contains an extended version of the much-delayed video counterpart for the song. The video is completely made through use of CGI, making it Tool's second full CGI video, as opposed to stop-motion animation, which the band has used in their past videos.

The video was co-directed by guitarist Adam Jones and artist Alex Grey and also features creative input from Chet Zar. Also included on the DVD are short documentaries on the making of the video and on Jones's previous work in film and television, and commentaries on the video from comedian David Cross.

The music video begins with a humanoid whose internal organs and bones are visible through a transparent skin. The humanoid is standing in the middle of a dry desert devoid of any vegetation and water. The humanoid observes a ball-like object with tentacles scraping the desert floor at a distance. The Sun appears to be undergoing a solar eclipse, with the Sun's outer corona visible. Two glass-like walls appear in front of the humanoid which show multiple reflections of him. An insect-like creature comes and walks on the humanoid and the glass-like walls. Two fish-like creatures emerge from the main humanoid's eyes. One of them enters into the eclipse while the other enters into an eye appearing on the hand of one of the humanoids. The flea-like creature releases a ball-like object with tentacles, similar to the one seen in the desert earlier, from an eye on its back. The main humanoid then collapses and a fetus is shown gestating in the head. The video's setting then changes to a dimension showing an infinite number of heads interconnected with burning spheres underneath (identical to Alex Grey's work Net of Being). Eventually, another humanoid - with the fish-like creatures emanating from his eyes, and his torso trailing into a ghostly tail - enters into one of the burning spheres and it releases a long fiery arm which goes into an eye of one of the heads and then emerges from the hand on the eye of the main humanoid in the desert. The glass walls then shatter, the insect-like creature starts spraying particles, and the sphere figure with tentacles collapses onto the desert floor. The main humanoid then appears to "transcend" with flashes of light around his body. The music video ends with a single eye appearing in the clouds on an Earth-like planet.

The Tool venue in Guitar Hero World Tour bears a lot of elements from the scene involving the multiple god heads and spheres of energy.

== Personnel ==
- Maynard James Keenan — vocals
- Adam Jones — guitar
- Justin Chancellor — bass
- Danny Carey — drums

== Charts ==
=== Weekly charts ===
Weekly chart performance for "Vicarious"
Chart (2006)	Peak position
US Bubbling Under Hot 100 (Billboard)	15
US Alternative Airplay (Billboard)	2
US Mainstream Rock (Billboard)	2

=== Year-end charts ===
Year-end chart performance for "Vicarious"
Chart (2006)	Position
US Alternative Songs (Billboard)	12
US Mainstream Rock Songs (Billboard)	12

== Certifications ==
Certifications for "Vicarious"
Region	Certification	Certified units/sales
United States (RIAA) Video single	2× Platinum	100,000^{^}
^{^} Shipments figures based on certification alone.
