= Schism (song) =

2001 single by Tool

Single by Tool

from the album Lateralus
- Released: January 15, 2001
- Recorded: 2000
- Genre: Progressive metal
- Length: 6:46
- Label: Volcano
- Songwriters: Adam Jones; Maynard James Keenan; Justin Chancellor; Danny Carey
- Producers: Tool; David Bottrill

Tool singles chronology
"Forty Six & 2" (1998)	"Schism" (2001)	"Parabola" (2002)

Promotional cover
- Cover for the promotional single of "Schism".

"Schism" is a song by American rock band Tool. It was the first single and music video from their third full-length album, Lateralus. In 2002, Tool won the Grammy Award for Best Metal Performance for the song. "Schism" was released as a DVD single on December 20, 2005. The DVD contains the music video, audio commentary by David Yow, and a remix by Lustmord. The song is memorable by fans for its use of uncommon time signatures and the frequency of its meter changes. In 2013, the staff of Loudwire included the song's main riff in their list of "the 10 Best Metal Riffs of the 2000s".

== Background ==
Most of the songs on Lateralus use math and science as metaphors for human issues. Singer Maynard James Keenan says, "They're all about relationships. Learning how to integrate communication back into a relationship. How are we as lovers, as artists, as brothers - how are we going to reconstruct this beautiful temple that we've built and that's tumbled down? It's universal relationship stuff." As for the trademark hook, bassist Justin Chancellor said, "The twiddly 'Schism' riff came from fooling around. I just play as much as possible, and I don't write stuff down - so when I get a good idea, I play it until I can't forget it."

== Overview ==
"Schism" is known as a prime example of Tool's use of complex rhythms and changing meters. It is also well known for its distinctive bass line throughout. An extended version of the song is performed live. "Schism" was Tool's only entry on the Billboard Hot 100 until "Fear Inoculum" in 2019, peaking at number 67 and staying on the charts for 20 weeks. It also hit number two on both the Alternative Songs and Mainstream Rock Tracks charts. It almost reached number one on both charts, but was blocked behind Staind's "It's Been Awhile".

The song is featured in the video game Guitar Hero World Tour.

== Music video ==
The music video for "Schism" was created with stop-motion animation techniques featuring live actors and was directed by the band's guitarist Adam Jones.

The video revolves around two humanoids, one male and one female presumably in a room with what looks like a letter "X" on the wall. The first humanoid has what appears to be red twigs and stems growing out of its head. The first humanoid starts to sink into the floor but then pulls itself out while the second humanoid sinks into the room. The second humanoid appears at first to be unconscious but is able to levitate on its own. The first humanoid takes the second humanoid and plows its head against the floor in a circle and then places the humanoid on a small ledge in the room.

Later the first humanoid ventures off into other parts of the room while the second humanoid gains consciousness and follows the first humanoid. The two humanoids then walk around the room on both their hands and feet while bobbing their heads together. The first humanoid then gently grabs the ear of the second humanoid and pulls out a large block of the humanoid's flesh.

The setting of the video then changes and goes into the arteries and veins of the block of flesh that was taken out of the second humanoid and depicts a stop motion animated creature that ventures through the blood vessels in the flesh. The first humanoid then pulls out what appears to be a black stem out of the second humanoid’s neck which it later drops on the floor. The stem melts and then reanimates into the same stop motion animated creature seen in the vessels. The creature then changes into a stop motion animated creature with only a mouth.

The room then fills with gas and the first humanoid collapses on the floor where the stop motion creature bites itself onto the humanoid's face. Later, similar creatures appear and proceed to do the same thing. The humanoid pulls the creatures off of its face and drops them on the floor. Later the twigs on the humanoid's head grow at an exponential rate which the humanoid then tears off. The music video ends with the two humanoids joined together as if they were co-joined twins.

== Time signature ==
"Schism" is renowned for its use of uncommon time signatures and the frequency of its meter changes. In one analysis of the song, the song alters meter 47 times. The song begins with two bars of 5/4, followed by one bar of 4/4, followed by bars of alternating 5/8 and 7/8, until the first interlude, which consists of alternating bars of 6/8 and 7/8.

The following verse exhibits a similar pattern to the first, alternating bars of 5/8 and 7/8. The next section is four bars of 6/4 followed by one bar of 11/8. This takes the song back into alternating 5/8 and 7/8. Another 6/8 and 7/8 section follows, and after this the song goes into repeating bars of 5/8 and 9/8. The section ends with the music hanging suspended over a bar of 9/8.

The middle section is subsequently introduced at 3:29, maintaining a group of three bars of 6/8 then one of 9/8 until 5:02. Then a series of 8/4, 10/4, 8/4, 8/4, then 9/8 heading into "Between supposed lovers..." which is a three bar group of 9/8, 10/8 and 9/8, played twice.

It breaks down with a measure of 13/8 then 9/8. 5/8 then 9/8 repeats 3 times then 5/8 and 6/8 once. The signature riff takes over again, 5/8 then 7/8. The final riff is 8/8.

The band has referred to the time signature as ^{6 1/2}_{8}.

== Track listing ==
Promotional single

No.	Title	Length
1.	"Schism"	6:46

DVD

No.	Title	Length
1.	"Schism" (music video)	7:29
2.	"Schism" (music video commentary)	7:29
3.	"Schism" (Lustmord remix)	20:13

== Credits and personnel ==
Tool

- Danny Carey – drums
- Justin Chancellor – bass
- Adam Jones – guitar
- Maynard James Keenan – vocals

Production

- Produced by David Bottrill
- Art direction by Adam Jones

== Chart performance ==
Chart (2001-19)	Peak position
UK Rock & Metal (OCC)	32
US Billboard Hot 100	67
US Alternative Airplay (Billboard)	2
US Mainstream Rock (Billboard)	2
