= Jambi (Tool song) =

2007 song by Tool

Single by Tool

from the album 10,000 Days
- Released: February 12, 2007
- Recorded: August–December 2005
- Genre: Progressive metal
- Length: 7:28
- Label: Volcano II; Tool Dissectional
- Songwriters: Danny Carey; Justin Chancellor; Adam Jones; Maynard James Keenan
- Producer: Tool

Tool singles chronology
"Vicarious" (2006)	"Jambi" (2007)	"Fear Inoculum" (2019)

"Jambi" is a song by American rock band Tool. The song was released as a single and the second track from their fourth studio album 10,000 Days. It was made officially available for radio airplay on February 12, 2007.

== Overview ==
"Jambi" both begins in and is primarily in 9/8 time, interspersed with sections of 6/4. The entire band's first change to 6/4 begins in the section immediately preceding the guitar solo and continues through the solo. During the solo, Adam Jones uses a talk box effect; Justin Chancellor plays in 6/4, but unlike the rest of the band, he subdivides the riff into a pulse of 4+2; Danny Carey accompanies in 6/4 with a 4 over 3 polyrhythm to link the bass's subdivisions with the rest of the band. As the solo ends and the song moves into the next section, the drums and bass shift back into 9/8 while the guitar remains in 6/4 to create a polymeter. Once the 9/8 vocals rejoin, the guitar shifts back into 9/8. The entire band then remains in 9/8 until moving back into 6/4 for the final two measures, which reuses the first two measures of the first 6/4 section.

Drummer Danny Carey stated that when bassist Justin Chancellor played the bass track of the song, it instantly reminded him of the children's television program Pee-wee's Playhouse, then singer Maynard James Keenan thought of the genie "Jambi" and had the idea to make the song's theme about making wishes.

== Track listing ==
US promotional CD single
No.	Title	Length
1.	"Jambi" (Half Solo Edit)	6:23
2.	"Jambi" (Album Version)	7:28

== Charts ==
=== Weekly charts ===
Weekly chart performance for "Jambi"
Chart (2007)	Peak position
US Alternative Airplay (Billboard)	23
US Mainstream Rock (Billboard)	7

=== Year-end charts ===
Year-end chart performance for "Jambi"
Chart (2007)	Position
US Mainstream Rock Songs (Billboard)	28
