= Mandala Drum =

Electronic musical instrument

The Mandala Drum is a patented electronic drum pad developed by Vince DeFranco (Synesthesia Corporation) with drummer Danny Carey from Tool. Its surface has 128 strike position detection rings from its center to its edge, along with 127 levels of velocity sensitivity. The pad can be struck with drum sticks or fingers and hands. In its current iteration, V3, both values are transmitted via USB MIDI to a computer, where they can be interpreted by any MIDI enabled software. The V3 also offers 5-pin MIDI output which does not require a computer connection. Previous Mandala versions (v2 and mk2.9) included their own "Virtual Brain" software. Those USB/software systems replaced a hardware brain that the Mandala v1 system had employed.

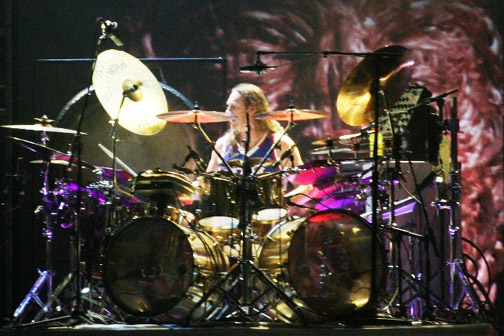
Danny Carey of Tool using 7 Mandala Drums

== Technology ==
The Mandala pad represents patented membrane sensor technology that was developed over several years by Vince DeFranco and was released to the public in May 2006.

Because a Mandala surface is divided into 128 position rings and can detect 127 strike velocities (greater than 0) it can produce up to 16,256 (128 x 127) individual triggers. For practical playing the pad surface is divided into multiple concentric trigger zones. The individual playing zones, underlying position rings, and velocity levels can be used to trigger different musical notes and change effects parameters. Mandala sensor technology can detect both standard impacts and sustained presses and slides.

== Mandala V3 ==
The newest version of the Mandala, V3, was released in 2024 and is both a standard class-compliant USB MIDI controller (no special drivers required) and a 5-pin MIDI controller for direct connection to electronic musical instrument hardware with no computer connection required. Mandala V3 sensor technology is updated and offers 4 surface trigger zones, 128 surface position rings, 9 rim trigger zones, and continuous slide and pressure sensing. When a surface zone is struck the V3 sends a MIDI note trigger with velocity as well as a position value (in the form of a MIDI continuous controller) across a USB cable into a computer or across a MIDI cable to hardware with a MIDI input port. If the surface is engaged the V3 will also output pressure and slide data as MIDI continuous controllers. When a rim zone is struck the V3 outputs a MIDI note trigger. If a rim is engaged the V3 will also send associated pressure data as a MIDI continuous controller. Mandala V3 MIDI output can be remapped using a V3 Utility app. The V3 also offers an interchangeable output cartridge which can be replaced to accommodate future developments. The V3 does not include any audio software and was designed for playability with existing third-party software and hardware.

== Mandala mk2.9 ==
The previous version of the Mandala, mk2.9, is now out of production and is a standard class-compliant USB MIDI controller which requires a computer as its sound source. A Virtual Brain program was included which had a set of instrument samples and multiple effects (filters, delay, distortion, etc.) which could be applied to individual zones or to the overall surface. User samples could also be added to the included sound library. Any parameter of any effect can be controlled by the position (0−127) or velocity (1−127) of a surface strike, resulting in effects such as bending pitch, changing delay time, or increasing reverb as the pad is played from center to edge. The position controller and velocity controller can be scaled to the player's liking. Factory preset sound configurations are included with the Virtual Brain as well as empty slots for user created presets. Drummers can also modify panning and note settings for each zone. The Virtual Brain program is not required to play the Mandala mk2.9 because the pad is a standard MIDI controller for any MIDI compatible software.

== Mandala v2 ==
Version 2 of the Mandala preceded the mk2.9 and is also now out of production. The v2 is a standard class-compliant USB MIDI controller which requires a computer as its sound source. A Virtual Brain program was introduced with the v2.

== Mandala v1 ==
Version 1 of the Mandala included a standalone hardware 'brain' with an onboard sound chip and effects. That version is no longer available.

== Endorsers ==
- Danny Carey Tool
- Pat Mastelotto King Crimson
- Will Calhoun Living Colour
- Michael Cavanagh King Gizzard and the Lizard Wizard
- Abe Cunningham Deftones
- Matt Chamberlain Pearl Jam/Bowie/Peter Gabriel/Tori Amos/Critters Buggin +
- Igor Cavalera Sepultura/Cavalera Conspiracy/Mixhell +
- Aaron Harris ISIS
- Joe Barresi Producer, Engineer: The Melvins/Tool/Queens of the Stone Age/Weezer/Wolfmother +
- Jaron Lanier Computer Scientist/Composer/Visual Artist/Author
- Lol Tolhurst The Cure/Levinhurst
