= 7empest =

Song by Tool

Song by Tool

from the album Fear Inoculum
- Released: August 30, 2019
- Recorded: 2018
- Genre: Progressive metal
- Length: 15:43
- Label: Tool Dissectional; Volcano; RCA
- Songwriters: Maynard James Keenan, Adam Jones, Justin Chancellor, Danny Carey
- Producer: Tool

"7empest" (pronounced "tempest") is a song by American rock band Tool. At over 15 minutes in length, it is the final song on the band's fifth studio album, Fear Inoculum. The song peaked at number 6 on the Billboard Hot Rock Songs chart and was cited by critics as a standout track from the album. It later won the Grammy Award for Best Metal Performance.

== Background ==
The song was first released on August 30, 2019, with the rest of the Fear Inoculum album; while some songs had been teased or played live over the course of the 13-year wait for the album's release, "7empest" had not been revealed prior. Upon release, the song charted and peaked at number 6 on the Billboard Hot Rock Songs chart. The song made its live debut at the band's Sydney performance on February 18, 2020.

== Composition and themes ==
"7empest" is 15 minutes and 43 seconds in length, moving through many different segments, time signatures, and structures. The song opens with around 80 seconds of softer, clean guitar work before moving into a heavier, distorted guitar riff. While the guitar riffs are described as reminiscent of Lateralus or Ænima, the vocals that kick in from Maynard James Keenan are noted for sounding aggressive, similar to the band's earlier work, kicking in with the lines "Keep calm...keep calm...Fuck, here we go again!" in the opening lines. Keenan sings through two verses of vitriolic lyrics, condemning an unnamed person with lyrics of "acting all surprised when you're caught in a lie/ We know better, we know your nature!" From there, the song enters an extended instrumental interlude, with guitarist Adam Jones going through many guitar riffs and guitar solos; with publications like Metal Hammer noting that, while many bands would build entire songs around the riffs, Tool instead runs through them once or twice and then moves on to the next one. Keenan breaks up the instrumental interludes to aggressively chant the phrase "A tempest must be just that", before the song breaks back into more instrumental interlude, including some squealing "Jimi Hendrix-esque solos before returning to softer, clean guitar notes reminiscent of the intro are played again as an outro.

Neither Keenan, the band's primary lyricist, nor the rest of the band have shed any light on the lyrical meaning of the song, though Rolling Stone theorized that it may allude to William Shakespeare's final play The Tempest.

== Reception ==
The song was singled out as the best song of the Fear Inoculum album by a number of different publications, including Esquire, Loudwire, Metal Hammer, Radio.com, MetalSucks, and Alternative Press. The song was declared the number one song of 2019 from Revolver. Esquire praised the song for fitting in the best aspects of every single one of Tool's prior studio albums, and felt the song alone made the 13 year wait for the album worth it. Loudwire deemed the song "the greatest achievement of guitarist Adam Jones' entire career.

In 2020, the song won the Grammy Award for Best Metal Performance.

== Personnel ==
- Maynard James Keenan – vocals
- Adam Jones – guitar
- Justin Chancellor – bass
- Danny Carey – drums, percussion

== Charts ==
Chart (2019)	Peak position
Australia (ARIA)	117
US Hot Rock & Alternative Songs (Billboard)	6
