= 10,000 Days (Tool album) =

- Digital cover. On physical formats, the cover features a flap with two large 3D lenses over the eyes.

Studio album by Tool
- Released: April 28, 2006
- Recorded: August – December 2005
- Studios: O'Henry Sound, Burbank, California; Grandmaster, Hollywood, California; The Loft, Hollywood, California; BAY 7 Studios, Valley Village, California
- Genres: Progressive metal; alternative metal
- Length: 75:45
- Labels: Tool Dissectional; Volcano
- Producer: Tool

Tool chronology
Lateralus (2001)	10,000 Days (2006)	Fear Inoculum (2019)

Singles from 10,000 Days
- 1. "Vicarious" Released: April 22, 2006; 2. "The Pot" Released: July 2006; 3. "Jambi" Released: February 12, 2007

10,000 Days is the fourth studio album by the American rock band Tool. The album was released by Tool Dissectional and Volcano Entertainment in parts of Europe on April 28, 2006, in Australia on April 29, 2006, in the United Kingdom on May 1, 2006, and in North America on May 2, 2006. It marked the first time since recording 1993's Undertow that the band had worked at Grandmaster and without producer David Bottrill. 10,000 Days spawned three top ten rock singles: "Vicarious", "The Pot", and "Jambi".

It debuted at number one on the Billboard 200 chart, with first week sales of 564,000 copies. The album was awarded a double platinum certification by both the RIAA and the RMNZ. It was also certified platinum in both Australia and Canada, and gold in Belgium, Germany, Ireland, Poland, and the United Kingdom.

10,000 Days was Tool's last release for more than a decade; the band would not release their next studio album, Fear Inoculum, until August 30, 2019.

== Background and recording ==
Tool recorded the album at O'Henry Sound Studios in Burbank, as well as at The Loft and Grandmaster Studios in Hollywood, California. It was mixed at Bay 7 in North Hollywood, CA and mastered at Gateway Mastering Studios in Portland, Maine.

Guitarist Adam Jones employed various recording techniques for the album, including a "pipe bomb mic" (a guitar pickup mounted inside a brass cylinder), and a talk box guitar solo on the song "Jambi." Drummer Danny Carey operated many of the sound effects on the interlude tracks on the album using electronic drums called Mandalas. 10,000 Days has a heavier sound than its predecessor, largely because of the influence of avant-garde metal band Fantômas, who toured with Tool before the writing process.

The title 10,000 Days is thought to refer to the orbital period of the planet Saturn (the actual time period is 10,759 days). According to singer Maynard James Keenan, the Saturn return is "the time in your twenty eighth, twenty ninth year when you are presented the opportunity to transform from whatever your hang-ups were before to let the light of knowledge and experience lighten your load, so to speak, and let go of old patterns and embrace a new life." Keenan expected that the songs composed would "chronicle that process, hoping that my gift back would be to share that path and hope that I could help somebody get past that spot." The title 10,000 Days additionally refers to the amount of time that Maynard's mother, Judith Marie Gridley, was paralyzed.

== Packaging and artwork ==
The compact disc packaging for 10,000 Days consists of a thick cardboard-bound booklet partly covered by a flap holding a pair of stereoscopic eyeglasses, which can be used to view a series of images inside. Viewed with the glasses, the artwork produces an illusion of depth and three-dimensionality. Alex Grey, who created a majority of the album art for Lateralus and its accompanying video "Parabola," reprised his role for 10,000 Days. The CD face itself is decorated with stylized eyes, arranged in a seemingly logarithmic spiral toward the center (adapted from a previous Alex Grey painting, "Net of Being"). As with Tool's other albums, the lyrics are not printed within the artwork; vocalist Maynard James Keenan has instead released the lyrics online. On May 5, 2006, the band's official webmaster hinted that "the four individual photos [of the band members] can be used as the pieces of a kind of puzzle," but the puzzle and its meaning "will just be another nut to crack."

In an interview, Alex Grey, who worked on the illustrations for the 10,000 Days and Lateralus covers, said that many of his artworks for Tool have been based on and influenced by the visionary journeys of a brew called ayahuasca. He described the 10,000 Days cover as "a blazing vision of an infinite grid of Godheads during an ayahuasca journey", and also talked about the Lateralus cover in a similar fashion. Grey stated in another interview when making the 10,000 Days cover that it depicts visions received during a DMT trip.

== Release ==
On March 27, 2006, Billboard posted an article about 10,000 Days, which mentioned that "Vicarious" would be the album's first single. "Vicarious" was officially released to radio on April 17, and entered both the Modern Rock Tracks and Mainstream Rock Tracks charts at number 2. A music video for the song was released on DVD on December 18, 2007. The song has also been featured as a playable track on the video game Guitar Hero World Tour. The second single from the album was "The Pot", which peaked at No. 5 on the Modern Rock chart. It was the band's first number 1 single on the Mainstream Rock chart. A video for "The Pot" was scheduled to shoot over the 2006 holiday season. "Jambi" was the third radio single and received airtime on both Modern and Mainstream Rock formats.

== Reception ==
Professional ratings
Aggregate scores
Source	Rating
Metacritic	68/100
Review scores
Source	Rating
AllMusic	4/5 stars
Alternative Press	5/5 stars
Drowned in Sound	8/10
Los Angeles Times	3/4 stars
NME	8/10
Pitchfork	5.9/10
PopMatters	6/10
Rolling Stone	3.5/5 stars
Stylus Magazine	D+
Tiny Mix Tapes	3/5 stars

10,000 Days received generally favorable reviews, albeit with less enthusiasm than previous Tool albums. Most critics praised the album as another example of Tool's musicianship. Critics who gave 10,000 Days a relatively low score questioned the merits of its ambient interludes, which Tool have also used on their previous releases.

However, the album received a Grammy Award in 2006 for Best Recording Package. That same year, the song "Vicarious" was nominated for the Grammy Award for Best Hard Rock Performance. In 2008, 10,000 Days garnered another Grammy nomination when "The Pot" was nominated for Best Hard Rock Performance.

At Metacritic, which assigns a normalized rating out of 100 to reviews from critics, the album received an average score of 68, which indicates "generally favorable reviews", based on 19 reviews. Rob Theakston of AllMusic wrote: "It's not only a step forward for the band, but a re-embracing of the epic-length rock songs found at the roots of early heavy metal." Nick Cowen of Drowned in Sound praised the album, describing it as "probably the most engagingly brilliant heavy metal album that'll be released on a major label all year." Alternative Press magazine wrote: "As with everything in Tool's oeuvre, 10,000 Days packs enough beauty, heartache and triumph that it will be dissected, studied and envied by younger bands for years to come." Evan Serpick of Rolling Stone stated that on the album, the band "maintains a level of craftsmanship and virtuosity unparalleled in metal."

Nevertheless, Adrien Begrand of PopMatters stated: "Stupendously packaged, the music robustly mixed and often achieving new levels of bleak beauty, 10,000 Days is too strong a work to call a disappointment, but the constant need to fill out a CD to 75-80 minutes is threatening to become the band's undoing." Jess Harvell of Pitchfork Media was critical in his assessment of the album: "Rather than delving further into experimentation or exploring their strengths, Tool have made an...A Perfect Circle record." Ayo Jegede of Stylus Magazine panned the album, criticizing the band in the terms of "being progressive": "I'm not sure, but I think "progressive" is about growth and change. I think it's about not being trapped in your own little universe where everything you say matters."

Rolling Stone magazine ranked the album as the 38th Best Album of 2006.

The album won a 2006 Metal Storm Award for Best Alternative Metal Album.

== Commercial performance ==
10,000 Days entered the U.S. Billboard 200 chart at number 1, selling 564,000 copies in its first week. It was Tool's second album to top the Billboard 200 chart upon release. In the UK, the album debuted at number 4, the highest chart position the group have managed in that country. It was certified Platinum in the U.S. by the RIAA on June 9, 2006.

== Track listing ==
All tracks are written by Danny Carey, Justin Chancellor, Adam Jones, and Maynard James Keenan.

No.	Title	Length
1.	"Vicarious"	7:06
2.	"Jambi"	7:28
3.	"Wings for Marie (Pt 1)"	6:11
4.	"10,000 Days (Wings Pt 2)"	11:13
5.	"The Pot"	6:21
6.	"Lipan Conjuring"	1:11
7.	"Lost Keys (Blame Hofmann)"	3:46
8.	"Rosetta Stoned"	11:11
9.	"Intension"	7:21
10.	"Right in Two"	8:55
11.	"Viginti Tres"	5:02
Total length:		75:45

== Personnel ==
- Maynard James Keenan – vocals
- Adam Jones – guitars, sitar, talkbox on "Jambi"
- Justin Chancellor – bass, additional guitar (7)
- Danny Carey – drums, percussion, tabla

=== Guest musicians ===
- Lustmord – weather effects on "10,000 Days (Wings Pt 2)"
- Bill McConnell – vocals on "Lipan Conjuring"
- Pete Riedling – voice of "Doctor Lawson" on "Lost Keys (Blame Hofmann)"
- Camella Grace – voice of "Nurse" on "Lost Keys (Blame Hofmann)"

=== Production ===
- Tool – production
- Joe Barresi – engineering, mixing (credited as "Evil Joe Barresi")
- Alex Grey – illustrations
- Adam Jones – art direction
- Bob Ludwig – mastering
- Mackie Osborne – design, layout
- Travis Shinn – photography

== Charts ==
=== Weekly charts ===
Weekly chart performance for 10,000 Days
Chart (2006)	Peak position
Australian Albums (ARIA)	1
Austrian Albums (Ö3 Austria)	1
Belgian Albums (Ultratop Flanders)	1
Belgian Albums (Ultratop Wallonia)	6
Canadian Albums (Billboard)	1
Czech Albums (ČNS IFPI)	23
Danish Albums (Hitlisten)	2
Dutch Albums (Album Top 100)	1
Finnish Albums (Suomen virallinen lista)	1
French Albums (SNEP)	7
German Albums (Offizielle Top 100)	2
Greek Albums (IFPI)	1
Hungarian Albums (MAHASZ)	10
Irish Albums (IRMA)	6
Irish Albums (IRMA)	6
Italian Albums (FIMI)	4
Japanese Albums (Oricon)	16
New Zealand Albums (RMNZ)	1
Norwegian Albums (VG-lista)	1
Polish Albums (ZPAV)	1
Portuguese Albums (AFP)	6
Scottish Albums (Official Charts)	4
Spanish Albums (Promusicae)	18
Swedish Albums (Sverigetopplistan)	2
Swiss Albums (Schweizer Hitparade)	3
UK Albums (Official Charts)	4
US Billboard 200	1
US Top Rock Albums (Billboard)	1

=== Year-end charts ===
Year-end chart performance for 10,000 Days
Chart (2006)	Position
Australian Albums (ARIA)	37
Belgian Albums (Ultratop Flanders)	20
Dutch Albums (Album Top 100)	78
German Albums (Offizielle Top 100)	74
New Zealand Albums (RMNZ)	11
US Billboard 200	31
US Top Rock Albums (Billboard)	5

== Certifications ==
Certifications and sales for 10,000 Days
Region	Certification	Certified units/sales
Australia (ARIA)	Platinum	70,000^{^}
Canada (Music Canada)	Platinum	100,000^{^}
Belgium (BRMA)	Gold	25,000^{*}
Germany (BVMI)	Gold	100,000^{‡}
Ireland (IRMA)	Gold	7,500^{^}
New Zealand (RMNZ)	2× Platinum	30,000^{^}
Poland (ZPAV)	Gold	10,000^{*}
United Kingdom (BPI)	Gold	100,000^{‡}
United States (RIAA)	2× Platinum	1,736,000
^{*} Sales figures based on certification alone.^{^} Shipments figures based on certification alone.^{‡} Sales+streaming figures based on certification alone.
