= Grammy Award for Best Hard Rock Performance =

Honor presented to recording artists for quality hard rock performances

- Awarded for: Quality performances in the hard rock genre
- Country: United States
- Presented by: National Academy of Recording Arts and Sciences
- First award: 1990
- Final award: 2011
- Website: grammy.com

The Grammy Award for Best Hard Rock Performance was an award presented to recording artists at the Grammy Awards from 1990 to 2011.

The academy recognized hard rock music artists for the first time at the 31st Grammy Awards in 1989. The category was originally presented as Best Hard Rock/Metal Performance Vocal or Instrumental, combining two of the most popular music genres of the 1980s. Jethro Tull won that award for the album Crest of a Knave, beating Metallica, who were expected to win with the album ...And Justice for All. This choice led to widespread criticism of the academy, as journalists suggested that the music of Jethro Tull did not belong in the hard rock or heavy metal genres. In response, the academy created the categories Best Hard Rock Performance and Best Metal Performance, separating the genres.

The band Living Colour was presented the first award for Best Hard Rock Performance in 1990. From 1992 to 1994, the award was presented as the Grammy Award for Best Hard Rock Performance with Vocal. The bands Foo Fighters, Living Colour, and the Smashing Pumpkins share the record for the most wins, with two each. American artists were presented with the award more than any other nationality, though it was also presented to musicians or groups originating from Australia twice and from the United Kingdom once. Alice in Chains holds the record for the most nominations without a win, with eight.

The award was discontinued in 2012 due to a major overhaul of Grammy categories. In 2012 and 2013, quality hard rock performances were honored in the Best Hard Rock/Metal Performance category. However, in 2014, the category was split, returning the stand-alone Best Metal Performance category and recognizing quality hard rock performances in the Best Rock Performance category. According to the Recording Academy, "It was determined that metal has a very distinctive sound, and hard rock more closely aligns with rock and can exist comfortably as one end of the rock spectrum."

== Recipients ==
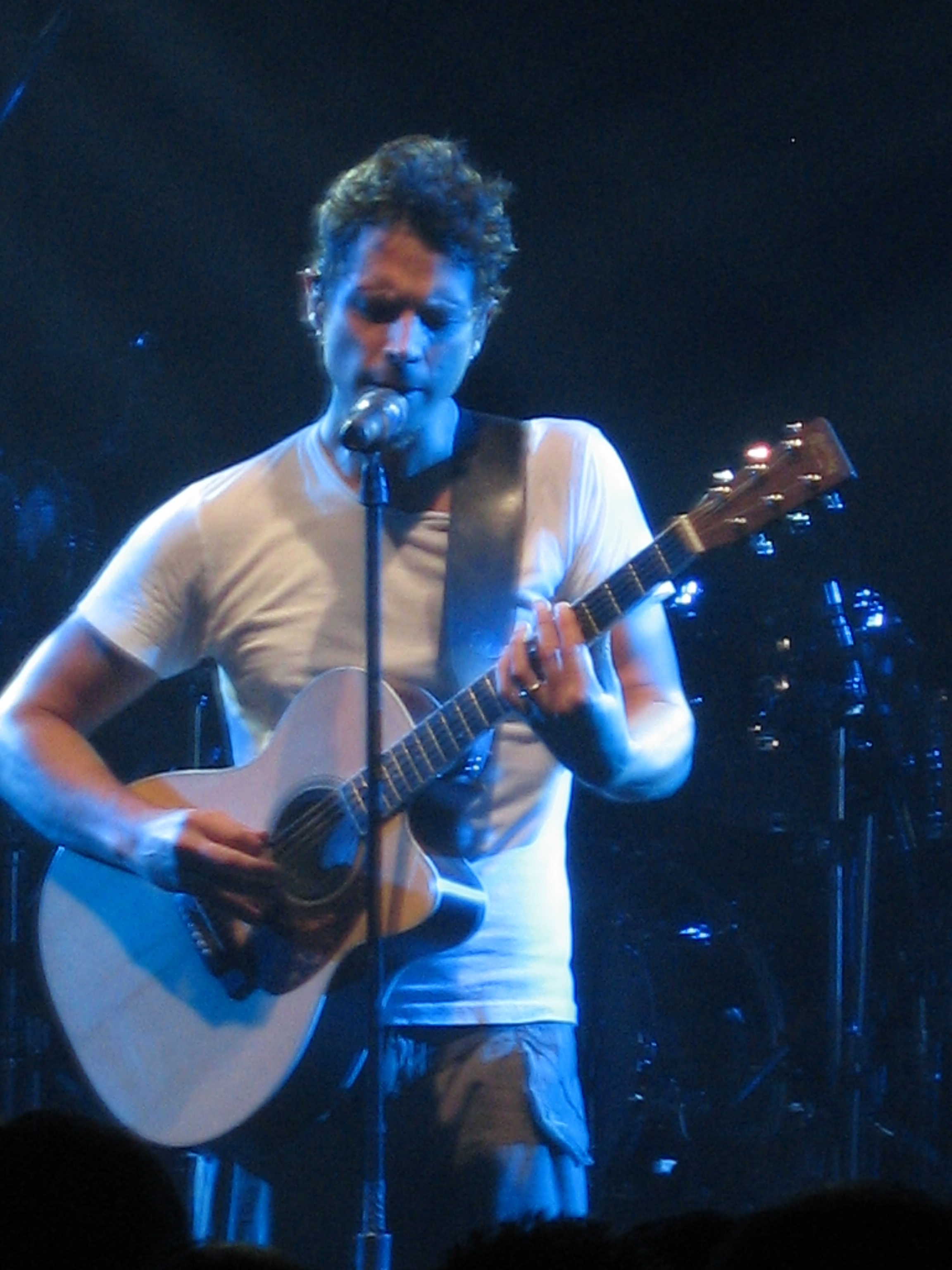
Chris Cornell, lead singer of the 1995 award-winning band Soundgarden, performing in 2005

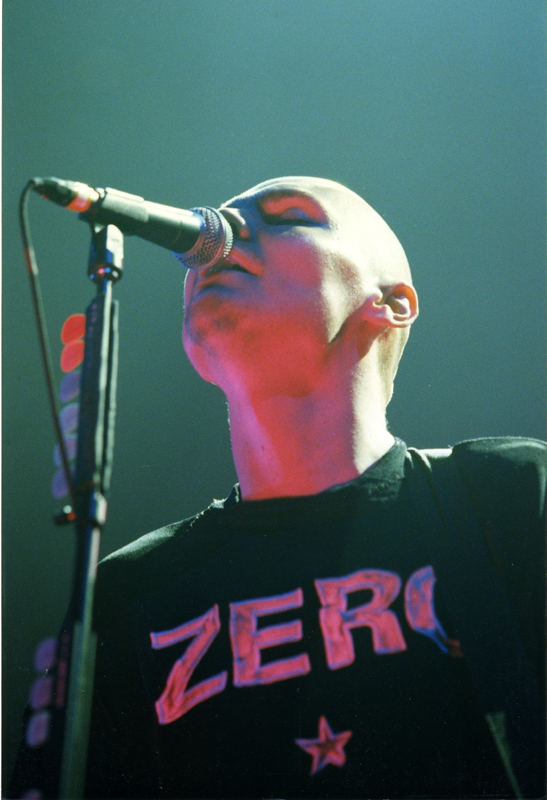
Billy Corgan of the two-time award-winning band The Smashing Pumpkins

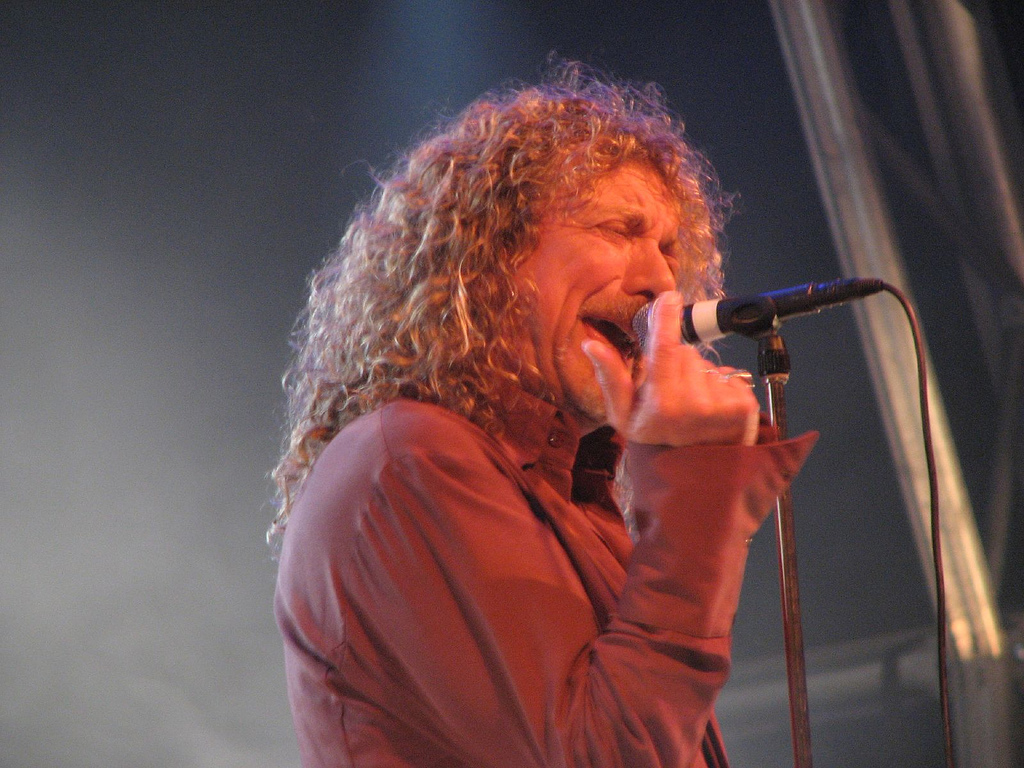
1999 award winner, Robert Plant, performing in 2007

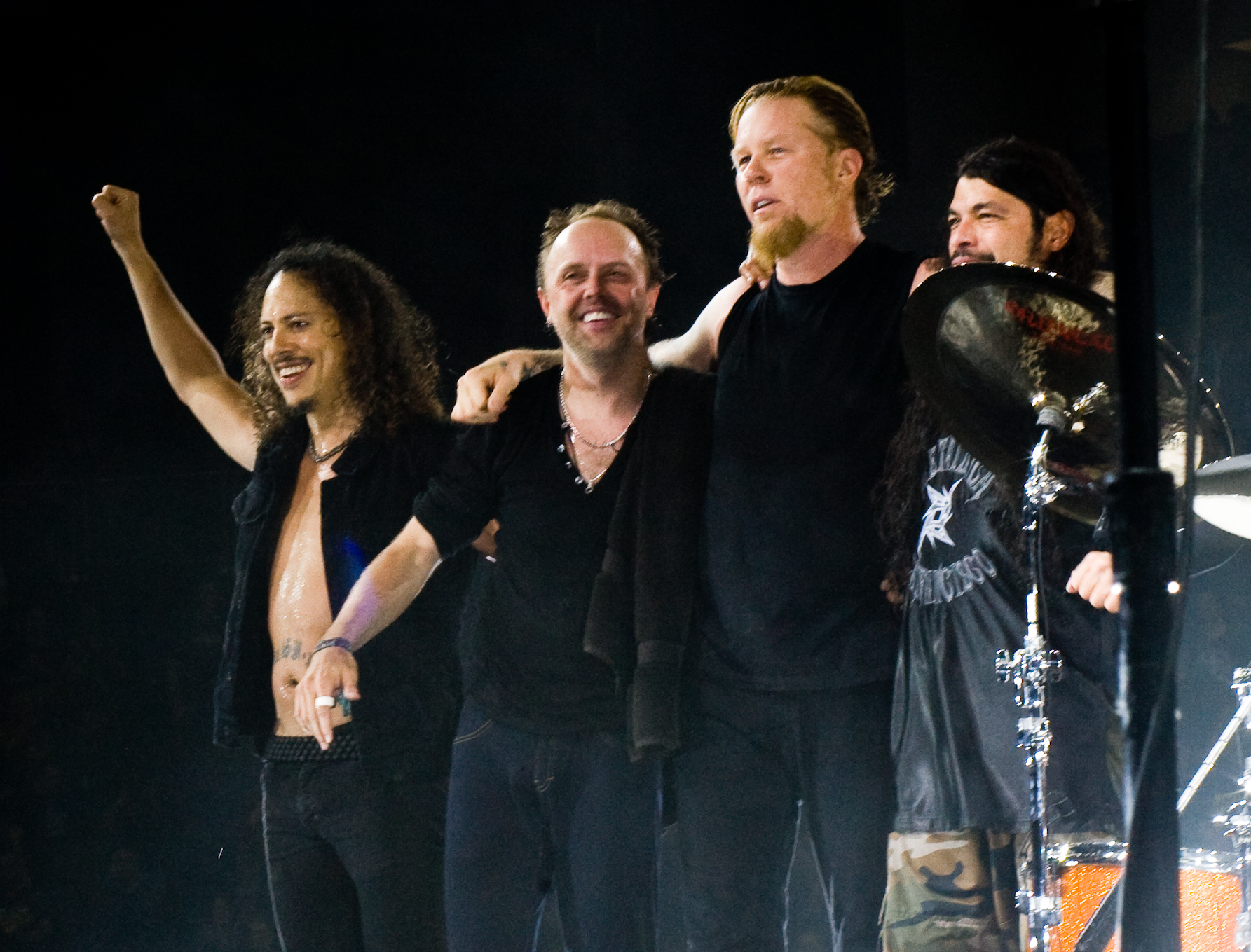
Metallica, the 2000 award-winning band, performing in 2008

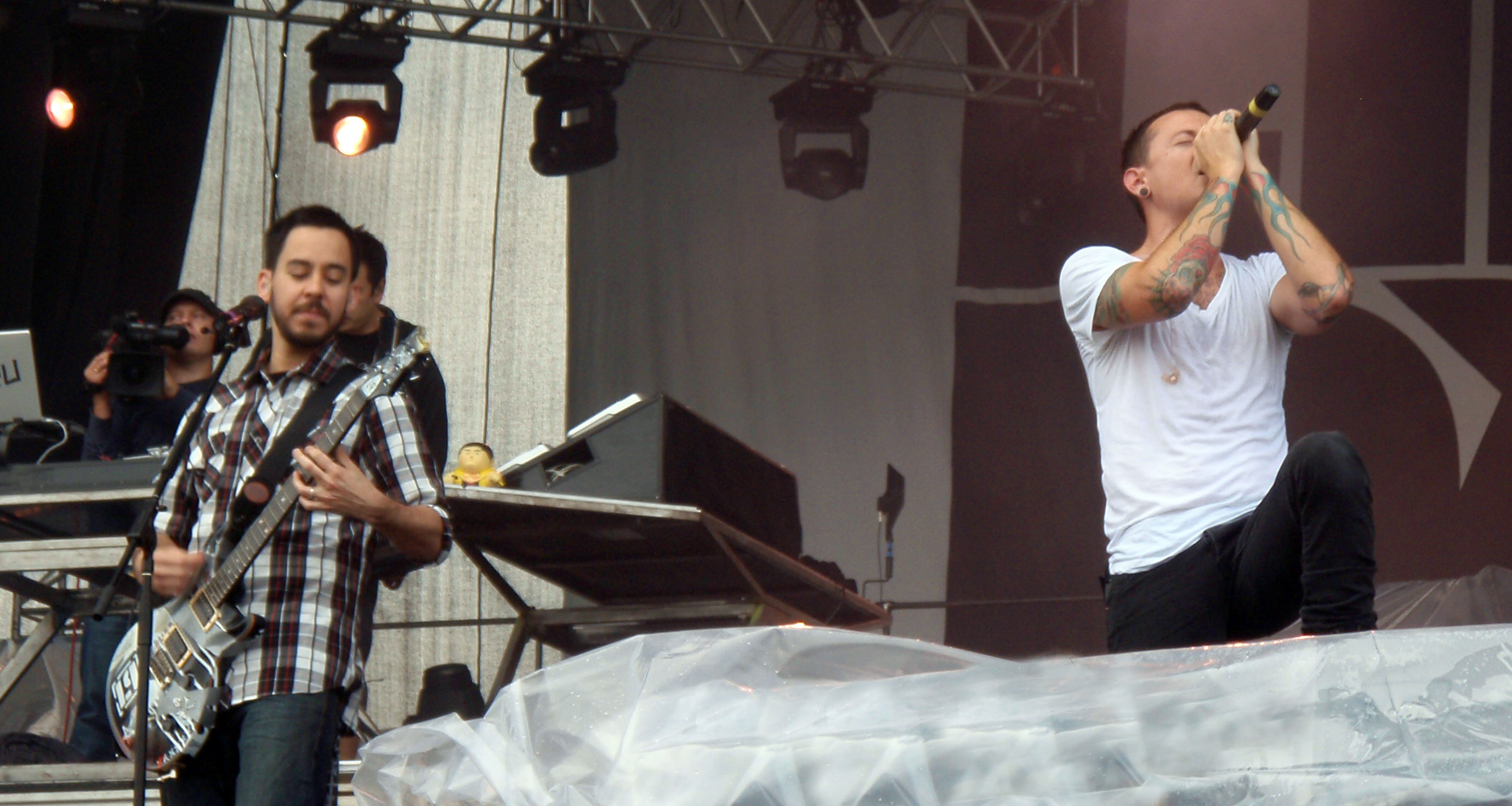
Linkin Park, the 2002 award-winning band

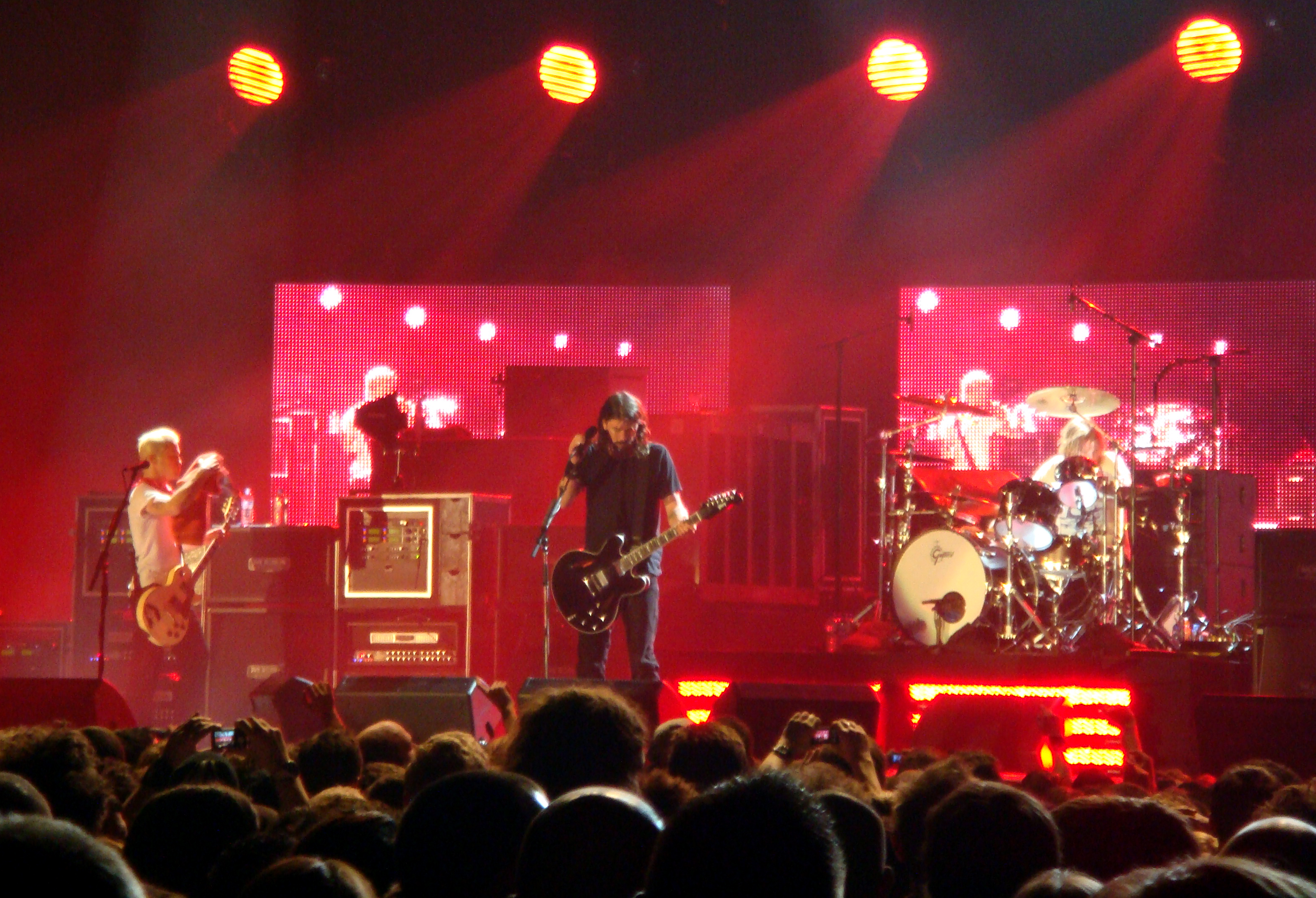
The two-time award-winning band Foo Fighters

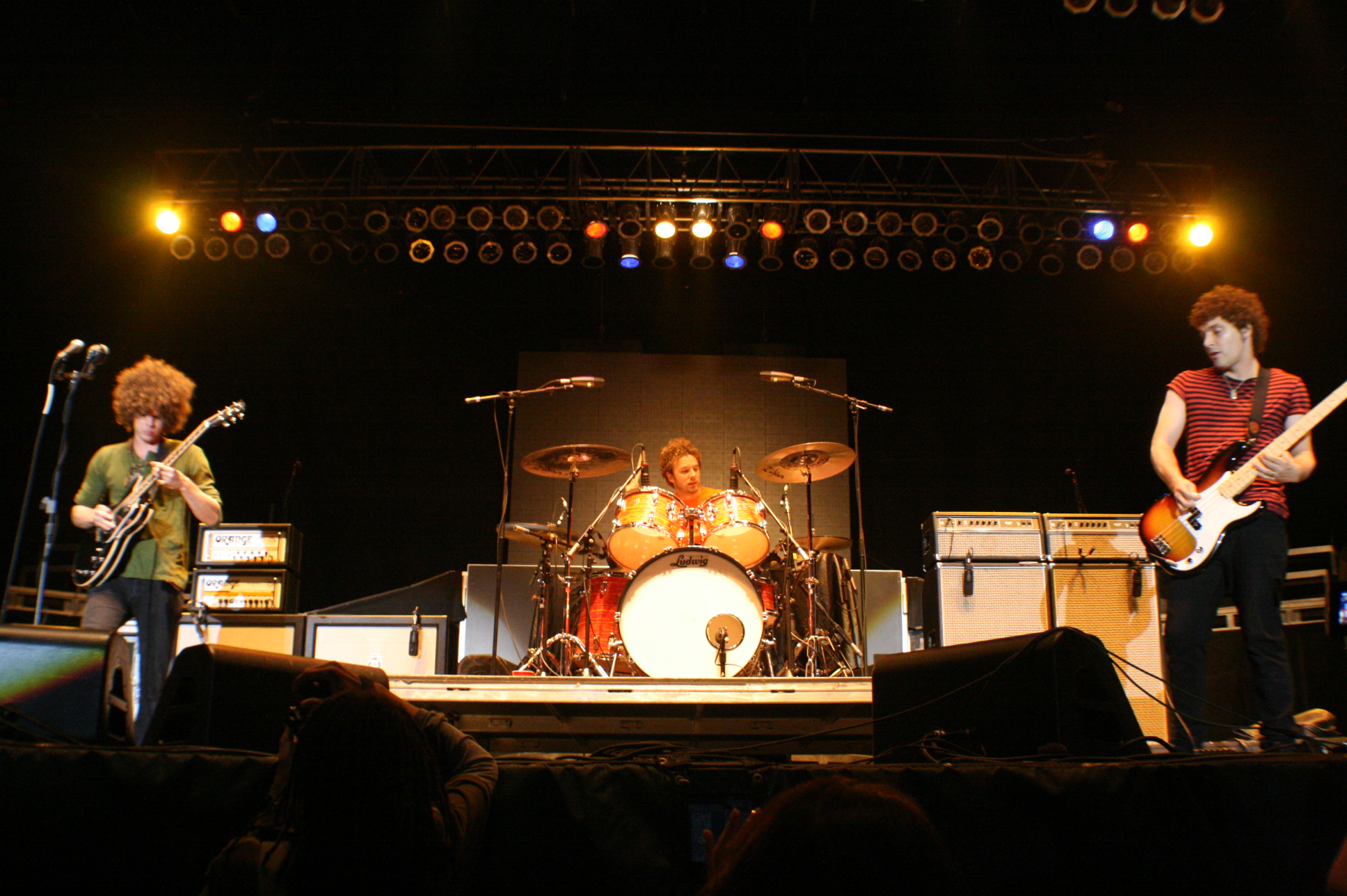
Wolfmother, the 2007 award-winning band, performing at the Beale Street Music Festival

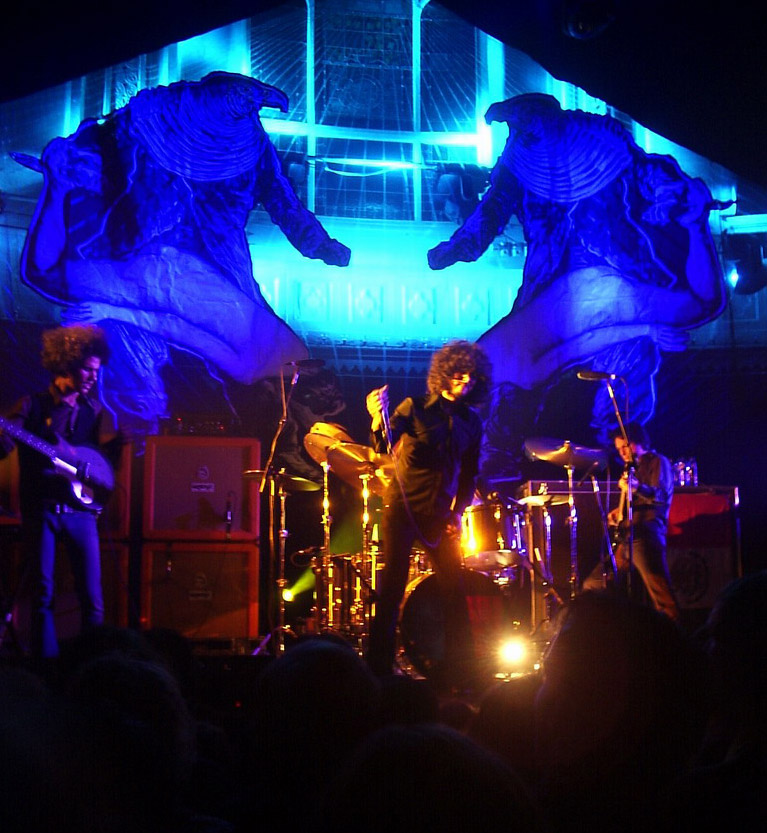
The 2009 award-winning band The Mars Volta

Year^{[I]}	Performing artist(s)	Work	Nominees	Ref.
1990	Living Colour	"Cult of Personality"	Aerosmith – "Love in an Elevator"; Great White – "Once Bitten, Twice Shy"; Guns N' Roses – G N' R Lies; Mötley Crüe – "Dr. Feelgood"	
1991	Living Colour	Time's Up	AC/DC – The Razors Edge; Faith No More – "Epic"; Jane's Addiction – Ritual de lo Habitual; Mötley Crüe – "Kickstart My Heart"	
1992	Van Halen	For Unlawful Carnal Knowledge	AC/DC – "Moneytalks"; Alice in Chains – "Man in the Box"; Guns N' Roses – Use Your Illusion I	
1993	Red Hot Chili Peppers	"Give It Away"	Alice in Chains – Dirt; Faith No More – Angel Dust; Guns N' Roses – "Live and Let Die"; Nirvana – "Smells Like Teen Spirit"; Pearl Jam – "Jeremy"	
1994	Stone Temple Pilots	"Plush"	AC/DC – "Highway to Hell" (live); Living Colour – "Leave It Alone"; Robert Plant – "Calling to You"; The Smashing Pumpkins – "Cherub Rock"	
1995	Soundgarden	"Black Hole Sun"	Alice in Chains – "I Stay Away"; Beastie Boys – "Sabotage"; Green Day – "Longview"; Pearl Jam – "Go"	
1996	Pearl Jam	"Spin the Black Circle"	Alice in Chains – "Grind"; Primus – "Wynona's Big Brown Beaver"; Red Hot Chili Peppers – "Blood Sugar Sex Magik" (live); Van Halen – "The Seventh Seal"	
1997	The Smashing Pumpkins	"Bullet with Butterfly Wings"	Alice in Chains – "Again"; Rage Against the Machine – "Bulls on Parade"; Soundgarden – "Pretty Noose"; Stone Temple Pilots – "Trippin' on a Hole in a Paper Heart"	
1998	The Smashing Pumpkins	"The End Is the Beginning Is the End"	Bush – "Swallowed"; Foo Fighters – "Monkey Wrench"; Nine Inch Nails – "The Perfect Drug"; Rage Against the Machine – "People of the Sun"	
1999	Page and Plant	"Most High"	Kiss – "Psycho Circus"; Marilyn Manson – "The Dope Show"; Metallica – "Fuel"; Pearl Jam – "Do the Evolution"	
2000	Metallica	"Whiskey in the Jar"	Alice in Chains – "Get Born Again"; Buckcherry – "Lit Up"; Kid Rock – "Bawitdaba"; Korn – "Freak on a Leash"; Limp Bizkit – "Nookie"	
2001	Rage Against the Machine	"Guerrilla Radio"	Kid Rock – "American Bad Ass"; Limp Bizkit – "Take a Look Around"; Pearl Jam – "Grievance"; Stone Temple Pilots – "Down"	
2002	Linkin Park	"Crawling"	Alien Ant Farm – "Smooth Criminal"; P.O.D. – "Alive"; Rage Against the Machine – "Renegades of Funk"; Saliva – "Your Disease"	
2003	Foo Fighters	"All My Life"	Godsmack – "I Stand Alone"; P.O.D. – "Youth of the Nation"; Queens of the Stone Age – "No One Knows"; System of a Down – "Aerials"	
2004	Evanescence & Paul McCoy	"Bring Me to Life"	Audioslave – "Like a Stone"; Godsmack – "Straight Out of Line"; Jane's Addiction – "Just Because"; Queens of the Stone Age – "Go with the Flow"	
2005	Velvet Revolver	"Slither"	Incubus – "Megalomaniac"; Metallica – "Some Kind of Monster"; Nickelback – "Feelin' Way Too Damn Good"; Slipknot – "Duality"	
2006	System of a Down	"B.Y.O.B."	Audioslave – "Doesn't Remind Me"; Nine Inch Nails – "The Hand That Feeds"; Robert Plant – "Tin Pan Valley"; Queens of the Stone Age – "Little Sister"	
2007	Wolfmother	"Woman"	Buckcherry – "Crazy Bitch"; Nine Inch Nails – "Every Day Is Exactly the Same"; System of a Down – "Lonely Day"; Tool – "Vicarious"	
2008	Foo Fighters	"The Pretender"	Evanescence – "Sweet Sacrifice"; Ozzy Osbourne – "I Don't Wanna Stop"; Queens of the Stone Age – "Sick, Sick, Sick"; Tool – "The Pot"	
2009	The Mars Volta	"Wax Simulacra"	Disturbed – "Inside the Fire"; Judas Priest – "Visions"; Mötley Crüe – "Saints of Los Angeles"; Rob Zombie – "The Lords of Salem"	
2010	AC/DC	"War Machine"	Alice in Chains – "Check My Brain"; Linkin Park – "What I've Done" (live); Metallica – "The Unforgiven III"; Nickelback – "Burn It to the Ground"	
2011	Them Crooked Vultures	"New Fang"	Alice in Chains – "A Looking in View"; Ozzy Osbourne – "Let Me Hear You Scream"; Soundgarden – "Black Rain"; Stone Temple Pilots – "Between the Lines"	

^{^[I]} Each year is linked to the article about the Grammy Awards held that year.

== Multiple wins ==
2 wins

- Foo Fighters
- Living Colour
- The Smashing Pumpkins

== Multiple nominations ==
8 nominations

- Alice in Chains

5 nominations

- Pearl Jam

4 nominations

- AC/DC
- Metallica
- Queens of the Stone Age
- Rage Against the Machine
- Stone Temple Pilots

3 nominations

- Foo Fighters
- Guns N' Roses
- Living Colour
- Mötley Crüe
- Nine Inch Nails
- The Smashing Pumpkins
- Soundgarden
- System of a Down

2 nominations

- Audioslave
- Buckcherry
- Evanescence
- Faith No More
- Godsmack
- Jane's Addiction
- Kid Rock
- Limp Bizkit
- Linkin Park
- Nickelback
- Ozzy Osbourne
- P.O.D.
- Robert Plant
- Red Hot Chili Peppers
- Tool
- Van Halen
