= Danny Carey =

American drummer (born 1961)

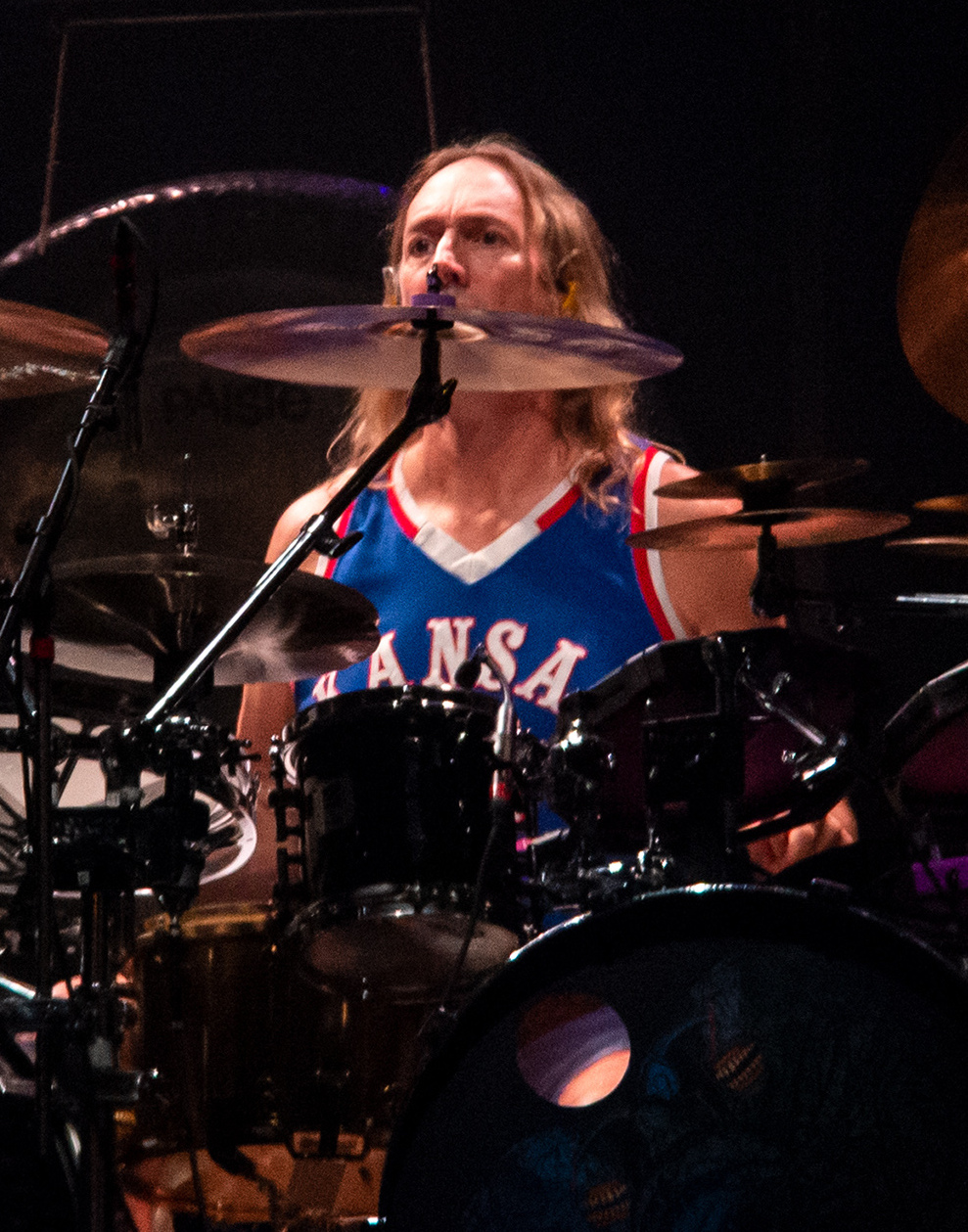
- Carey with Tool in 2019

Background information
- Born: Daniel Edwin Carey; May 10, 1961 (age 65); Lawrence, Kansas, U.S.
- Genres: Progressive metal; progressive rock; heavy metal; art rock; alternative metal; hard rock; jazz fusion; experimental rock
- Occupation: Musician
- Instrument: Drums
- Member of: Tool; Pigmy Love Circus; Volto!; Legend of the Seagullmen; Beat
- Formerly of: Zaum; Green Jellö; Pigface
- Website: dannycarey.com

Daniel Edwin Carey (born May 10, 1961) is an American drummer and member of the rock band Tool. He has contributed to albums by artists such as Zaum, Green Jellö, Pigface, Skinny Puppy, Adrian Belew, Carole King, Collide, Meat Puppets, Lusk, and Melvins. He has been named one of the greatest drummers by publications including Rolling Stone, Loudwire, MusicRadar.

== Biography ==
Born in Lawrence, Kansas, Carey's first encounter with the drums began at the age of ten when he joined the school band and began taking private lessons on the snare drum. Two years later, Carey began to practice on a drum set. In his senior year of high school in Paola, Kansas, Carey joined the high school jazz band. Carey also played basketball. Jazz would later play a huge role in his signature approach to the drum set in a rock setting. As Carey progressed through high school and later college at the University of Missouri–Kansas City, he began expanding his studies in percussion with theory into the principles of geometry, science, and metaphysics as well as delving into the occult. Carey also played jazz while attending college and got to experience the jazz scene in Kansas City.

After college, a friend and bandmate convinced Carey to leave Kansas for Portland, Oregon, where he played briefly in various bands before moving to Los Angeles, where he was able to perform as a studio drummer with Carole King and perform live sets with Pigmy Love Circus. During this period he played in a country band, the Wild Blue Yonder, with Jeff Buckley and John Humphrey. He also played in Green Jellö as "Danny Longlegs" and recorded the album Cereal Killer. He would later find his way to Tool after coming to know singer Maynard James Keenan and guitarist Adam Jones and practicing with them in place of drummers the two had requested but had never shown up. Besides Tool, Carey also finds time for other projects new and old such as Legend of the Seagullmen, Pigmy Love Circus, Volto!, and Zaum.

Carey was arrested at the Kansas City International Airport on December 12, 2021, after allegedly using a homophobic slur and repeatedly jabbing someone in the chest with two fingers. He was charged with a municipal assault violation. The charges were dropped in January 2023.

== Equipment ==
Carey uses the wood tip version of his own signature model of drumstick made by Vic Firth. He previously had endorsed a signature model with Trueline Drumsticks (now Trueline's Tribal Assault model). Carey also uses Sonor drums, Paiste cymbals, Evans drumheads, Hammerax, and electronic devices such as Mandala, Korg and Roland.

Paiste and Jeff Ocheltree (noted drum tech for artists including Billy Cobham, John Bonham and Lenny White) teamed up in the late 1990s to develop an entire drum set made out of recycled cymbals. The final products are melted down Paiste Signature bronze custom cast cymbals. Danny Carey used the kit during the Lateralus 2002 tour and during some drum clinics through the years.

Only three versions of this kit were ever created. Carey and Carl Palmer each own one, while the third resides at Paiste's Switzerland headquarters.

At the 2009 Winter NAMM Show, Sonor released a Danny Carey signature snare drum, which is a 1 mm thick bronze 14x8" snare with laser etched talisman symbols and his signature engraved around the vent hole.

In 2016, Paiste released a Danny Carey signature ride cymbal called "Dry Heavy Ride - Monad" based on their discontinued model that Carey always used since becoming a Paiste artist. The cymbal has a purple color and sigils printed on. It is named "Monad" because the main print is an esoteric glyph from John Dee.

During 2019, builder Alan Van Kleef from VK Drums was contacted by Carey to create a drum kit and a snare drum. After much debate Alan developed the set called "Monad", made by hand in Sheffield, England. Shortly after the completion of the Monad set, it was announced that a snare drum replica called "7empest" (after Tool's Grammy Award-winning song) would be made available as part of a limited collection of 33 individual pieces. At the same time that the 7empest snare was launched, Alan was also developing the first complete 7empest drum set. Like the snare, the 7empest drums is a Monad replica in almost every way, except for the engravings.

== Drumming techniques ==
Carey's popularity among drummers and non-drummers alike stems from the diversity of his sound and dynamics through his years of learning jazz music, his technical ability, frequent use of odd time signatures, polyrhythms, and polymeters. He has stated in interviews that he effectively treats his feet as he does his hands: he practices rudiments (used for sticking techniques) and even snare drum solos with his feet to improve his double bass drumming, hi-hat control, and foot independence.

In search of new techniques, Carey has studied tabla with Aloke Dutta, who can be heard playing on the live version of the song "Pushit" (from Salival). This is especially apparent on tracks such as "Disposition" (Lateralus) or "Right in Two" (10,000 Days), for which Carey has recorded the tabla parts himself in the studio. The tabla (and other percussive instruments) used in Tool's music are replicated live using the Mandala pads (in fact the pads are also used when recording in the studio, a notable example being the tabla solo of "Right in Two").

He has also stated that when he is playing to an odd time signature, he tries to drum to the "feel" of the song and establish general "inner pulse" for the given time signature instead of fully counting it out.

Carey also prominently uses a straight variation of the Swiss Army triplet rudiment, notably heard in tracks such as the intro of "The Grudge" (Lateralus), the breakdown of "Pneuma" (Fear Inoculum), as well as the solo in "Rosetta Stoned" (10,000 Days).

Carey has been featured in many drum and music magazines.

== Side projects and other musical endeavors ==
In his time away from Tool, Carey has contributed (and still regularly does) to a vast number of projects:

- Fusion band Volto!, which regularly plays shows in the Los Angeles area, consisting of both covers and original material
- Pigmy Love Circus, which has recorded several albums
- Electronica-oriented project Zaum
- Green Jellö
- Pigface
- Drums on the track "Use Less" from the album The Greater Wrong of the Right by Skinny Puppy
- Contributed to Adrian Belew's Side One and Side Three projects with bassist Les Claypool
- Drums on the track "The Harvest" from the album We speak Luniwaz: The Music of Joe Zawinul and drums on the album Near Life Experience, both by Scott Kinsey
- Drums on certain tracks of the Carole King album Colour of Your Dreams (as a session drummer) with Guns N' Roses guitarist Slash playing on select tracks
- Drums on the track "Somewhere" from the Collide album Some Kind of Strange and several tracks from Two Headed Monster
- Made an appearance on the 1997 album Free Mars by former Tool bassist Paul D'Amour's band Lusk
- Drums on the track "Bird's Eye", (2008, from the movie Body of Lies): Serj Tankian (System Of A Down, vocals), Mike Patton (Faith No More, vocals), Daron Malakian (guitar), Les Claypool (bass)
- Drums on the track "The Fourth" on the self-titled album from Feersum Ennjin, the band of former Tool Bassist Paul D'Amour
- Drums on the track "Misery" from Author & Punisher's 2022 album Krüller.
- Drums with psychedelic rock supergroup Legend of the Seagullmen along with Brent Hinds of Mastodon, Jimmy Hayward and others. Their eponymous debut album was released in February 2018, on Dine Alone Records
- He would work with Hayward on his second animated feature, Free Birds, voicing a character who shares his name.
- Drums on Forever Love's Fool, a 22-minute progressive rock track recorded with Canadian musician Daniel Romano
- Touring North America in 2024 with the supergroup "Beat" named after the King Crimson album, who are playing the music of 1980's King Crimson from this and other albums. The group consists of Carey, former King Crimson members Adrian Belew and Tony Levin, and Steve Vai.
- Playing with Primus on their opening slot for Tool in Punta Cana, Dominican Republic in March 2025 replacing former drummer Tim Alexander.
