= Adam Jones (musician) =

American musician & artist (born 1965)

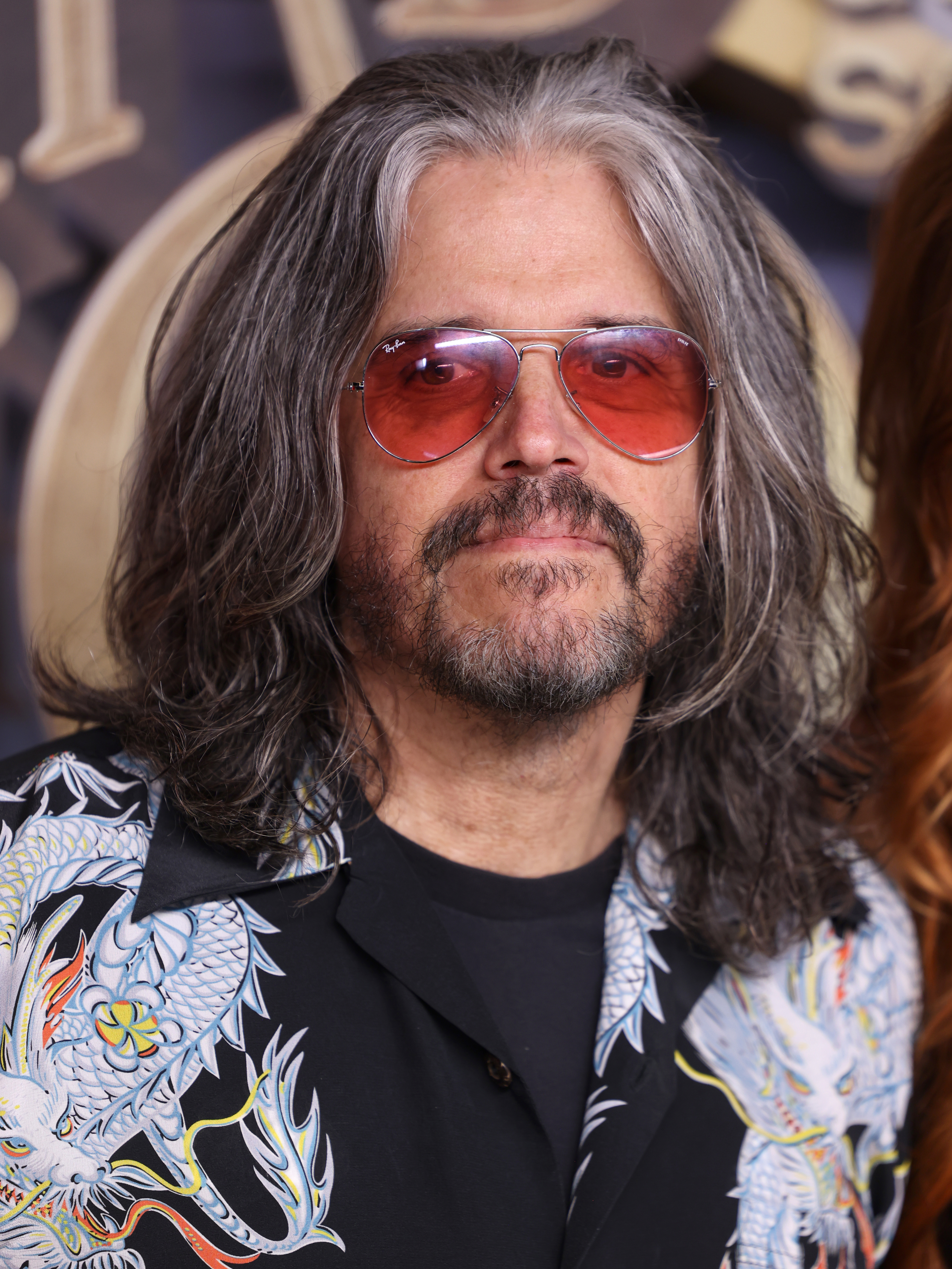
- Jones in 2025

Background information
- Born: Adam Thomas Jones; January 15, 1965 (age 61); Park Ridge, Illinois, U.S.
- Genres: Alternative metal; art rock; post-metal; progressive metal; progressive rock; garage rock; heavy metal
- Occupations: Musician; songwriter; visual artist; music video director
- Instruments: Guitar; bass guitar; upright bass; violin; sitar; talkbox; synthesizers
- Years active: 1984–present
- Labels: Volcano; Zoo
- Member of: Tool
- Formerly of: Electric Sheep
- Spouse: Korin Faught (m. 2013)

Adam Thomas Jones (born January 15, 1965) is an American musician, songwriter, visual artist, and music video director, best known as the guitarist of Tool. Jones has been rated the 75th-greatest guitarist of all time by the Rolling Stone and placed ninth in Guitar World's Top 100 Greatest Metal Guitarists. With experience in special effects and set design in the Hollywood film industry, Jones is also the director of the majority of Tool's music videos.

== Early years and personal life ==
Jones was born in Park Ridge, Illinois, and raised in Libertyville, Illinois. He was accepted into the Suzuki program, and continued to play violin through his freshman year in high school. As a child, he had an interest in animation, turning his ideas into three-dimensional sculptures, which explains why Tool's music videos often had 3D clay effects. He later began to play the double bass in an orchestra.

In addition to playing classical music, Jones played bass guitar in the band Electric Sheep, with future Rage Against the Machine member Tom Morello playing guitar, until Jones moved to California (Morello soon followed). According to both of them, the band was quite unpopular at the time. Jones never received traditional guitar lessons, but he and Morello learned from each other.

On July 6, 2013, Jones married painter Korin Faught. They have two sons and a daughter.

== Career ==
=== Film work ===
Jones was offered a film scholarship but declined and chose to move to Los Angeles to study art and sculpture. His interest shifted to film, and he began to work as a sculptor and special effects designer, where he learned the stop motion camera techniques he would later apply in Tool's music videos, such as "Sober", "Prison Sex", "Stinkfist", "Ænema", "Schism", and "Parabola". He graduated in 1987.

After graduation, he went to work at Rick Lazzarini's Character Shop. During the next two years, he worked on the TV show Monsters. He designed and fabricated a Grim Reaper makeup and a zombie head on a spike (later used in Ghostbusters II) among others. After that, he went to Stan Winston's special effects workshop, where he worked on Predator 2, sculpting a unique-looking skull for the Predator's spaceship interior.

Jones worked on several other films in Hollywood doing makeup and set design, including Jurassic Park, Batman Returns, Terminator 2: Judgment Day, Dances with Wolves, and Ghostbusters II. He did the "Freddy Krueger in the womb" makeup for A Nightmare on Elm Street 5: The Dream Child, as well as work for A Nightmare on Elm Street 4: The Dream Master.

He also worked on commercials for salad dressing (never aired), Olympic Paints & Stains (Albert Einstein makeup), and Duracell (boxers and taxicabs).

=== Music career ===
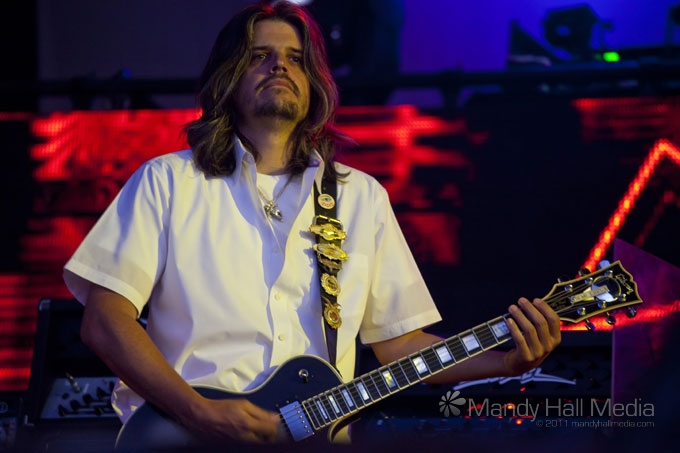
Jones performing with Tool in 2011

Jones also toured with Jello Biafra/The Melvins and contributed to their albums Never Breathe What You Can't See and Sieg Howdy!. Jones and Melvins guitarist/vocalist Buzz Osborne are close friends. Jones also appeared on the Melvins album Hostile Ambient Takeover, the live album Colossus of Destiny, the Melvins/Lustmord collaboration Pigs of the Roman Empire and the Isis album Wavering Radiant.

On Mr. Show, he appeared as the fictional guitarist of Puscifer along with bandmate Keenan, and can also be spotted in the audience seated at a table with Keenan in the series' first episode.

On August 14, 2011, Jones performed the national anthem of the United States at the outset of WWE's SummerSlam wrestling event in Los Angeles.

In 2025, WWE announced that Jones provided the guitar parts for The Lucha Brothers' entrance themes.

==== Playing style ====
Adam Jones is known for not predominantly using any particular guitar playing technique, but rather combining many techniques such as "alternately utilizing power chords, scratchy noise, chiming arpeggios, off-beat rhythm patterns, and a quiet minimalism". On the 2019 release, Fear Inoculum, Jones used drop D tuning almost exclusively. He has used other tunings outside of drop D in songs like "Parabola" and "Prison Sex". In the song "7empest", Jones uses a 7/8 time signature throughout the intro of the song. On Lateralus and 10,000 Days, he made heavy use of triplets. Other techniques used to expand his band's sound repertoire require forms of instrumental experimentation and applications of non-instrumental experimentation as well, such as his use of an epilator as a plectrum on the Ænima and Lateralus albums for example; continuing in this direction on the Tool song, "Jambi", Jones uses a talk box. In the song "Third Eye", he makes use of a pick slide for the opening. Live, Jones can be seen with a large pedalboard of effects, including a DOD FX-40B Equalizer (EQ) pedal, Boss BF-2 Flanger, Boss DD-3 Digital Delay, a Dunlop Cry Baby, and a MXR Micro Amp, among others. In a 1994 interview, he mentioned the band Helmet as an influence. Jones is most often seen using his prized 1979 Custom Silverburst Gibson Les Paul, which would later be sold as a signature model for Jones by Gibson in 2020. He uses multiple amplifiers live and when recording, mainly consisting of Marshall, Diezel, and Mesa Boogie amps.

=== Visual art ===
Jones created the cover and inside liner art for many of Tool's albums and also the re-release of Peach's Giving Birth to a Stone, on which Jones's fellow Tool bandmate Justin Chancellor played bass.

He helped the band Green Jellÿ with their stage personas & clothing designs.

In 2007, he received the Grammy Award for Best Recording Package as art director for his work on 10,000 Days.

Jones came up with the makeup the actors wore on the videos for "Schism" and "Parabol/Parabola".

In his spare time, Jones shoots photography that is used for the visuals at live Tool concerts. The blending of photos and art appear on many large monitors in concert venues as well as a background for the band. The images are set in order to appear with specific songs on the set list.

Jones draws his own comics, an artistic ability he developed as a young child. An X-Files/30 Days of Night crossover in 2010 was co-written by Jones and 30 Days creator Steve Niles with artwork by Tom Mandrake.

Jones did the artwork for the albums Ramagehead (2019) and Screamnasium (2022) of the international band O.R.k.
