= Justin Chancellor =

British musician (born 1971 (age 55)

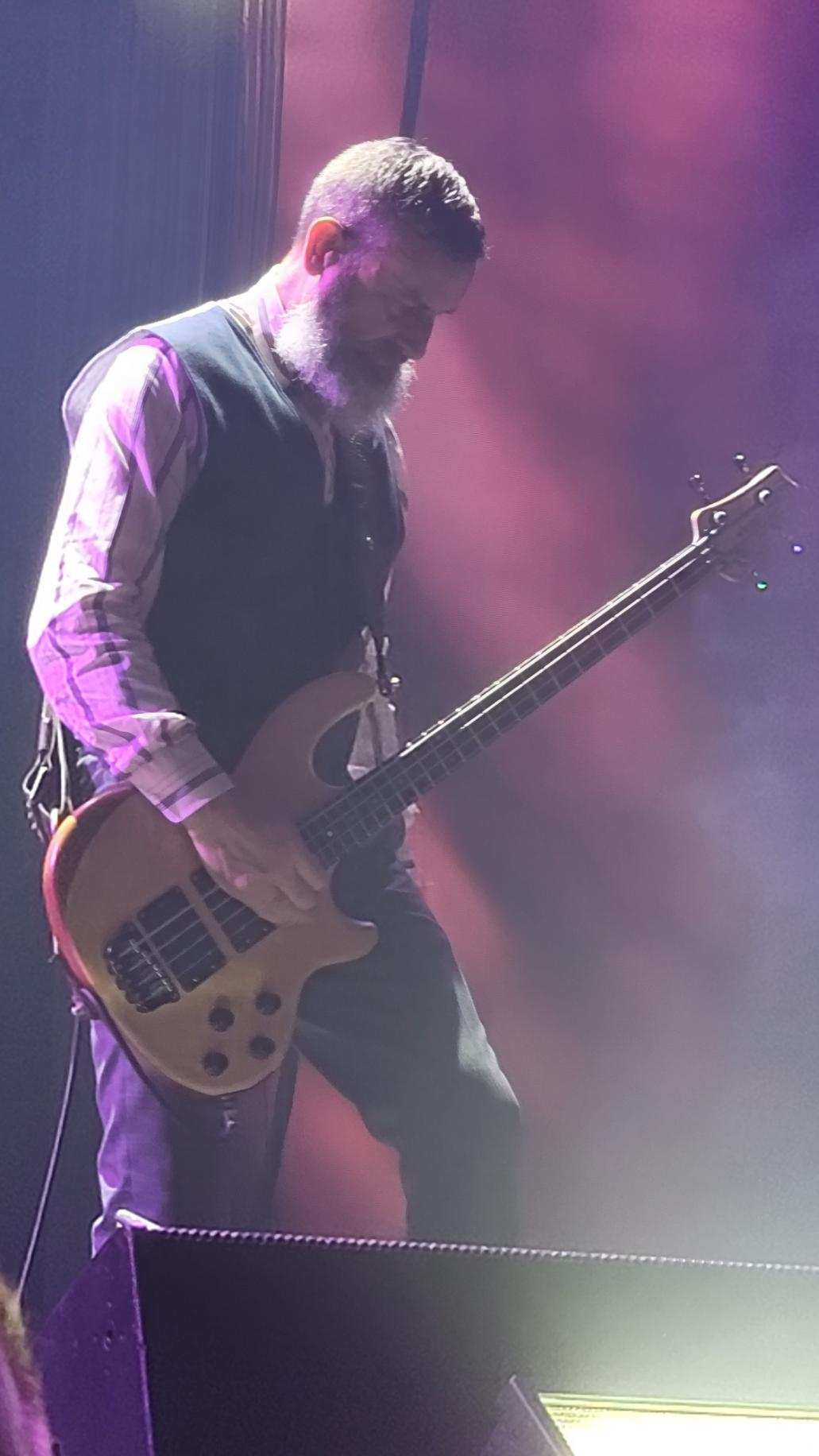
- Chancellor performing with Tool in 2022

Background information
- Born: Justin Gunnar Walter Chancellor; 19 November 1971 (age 55); London, England
- Genres: Alternative metal; art rock; post-metal; progressive metal; progressive rock
- Occupations: Musician; book and record store owner
- Instruments: Bass guitar; guitar
- Years active: 1991–present
- Member of: Tool; MTVoid
- Formerly of: Peach

Justin Gunnar Walter Chancellor (born 19 November 1971) is an English musician, best known as the bassist for rock band Tool, a position he has held since 1995. Prior to joining Tool, he played in a band called Peach. After settling in the US, along with his engagement in his musical projects, he and his wife Shelee Dykman Chancellor ran a store called Lobal Orning in Topanga, California, dedicated to music and literature "that shaped and changed" both of them. The store closed in 2008. He started the M.T.Void music project with Piotr "Glaca" Mohammed from Sweet Noise.

== Early life ==
Chancellor is of English and Norwegian descent. He was educated at Tonbridge School in Kent, England, where he was the bass player for a school band named Slice of Life and used to perform a cover version of Corey Hart's "Sunglasses at Night" in the dining room of his boarding house. The band released an eponymous titled tape featuring a song of the same name. Chancellor went on to study at Durham University.

== Career ==
Chancellor later joined the band Peach. Peach released the album Giving Birth to a Stone and two EPs, and supported Tool in 1994 in Europe before breaking up in 1995. In September that year, Chancellor moved to the United States and joined Tool full-time to replace Paul D'Amour who departed during the recording of the band's second full-length album. Chancellor has been a full member of the band since the 1996 studio album Ænima.

== Equipment ==
=== Bass guitars ===
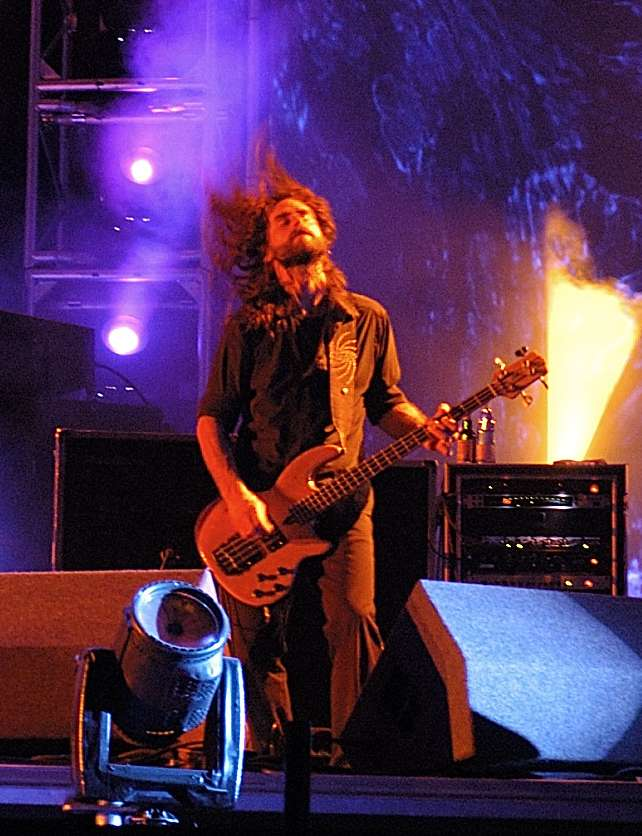
Chancellor appearing with Tool at the Roskilde festival in 2006

- Wal – Chancellor's main bass guitar is a Wal MKII 4-string he bought on a friend's recommendation during the recording of Ænima. Chancellor also has three other four-string Wals. He normally plays Ernie Ball Hybrid Slinky strings (.045, .065, .085, .110)
- Music Man Stingray – Used on "Forty-Six & 2", "H.", "Pushit", "No Quarter" and "Descending". Justin has used a Stingray live on "Descending" since 2020.
- Gibson Thunderbird – Used once for "Prison Sex" live in 1995/1996, when he first joined the band.
- Warwick Streamer - As of 2017, Chancellor has his own custom shop Streamer Stage II bass.

=== Amplification ===
- Gallien-Krueger 2001RB head x3 (1 Dirty, 1 Clean, 1 Spare)
- Mesa Boogie Roadready 4x12 (For Dirty)
- Mesa Boogie Roadready 8x10 (For Clean)
- Demeter Amplification VTBP-201S Bass Preamp running direct to PA

Formerly used

- Mesa Boogie M-2000 head
- Mesa Boogie M-Pulse
- Mesa Boogie Bass 400+
- Mesa Roadready 8x10 (in place of the 4x12)

=== Effects ===
- Boss TU-2
- Guyatone VTX Tremolo
- DigiTech Bass Whammy – Used on "Eulogy" (fifth up/sixth up harmony), "Pushit (Live)" (fifth up/octave up harmony), "Third Eye" (octave up), "Schism" (octave up), "Ticks and Leeches" (fifth up/octave up harmony), "Lateralus" (octave up), "Disposition" (fifth up/octave up harmony), "Vicarious" (octave up harmony), "The Pot" (octave up), "Right in Two"(fifth up/sixth up harmony), and "Invincible" (octave up).
- Tech 21 SansAmp GT2 Distortion
- Boss CE-5 Chorus Ensemble
- Boss BF-2 Flanger
- Boss DD-3 Digital Delay
- MXR Bass Envelope Filter
- Prescription Electronics Rx Overdriver
- Colorsound Tone Bender Fuzz
- Foxx Fuzz/Wah/Volume-Volume Pot Removed
- Dunlop Justin Chancellor Cry Baby Wah

== Discography ==
=== With Peach ===
- Giving Birth to a Stone (1994)

=== With Tool ===
- Ænima (1996)
- Lateralus (2001)
- 10,000 Days (2006)
- Fear Inoculum (2019)

=== With MTVoid ===
- Nothing's Matter (2013)
- Matter's Knot, Pt. 1 (2023)

== Guest appearances ==
- Chancellor played bass on the Isis song "Altered Course" on their 2004 album Panopticon. Chancellor also provided additional sounds/bass guitar on the Isis song "Weight" from their 2006 live Clearing the Eye [DVD]
- Additional bass on the title track of Intronaut's 2010 album Valley of Smoke.
- In October 2012, Chancellor featured as bass player on the song "In the Spirit Of..." on a The Fusion Syndicate album, released by Cleopatra Records. His track also appears on the 2014 album The Prog Box.
- Chancellor narrated on the Primus track "The Valley" from their 2017 album The Desaturating Seven.
- In May 2018, Chancellor collaborated with Death Grips in the album Year of the Snitch, providing bass on the track "Disappointed".
- Chancellor played bass on Author & Punisher's album 2022 Krüller, on the track "Centurion".
- Chancellor and drummer Aric Improta of Night Verses collaborated on a 2021 track called "Exu".
- Chancellor played bass on Night Verses's 2023 album Every Sound Has a Color in the Valley of Night: Part 1, on the track "Séance".
- Chancellor played bass on Adam Jones's 2020 single "The Witness"
