= Kokopelli (disambiguation) =

Kokopelli is a Native American fertility deity.

Kokopelli may also refer to:

- Kokopelli Records, a record label created by jazz musician Herbie Mann
- Kokopelli (album), a 2003 album by the band Kosheen
- "Kokopelli", a song by Mild High Club from the album Skiptracing
- Kokopelli Trail, a trail in Colorado and Utah
- Kokopelli Winery, Arizona
- Association Kokopelli, a non-profit organization based in France involved in the protection of biodiversity, medicinal plants and the production of organic seeds
  - Kokopelli Seed Foundation, a North American organization involved in providing access to open-pollinated seeds
- Kokopelli, a major character in the Bokurano manga and anime
- Kokopelli, a cartoon character who appeared in early additions of Muse Magazine.

== See also ==
- Kokopeli Digital Studios, a brand of American video game publisher THQ
