= Page Springs Cellars =

Winery in Arizona

- Location: Cornville, AZ US
- Wine region: Verde Valley
- Founded: 2003
- First vintage: 2003
- Key people: Eric Glomski, Founder and Director of Winegrowing
- Distribution: Tasting Room, Wine Club and regionally
- Tasting: Open to the public, 365 days a year
- Website: http://www.pagespringscellars.com

Page Springs Cellars & Vineyards is a family-owned Arizona winery and vineyard tucked into the volcanic landscape overlooking pristine Oak Creek Canyon, just 15 minutes south of Sedona in the Verde Valley. Page Springs Cellars produces Rhone style wines, working primarily with Syrah, Petite Sirah, Grenache and Mourvedre.

== History ==
Page Springs Cellars was founded in 2003 by Eric Glomski. Born in Illinois and raised in Boston, Glomski moved west to study ecology at Prescott College. Upon graduating from Prescott College, Glomski founded a River Restoration Company. It was here that he began his foray into the winemaking business after teaching himself to make wine from heirloom apples, pears, peaches and quince from abandoned homesteads that he came across during his field journeys. In the mid 90s, Eric continued his wine education by moving to California and working at David Bruce, rising from cellar worker to Co-Winemaker and Director of Production over a six-year span.

In 2003, he returned to Arizona and worked as a winemaker at Echo Canyon Vineyards & Winery before founding his own label, Page Springs Cellars, and later Arizona Stronghold Vineyards, with Maynard James Keenan in 2007.

In a statement on the Page Springs Website, Glomski said:

We have a wine centered philosophy. The market is not driving our winemaking, quality is. My wines are an expression of the place that I call home.

— Page Springs Cellars official website.

Called a “pioneer” in the Verde Valley region and the “area’s best known vintner” by Wine Enthusiast, Glomski has been pivotal to the growth of the Verde Valley Wine Industry. According to Master Sommelier and certified wine educator, Laura Williamson, “the amount of energy he has spent eradicating doubts that Arizona could produce high-quality wines has been infinite.”

In 2006 when out-of-state distributors introduced a bill that would have prevented small Arizona wineries from selling their products directly to consumers and retailers, Glomski, along with Rod Keeling (Owner of Keeling Schaefer Vineyards) and Phoenix water law attorney Robert Lynch, spearheaded pro-winery legislation and personally lobbied state politicians. Glomski's efforts benefited the Arizona wine industry as a whole and since this victory the number of federally bonded wineries in Arizona has more than tripled.

== Arizona Wine Industry ==
Although Spanish Missionaries begun producing wine in Arizona during the 16th century for use in Christian religious ceremonies, modern winemaking started in 1970's in the Sonoita AVA. Today there are over 45 licensed and bonded wineries throughout Arizona.

Despite the prejudices and objections of many, Arizona is quickly becoming known as a serious wine destination. The state's first viticulture program, started at Yavapai College in January 2011. Another catalyst in the Verde Valley area is the Verde Valley Wine Consortium, a nonprofit organization spearheading the advancement of tourism, economic development and education created by the local wine industry.

== Blood Into Wine ==
Eric Glomski, starred alongside Maynard James Keenan in the 2009 documentary, Blood into Wine showcasing their efforts of bringing credibility and notoriety to Arizona winemaking while battling wine industry prejudice and harsh desert conditions. The movie was released theatrically in March 2010 and on DVD and Blu-ray in September 2010. Blood Into Wine was awarded the Best Feature Documentary at the 2011 Trail Dance Film Festival in Oklahoma.
