= Caduceus Cellars =

Winery in Jerome, Arizona, US

Coordinates: 34°44′39.3″N 111°53′21.3″W

- Location: Jerome, Arizona, US
- Founded: 2004
- Key people: Maynard James Keenan
- Other products: Apparel
- Distribution: National; limited online sales
- Tasting: Open to public
- Website: www.caduceus.org

Caduceus Cellars is a winery in Jerome, Arizona, United States. It is owned by Maynard James Keenan, who is best known as the vocalist for Grammy Award-winning rock band Tool. While the winery is named after the caduceus, an ancient symbol for commerce and staff of the Greek god Hermes, the vineyard is named Merkin Vineyards, after a pubic wig (merkin).

== History ==
Viticulture in Arizona began in the 18th century when missionary Spanish Jesuit priests began to plant grapevines and make wine for use in Christian religious ceremonies. Unlike most vineyards in Arizona, which are located in the southeastern portion of the state near Tucson, Caduceus Cellars and Merkin Vineyards are based in the unincorporated area of Page Springs/Cornville, Arizona, southwest of Keenan's place of residence, as well as the cellar where wine tasting is available, in Jerome (which is open 365 days a year). Keenan has characterized the neighbors of the winery as "a teetotaling Republican community".

This is a prime spot for vineyards. An untapped resource. But the master plan is to have the Merkin Vineyards Bed and Breakfast set up for when California drops in the ocean. Beach front property and the New Napa Valley. You got it.

— Keenan in interview with IGN.com, September 13, 2006.

== Wines ==
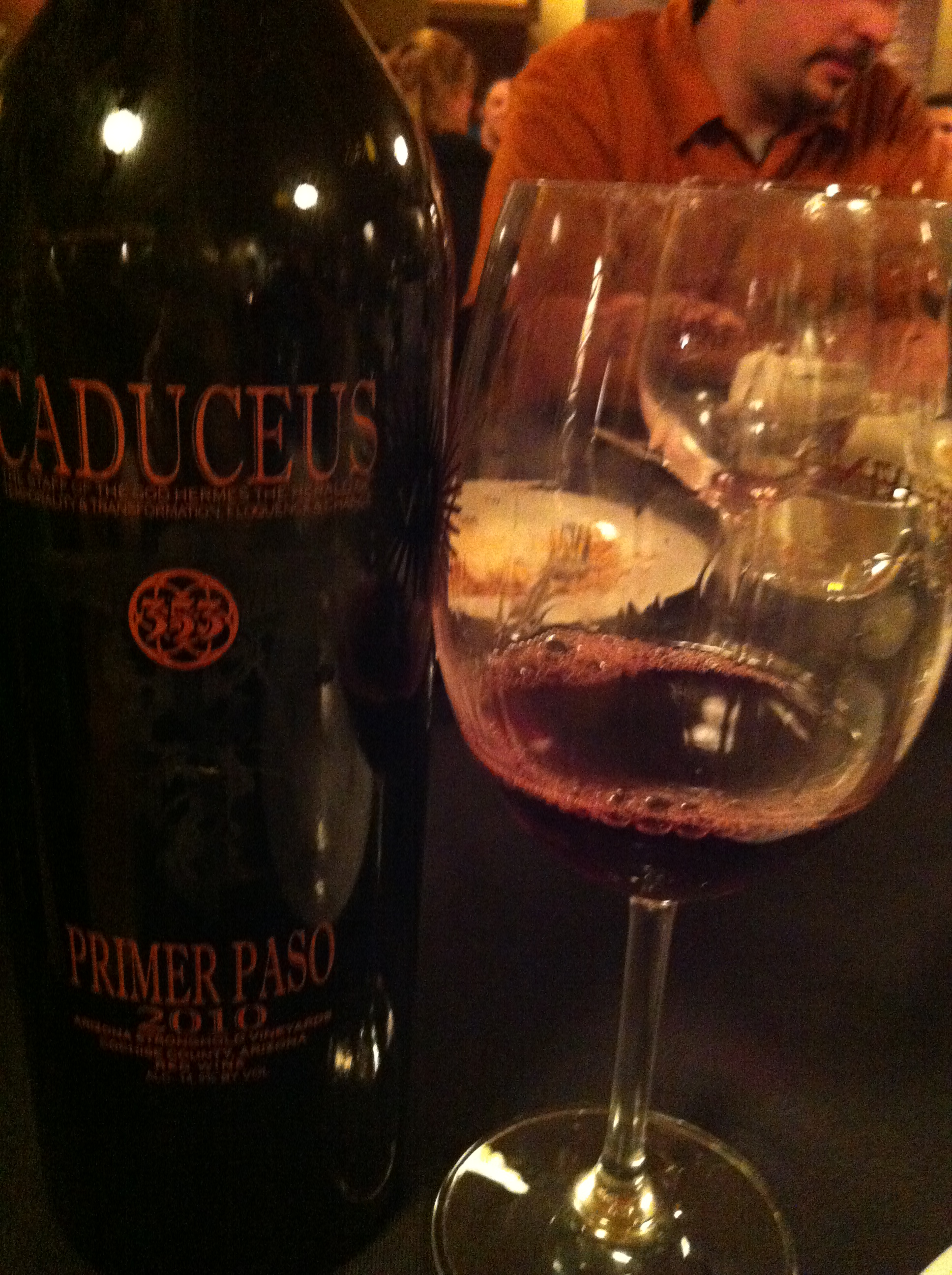
A Primer Paso from Caduceus

Caduceus's first wine, the limited edition Primer Paso (2005, 2006, 2007), sold out, and was followed by a Nagual de la Naga (2004, 2005, 2006) and a Nagual del Sensei (2004, 2005). Later wines include the Nagual de la Naga (2004, 2005, 2006), Merkin Vineyards Chupacabra (2005, 2006), Merkin Vineyards Shinola (2006), Nagual del Judith (2007), and Sancha (2007).

Keenan's mother died in 2003, at the age of 59, due to complications from a brain aneurysm. Following her death, he scattered her ashes across one of his vineyards, later honoring her memory with his Cabernet Sauvignon "Nagual del Judith", the first made entirely with grapes from Merkin Vineyards. In a statement released in April 2009, Keenan stated:

I am standing on a metaphorical plateau. The view from here suggests that I/we still have many mountains to negotiate. It has already been a long journey. But the successes and failures have been in balance. Which would suggest that I/we have chosen the correct path. I hold in my hands the evidence to support this statement ... With tears in my eyes, I present to you the very first 100 percent Arizona Caduceus wine. Nagual del Judith, named after my late mother, Judith Marie, whose ashes are spread across this Northern Arizona vineyard. These vines and wines are her resurrection and her wings.

— Caduceus Cellars official website.

Previous wines were named after relatives of the Chiricahua Apache chief Cochise who lived in the area where the vineyard is located, and were produced at Page Springs Cellars, owned by Keenan's business partner.

== Promotion ==
Keenan, a musician with the rock bands Tool, A Perfect Circle and Puscifer, began scheduling all records, promoting and touring around the winery's most important weeks shortly after its establishment. Keenan remarked, "These guys know that I've gotta be in Arizona for the harvesting and processing, and then I'll need to be back there again for the bottling. We'll be working our touring schedule around it." During the fall of 2008, Keenan began a small promotional tour with Eric Glomski, promoting the wine with signing sessions at Whole Foods Markets in California, Arizona and Nevada. The tour continued in 2009 with sessions in Texas kicking off in March, and appearances scheduled during Tool's 2009 summer tour in Florida, Massachusetts, and New Jersey.

Keenan also carries a bottle of Caduceus wine during the 2008 "Momma Sed" music video for Puscifer.

== Documentary ==
Blood Into Wine is a documentary about Keenan and Glomski's embarkation into winemaking in the desert conditions of Arizona's Verde Valley, and the success they've seen in the decade since its inception. The trailer, co-produced by Moog filmmakers Ryan Page and Christopher Pomerenke, was released on the web on June 11, 2009, on twinklecashcompany.com. The movie was released in March 2010 theatrically and on DVD and Blu-ray in September 2010.

== See also ==
- List of celebrities who own wineries and vineyards
