= Arizona wine =

Wine made from grapes grown in Arizona, United States

Arizona
- Wine region
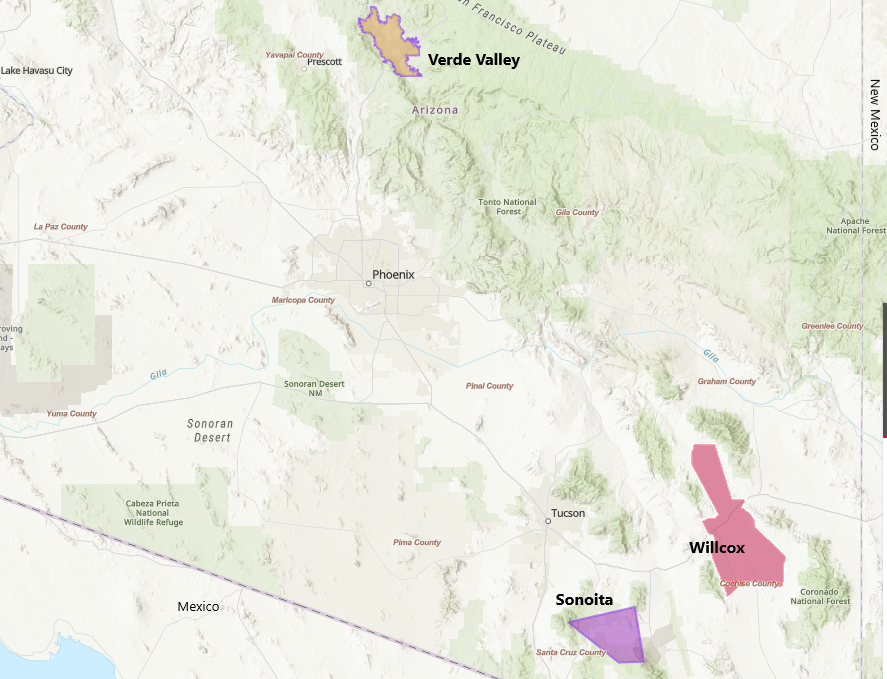
- Official name: State of Arizona
- Type: U.S. State Appellation
- Year established: 1912
- Years of wine industry: 323
- Country: United States
- Sub-regions: Sonoita AVA, Willcox AVA, Verde Valley AVA
- Total area: 72.96 million acres (113,998 sq mi)
- Size of planted vineyards: 808 acres (327 ha)
- Grapes produced: Cabernet Franc, Cabernet Sauvignon, Chardonnay, Concord, Counoise, Gewürztraminer, Graciano, Grenache, Malvasia, Merlot, Mourvèdre, Muscat Canelli, Nebbiolo, Petit Verdot, Petite Sirah, Pinot gris, Pinot noir, Riesling, Sangiovese, Sauvignon blanc, Syrah, Viognier, Zinfandel
- No. of wineries: over 130

Arizona wine refers to wine grapes grown in the U.S. state appellation of Arizona. State names in the United States automatically qualify as legal appellations of origin for wine produced from grapes grown in that state and do not require registration with the Alcohol and Tobacco Tax and Trade Bureau (TTB) of the Treasury Department. TTB was created in January 2003, when the Bureau of Alcohol, Tobacco and Firearms, or ATF, was extensively reorganized under the provisions of the Homeland Security Act of 2002.

There are three viticultural regions of vineyards and wineries in Arizona:

- Verde Valley – 100 mi (160 km) north of Phoenix on SR-260 and SR-89A near Sedona
- Sonoita – south of Tucson on SR-83
- Willcox – east of Tucson on I-10

Most vineyards in Arizona are located in the southeastern portion of the state south and east of Tucson, which is also the location of two of Arizona's established American Viticultural Area (AVA), Sonoita (est. 1985) and Willcox (est. 2016). Arizona's third AVA, Verde Valley, was established in 2021 and located in Yavapai County in central Arizona. Arizona has enjoyed success with wine made from the grape varieties native to Italy and the Rhône Valley of southern France.

It is not clear when viticulture and winemaking first began in Arizona. In 1703, the famous Jesuit missionary and explorer Eusebio Francisco Kino reported growing grapes and making wine for Mass at his Mission Dolores in nearby Sonora. However, historic records suggest there was very little winemaking in Arizona itself during the Spanish period since many of the missions and settlements were not in good winegrowing locations.

During the territorial period, farmers in the Salt River Valley around Phoenix began making wine in the mid-1870s and a small winemaking industry eventually emerged in nearby Mesa during the 1880s. In northern Arizona, Henry Schuerman established a farm and orchard along Oak Creek in the Verde Valley and later planted a large vineyard to make wine for the nearby mining camp of Jerome. As with many areas in the United States, vineyards and wineries were prevalent in Arizona and the Verde Valley prior to Prohibition. Arizona enacted prohibition in 1914, five years before the Federal Government enacted the Volstead Act. It was illegal to make wine in Arizona from 1914 until new legislation was passed in 1982 legalizing it again.

Starting in the mid-1970s, Dr. Gordon Dutt, a soil scientist at the University of Arizona, conducted experiments that demonstrated that parts of Arizona could produce quality wine grapes. Dutt opened Vina Sonoita Vineyards, the first commercial winery and vineyard in Arizona. In 1980, Navy veteran Robert Webb opened the R. W. Webb Winery in Tucson and later established a vineyard south of Willcox. Other pioneering Arizona winemakers during the 1980s and 1990s included William Staltari, Tino Ocheltree, Al Buhl, and Kent Callaghan.

There now are over 130 wineries, vineyards and cellars throughout Arizona, including in the cities of Phoenix and Tucson.

The wineries, vineyards and cellars are supported by three state and regional organizations: the Arizona Wine Growers Association (AWGA), a non-profit educating and promoting the state's wine industry, Willcox Wine Country, a non-profit dedicated to increasing viability of wineries and vineyards in the southeast portion of Arizona, and by the Arizona Vignerons Alliance (AZVA), a non-profit organization collecting data on all Arizona wine-growing regions, ensuring authenticity of Arizona wine and working to promote Arizona wine as recognized, respected and sought after in Arizona, nationally and internationally. AWGA supports the wine industry through promotional events, state awards to the best wines in Arizona and industry lobbying efforts at the local, state and national level. AZVA establishes parameters for growing grapes and producing wines in Arizona; verifies, certifies and promotes 100% Arizona wine; collects, evaluates and shares Arizona viniculture data; holds the annual AZVA Symposium and Wine tasting and participates in existing regional and international events to raise national and global awareness of Arizona wine; and promotes truth in labeling by giving the consumer and wine professional accurate information based on a data-driven and fact-based approach to wine labeling.

Within Verde Valley, the accredited educational institution, Yavapai College offers classes and degrees in both viticulture and enology. The college features a commercial, licensed and bonded winery, vineyard and tasting room, collectively known as the Southwest Wine Center providing education, experience and training for the Arizona wine industry.

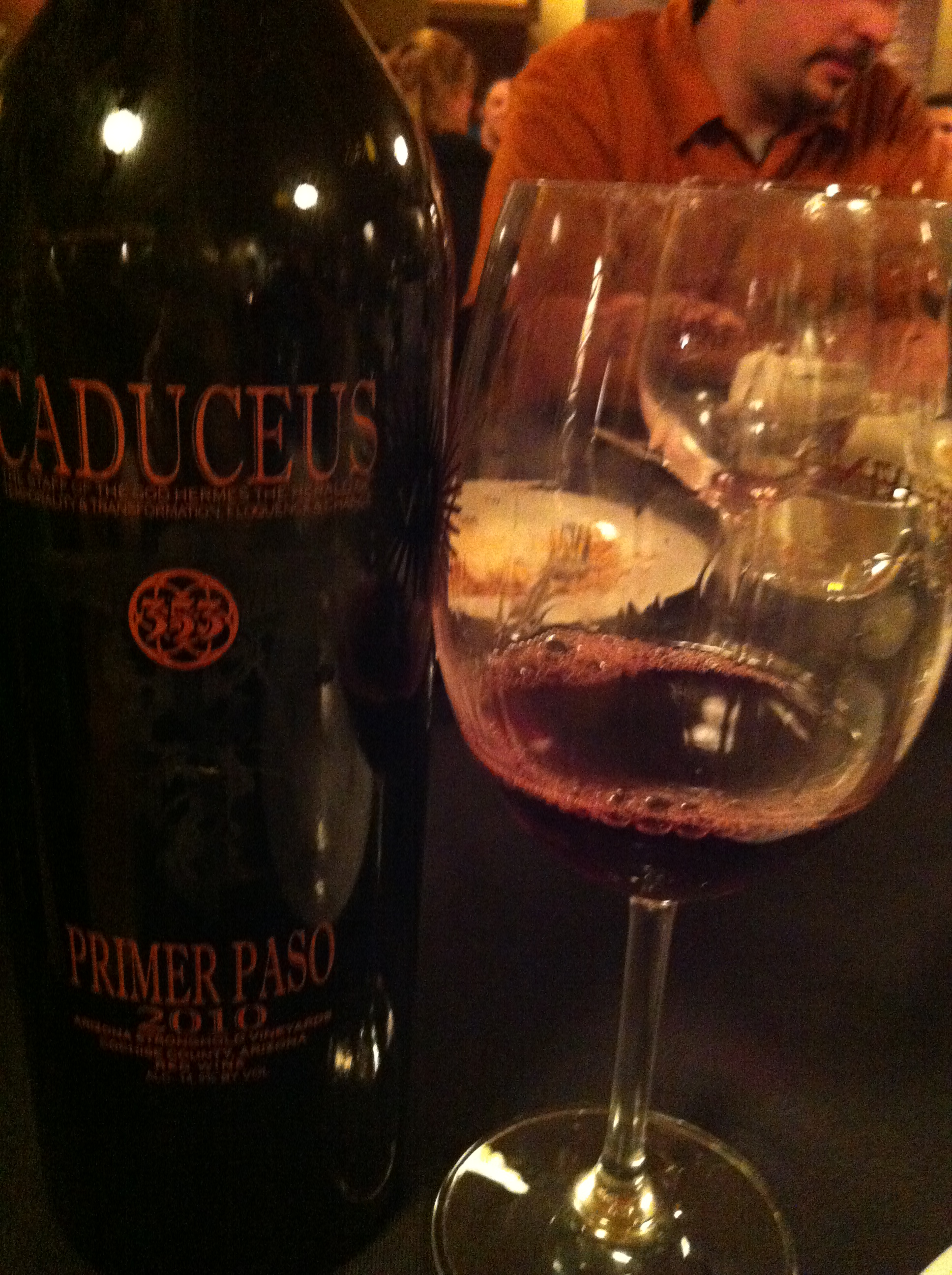
Primer Paso from Caduceus Cellars in Verde Valley

== See also ==
- American wine
- Blood into Wine, a documentary film about the Northern Arizona wine industry
- Caduceus Cellars, an Arizona winery
- Kokopelli Winery, an Arizona winery
- Page Springs Cellars, an Arizona winery
- Superstition Meadery, an Arizona maker of honey-wine
