= Existential Reckoning =

Studio album by Puscifer
- Released: October 30, 2020
- Recorded: 2020
- Studio: Puscifer Studios, North Hollywood, California and The Bunker, Jerome, Arizona
- Genre: Industrial rock; alternative rock; electronic
- Length: 60:01
- Label: Alchemy; BMG
- Producer: Mat Mitchell, Puscifer

Puscifer chronology
Money Shot Your Re-Load (2016)	Existential Reckoning (2020)	Existential Reckoning: ReWired (2023)

Existential Reckoning is the fourth studio album by Puscifer. The album was released on October 30, 2020, by Alchemy Recordings and BMG Rights Management.

== Critical reception ==
Professional ratings
Aggregate scores
Source	Rating
Metacritic	80/100
Review scores
Source	Rating
AllMusic	4/5 stars
Consequence of Sound	B+
Kerrang!	4/5

Existential Reckoning received generally positive reviews from critics. At Metacritic, which assigns a normalized rating out of 100 to reviews from critics, the album received an average score of 80, which indicates "generally favorable reviews", based on 7 reviews.

=== Accolades ===
Publications' year-end list appearances for Existential Reckoning
Critic/Publication	List	Rank	Ref.
Consequence of Sound	Top 30 Metal/Hard Rock Albums of 2020	27	
Revolver	Top 25 Albums of 2020	19	

== Commercial performance ==
Existential Reckoning debuted at number 7 on the US Billboard Top Alternative Albums chart with over 11,000 album-equivalent units, of which 9000 units were pure sales.

== Track listing ==
All tracks are written by Puscifer.

Existential Reckoning track listing
No.	Title	Length
1.	"Bread and Circus"	6:28
2.	"Apocalyptical"	5:22
3.	"The Underwhelming"	5:04
4.	"Grey Area"	3:58
5.	"Theorem"	5:04
6.	"UPGrade"	4:53
7.	"Bullet Train to Iowa"	5:05
8.	"Personal Prometheus"	7:25
9.	"A Singularity"	5:30
10.	"Postulous"	3:41
11.	"Fake Affront"	3:28
12.	"Bedlamite"	4:50
Total length:		60:01

== Personnel ==
Puscifer

- Maynard James Keenan – vocals
- Mat Mitchell – Fairlight (1, 2, 4, 5, 7, 9–12), Voyager (1, 8), Juno-60 (1), bass guitar (1, 3, 7, 12), programming (1), 2600 (2, 8–10), synthesizers (3, 5, 6, 8, 9, 12), Steinberger (3, 5–8, 11, 12), Quantum (4), Synclavier (5, 10), MS-20 (8), S900 (9), Chapman Stick (11)
- Carina Round – vocals, Fairlight (4, 5, 9, 10), Akai S612 (5, 10)

Additional musicians

- Greg Edwards – bass guitar (1, 3–6, 8–12), guitar (1, 2, 7, 8), Deckard's Dream (3, 5), violin (6), sitar (7), synthesizers (9, 11, 12), Synclavier (10)
- Sarah Jones – drums (2–7, 9–12)
- Gunnar Olsen – drums (7, 8)

Technical personnel

- Mat Mitchell – producer, engineer, mixing
- Puscifer – producer
- Carina Round – additional engineering
- Greg Edwards – additional engineering

== Charts ==
Chart performance for Existential Reckoning
Chart (2020)	Peak position
Australian Albums (ARIA)	92
Swiss Albums (Schweizer Hitparade)	57
UK Independent Albums (OCC)	45
US Billboard 200	65
US Independent Albums (Billboard)	13
US Top Rock Albums (Billboard)	12
US Top Alternative Albums (Billboard)	7
