= Verde Valley AVA =

American Viticultural Area in Arizona

Coordinates: 34°43′40″N 112°00′01″W

Verde Valley
- Wine region
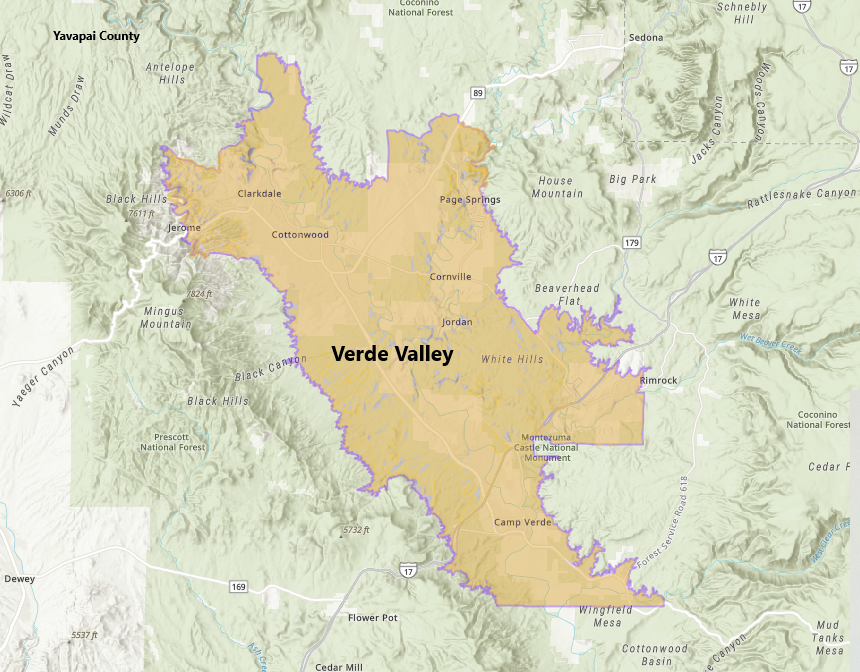
- Type: American Viticultural Area
- Year established: 2021
- Years of wine industry: 31
- Country: United States
- Part of: Arizona
- Other regions in Arizona: Sonoita AVA, Willcox AVA
- Growing season: 175–200 days
- Climate region: Region V
- Heat units: 5,580 GDD units
- Precipitation (annual average): 13.83 in (351 mm)
- Soil conditions: Alluvial soils composed of loams ranging from very fine sandy to gravelly loam with silt and limestone
- Total area: 130,000 acres (200 sq mi)
- Size of planted vineyards: 125 acres (51 ha)
- No. of vineyards: 24
- Grapes produced: Barbera, Cabernet Sauvignon, Chardonnay, Malvasia Bianca, Picpoul Blanc, Petite Sirah, Sangiovese, Seyval Blanc, Syrah, Tannat, Vermentino and Viognier
- No. of wineries: 11

Verde Valley is an American Viticultural Area (AVA) encircling the basin of the Verde River located in Yavapai County of central Arizona approximately 100 miles (160 km) north of the Phoenix metropolitan area. It was established as the nation's 260th and the state's third wine appellation on November 10, 2021 by the Alcohol and Tobacco Tax and Trade Bureau (TTB), Treasury after reviewing the petition submitted by the Verde Valley Wine Consortium (VVWC) on behalf of local grape growers and winemakers proposing the viticultural area named "Verde Valley."

The Verde River flows through the center of the Verde Valley from the northwest to the southeast. Steep foothills surround the valley. The Verde Valley viticultural area encompasses approximately 130,000 acres (200 sq mi) and is not located within, or adjacent to, any other AVA. At the outset, there were 24 commercially-producing vineyards cultivating approximately 125 acres (51 ha) sourcing eleven area wineries. The petition states that an additional 40 acres (16 ha) of vineyards are planned for planting in the next few years. According to the petition, the distinguishing features of the Verde Valley AVA are its climate, soils, and topography.

== History ==
Verde Valley AVA is located within the larger valley landform of the Verde River in central Arizona. According to the petition, the region has been referred to as "Verde Valley" since 1583, when the Spanish explorer Antonio de Espejo recorded his travels in the area while scouting with Zuni and Hopi guides for silver mines. History and reference to the Verde Valley are recorded with visits of European fur trappers and other explorers in the early 1800s. In 1862 the Homestead Act of the U.S. Congress included giving 160 acres (65 ha) tracts of public land in the Verde Valley to citizens who would "settle on the land and use it productively." Soon after, pioneers began pushing into the Verde Valley where they generally became farmers and cattle ranchers. In 1865, Fort Verde was founded in Camp Verde when the settlers appealed for military protection from indigenous tribes who had called this area home for centuries.

Grape growing and winemaking in the Verde Valley and Arizona in general is a relatively new industry, less than 40 years old. As with many areas in the United States, vineyards and wineries were prevalent in Arizona and the Verde Valley prior to Prohibition. Arizona actually enacted prohibition in 1914, five years before the Federal Government passed the Volstead Act. It was illegal to make wine in Arizona from 1914 until new legislation was passed in 1982 legalizing it again. Since the legislation enactment, the number of wineries and vineyards has grown steadily. As of 2000, there was only nine bonded wineries in the entire State of Arizona. More legislation regarding winery, vineyard and tasting room licenses and maintaining statutory compliance in accordance with the U.S. Supreme Court's 2005 ruling in Granholm v. Heald, was enacted in 2006. The legislation jump started the wine industry and today there over 130 licensed and bonded commercial wineries in Arizona, with eleven located within the boundaries of Verde Valley AVA.

== Terroir ==
=== Topography ===
Verde Valley AVA is located within the basin of the Verde River. The petition describes the shape of this basin as a "bowl with a crack in it to the south where the river flows out of the valley." The edges of the "bowl" gently slope down towards the valley floor at angles of 2 to 15 percent. Elevations within the AVA range from approximately 3,000 to 5,000 feet (910–1,520 m), although most of the AVA is below 3,900 feet (1,200 m). The AVA is surrounded on all sides by higher elevations and steeper slopes including the Mingus and Woodchute Mountains with elevations up to 8,000 feet (2,400 m). To the north and northeast of the AVA, elevations rise up along the edge of the Mogollon Rim. The northern boundary also separates the AVA from the Coconino National Forest, primarily following the 3,800-foot (1,200 m) elevation contour because the terrain becomes too steep for cultivation above that elevation. To the west and southwest of the AVA are the Black Mountains, which have steep slopes and elevations up to approximately 7,800 feet (2,400 m). Interestingly, the Verde Valley and the surrounding area beyond the AVA itself, is often referred to as "Arizona's other Grand Canyon." According to the petition, the Verde Valley AVA's topography affects viticulture. Its gentle slopes allow for easier vineyard management than steep slopes. Furthermore, because the AVA is lower than the surrounding regions, cold air drains from the higher elevations into the AVA during the spring and fall. As a result, the risk of frost damage increases in the AVA, particularly in vineyards adjacent to the river. The petition states that vineyard owners attempt to mitigate the risk of frost by using inversion fans and protective sprays and by planting late-budding varietals of grapes.

=== Climate ===
Temperatures within the Verde Valley AVA are warmer than in each of the surrounding regions and provide suitable heat and sunlight for photosynthesis. The warm daytime temperatures lead to high annual growing degree-day (GDD) accumulations. According to the petition, the temperatures and GDD accumulations within the AVA are best suited for growing warm-climate grapes such as Syrah, Cabernet Sauvignon, Petite Sirah, Zinfandel, Malvasia Bianca, and Viognier. Finally, the petition included a discussion of the difference between the daytime high temperatures and nighttime low temperatures within the AVA and the surrounding regions. The petition referred to these temperature differences as "diurnal temperature swings." Although temperatures in the AVA are high during the daytime, cool nighttime air drains into the AVA from the surrounding higher elevations and lowers the nighttime temperatures. As a result, the difference between daytime high temperatures and nighttime low temperatures within the AVA can exceed 30 °F (−1 °C), which is a greater difference than found in any of the surrounding regions. According to the petition, such a significant drop in nighttime temperatures delays grape ripening, lessens the respiration of acids, and increases phenolic development in the grapes. Average annual rainfall amounts within the Verde Valley AVA are significantly lower than in the surrounding regions. Due to the low rainfall amounts, vineyard owners within the AVA must use irrigation to ensure adequate hydration for their vines. The petition states that there are sufficient sources of groundwater within the AVA for irrigation, and vineyard owners also employ water conservation methods such as drip irrigation and the use of agriculturally approved reclaimed water.

=== Soils ===
The soils within the Verde Valley AVA are primarily alluvial soils. According to the petition, the majority of the soils within the AVA are of the Altar, Mule, Cornville, Anthony, Retriever, House Mountain, Cowan, and Arizo soil series. The composition of these soils ranges from very fine sandy loam to gravelly loam with silt and limestone. Traces of the Supai, Verde, and Martin Limestone formations can also be found throughout the AVA. The soils of the AVA generally provide appropriate water drainage and have above-moderate levels of nutrients, although low calcium and magnesium levels are common. Additionally, the high bicarbonate levels in the groundwater of the AVA have been found to increase soil pH and inhibit nutrient uptake in the vines. The petition states that these unfavorable vineyard conditions can be mitigated through rootstock, varietal, and clonal selections that can tolerate and even benefit from these nutrient deficiencies. To the north and east of the Verde Valley AVA, along the Mogollon Rim, the soils are described in the petition as "stony". The most prominent soil series in these two regions are Brolliar stony loam and Siesta stony silt loam. According to the petition, the remainder of the soil to the north and east of the AVA is composed of approximately 22 other defined soil series, most of which have the terms "stony" or "very stony" in their names. To the west and southwest of the AVA, in the Black Hills, the soils are also typically stony. Major soil series in these regions include Brolliar very stony clay loam, Soldier cobbly loam, Lonti-Wineg, and Lynx.

== Viticulture ==
As one of the three Arizona viticulture regions, Verde Valley proudly promotes the vintages produced by its local wineries and vineyards. The Verde Valley Wine Consortium is the local trade organization that promotes, enhances and connects the wine community in Verde Valley. The viticultural area contains more than 24 commercial vineyards with just over 125 acres (51 ha) currently under vine with future plans for an additional 40 acres (16 ha). At least 11 wineries and 25 tasting rooms are resident within the AVA including Caduceus Cellars, the Original Jerome Winery, Cabal Cellars and Arizona Stronghold creating an official enotourism 'wine trail,' More than 40 different grape varieties are grown in the Verde Valley. Leading white grapes include Malvasia Bianca, Viognier, Chardonnay, Vermentino, Seyval Blanc, and Picpoul Blanc; leading red grape varieties include Syrah, Petite Sirah, Cabernet Sauvignon, Sangiovese, Tannat, and Barbera. Within the AVA, the accredited educational institution, Yavapai College offers classes and degrees in both viticulture and enology. The college features a commercial, licensed and bonded winery, vineyard and tasting room, collectively known as the Southwest Wine Center. Enrollment in the viticulture and enology programs has steadily risen since its 2009 commencement.
