= Eliphante =

Sculptural village in Yavapai County, Arizona

Coordinates: 34.689154°N 111.910150°W

Eliphante is a kaleidoscopic, hand-built sculptural village in Cornville, Arizona. It was built by Michael Kahn and his wife Leda Livant over a 28-year period beginning in 1979, before his death in 2007.

== Structure ==
In many respects, the structure has all the basic amenities of an ordinary building, such as central heating, electricity and running water, although the main building does not have a bathroom. It is composed of area including the living quarters, dubbed the "Hippodome" which features a kitchen counter top that flows in a spiral from wall to ceiling.

The design of the main building wasn't planned but instead developed organically as the artist progressed. The building responsible for the name of the village has a trunk-like entrance built of rock and an irregularly rounded roof, giving the building an elephant-like appearance.

The walls were constructed from rebar and pipes coated with concrete, with a variety of other materials attached, including glass, wood, rocks and pottery shards. The entire complex covers three acres and is managed by Eliphante, Ltd., a non-profit organization.
