= Willcox AVA =

Wine growing region in southeastern Arizona, US

Coordinates: 31°53′38″N 109°28′30″W

Willcox
- Wine region
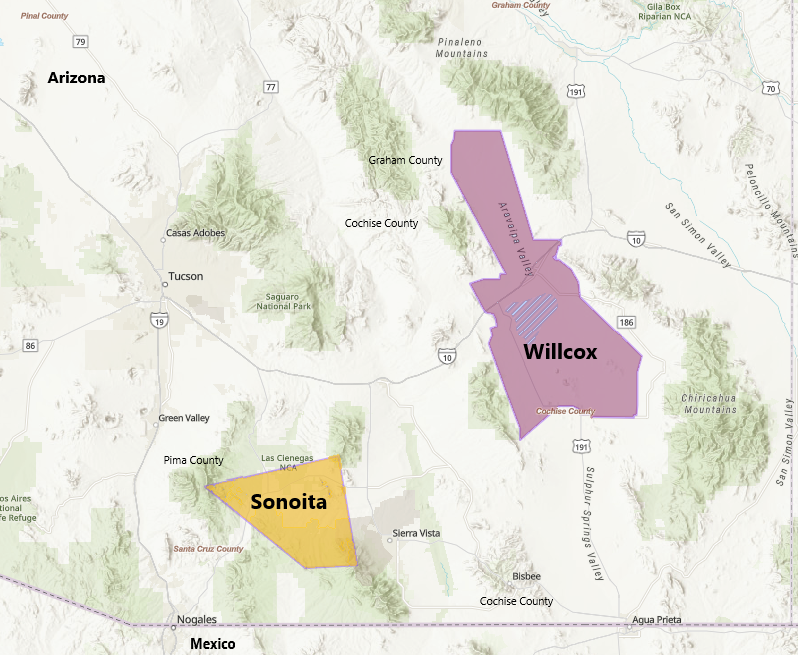
- Type: American Viticultural Area
- Year established: 2016
- Years of wine industry: 42
- Country: United States
- Part of: Arizona
- Other regions in Arizona: Sonoita AVA, Verde Valley AVA
- Growing season: 192 days
- Climate region: Region V
- Heat units: 4,170 GDD units
- Precipitation (annual average): 8.42 in (214 mm)
- Soil conditions: Loams composed of sand, silt, and clay
- Total area: 526,000 acres (822 sq mi)
- Size of planted vineyards: 454 acres (184 ha) planned: 650 acres (260 ha)
- No. of vineyards: 21
- Grapes produced: Cabernet Franc, Cabernet Sauvignon, Chardonnay, Gewurztraminer, Malbec, Malvasia Bianca, Marsanne, Merlot, Mourvèdre, Muscat, Nebbiolo, Norton, Pinot Gris, Pinot Noir, Petite Sirah, Riesling, Sangiovese, Sauvignon Blanc, Sémillon, Syrah, Tempranillo, Trebbiano, Viognier and Zinfandel
- No. of wineries: 18

Willcox is an American Viticultural Area (AVA) located in Cochise and Graham Counties of southeastern Arizona, centered around the city of Willcox and bisected on a southwest–northeast axis by Interstate 10. It was established as the nation's 238^{th} and the state's second AVA wine appellation on September 12, 2016 by the Alcohol and Tobacco Tax and Trade Bureau (TTB), Treasury after reviewing a petition submitted by Paul S. Hagar, the special projects manager of Dragoon Mountain Vineyard, on behalf of Dragoon Mountain Vineyard and other local winery and vineyard owners, proposing the viticultural area named "Willcox."

The region consists mostly of flat terrain at over 4,000 ft (1,200 m) in elevation, including the Aravaipa Valley and much of Sulphur Springs Valley. A large natural landform in the interior, nearly center, is Willcox Playa, a dry bed of an ancient lake and lowest elevation of the viticultural area at 4,135 ft (1,260 m). Willcox AVA is encircled by the Chiricahua Mountains and Dos Cabezas Mountains to the east, the Pinaleño Mountains to the northeast, and the Dragoon Mountains to the west. Sixty miles (97 km) to the southwest is the Sonoita AVA, and 120 miles (190 km) to the east, in New Mexico, is the Mimbres Valley AVA. Just east of the AVA are Fort Bowie National Historic Site, Chiricahua National Monument, and Coronado National Forest.

Willcox viticultural area is approximately 526,000 acres (822 sq mi), the state's largest, containing 21 commercially-producing vineyards cultivating approximately 454 acres (184 ha) distributed throughout the area sourcing 18 wineries. According to the petition, there was an additional 650 acres (260 ha) of vineyards planned for the near future. Approximately 85% of Arizona's wine grapes are grown within the Willcox viticultural area. Willcox AVA is not located within any established AVA. The distinguishing features of the Willcox AVA are its geology, topography, soils, and climate. In 2021, Willcox viticultural area became one of three viticulture regions in the state, along with the older Sonoita and the new addition Verde Valley in central Arizona.

== History ==
Willcox viticultural area has a significant agricultural history. Cattle ranching predominated until about 1920, when irrigated crop production increased. Sorghum has been a key crop as livestock feed. Other crops included corn, barley, wheat, alfalfa, beans, chilis, and cotton. Cotton has more recently diminished since 1980 and nut and fruit orchards have increased. Wine grape growing was pioneered in the area by R. W. 'Bob' Webb and his partners in 1984. They planted what is now the Arizona Stronghold Vineyard near Wayward Winds Road south of Willcox. In the last ten years a substantial increase in vineyards and plantings occurred with notably expansion into the region by vineyard owners from the two other grape growing areas in the state, Sonoita and the Verde Valley. These investment decisions reflect recognition by established Arizona vineyard operators of the unique features found within the larger viticultural area and its positive influence on the grapes produced. About 2/3 of Arizona wine grapes are grown in the Willcox region. Wines produced from Willcox grapes make up a major proportion of Arizona wines rated 85 or better by Wine Spectator. 51% of those Arizona wines are labeled Cochise County or Graham County and exclusively from grapes grown within Willcox AVA.

== Terroir ==
=== Geology ===
Willcox AVA is in the Arizona geological province known as the "basin-and-range", characterized by high mountain ranges that are separated by valleys. The features of the basin-and-range province were formed over millions of years by periods of massive volcanic explosions and the pushing, folding, and stretching of the Earth's crust. The underlying geology of the basin in the AVA is primarily composed of alluvial (water-borne) and eolianite (wind-borne) deposits. By contrast, the underlying geology of the surrounding mountain ranges is composed mostly of igneous rocks derived from volcanic materials, such as rhyolite, granite, and tuff. The most recent period of geologic activity in the region of the AVA occurred between 15 and 8 million years ago, during a period of modest volcanic activity and intense stretching of the crust. The stretching of the crust caused large blocks of the mountains to drop thousands of feet in a nearly vertical manner. This vertical block faulting resulted in the formation of the Chiricahua, Dos Cabezas, Pinalenos, Dragoon, Little Dragoon, and Winchester Mountains that surround the Willcox AVA and contrast with the flat, shallow basin of the AVA. Early in this last period of major geologic activity, existing drainage systems such as creeks and rivers were disrupted throughout southeastern Arizona, and many valleys became closed basins. A closed basin is a valley in which no water flows in or out, and any lakes or underground aquifers within the closed basin are replenished only through rainfall. Over time, many of the closed basins near the AVA became filled with enough erosional deposits from the surrounding mountains to allow streams to flow once more into and through the basins. These basins, where streams now flow, include the Gila River Valley to the north, the San Simon Valley to the east, the San Pedro Valley to the west, the Aravaipa Valley to the northwest, and the Sulphur Springs Valley to the south. The Willcox basin, however, was permanently closed.

The closed nature of the Willcox basin allowed it to retain large quantities of rainwater during a cool, wet period between 2 million and 15,000 years ago. Thus, an ancient lake formed, known as Lake Cochise. Later, as the climate became warmer and drier, the lake began to evaporate, and the clay sediments and alkali salts in the water settled in the shallower southern end of the lake. Today, the remains of the southern end of Lake Cochise form the Willcox Playa, a large, dry, alkali flat in the west-central portion of the Willcox AVA.

The geologic forces that shaped the Willcox AVA have an effect on viticulture. Because the basin system is closed, irrigation water comes solely from wells and the small amounts of annual rainfall that the region receives. The petition also notes that water is not brought into the AVA via canals, aqueducts, or other man-made methods. As a result, vineyard owners within the AVA must carefully manage their water usage through water-conserving methods such as drip irrigation.

=== Topography ===
Willcox AVA sits within a large, shallow basin. Elevations within the AVA range from 4,135 ft (1,260 m) in the Willcox Playa to 4,700 ft (1,400 m) at the edge of the foothills of the Chiricahua Mountains along the eastern edge of the AVA. Because the AVA is within a closed basin system, the basin's floor has not been cut or eroded by flowing bodies of water such as creeks, streams, or rivers. As a result, the terrain within the AVA is relatively uniform and very flat, with slope angles ranging from 0 to 1.5 percent. The topography of the Willcox AVA affects viticulture. The small range of elevations and the flat terrain allow for relative uniformity of vineyard sites and growing conditions throughout the AVA. The shallow slopes and the lack of creeks or streams within the AVA reduce the risk of erosion. The flat basin floor allows for abundant sunlight to reach the vines, which stimulates vine growth and fruit maturation. Due to the intense sunlight, vineyard owners must manage the leaf canopies carefully so that the fruit does not become sunburned, while preventing the canopies from becoming so dense and shady that the fruit does not reach optimum ripeness. Finally, because the AVA is lower and flatter than the neighboring mountain ranges, cool nighttime air flowing down from the mountains settles in the AVA. During the early spring, the cooler air can reach sub-freezing temperatures, which can damage new growth or buds on the vines. To protect their vines, vineyard owners often install tall fans to mix warmer ambient air with the cooler descending air streams and to prevent the cold air from pooling.

Several mountain ranges surround the AVA, including the Pinaleno Mountains to the north and northeast, the Dos Cabezas and Chiricahua Mountains to the east, and the Dragoon, Little Dragoon, and Winchester Mountains to the west. The elevations within these ranges are higher than those found within the Willcox AVA. Large valleys with elevations lower than those found in the AVA extend beyond each of these mountain ranges. The Gila Valley lies to the north, the San Simon Valley lies to the east, the San Pedro Valley lies to the west, and the Aravaipa Valley lies to the northwest. All of these valleys, along with the Sulphur Springs Valley south of the AVA boundary, also are open basin systems. Because these valleys are open basin systems, their valley floors have been eroded by running water. The continual erosion results in a steady descent in elevation along the long axis of each of the valleys, which contrasts with the generally level valley floor of the closed basin system that contains the AVA.

=== Climate ===
Southeastern Arizona, including the region of the Willcox AVA, is generally considered to have an arid climate. Annual precipitation amounts in the region are very low. According to the petition, slight amounts of rain may fall at the end of winter, when the vines are emerging from dormancy. However, the most significant rainfall occurs during the monsoon season, in July and August. During the monsoon season, the large-scale atmospheric circulation shifts to initiate a flow of humid air from both the Gulf of Mexico and the Gulf of California. This flow of humid air brings more cloud cover and scattered rainfall in the form of thunderstorms. Annual growing season precipitation amounts within the Willcox AVA are higher than those of all the stations in the surrounding areas except the Chiricahua Mountains and Benson. The petition states that rainfall amounts are higher in areas close to the mountains and foothills, such as the locations to the southeast and southwest of the AVA, because the moisture-laden air cools as it rises over the hills and eventually reaches the point where it releases its moisture in the form of rain. As the storms move beyond the mountains and foothills, they begin to weaken and dissipate. Throughout the region of the AVA, temperatures are affected by elevation. The warmest temperatures are typically in areas with low elevations. The warmest daytime high temperatures typically occur in June and are accompanied by strong afternoon winds. The data shows that annual growing season high temperatures within the Willcox AVA are lower than those in four of the six surrounding regions. The four regions are all at significantly lower elevations than the AVA. Temperatures in Douglas, AZ, which is at a similar elevation to the AVA, are nearly identical to those of the AVA. Of the six surrounding weather stations, the station within the Chiricahua Mountains, adjacent to the southeastern boundary of the AVA, is at the highest elevation and, as a result, has the lowest average high temperature. During the months of May and June, temperatures within the Willcox AVA are noticeably lower than in all of the surrounding regions, with the exception of the higher elevations of the Chiricahua Mountains. The petition notes that May and June, just before the start of the monsoon season, are the most stressful months for vines. The air is very dry, and most of the water stored in the soil from late winter rains has been depleted. Temperatures begin to rise noticeably during these two months, placing heat stress on the vines and increasing the amount of water that evaporates from their leaves. Therefore, in such a warm region as southeastern Arizona, average high temperatures that are only a few degrees cooler than the surrounding area offer respite to the vines, particularly during the hot, dry pre-monsoon months. The climate of the Willcox AVA affects viticulture. The hot temperatures, combined with extremely dry air for much of the growing season, put heavy stress on the vines. In order to preserve water, the vines close the stoma on their leaves during the hottest parts of the day, especially when temperatures rise above 90 °F (32 °C). When the stoma are closed, however, photosynthesis slows considerably, preventing the plant from producing food efficiently. As a result, fruit development and maturation is delayed. The lack of cloud cover for most of the growing season puts the grapes at risk for sunburn. So vineyard owners within the AVA manage canopy levels to provide shelter for the fruit. Although the rainfall amounts during the monsoonal season are not heavy enough to eliminate the need for irrigation, the rains do provide some relief for the vines and also replenish the aquifer, which is the only source of water within the closed basin system that forms the AVA. Additionally, the monsoon season brings relief to the vines in the form of higher humidity levels, which allow the stoma to remain open longer and produce food for the vine during the peak period of fruit development. Finally, the increased cloud cover during the monsoon season lowers temperatures slightly and provides the maturing grapes some protection from sunburn. The USDA plant hardiness zones are 8a and 8b.

=== Soils ===
Although all of the valleys in southeastern Arizona contain soils derived from the erosion of the surrounding mountains, the petition notes that each mountain block has its own specific geologic details. As a result, each valley below will have its own unique soil profile. The soils within the Willcox AVA are predominately loams composed of sand, silt, and clay in relatively even proportions. The petition included a list of the 30 soil series that, together, account for 80 percent of the soils of the Willcox AVA. Of these 30 soil series, 20 are specifically loams. The Tubac, Sonoita, Forrest, and Frye soils are the most common soils on which viticulture occurs within the AVA and are all classified as loamy soils. These soils are described as slightly acidic in the first 9 to 12 inches (23–30 cm) of the soil profile, with a gradually increasing alkalinity below that to a depth of 5 feet (1.5 m). According to the petition, loams generally contain high levels of nutrients. For this reason, loams are not typically preferred for vineyards, because high levels of nutrients can cause overly vigorous vine and leaf growth. However, the petition notes that the stress placed on the vines by the hot, dry climate of the AVA keeps vine and leaf growth in check, so there is little chance the vines will grow too vigorously. Loamy soils also retain adequate amounts of water to hydrate vineyards while allowing excess water to percolate quickly through the soils and into the aquifer. Because vineyard owners within the AVA rely primarily on the aquifer for irrigation, soils that both retain water and allow for quick recharging of the aquifer are beneficial. Only 11 of the 30 most common soils found in the Willcox AVA make up at least one tenth of one percent of the total soils found in at least one of the surrounding regions. Together, these 11 soils represent approximately 30 percent of all the soils within the Willcox AVA.

== Viticulture ==
Arizona Stronghold Vineyards (ASV) was founded in 2007 producing world class wines from the Willcox area. Arizona Stronghold is a family-owned business and is the largest winery in the state. All of its wine grapes are sourced from their own vineyards or other quality Arizona grape growers. Their vintages are available in wine shops and retail outlets across the state, as well as its two tasting rooms in Old Town Cottonwood and Old Town Scottsdale.
