= Oak Creek Ranch School =

Defunct therapeutic boarding school in Cornville, Arizona, United States

Coordinates: 34°45′4.74″N 111°53′27.61″W

Location
- 1165 E Willow Point Rd; Cornville, Arizona 86325; United States

Information
- School type: Boarding school
- Established: 1972
- Closed: 2017
- Grades: 7–12
- Enrollment: Approx. 90
- Colors: Red, white, and blue
- Athletics conference: Community Sports Conference

The Oak Creek Ranch School was a co-ed ranch school in Cornville in the U.S. state of Arizona. The campus was on a 17-acre (6.9 ha) area of land on the banks of the Oak Creek, 15 miles (24 km) southwest of Sedona. It focused on students with attention deficit disorder (ADD) and attention deficit hyperactivity disorder (ADHD). It was founded in 1972 by David Wick, Sr., father of the current headmaster of the school.
