= Kokopelli Seed Foundation =

French open-pollinated seed distribution foundation

Kokopelli Seed Foundation was created in December 2003 by Dominique Guillet to build a link from Europe's Association Kokopelli to North America, the purpose of Association Kokopelli being to provide access to open-pollinated seeds, as a way to alleviate hunger and promote sustainable food security.

The Seed Foundation has subsequently begun a variety of programs:

- The creation in Mexico in 2005 of a seed-center and seed-school similar to the seed-center Annadana initiated by Association Kokopelli in India.
- Seed workshops in Mexico and Guatemala starting in January 2004, presentation in a conference in Costa Rica on biointensive gardening in October 2004, and more seed workshops in Costa Rica, Mexico, and Guatemala in November 2004.
- “Seeds for Life”, a campaign to donate seeds to Third World countries, inspired by the campaign initiated by Association Kokopelli in France, "Semences sans Frontières," or "Seeds without Borders".
