= Children of the Anachronistic Dynasty =

American rock band

- Origin: Grand Rapids, Michigan
- Genres: Industrial rock, post-punk
- Years active: 1986–1987
- Past members: Tom Geluso; Stan Henderson; Kevin Horning; Todd Horning; Maynard James Keenan

Children of the Anachronistic Dynasty (also known as C.A.D.) was an American rock band based in Grand Rapids, Michigan, notable for being one of the early bands of Maynard James Keenan, later of the bands Tool, A Perfect Circle and Puscifer among others.

== Recordings ==
Children of the Anachronistic Dynasty first recorded a demo, an independent cassette called Fingernails in 1986, in Keenan's living room. While Horning played the guitar, Keenan sang, played bass and worked the drum machine. It is considered their "best-known recording."

One song on the cassette, "Burn About Out" is considered to be in part an early version of the Tool song "Sober". Although its tempo is faster when compared to "Sober" and it lacks the "anthemic chorus," the verse melody is the same and most of the lyrics are present.

The following year, they recorded a second EP called Dog. Tail, a cassette sought after due to scarcity in copies. The three other members from Tex A.N.S., Tom Geluso, Stan Henderson, and Todd Horning were recruited to support Children of the Anachronistic Dynasty after Keenan asked them to return. Filmed on stage at the Kendall College of Art & Design, Children of the Anachronistic Dynasty appeared on a Grand Rapids public access channel in April 1987 performing a few songs off of Fingernails, including "Burn About Out." The airing also featured an interview with Keenan.

== Discography ==
- Fingernails (1986)
- Dog. House. (1987)
- Peace Day (VHS release, 1987)

== Members ==
- Tom Geluso – percussion (1987)
- Stanley D.Henderson – bass (1987)
- Kevin Horning – lead guitar (1986–1987)
- Todd Horning – rhythm guitar (1987)
- Maynard James Keenan – vocals (1986–1987), bass, drum machine (1986)

Information on band members.

== See also ==
- Tool
- A Perfect Circle
- Puscifer
