= Cornville, Arizona =

CDP in Yavapai County, Arizona

- Unincorporated community Census-designated place
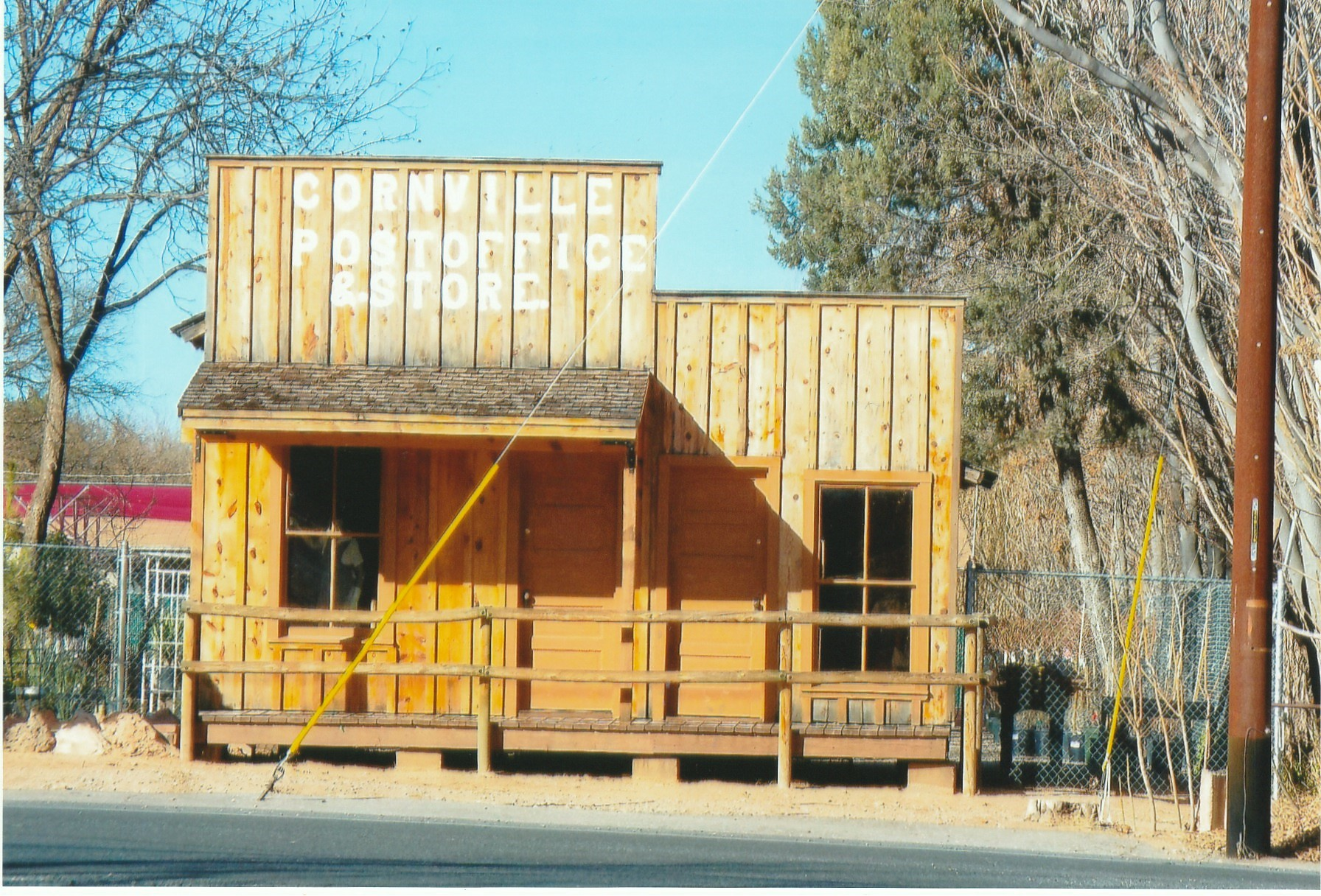
- 1909 Cornville Post Office

- Location in Yavapai County and the state of Arizona

- Location in the United States Cornville (the United States)
- Coordinates: 34°45′20″N 111°54′28″W
- Country: United States
- State: Arizona
- County: Yavapai

Area
  - Total: 13.97 sq mi (36.19 km^{2})
  - Land: 13.97 sq mi (36.19 km^{2})
  - Water: 0 sq mi (0.00 km^{2})
- Elevation: 3,455 ft (1,053 m)

Population (2020)
  - Total: 3,362
  - Density: 240.6/sq mi (92.89/km^{2})
- Time zone: UTC−07:00 (MST)
- ZIP Code: 86325
- Area code: 928
- FIPS code: 04-15920
- GNIS feature ID: 2407662

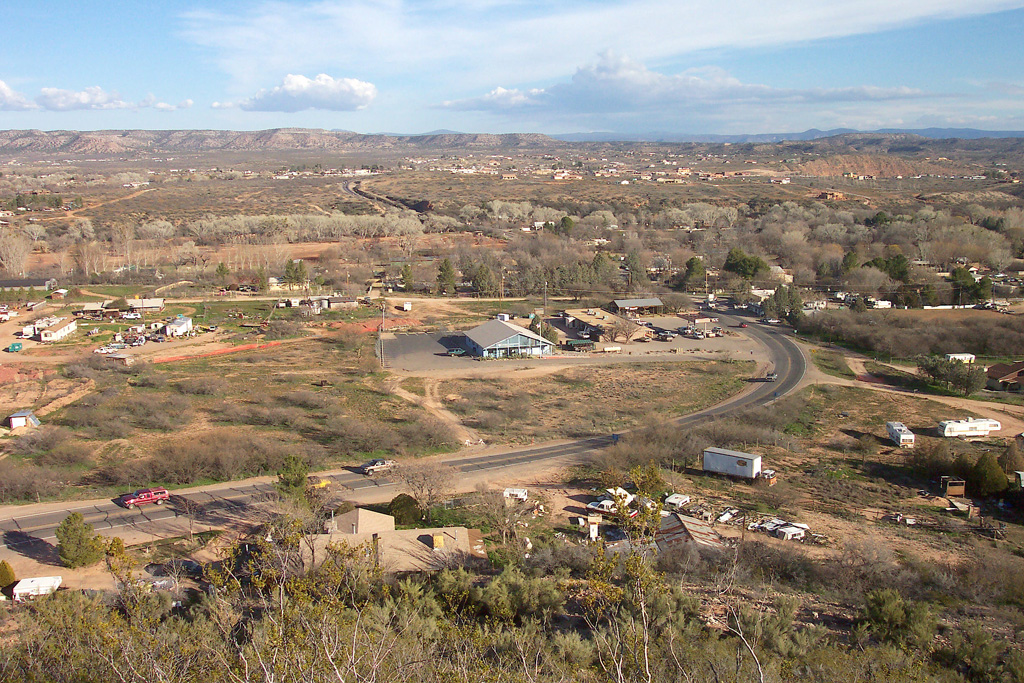
Cornville in 2005

Cornville is an unincorporated community in Yavapai County, Arizona, United States. The population as of the 2010 United States census was 3,280, down from 3,335 at the 2000 census. For statistical purposes, the United States Census Bureau has defined Cornville as a census-designated place (CDP) that includes the communities of Cornville and Page Springs.

Cornville and Page Springs are rapidly growing suburban areas that serve as bedroom communities for nearby Sedona and Cottonwood. Both communities are located along Oak Creek, a tributary of the Verde River. Lower Oak Creek has been designated an Important Bird Area by the National Audubon Society. Page Springs hosts a large fish hatchery operated by the Arizona Game and Fish Department. Adjacent to the hatchery are creekside hiking trails and bird-watching areas.

Cornville's best-known resident was U.S. Senator and 2008 Republican presidential nominee John McCain. McCain's home in the community, referred to in the media as his "Sedona Cabin," is where he and his running-mate, Alaska governor Sarah Palin, prepared for their debates. On August 25, 2018, McCain died in his home in Cornville.

== History ==
The Cornville area, particularly above and below the Cornville Bridge on Oak Creek, was well settled by the Sinagua. The Sinagua had disappeared from the abandoned buildings at nearby Montezuma Castle National Monument by the early 15th century. Some Hopi clans claim descent from these Sinagua.

The earliest recorded written history of the area finds it occupied by the Yavapai people. Spanish explorer Antonio de Espejo passed through what is now Cornville on May 7 or 8, 1583, on his way to what would later become Jerome, Arizona. The Yavapai were quite friendly with the explorers, apparently regarding them as supernatural or godlike. Later expeditions over the next 25 years entered the region but with increasing hostility from the Native American peoples which may stem in part from the advent of the Apache and Navajo people in the region. Failure to find mineral resources profitably extractable according to the standards of the day, and the distance from other Spanish settlements caused the Spaniards to cease exploration of the area.

By the time mountain men began to arrive in the late 1820s and settlers began to arrive again in the 1860s the people of the Cornville area were a mixed community of Apache (Dil-ze'e) and Yavapai (Wipukepaya), though the Apache are thought to have been more numerous on the east side of the Verde River. The area that is now lower Oak Creek was more or less on the border of the area occupied by the Dil-ze'e Chein-chii-ii (or Red Rock Clan) and Yaa-go-gain (White Land Clan) The US army gathered the Yavapai and Apache people in the area and in 1875 removed them in a tragic and brutal march and exile to the San Carlos Reservation in Eastern Arizona, but many Dilze'e remained in hiding in the Lower Oak Creek and adjoining White Hills area As late as 1876, numerous Dil-ze'e still lived on or near Lower Oak Creek.

Relations between settlers and indigenous peoples in the Verde Valley were essentially peaceful from that point on and with the rapid increase in settlers along Oak Creek, although there were "Indian scares" into the 1880s mostly in connection with conflicts elsewhere: In the words of settler W. A. Jordan, in about 1880 "The settlers were in no danger from this band of hunters [that he had just met between Clarkdale and Cornville], but they were so wrought up over the stories of massacres and murders that the Indians themselves were in the greatest danger." There was resistance among part though not all of the settler population to ending the prohibition on the return or the Dil-ze'e and Yavapai from San Carlos. Most remaining or Dil-ze'e and Yavapai lost hope of abiding peacefully and unmolested amidst increasing numbers of settlers and left to join returnees from the San Carlos Reservation in nearby communities in Camp Verde and Clarkdale. They did continue for many years to hunt throughout the valley and to gather food in traditional ways.

The first settlers in the Lower Oak Creek area were Captain Andrew Jackson, a retired Confederate officer from Virginia, and his wife, Margaret, who arrived in the spring of 1876. Several other families including the Dickinsons, Munds, Copples, Pages, Mullhollands and Tiptons had followed by the autumn of that year or the spring of 1877. The settlers quickly built an irrigation ditch serving farms on the west side of Oak Creek.

As to the adoption of the name of "Cornville", "At a meeting of Verde Valley pioneers, one of them said it was the intention to name it Cohnville, for a family named Cohn that lived there. When the papers came back from Washington, they had read it Cornville, so the settlers accepted the name."—Letter, L.J. Putsch, early Forest Ranger. However, there was no family name Cohn or Kohn in the Cornville area in 1880 according to the United States Census of 1880. However, there was a Mr. Cone who together with his partner a Mr. Houghton had purchased a proved homestead in what is now Page Springs from Benjamin Coppel in 1878, farmed a year and then rented the property to a family from Arkansas. Both Mr. Cone and Mr. Houghton sold their interests in the ranch to James Page in about 1880. Another theory of the origin of the name of "Cornville" for the town can be deduced from an early settler, James Dunning Tewksbury, who was born in Cornville, Maine in 1823. The Tewksburys were involved in the Pleasant Valley War, a range war in the area now known as Young, Arizona.

The Cornville post office was established on May 11, 1887, and Samuel Dickinson was postmaster until 1907. It is likely that he applied for the name "Cornville". With the Great Depression and a decline in profits from cattle ranching, much of Cornville was reduced to subsistence or near subsistence agriculture in the first half of the 20th century. Some families ranched the surrounding grazing lands while others went to work in the mines and smelters of Jerome, Clarkdale, and Cottonwood. The town remained almost entirely agricultural until the late 1960s, when numbers of retirees and residents who commuted to work in nearby towns began to increase dramatically.

The community of Verde Santa Fe was founded in 1995. It is a home golf-course community in Cornville, along State Route 89A, between Cottonwood and Sedona. The community consists of nearly 1,000 homes in 10 subdivisions.

== Geography ==
According to the United States Census Bureau, the CDP has a total area of 13.2 square miles (34 km^{2}), all land.

=== Climate ===
According to the Köppen Climate Classification system, Cornville has a semi-arid climate, abbreviated "BSk" on climate maps.

== Demographics ==
Historical population
Census	Pop.	Note	%±
1990	2,089		—
2000	3,335		59.6%
2010	3,280		−1.6%
2020	3,362		2.5%
U.S. Decennial Census

=== 2020 census ===
As of the 2020 census, Cornville had a population of 3,362. The median age was 56.3 years. 14.8% of residents were under the age of 18 and 31.9% of residents were 65 years of age or older. For every 100 females there were 101.2 males, and for every 100 females age 18 and over there were 101.5 males age 18 and over.

0.0% of residents lived in urban areas, while 100.0% lived in rural areas.

There were 1,454 households in Cornville, of which 17.0% had children under the age of 18 living in them. Of all households, 46.0% were married-couple households, 20.2% were households with a male householder and no spouse or partner present, and 27.0% were households with a female householder and no spouse or partner present. About 29.3% of all households were made up of individuals and 16.4% had someone living alone who was 65 years of age or older.

There were 1,698 housing units, of which 14.4% were vacant. The homeowner vacancy rate was 2.3% and the rental vacancy rate was 6.3%.

Racial composition as of the 2020 census
Race	Number	Percent
White	2,817	83.8%
Black or African American	16	0.5%
American Indian and Alaska Native	34	1.0%
Asian	17	0.5%
Native Hawaiian and Other Pacific Islander	2	0.1%
Some other race	170	5.1%
Two or more races	306	9.1%
Hispanic or Latino (of any race)	448	13.3%

=== 2000 census ===
As of the census of 2000, there were 3,335 people, 1,311 households, and 895 families residing in the CDP. The population density was 252.1 inhabitants per square mile (97.3/km^{2}). There were 1,441 housing units at an average density of 108.9 per square mile (42.0/km^{2}). The racial makeup of the CDP was 93.2% White, 0.4% Black or African American, 0.8% Native American, 0.6% Asian, 0.1% Pacific Islander, 2.7% from other races, and 2.2% from two or more races. 9.1% of the population were Hispanic or Latino of any race.

There were 1,311 households, out of which 28.7% had children under the age of 18 living with them, 54.2% were married couples living together, 8.9% had a female householder with no husband present, and 31.7% were non-families. 23.6% of all households were made up of individuals, and 6.6% had someone living alone who was 65 years of age or older. The average household size was 2.47 and the average family size was 2.89.

In the CDP, the population was spread out, with 24.5% under the age of 18, 6.2% from 18 to 24, 25.9% from 25 to 44, 30.0% from 45 to 64, and 13.4% who were 65 years of age or older. The median age was 41 years. For every 100 females, there were 101.5 males. For every 100 females age 18 and over, there were 96.9 males.

The median income for a household in the CDP was $36,992, and the median income for a family was $42,333. Males had a median income of $31,567 versus $21,653 for females. The per capita income for the CDP was $16,500. About 11.0% of families and 15.9% of the population were below the poverty line, including 19.5% of those under age 18 and 8.7% of those age 65 or over.

== Attractions ==
Eliphante, which is "three acres of fantastical domes, shacks and follies", is a hand-built sculptural village, created since 1987 by Michael Kahn, Leda Livant Kahn, and other artists, is in Cornville, and cared after by non-profit organization Eliphante, Ltd.

== Education ==
It is in the Cottonwood-Oak Creek School District and the Mingus Union High School District. Oak Creek Elementary School of the Cottonwood-Oak Creek school district is in Cornville. Cornville high school students attend Mingus Union High School in adjacent Cottonwood.

The Oak Creek Ranch School, a private boarding school, is in Cornville.

== Notable people ==
- Musician Maynard James Keenan of Tool, A Perfect Circle, and Puscifier.
- Senator John McCain had a vacation home, Hidden Valley Ranch, on Oak Creek, near Page Springs.
- Sculptor John Henry Waddell had a studio in Cornville until his death in 2019.

== Gallery ==
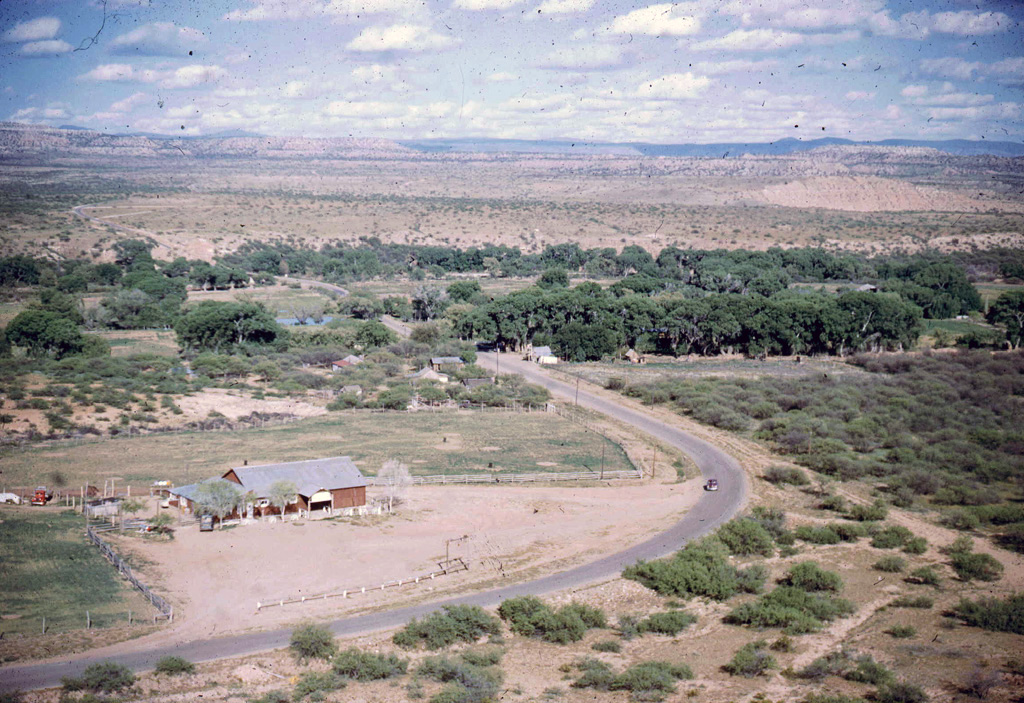
Cornville center, 1952

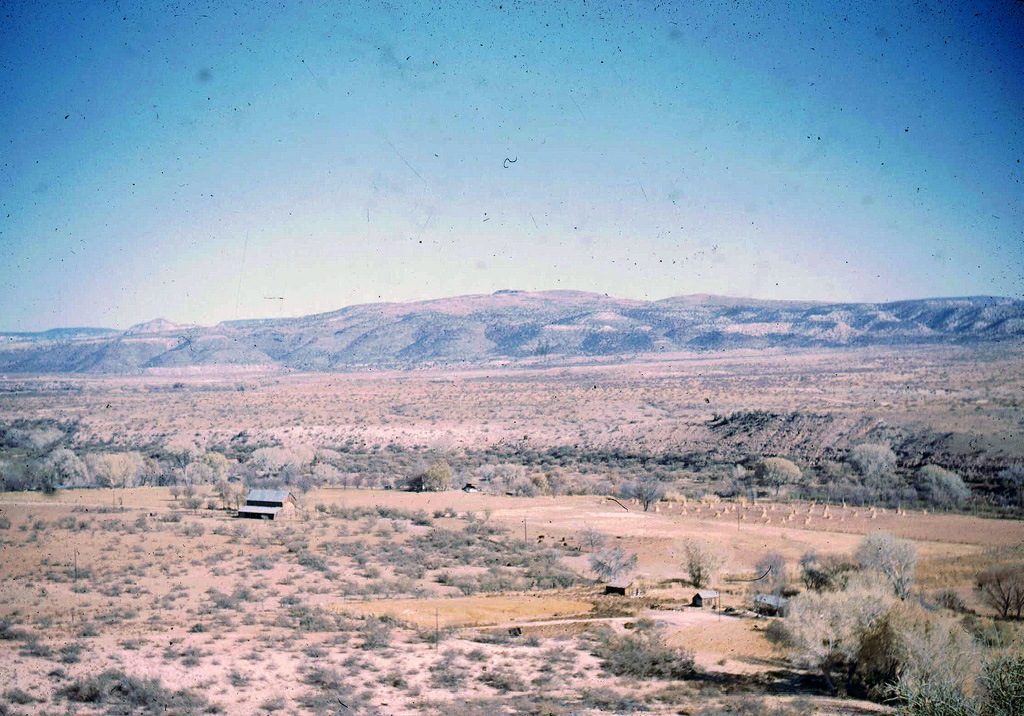
Southern Cornville ranches and farms, 1950

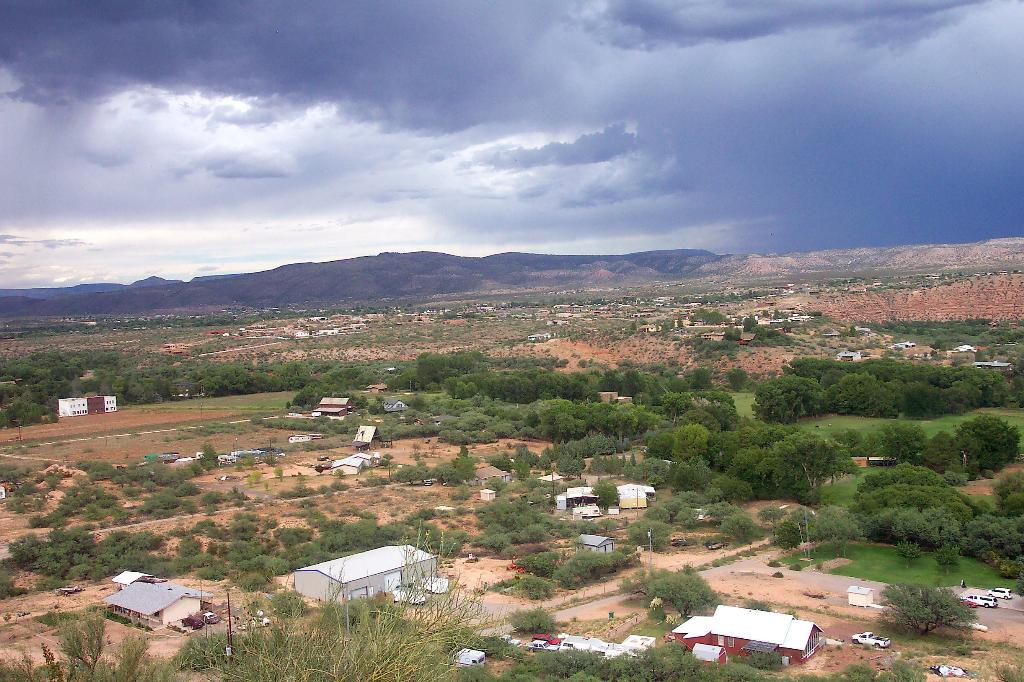
Southern Cornville from Loy Hill, 2009

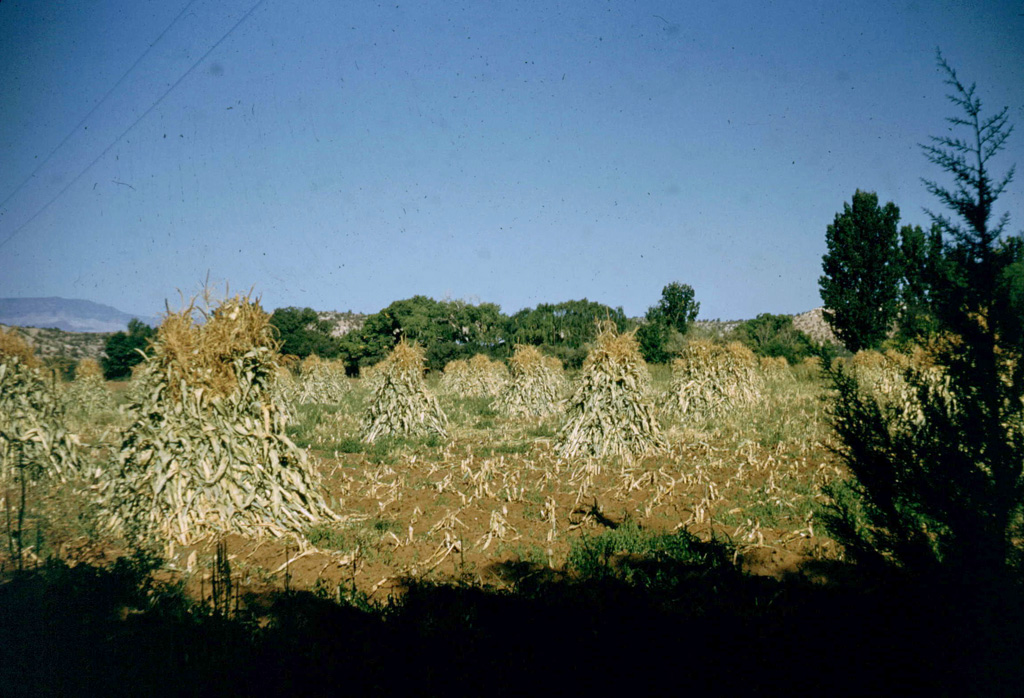
Cornville "corn", 1956
