= Kokopelli Winery =

Winery in Maricopa County, Arizona

- Location: Willcox, Arizona, United States
- Appellation: Arizona
- Founded: 1991
- First vintage: 1994
- Known for: Sweet Lucy
- Distribution: AZ Wine Distributors
- Tasting: By appointment
- Website: http://www.kokopelliwinery.net/

Kokopelli Winery & Bistro is a winery in Arizona, United States. It is one of the largest wineries in the state of Arizona.

== History ==
The winery planted its first grapes in 1991 on land about 20 miles north of Willcox, Arizona, first harvested in 1994, and opened in 1995. The winery was founded by Don and Carol Michella, and Herve and Florent Lescombes. Herve Lescombes was a sixth generation winemaker, with a family history of making wine in France and North Africa. It became Arizona's largest winery in 1995, producing over 5,400 cases that year.

Its first winery location was in Chandler (part of the Phoenix metropolitan area), and it opened its second location and restaurant in Surprise in the summer of 2008.

Kokopelli wines have won multiple awards in regional wine competitions.

== See also ==
- Arizona wine
