= Sonoita AVA =

American Viticultural Area in Arizona

Coordinates: 31°37′33″N 110°32′52″W

Sonoita
- Wine region
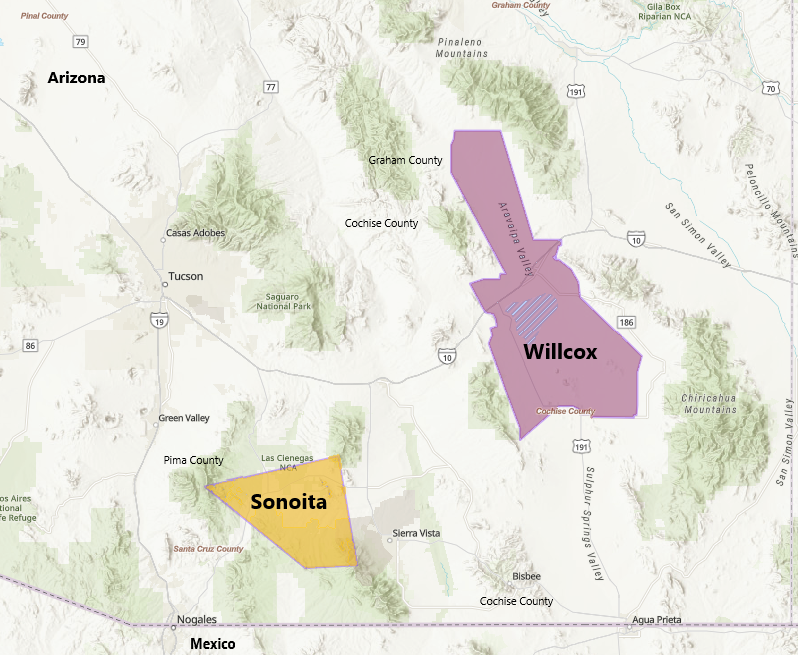
- Type: American Viticultural Area
- Year established: 1984
- Years of wine industry: 51
- Country: United States
- Part of: Arizona
- Other regions in Arizona: Willcox AVA, Verde Valley AVA
- Growing season: 200 days
- Climate region: Region V
- Heat units: 4,918 GDD units
- Precipitation (annual average): 20 in (510 mm)
- Soil conditions: Limestone parent material with igneous rock, quartzite, schist, granite, gneiss and caliche, as well as igneous and metamorphic rock
- Total area: 208,000 acres (325 sq mi)
- Size of planted vineyards: 229 acres (93 ha)
- No. of vineyards: 18
- Grapes produced: Aglianico, Albarino,Counoise,Cabernet Franc, Cabernet Sauvignon, Chardonnay, Grenache, Malvasia, Marsanne, Merlot, Mission, Montepulciano, Mourvèdre, Petite Sirah, Petit Manseng, Pinot Noir, Riesling, Sagrantino, Sangiovese, Sauvignon Blanc, Syrah, Tannat, Tempranillo, Vermentino, Viognier, Zinfandel
- No. of wineries: 22

Sonoita (/So-noi-ta/ so-NOY-ta) is an American Viticultural Area (AVA) located in southeastern Arizona adjacent to the Mexican border and south of the city of Tucson. It was established as the nation's 71^{st} and Arizona's initial appellation on October 25, 1984 by the Bureau of Alcohol, Tobacco and Firearms (ATF), Treasury after reviewing a petition submitted by Mr. A. Blake Brophy, General Partner of the Babacomari Ranch Company, on behalf of himself and local vintners proposing an viticultural area to be known as "Sonoita."
The Babacomari Ranch, an Arizona Limited Partnership, is a major landowner in the Sonoita Basin since 1975. It has been cooperating with the University of Arizona in experiments for the growing of vitis vinifera and the making of wines.

The viticultural area encompasses approximately 208,000 acres (325 sq mi) located in southernmost Santa Cruz County adjacent to the Mexican border. The AVA's northern and eastern boundaries also expands across portions of Cochise and Pima Counties. There was about 40 acres (16 ha) of cultivation in 1984 with future plans for 360 planted acres (146 ha) and a winery under construction. The reason for proposing the AVA name as "Sonoita" in the petition is because the area encircles the town of Sonoita which is centrally located and the site of the Santa Cruz County Fair. Nogales, to the south, is the county seat of Santa Cruz County.

The Sonoita viticultural area is a basin surrounded by four highly visible and strategically located topographical features: Mount Wrightson Peak in the Santa Rita Mountains on the west, Lookout Knob in the Canelo Hills to the south, Miller Peak in the Huachuca Mountains toward the east, and Granite Peak in the Whetstone Mountains to the north. Its vineyards are 4,500 to 5,000 feet (1,400 to 1,500 m) above sea level and some of the most elevated in North America. The soil is alluvial fans of gravelly loam that retains scarce water well.

== History ==
Historically, the name, Sonoita Basin, is derived from a "visita" established in 1691 by the missionary-explorer, Father Eusebio Francisco Kino. At that time, the name given to this small settlement of Sobaipuri Indians was "Los Santos Reyes de Sonoita." The area was slow to develop, primarily because it was in the center of Apache controlled land. The Gadsden Purchase of 1853 secured this territory for the United States. The name is retained today by the only viable community in the basin, the town of Sonoita, located in its western portion.

Dr. Gordon Dutt, founder and original winemaker at Sonoita Vineyards and soil scientist emeritus from the University of Arizona, along with Blake Brophy established the first experimental vineyard on the Ignacio de Babacomari Ranch in Southern Arizona in 1973.
The results of their tests were very compelling. Dr. Dutt, expected the grapes for red wine to bleach in the intense Arizona sun and produce wines with poor color and low acidity. Skepticism and even ridicule from farmers and academics also presumed the scorching heat and blazing sun would make winemaking impossible. Even wine distributors and retailers felt the pursuit was folly. However, much to Dutt's delight, the results were quite the opposite, resulting in red wines with brilliant color and acidity. Dr. Dutt attributes much of that success to the soil found in the area.

"This part of Arizona is a lot different than most folks imagine–we're at an altitude of 5,000 ft., set in rolling grasslands dotted with white oak, and the soil is nearly identical to that of Burgundy, France. You will find the results of our efforts, and what great terra Rosa (red clay) soil can produce in our estate bottled wines." Dr. Gordon R Dutt

Following his experimental success, Dr. Dutt planted Arizona's first commercial vineyard in 1979 and opened the winery in 1983. Starting with an annual production of 300 US gallons (1,100 L), Sonoita Vineyards is now producing over 7,000 US gal (26,000 L) per year. Overlooking 25 acres (10 ha) of vines, the winery is located at the top of a scenic hill three miles (4.8 km) south of Elgin, Arizona. The varieties grown on the estate today are Sauvignon Blanc, Cabernet Sauvignon, Merlot, Pinot Noir, Mission, Sangiovese, Syrah, Petite Sirah, and Tannat.

== Terroir ==
=== Topography ===
Topographically, the Sonoita AVA is separated from the surrounding areas by three major mountain ranges: The Santa Rita Mountains, the Huachuca Mountains, and the Whetstone Mountains. These mountains rise from 2,500 to 4,500 feet (760–1,370 m) above the floor of the viticultural area. The "old-timers" used to call the area "Sonoita Valley," because it resembles a valley in appearance. But geologically, the area is technically a basin rather than a valley, because it comprises the headwaters for three distinct drainages: Sonoita Creek to the south, Ciénega Creek to the north, and the Babocomari River to the east. Whereas, in technical geological terms, a "valley" is only a single drainage. The most obvious geographical distinction to the area is that, in its native state, it is classified as "high desert grassland," while the surrounding terrain is either mountain or woody-shrub desert. The boundaries of the Sonoita viticultural area may be found on seven U.S.G.S. quadrangle maps in Benson, Fort Huachuca, Sunnyside, Elgin, Lochiel, Mount Wrightson and Empire Mountains.

=== Climate ===
Sonoita AVA benefits with great soil and a cooler elevation yet, growers in the area face the same weather-related dangers any other region experiences, although to a greater degree of unpredictability. Extreme conditions can wreak havoc with little warning. Excessive heat, lightning storms, hail, and severe winter cold are threats to be managed. The monsoon season takes place from July to September and is responsible for providing a lot of the 20 in (510 mm) of annual rainfall the region receives. Because the region enjoys soils that drain well, a sudden deluge or two doesn't pose any real danger to the vines. If these storms also bring hail, however, the possibility of destruction goes way up.
Most of the region's 200 day growing season, between April 1 and October 31, has an average temperature between 66 and 70 °F (19–21 °C). Some areas at the far western and eastern borders experience slightly higher temperature averages, between 70 and 75 °F (21–24 °C). Sonoita's growing degree-day measurements is 4,918, Region V on the Winkler scale. Due to its climate, Sonoita musts have moderate to high acidity (0.7 to 1.0 g/100 ml), pH's between 3.1 and 3.6, and produce highly pigmented red wines. The USDA plant hardiness zones are 7b to 8b.

=== Soils ===
Soils in the area that are suitable for wine-grape production include the White House-Bernardino-Hathaway and the Caralumpi-Hathaway associations. The ancient sea floor left behind the rocky, high-pH soil which forces the grapes to struggle more and results in added complexity. Limestone is a known parent material in southwestern and northeastern parts of the Sonoita AVA. Igneous rock, quartzite, schist, granite, gneiss and caliche, as well as igneous and metamorphic rock also occur in northeastern areas. Parent material is the type of bedrock from which soil forms. As a component of vineyard soils, it influences water infiltration, storage, and drainage, erodibility, pH, nutrient availability, and heat absorption, which affect root, canopy, and fruit growth. Runoff is slow and the hazard of erosion is slight. The soils have moderate to high available water capacity and historically the land has been used for grazing livestock and wildlife.

== Viticulture ==
In 1970, Dr. Gordon Dutt, soil scientist at the University of Arizona, proposed growing grapes and producing wine in southwest Arizona. The idea was initially met with skepticism and even ridicule from farmers and academics who presumed the scorching heat and blazing sun would make wine-making impossible. Even wine distributors and retailers felt the pursuit was folly. He had reason to believe it was possible, however. Other parts of Arizona had succeeded in wine production when the Spanish inhabited the area more than 300 years prior, thriving until Prohibition in the 1920s. He felt the southeastern high desert land was similarly capable despite the assumptions to the contrary.

Dr. Dutt collaborated on a water conservation research project during the 1970s to prove his theory. The goal was to determine if regional crops could be sufficiently watered solely using rainfall influenced by ground contours and terraces. They planted experimental vineyards around the state, notably on the Babacomari Ranch near Sonoita. When the findings were presented in 1980, they confirmed the viability of wine-making southeast of Tucson. It was called the Four Corners Report, and it concluded the region could produce quality vintage wines from the classic vitus vinifera grapes used in California and other wine production regions, comparing the conditions to Sonoma. That same year, Robert Webb opened Arizona's first commercial winery using California-sourced grapes. The oldest commercial vineyard in Arizona, Sonoita Vineyards was started in 1974 and now includes over 30 acres (12 ha) of vines. In 1981, the Arizona Wine Growers Association was established, and in 1983 Sonoita Vineyard's bonded winery opened producing wines using locally-grown grapes. Later that year, Sonoita achieved its AVA status.
