= Maynard James Keenan =

American singer (born 1964)

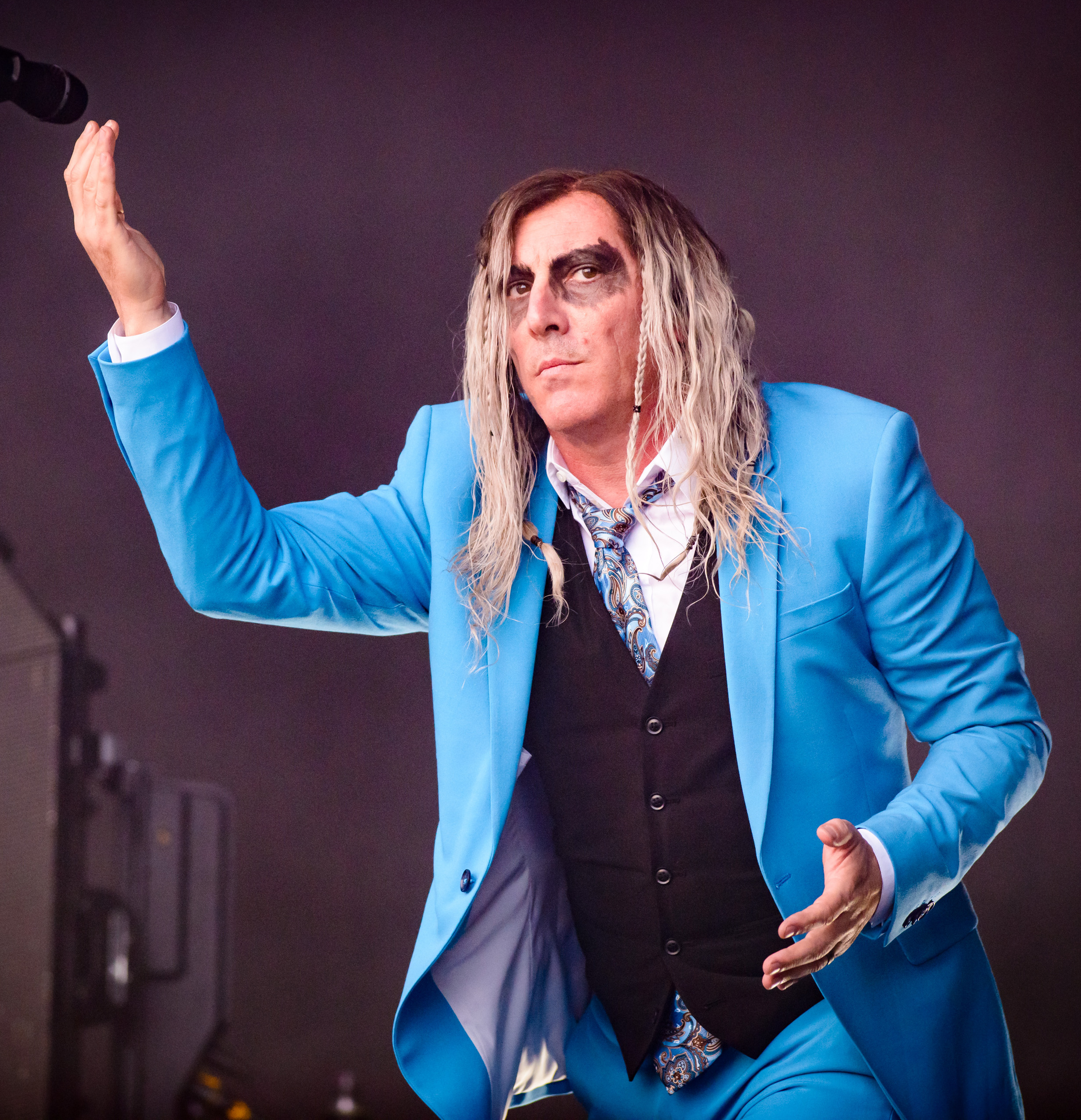
- Keenan performing with A Perfect Circle in 2018

Background information
- Born: James Herbert Keenan; April 17, 1964 (age 62); Akron, Ohio, U.S.
- Genres: Alternative metal; art rock; progressive metal; alternative rock
- Occupations: Singer; songwriter; record producer; winemaker
- Years active: 1986–present
- Member of: Tool; A Perfect Circle; Puscifer
- Formerly of: TexA.N.S.; Children of the Anachronistic Dynasty; Green Jellÿ; Tapeworm
- Website: maynardjameskeenan.com

Maynard James Keenan (born James Herbert Keenan; April 17, 1964) is an American musician who is the vocalist of the rock bands Tool, A Perfect Circle, and Puscifer.

Maynard James Keenan was born and raised in Ohio and Michigan. After graduating from high school, he enlisted in the United States Army. Following his military service, Keenan attended the Kendall College of Art and Design in Grand Rapids, Michigan.

In 1988, Keenan relocated to Los Angeles, California, to pursue a career in interior design and set construction for film and television. Shortly after the move, Keenan co-founded the band Tool alongside guitarist Adam Jones. He has also ventured into acting, and owns Merkin Vineyards and Caduceus Cellars in Arizona, where he resides.

Since rising to fame, Keenan has been noted as a recluse, although he does emerge to support charitable causes and for the occasional interview.

== Early life ==
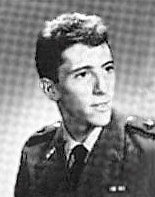
Keenan's photo in a West Point Prep School yearbook

James Herbert Keenan was born in Akron, Ohio, on April 17, 1964, the only child of Southern Baptists Judith Marie (née Dougherty) and Michael Van Keenan. He is of Irish and Italian descent. When his parents divorced in 1968, his father moved to Scottville, Michigan, and Keenan would only see him about once a year for the next 12 years. His mother remarried, and moved to Ravenna, Ohio bringing Keenan into an "intolerant and unworldly household" where his intelligence and creative expression would be stifled. His mother suffered a paralyzing subarachnoid hemorrhage due to a ruptured cerebral aneurysm in 1976 when Keenan was 11, and this incident would later serve as the inspiration for songs such as Tool's "Jimmy," "The Patient," and "Wings for Marie," "10,000 Days", as well as A Perfect Circle's "Judith." He attended Brown Junior High and then Ravenna High School. A few years later, his mother persuaded Keenan to live with his father in Scottville, which he considers "the best move [he] ever made". In 1982, he graduated from Mason County Central High School in Scottville, where he was a member of the wrestling team. His father was one of the coaches for the team and left coaching at the same time Keenan graduated in 1982.

Inspired by Bill Murray's performance in the 1981 comedy film Stripes, Keenan joined the United States Army, with the intention of having the G.I. Bill fund his dream of attending art school. By this point, he had lived in Kansas, Michigan, New Jersey, New York, Ohio, Oklahoma, and Texas. He initially served in the Army as a forward observer before studying at West Point Prep School from 1983 to 1984.

In addition to completing a rigorous math and English curriculum, Keenan wrestled, ran on the cross country team, and sang in the glee club. It was during his time in the military that he adopted the sobriquet "Maynard" on a whim, based on a fictional character he had created in high school. He declined an appointment to West Point and instead chose to pursue a music career because of his disillusionment with his colleagues' values and because he believed West Point would not tolerate his dissidence.

== Music career ==
=== Early bands ===
Upon completing his term of prep school, Keenan studied art at Kendall College of Art and Design in Grand Rapids, Michigan. From there he moved to Somerville, Massachusetts, where his love of animals led him to practice interior design for a Boston-area pet store. He was transferred to a store in Los Angeles, before he was quickly fired and began working in set construction. During the 1980s, Keenan played bass guitar for TexA.N.S. and sang for Children of the Anachronistic Dynasty, both independent bands. During this time, he wrote an early version of "Sober", later Tool's first successful single. He also (with future Tool bandmate Danny Carey) performed live and recorded with Green Jellÿ between 1990 and 1993, playing guitar and performing backup vocals as the voice of one of the pigs on the band's hit song "Three Little Pigs" on their debut album Cereal Killer, and appearing in the music video for "Slave Boy" on the band's follow-up LP 333. Around this time he also struck up a friendship with Tom Morello, who has credited Keenan with introducing him to Drop D tuning. Keenan spent time jamming with Morello and Brad Wilk, as did Zack de la Rocha: Morello and Wilk considered Keenan and de la Rocha as candidates for the vocalist with what would become Rage Against the Machine before deciding to ask the latter.

=== Tool ===
After moving to Los Angeles, Keenan met Adam Jones who had heard him singing on a demo in college. Impressed with Keenan's vocals, Jones suggested that they form a band. Reluctant, Keenan eventually agreed and, in 1990, Tool was formed. Fronted by Keenan, the eventual lineup included guitarist Jones; his neighbor, drummer Danny Carey; and bassist Paul D'Amour, who would later be replaced by Justin Chancellor.

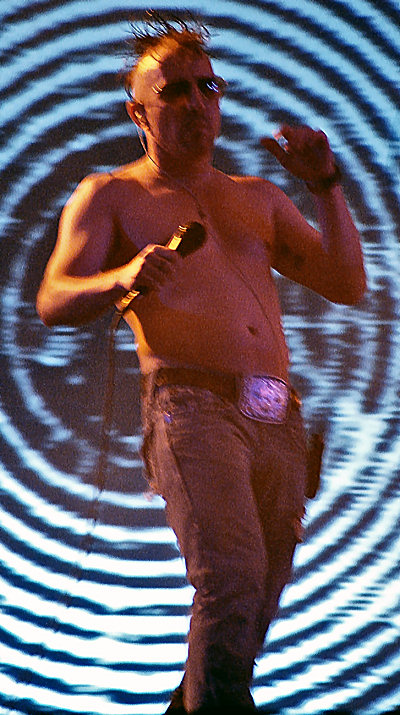
Keenan performing as a part of Tool in 2006

Tool signed to Zoo Entertainment in November 1991 and released the Opiate EP the following year. To support this release, the band toured with Fishbone and Rage Against the Machine. Shortly thereafter, Tool released their 1993 debut album, Undertow, in the United States. It was certified gold after just eight months, and platinum less than a year later. In 1994, the band released their single "Prison Sex" with a corresponding music video created and directed by Jones. The video was deemed "too graphic and offensive", and was withdrawn by MTV after a few airings due to "a symbolic dealing with the sensitive subject of child abuse".

In September 1996, the band released their second studio album, Ænima. The album was certified gold in ten weeks, achieved double platinum in ten months, and won the Grammy Award for Best Metal Performance in 1998. After the release of the album, Tool began a prolonged legal battle with their label, Volcano Records (formerly Zoo Records), over contract violations. Following this legal battle, which resulted in a new three-record deal, the members of Tool decided to take some time off. During the hiatus, Keenan went under the alias "Gaylord C." while collaborating with Tim Alexander of Primus and Mike Bordin of Faith No More on "Choked", a track on the 1997 drumming compilation Flyin' Traps.

The band members were outspokenly critical of peer-to-peer file sharing networks, due to the negative financial effect on artists dependent on success in record sales. During an interview with NY Rock in 2000, Keenan stated, "I think there are a lot of other industries out there that might deserve being destroyed. The ones who get hurt by MP3s are not so much companies or the business, but the artists, people who are trying to write songs."

Five years after the release of Ænima, Tool announced a new album, Systema Encéphale, with a 12-song track list in January 2001. A month later, the band revealed that the new album was titled Lateralus and that the previous announcement had been a ruse. The album was released in May 2001 to positive reviews. Known for his "dark, intelligent, compelling, and unexpected lyrical twists", Keenan was acclaimed for his songwriting on the album, in which he "doesn't cross the line from darkness to ugliness ... as often as he has in the past". In an interview with NY Rock, Keenan explained, "Everything we release with Tool is inspired by our music. It doesn't matter if it is a video or if its lyrics. The lyrics for "Schism" are nothing more than my interpretation of the music." The album became a worldwide success, reaching No. 1 on the U.S. Billboard 200 albums chart in its debut week, and Tool received their second Grammy Award for the best metal performance of 2001 for "Schism". In 2002, Keenan recorded a song called "Fallen" with Thirty Seconds to Mars that was released on the band's self-titled debut album.

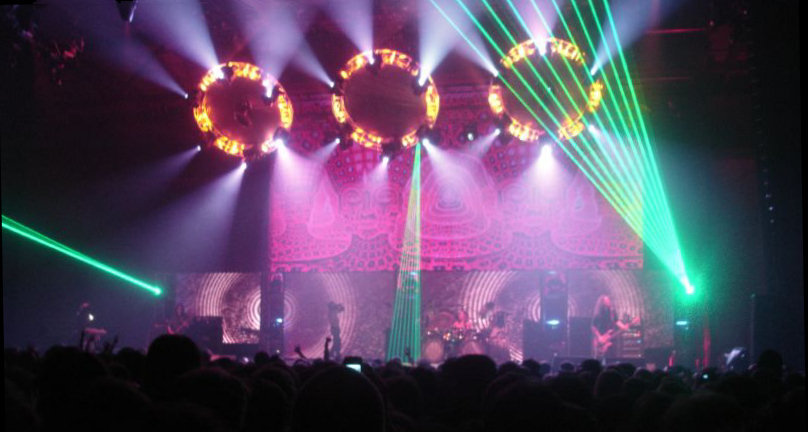
Keenan performing with Tool on December 12, 2006

15 years after the band's formation, Tool had acquired what Dan Epstein of Revolver described as a devoted "cult" following, and in May 2006 the band released 10,000 Days, an album in which Keenan sang about more personal issues in contrast to previous attempts to inspire change. His mother, who inspired the song "Jimmy" on Ænima, also served as the inspiration for "Jambi", and the two-part song "Wings for Marie" and "10,000 Days (Wings for Marie, Pt 2)", which deals with her 2003 death after 27 years, or around 10,000 days, of suffering. The album sold 564,000 copies in its opening week in the U.S. and was No. 1 on the Billboard 200 charts. However, 10,000 Days was received less favorably by critics than its predecessor Lateralus had been.

Following 10,000 Days, Tool had one album remaining to fulfill the obligation of its record contract. Over the course of the following years, the band slowly made progress towards its fifth studio release. Tool has worked around Keenan and his side projects since 1999, starting with the creation of A Perfect Circle, which has led to several years between projects. Regarding the future of Tool, Keenan stated in a 2007 interview with Spin, "We'll make music together until one of us is dead."

On March 24, 2009, a summer tour was announced on Tool's website, and in a March 26 press release Tool was confirmed as a headliner for the second annual Mile High Music Festival in Commerce City, Colorado, with Widespread Panic and The Fray. Tool also headlined Lollapalooza 2009 in Chicago, Illinois.

On August 7, 2019, Tool released the title track for Fear Inoculum across all streaming services. At the 62nd Grammy Awards, the band won Best Metal Performance, for the track "7empest" from the album.

=== A Perfect Circle ===
They keep going, "Are you working on another Tool album?" I'm like a mother on a table. I'm, like, giving birth to a baby, and you're asking me if I'm going to have another baby. Not right now, probably. Don't really feel like having sex right now, I'm having a fucking baby. I'm out here busting my ass; we're working hard on this. This is our new child; we're nurturing it, developing it and showing it to the world.

— Maynard James Keenan (2004)

During Tool's post-Ænima hiatus to deal with their legal issues, Keenan began working with Billy Howerdel, Tool's guitar tech through the Ænima tour, on a different project. The supergroup they formed, A Perfect Circle, began performing in 1999 and released its first album Mer de Noms in 2000. They released a successful follow-up in 2003 titled Thirteenth Step, a reference to twelve-step programs (many of the songs were written from the perspective of recovery). Both albums were eventually certified platinum. Their subsequent 2004 album, eMOTIVe, was primarily composed of covers, except for the singles "Counting Bodies Like Sheep to the Rhythm of the War Drums"—a song inspired by "Pet" that was originally released on Thirteenth Step—and "Passive". Keenan later characterized the record as a political album with which he "tested the waters" and was subsequently "crucified" for it because of the content. It was certified gold the month after its release. That same year they released the DVD and CD set entitled aMotion, which was certified platinum within a month of its release.

Howerdel reported in a May 2006 interview with MTV that the supergroup's work was concluded for the time being. After more than two years since the band's last release, Keenan was asked about the status of A Perfect Circle during an interview with Revolver. He stated:

The real problem with running Tool and A Perfect Circle at the same time was they both operate the same way. They're both live touring bands with a label, still working under the old contract mentality. So I thought it was time to let A Perfect Circle go for now and let Billy explore himself. It's tough for a guy who went from being a guitar tech [for Tool] to being in a band with a pretentious, famous singer and having to live in that shadow. It was important for Billy to go and do his own thing and really explore his own sound and let people hear what he has to say and how he would do it on his own, and then we'll get back and do some A Perfect Circle stuff.

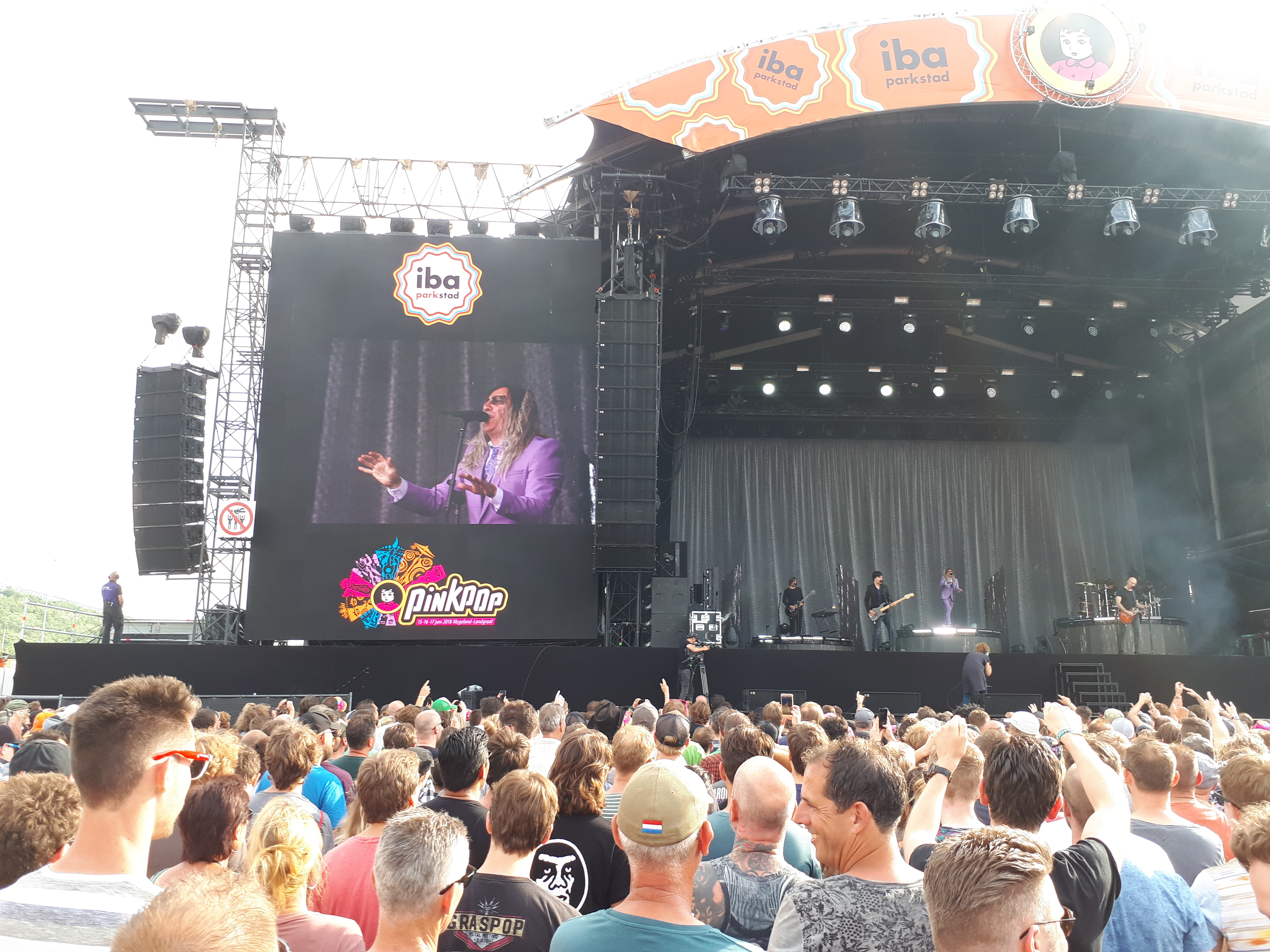
A Perfect Circle performing in 2018

When asked, in an interview for Spin that same month, about the possibility of another A Perfect Circle album, Keenan stated, "Maybe, someday, a song on a soundtrack. But an album? No." A year later, on December 9, 2008, blabbermouth.net reported that Keenan had announced on The Pulse of Radio that he and Howerdel have been writing new music for A Perfect Circle. Keenan also said that the band has no plans to resume full-scale touring, or even to write and record a new album. Instead, they will focus on "one or two songs at a time", which will most likely be released via the Internet.

However, in November 2010, the band returned from a nearly six-and-a-half-year hiatus with a 14-show tour in the western US. Touring resumed in May 2011 with a North American tour across the US and Canada that wrapped up at the end of August. The band performed only once in 2012 with a show of December 29 in Las Vegas, followed by a five-show Australian tour and a three-show South American tour in early 2013.

=== Puscifer ===
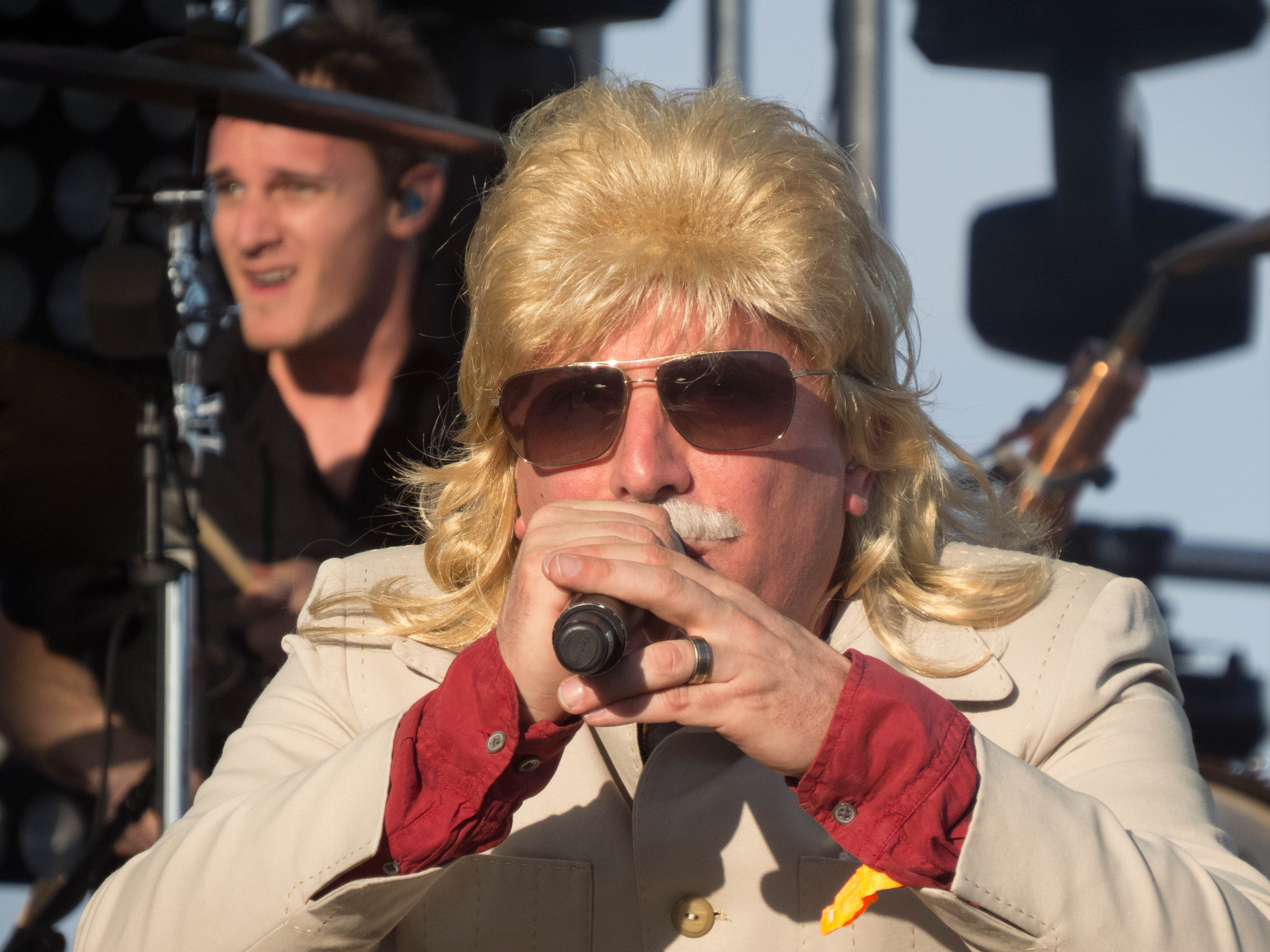
Keenan in costume at a Puscifer concert

In 2003, Keenan surfaced under the name "Puscifer" for the song "REV 22:20" on the Underworld film soundtrack. Puscifer was once advertised as a side project with Danny Lohner, who had formerly performed live with Nine Inch Nails, but has since been "formed as a manifestation of [Keenan's] creative subconscious"—interpreted to mean that the name is now a pseudonym for his solo work. Keenan has stated that it is "a premiere improvisational hardcore band", and his "catch-all, stream of consciousness, anything goes, etc." project. When comparing the project to Tool in an interview with Rolling Stone, Keenan described it as his "attempt to make music to inspire people. ... This is definitely not thinking man's music, but groove-oriented music that makes you feel good." In a later interview with Artistdirect, Keenan said that he did not want the lyrics to be puzzles. He wanted the complexity to be in the music, stating, "that's the part that gets under your skin and makes you feel good."

In 2006, Puscifer contributed the song "The Undertaker (Renholder Mix)" to the soundtrack of Underworld: Evolution, where "Renholder", a moniker for Danny Lohner created by the members of A Perfect Circle, is the reversal of "Re: D Lohner". Keenan financed and released the project's first studio album, "V" Is for Vagina, in October 2007. Created in a tour bus, in several hotel rooms, and in various studios around the country while Keenan toured with Tool, the album is a radical departure from Keenan's contributions in Tool and A Perfect Circle. Tim Alexander, best known as the drummer for the rock band Primus, was a guest musician on the album. He called Puscifer "trancy and hypnotic" and a "total 180 from Tool". The record was criticized as unfocused and lacking in the passion and intelligence present in Keenan's previous work.

In September 2008, Keenan updated the puscifer.com blog, revealing that the first ever Puscifer store would be opening "hopefully" by October 1 in Jerome, Arizona. Occupying a small space above a tattoo parlor, the store opened on October 3, 2008.

On February 13–15, 2009, Keenan debuted Puscifer at the Pearl Concert Theater in Palms Casino Resort in Paradise, Nevada, with a cabaret-style show. In an interview with the Los Angeles Times, Keenan stated "we didn't really have any clue what to call it, so we just kind of called it cabaret." Keenan—who has had previous experience with this type of entertainment, having fronted a similar show in Los Angeles before achieving fame with Tool—went on to add that "you just can't really describe it, you just have to see it, then it makes sense." Featuring an ever-changing lineup of artists including Milla Jovovich and Tim Alexander, the show was originally said to have a long-term residency at the Pearl; however, Keenan later revealed that it was to be only a two-show performance.

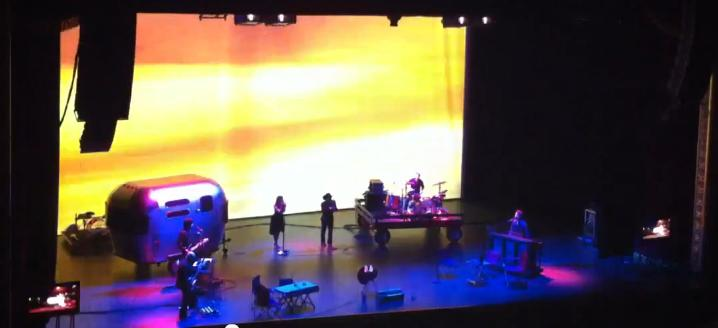
Puscifer performing in 2011

Puscifer continued to perform with a revolving lineup throughout 2009 at venues around the Southwest. However, in a November 2009 interview, Keenan stated: "Efforts to confine our beloved enigma to the Southwestern United States have been thwarted. We are compelled beyond all reason to bring the noise Eastward and share our special sauce. Although authorities suggest you be prepared for any and all possibilities, we simply suggest you arrive happy and hungry."

In October 2011, Puscifer issued their second album, Conditions of My Parole. It received generally favorable reviews on Metacritic as well as a positive review from Allmusic's Gregory Heaney, who described it as "a fine piece of cold weather headphone music". This was followed by the February 2013 release of Donkey Punch the Night an EP that includes covers of "Bohemian Rhapsody" by Queen and "Balls to the Wall" by Accept. It received mixed reviews, resulting in a Metacritic rating of 62%. The project has since published the albums Money Shot (2015), Existential Reckoning (2020), and Normal Isn't (2026), as well as a slew of remix albums, EPs, and live recordings.

== Writing and performance style ==
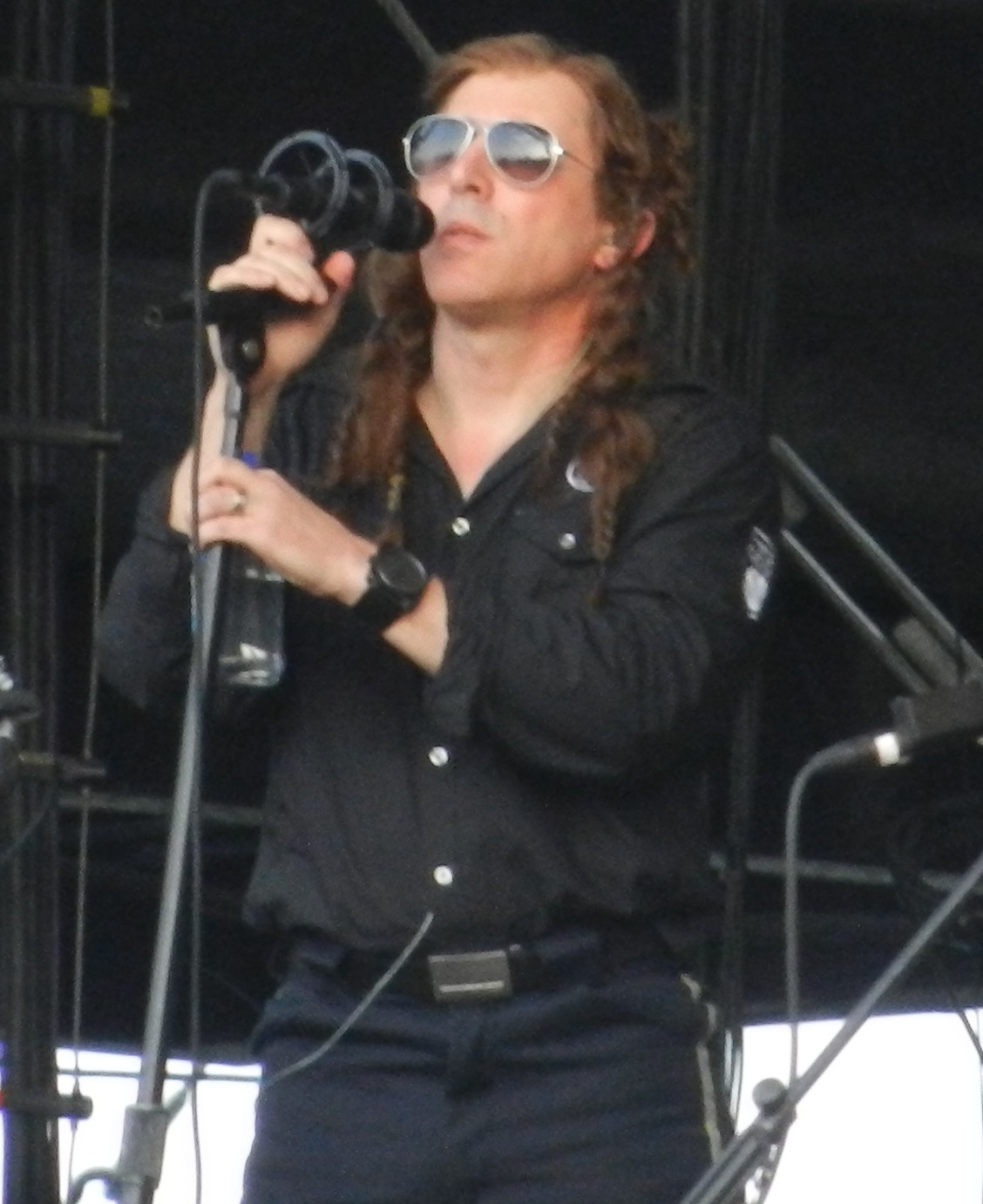
Keenan at Lollapalooza 2011

A primary purpose of Keenan's lyrics for Tool involves a desire to connect with the listeners on a personal level, encouraging them to look within themselves for self-identity, understanding and reflection. Tool did not include lyrics with any releases until Fear Inoculum, because Keenan felt that most people will fail to see beyond the surface of their meaning. However, after each release Keenan has eventually published his typed lyrics online via the semi-official fansite, with the exception of "Lateralus", which was published on the official Tool website.

Some lyrics in "Lateralus" were written to correspond to an arrangement of the Fibonacci numbers. In "Jambi", the metrical foot iamb is used. Keenan's lyrics on Ænima and Lateralus focused on philosophy and spirituality—specific subjects range from evolution and Jungian psychology in "Forty-Six & 2" and transcendence in "Lateralus".

In live performances with Tool, Keenan has often been situated on a platform towards the rear of the stage, without a spotlight, facing the backdrop rather than the audience. Keenan claims this allows him to better take cues from bandmates. Breckinridge Haggerty, the band's live video director, says that the dark spaces on stage "are mostly for Maynard". He explains, "a lot of the songs are a personal journey for him and he has a hard time with the glare of the lights when he's trying to reproduce these emotions for the audience. He needs a bit of personal space, and he feels more comfortable in the shadows."

An exception, which surprised even devout Tool fans, occurred when a fan climbed on stage and attempted to hug Keenan during the band's performance of "Pushit". After dropping the fan to the ground with a gentle hip toss, Keenan, continuing to sing, wrapped himself around the man's back into a rear naked choke. He held the man without actually constricting his neck, allowing him to raise his fist in celebration. Keenan eventually turned the man to his stomach and sat on his back, where he stayed for "an uncomfortably long period of time." His appearance with Tool has included the Mohawk hairstyle, wigs, Kabuki masks, bras, tights, and his entire body in blue paint. This is contrasted with a variety of long haired wigs while performing with or promoting A Perfect Circle.

Describing Keenan's contribution to Tool and A Perfect Circle, The New York Times wrote that "both groups rely on Mr. Keenan's ability to dignify emotions like lust, anger and disgust, the honey in his voice adding a touch of profundity". He ranked No. 21 in Hit Parader's 2006 list of "Heavy Metal's All-Time Top 100 Vocalists", and his style of singing has been considered influential to Pete Loeffler of Chevelle and Jared Leto of Thirty Seconds to Mars. He has been described as a baritone, and reportedly has a range of 4 octaves (G1-G5).

== Comedy and acting ==
Keenan is featured in several segments of Mr. Show, most notably in the Ronnie Dobbs sketch presented in the first season in which he plays the lead singer of the then-fictitious band "Puscifer". He also appears in episode 2.6, "The Velveteen Touch of a Dandy Fop". Later, Keenan sang on a track for the Mr. Show incarnation Run Ronnie Run, and appears in the "music video sex scene" on its DVD. Keenan appeared on the cover of the May/June 1999 issue of Pop Smear magazine, portraying Charles Manson as part of a photo essay, imitating a famous Life magazine portrait. He also appeared as Satan in the 2002 film Bikini Bandits and its 2004 sequel Bikini Bandits 2: Golden Rod. When asked in an interview which role was more difficult, Keenan responded, "Oh, Manson. He's a real person. People know what he looks like, how he talked. With Satan there's so much gray area."

In the mid-1990s, responding to requests for Tool to perform in benefit shows, Keenan created "Free Frances Bean" tee-shirts to represent his own platform. Frances's mother, Courtney Love, had previously referred to Keenan as a "media whore" to which he responded, "Isn't that great? I have the distinction of being called a media whore by Courtney Love." He said that after watching "the tornado that is her mother", he thought "Oh my God, how is Frances Bean gonna survive this insanity?" Although it was started as a simple joke, the T-shirts were soon in high demand and Keenan began giving them away.

On April 1, 2005, the official Tool website announced, as an April Fools' Day prank, that "Maynard has found Jesus" and would be abandoning the recording of the new album temporarily and possibly permanently. Kurt Loder of MTV contacted Keenan via email to ask for a confirmation and received a nonchalant confirmation. When Loder asked again, Keenan's response was simply "heh heh". On April 7, the official site revealed that it was a hoax. During an interview Keenan later stated, "It was April Fools'. If you fall for that on April Fools' Day, there's nothing I can do for you." He has been part of other April Fools' pranks related to Tool, including one in which he was said to be in critical condition after a tour bus accident.

Keenan made a cameo in the 2009 film Crank: High Voltage. In May 2015, Keenan made a cameo in an episode of Comedy Bang! Bang! as fictional punk musician Barf Edwards.

== Winemaking and other endeavors ==
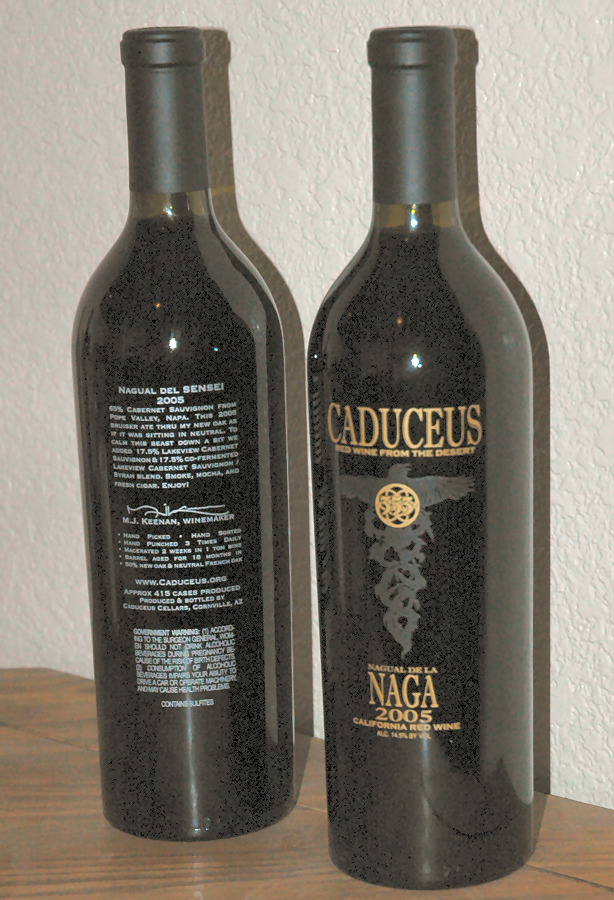
Caduceus Wine

In addition to a produce market in Cornville, Arizona; Keenan, whose grandparents and great-uncle made wine in Northern Italy, owns Merkin Vineyards and Caduceus Cellars, based in the unincorporated area of Page Springs/Cornville, Arizona, southwest of Sedona, where he resides. While the winery is named after an ancient symbol for commerce (caduceus), the vineyard is named after a pubic wig (merkin). He is also a partner of Stronghold Vineyards, "an 80-acre (32 ha) site dedicated to producing affordable wines in the state", located in the small, unincorporated area known as Kansas Settlement in Sulfur Springs Valley, Arizona.

Keenan's mother died in 2003, at the age of 59, due to complications from an aneurysm. Following her death, he scattered her ashes across one of his vineyards, and later named one of his wines after her, honoring her memory with his Cabernet Sauvignon "Nagual del Judith".

His previous wines were named after relatives of the Chiricahua Apache chief Cochise who lived in the area where the vineyard is located, and were produced at Page Springs Cellars, owned by Keenan's business partner. While those wines used some fruits imported from California, "Nagual del Judith" was the first made entirely from Keenan's own vineyard. Keenan was also a part-owner of Cobras & Matadors, an LA restaurant run by Steven Arroyo until 2012.

During the fall season of 2008, Keenan and his Stronghold Vineyards partner Eric Glomski promoted his wine with signing sessions at Whole Foods Markets in California and Nevada. The tour continued in 2009 with sessions in Texas kicking off in March, and appearances scheduled during Tool's 2009 summer tour in Florida, Massachusetts, and New Jersey. In July 2009, Keenan opened an organic market which features a tasting room for his Arizona wines as well as a food court.

Keenan is featured in Blood Into Wine, a documentary co-produced by Moog filmmakers Ryan Page and Christopher Pomerenk that chronicles Keenan and Glomski's winemaking in the desert conditions of Arizona's Verde Valley. The film, which includes appearances from Tim & Eric, Patton Oswalt, and Milla Jovovich, was shown at the Noise Pop Festival on February 25, 2010.

The same festival also showed another documentary produced by Pomerenk, The Heart is a Drum Machine. It investigates why people create and listen to music, and features Keenan, Jason Schwartzman, Kurt Loder, Nic Harcourt, Juliette Lewis, and Elijah Wood.

Keenan's authorized biography, A Perfect Union of Contrary Things, was released on November 8, 2016.

== Philanthropy ==
Keenan performed at a 1997 benefit concert for RAINN (the Rape, Abuse & Incest National Network) organized by Tori Amos (who had often referred to Keenan as an unofficial brother). He is one of the notable performers for Axis of Justice, a non-profit organization that brings musicians, fans of music, and grassroots political organizations together to fight for social justice. In 2004, Axis of Justice released Concert Series Volume 1. Included are two tracks featuring Keenan on vocals. The second track on the album, "(What's So Funny 'Bout) Peace, Love, and Understanding", was recorded live during Lollapalooza in Seattle, Washington on August 23, 2003. The first track, "Where the Streets Have No Name", was recorded live during the Axis of Justice Concert Series at The Avalon in Hollywood on July 19, 2004. In February 2005, Keenan appeared as a surprise vocalist at a Seattle benefit concert for victims of the 2004 earthquake and tsunami in southern Asia, performing with the partly reformed Alice in Chains, in place of the deceased vocalist Layne Staley, on the songs "Them Bones", "Man in the Box", and "Rooster".

== Personal life ==
Keenan has a son, Devo, who sang backing vocals on A Perfect Circle's Thirteenth Step, and was later credited as the cellist on Ashes Divide's Keep Telling Myself It's Alright. He also gave a solo cello performance for Keenan's 50th birthday celebration concert, "Cinquanta".

He relocated to Jerome, Arizona in 2012.

Two songs bear the name of Keenan's mother, Judith Marie: "Wings for Marie (Pt. 1)" by Tool and "Judith" by A Perfect Circle.

Keenan has a reputation for being reclusive and controlling of his public image. He dislikes the manner in which celebrities are worshipped, and at one point carried business cards with the name "Jesus H. Christ" printed on them. When dealing with stalkers, Keenan has resorted to using a paintball gun to run off trespassers from his property. Brazilian jiu-jitsu is one of Keenan's pursuits, as shown when he took down a fan who ran on stage in the middle of a performance and put them in a rear naked choke. He studied under Rickson Gracie. In November 2021, Keenan was promoted to brown belt in BJJ by 6th degree black belt Luis Heredia. In January 2024, he was promoted to black belt in the art.

It was announced in June 2010 that Keenan had proposed to girlfriend and Caduceus lab manager Lei Li. On September 10, 2012, Keenan wrote an article for the Phoenix New Times in which he made reference to his wife. On July 25, 2014, Keenan's wife gave birth to their daughter.

== Selected discography ==
With TexA.N.S.

- Live at Sons and Daughters Hall (1984)
- Never Again (1985)

With Children of the Anachronistic Dynasty

- Fingernails (1986)
- Dog.House (1987)

With Tool

- Undertow (1993)
- Ænima (1996)
- Lateralus (2001)
- 10,000 Days (2006)
- Fear Inoculum (2019)

With A Perfect Circle

- Mer de Noms (2000)
- Thirteenth Step (2003)
- Emotive (2004)
- Eat the Elephant (2018)

As Puscifer

- "V" Is for Vagina (2007)
- Conditions of My Parole (2011)
- Money Shot (2015)
- Existential Reckoning (2020)
- Normal Isn't (2026)

== See also ==
- List of celebrities who own wineries and vineyards
