= Spanish period in Arizona =

Between the years of 1539 and 1821, the Spanish Empire explored, colonized, and ruled over what is the state of Arizona in the United States.

== Spanish exploration ==
In 1539, Fray Marcos de Niza passed through what is now southeastern Arizona in search of the Seven Cities of Cibola. In 1540, Francisco Vázquez de Coronado explored eastern Arizona also in search of the mythical cities.

== Missions ==
In 1691, the Jesuit missionary, Father Eusebio Francisco Kino travelled through the Pimería Alta, establishing missions to convert the natives to Christianity. Most of the missions founded by Kino were destroyed and/or abandoned because of native American attacks. Missions continued to be established in Arizona, but at a very slow pace. In 1768, the Spanish crown discontinued Jesuit missionary work in the Americas, and missionary work was continued under the Franciscans.

== Conflict with the natives ==
In the 18th century, many native tribes were attacking Spanish settlements in Arizona. To counter this, the Spanish Army built several presidios in northern New Spain. In 1751, the native Pima people revolted against the Spanish in the Pima Revolt, and over 100 settlers were killed and most of the remaining settlers fled in fear, leaving several missions abandoned. In 1752, Presidio San Ignacio de Tubac was built in what is now Tubac, Arizona. In 1775, Presidio San Agustín del Tucsón was built in what is now Tucson, Arizona. Multiple battles took place at Tucson between the Spanish and the Apache. In 1776, Presidio Santa Cruz de Terrenate was founded near what is now Tombstone, Arizona. Eventually, the Spanish made peace with the Apache, by giving them beef, blankets, and guns in return of them living in the establacimientos de paz (peace camps). Apaches who made peace with the Spanish were referred to as Apaches de paz (Apaches of Peace).

== Mining and ranching ==
In the late 18th century, the Spanish had made peace with the Apache, allowing the area to prosper. Mining began in the Arivaca area in search of silver and gold. The Spanish began giving large land grants in southeastern Arizona, which were turned into ranches (ranchos). In 1821, the Treaty of Córdoba was signed, ending the Mexican War of Independence and giving Mexico control over New Spain.
