= Association Kokopelli =

French non-profit organization

Association Kokopelli is a non-profit organization based in Le Mas d'Azil, France with small independent branches in Italy, United Kingdom, Belgium, Germany and Brazil. It was created in France in March 1999 by a group of people who have been involved since 1987 in the protection of biodiversity, medicinal plants and the production of organic seeds.

Its name reflects the Southwestern Native American fertility deity Kokopelli.

In 2008, the foundation was fined €35,000 for selling varieties of seeds not in the EU Common Catalogue.

== Development ==
In 2006, the association's turnover was around 800,000 euros. In 2015, the association's turnover reached 2.5 million euros, then 3.2 million euros in 2016.

In 2016, Kokopelli claims to have nearly 12,000 members and approximately 120,000 clients.

Based for more than ten years in Alès, in the Gard region, Kokopelli moved in August 2013 to Mas-d'Azil in Ariège.

In 2017, the association inaugurated its new 1,300 m2 headquarters, for an investment of 1.6 million euros, built with the support of local public authorities, including the Ariège departmental council, the Occitanie regional council, and the commune of Mas-d'Azil.

In June 2018, Dominique Guillet relinquished the presidency of the association in order to be able to "free his speech and his actions without committing Kokopelli" a reference to the sometimes polemical comments posted on his blog. His son, Ananda Guillet, was appointed by the board of directors to take over.
