= Lateralus =

- Digital cover. On physical formats, the cover art has a translucent insert that flips open to reveal the different layers of the human body.

Studio album by Tool
- Released: May 15, 2001
- Recorded: October 2000 – January 2001
- Studios: Cello (Hollywood); The Hook (Hollywood); Big Empty Space (Hollywood); The Lodge (Hollywood)
- Genres: Progressive metal; alternative metal; progressive rock; art rock
- Length: 78:53
- Label: Volcano
- Producers: Tool; David Bottrill

Tool chronology
Salival (2000)	Lateralus (2001)	10,000 Days (2006)

Singles from Lateralus
- 1. "Schism" Released: January 15, 2001; 2. "Parabola" Released: January 2002; 3. "Lateralus" Released: February 2002

Lateralus (/ˌlætəˈræləs/) is the third studio album by the American rock band Tool. It was released on May 15, 2001, through Volcano Entertainment. The album was recorded at Cello Studios in Hollywood and The Hook, Big Empty Space, and The Lodge, in North Hollywood, between October 2000 and January 2001. David Bottrill, who had produced the band's previous release Ænima, produced the album along with the band, and it became the last Tool album produced by Bottrill to date. On August 23, 2005, Lateralus was released as a limited edition two-picture-disc vinyl LP in a holographic gatefold package.

The album debuted at No. 1 on the Billboard 200 chart, selling more than 555,200 copies in its first week of release. It was certified triple platinum by the RIAA on April 15, 2021. On February 13, 2015, the album was certified Gold by the BPI. It was also certified double platinum in both Australia and Canada. The band won the Grammy Award for Best Metal Performance for the song "Schism" in 2002. Lateralus was ranked No. 123 on the Rock and Roll Hall of Fame's "Definitive 200" list.

== Background ==
Lateralus emerged after a four-year legal dispute with Tool's label, Volcano Entertainment. During those years, the band avoided writing new material.

In January 2001, the band announced that their new album's title would be Systema Encéphale and provided a 12-song track list with titles such as "Riverchrist", "Numbereft", "Encephatalis", "Musick", and "Coeliacus". File sharing networks such as Napster were flooded with bogus files bearing the titles' names. At the time, Tool's members were outspokenly critical of file-sharing networks in general due to the negative effect on artists that are dependent on success in record sales to continue their career. During an interview with NY Rock in 2000, lead singer Maynard James Keenan stated:

I think there are a lot of other industries out there that might deserve being destroyed. The ones who get hurt by MP3s are not so much companies or the business, but the artists, people who are trying to write songs.

A month later, the band revealed that the new album was actually titled Lateralus (supposedly a portmanteau of the leg muscle Vastus lateralis and the term lateral thinking) and that the name Systema Encéphale and the track list had been a ruse.

Lateralus and the corresponding tours would take Tool a step further toward art rock, and progressive rock territory, in contrast to the band's earlier material, which has often been labeled as alternative metal. The album has also been described as progressive metal. Rolling Stone wrote in an attempt to summarize the album that "Drums, bass and guitars move in jarring cycles of hyperhowl and near-silent death march ... The prolonged running times of most of Lateralus thirteen tracks are misleading; the entire album rolls and stomps with suitelike purpose." Joshua Klein of The A.V. Club in turn expressed his opinion that Lateralus, with its 79-minute running time and relatively complex and long songs—topped by the ten-and-a-half minute music video for "Parabola"—posed a challenge to fans and music programming alike. Drummer Danny Carey said, "The manufacturer would only guarantee us up to 79 minutes ... We thought we'd give them two seconds of breathing room." Carey aspired to create longer songs like those by artists he grew up listening to. The band had segues to place between songs, but had to cut out a lot during the mastering phase. The CD itself was mastered using HDCD technology.

Just as Salival was initially released with several errors on the track listing, early pressings of Lateralus had the ninth track incorrectly spelled as "Lateralis". The original title of "Reflection" was "Resolution" before being changed three months prior to the album's release.

The track listing is altered on the vinyl edition, with "Disposition" appearing at track 8. Because of the long running time, the double vinyl edition could not be released like the disc since the songs would not fit on each disc side in that order. By moving "Disposition" to an earlier point, the sides were balanced and could fit the material. This edit breaks the segue that occurs between "Disposition" and "Reflection", however, which, along with "Triad", are linked together on the tracklist.

Two of the singles from the album, "Parabola" and "Schism", are featured in the video game Guitar Hero World Tour.

The insert is translucent and flips open to reveal the different layers of the human body. Disguised in the brain matter on the final layer is the word "God". The artwork was done by artist Alex Grey, who would later design the 3D edition cover for the followup to Lateralus, 10,000 Days and a major part of the artwork for Tool's fifth studio album Fear Inoculum.

== Composition and content ==
Drummer Danny Carey sampled himself breathing through a tube to simulate the chanting of Buddhist monks for "Parabol", and banged piano strings for samples on "Reflection". "Faaip de Oiad" samples a recording of a 1997 call on Art Bell's radio program Coast to Coast AM. "Faaip de Oiad" is Enochian for The Voice of God.

"Disposition", "Reflection", and "Triad" form a sequence that has been performed in succession live with occasional help from various tourmates such as Mike Patton, Dave Lombardo, Buzz Osborne, Tricky, and members of Isis, Meshuggah, and King Crimson.

The title track, "Lateralus", incorporates the Fibonacci sequence. The theme of the song describes the desire of humans to explore and to expand for more knowledge and a deeper understanding of everything. The lyrics "spiral out" refer to this desire and also to the Fibonacci spiral, which is formed by creating and arranging squares for each number in the sequence's 1,1,2,3,5,8,... pattern, and drawing a curve that connects to two corners of each square. This would, allowed to continue onwards, theoretically create a never-ending and infinitely expanding spiral. Related to this, the song's main theme features successive time signatures 9/8, 8/8, and 7/8. The number 987 is the sixteenth integer of the Fibonacci sequence.

"Eon Blue Apocalypse" is an instrumental piece in-between "The Grudge" and "The Patient". The track "Mantra" is the slowed-down sound of Maynard James Keenan gently squeezing one of his cats.

In an interview with producer David Bottrill, he revealed that the lyrics for "Schism" were changed last minute because of Adam Jones thinking they were too close to home. The first version of the lyrics were, according to Bottrill, very explicitly about the building tensions between Maynard and Adam, and the band as a whole. Maynard changed them after a lengthy band meeting, to be more broadly applicable to relationships falling apart.

== Release and reception ==
Professional ratings
Aggregate scores
Source	Rating
Metacritic	75/100
Review scores
Source	Rating
AllMusic	4/5 stars
Entertainment Weekly	B−
Kerrang!	5/5 stars
Los Angeles Times	3.5/4 stars
NME	7/10
Pitchfork	1.9/10
Q	4/5 stars
Rolling Stone	4/5 stars
USA Today	3.5/4 stars
The Village Voice	C

Overall, Lateralus was met with generally favorable reviews by mainstream music critics upon its initial release. At Metacritic, which assigns a normalized rating out of 100 to reviews from critics, the album received an average score of 75, which indicates "generally favorable reviews", based on 15 reviews. Many of their responses mentioned the album's ambition and ability to confound listeners, such as Spin's Ryan Rayhil's summarization of it as a "monolithic puzzlebox". Rob Theakston reviewed the record for AllMusic, where he claimed that "Lateralus demands close listening from the first piece onward, as it becomes quickly apparent that this is not going to be an album one can listen to and accept at face value. Complex rhythm changes, haunting vocals, and an onslaught of changes in dynamics make this an album other so-called metal groups could learn from."

Terry Bezer praised Lateralus in a review for Drowned in Sound by comparing it to the band's previous album, Ænima, calling it "a more focused and cunning record than its predecessors that in many ways puts everything the band have formerly produced into perspective." David Fricke of Rolling Stone also measured the album up to earlier works from the band's oeuvre; "Tool have everything it takes to beat you senseless; they proved it on 1993's Undertow and their 1996 Grammy-winning beast, Ænima. Here, Tool go to extravagant lengths to drown you in sensation." In a review for Kerrang!, Dave Everly claimed "It's the most perfectly played, perfectly produced record you're likely to hear this or any other year" and that it was "one of the greatest albums you'll hear in your lifetime." Writing for NME, Andy Capper also approved of it; "Lateralus has added a little more colour to their palette of chanting, drumming and high drama. Singer Maynard James Keenan has been unaffected by the comparative tunefulness of his side project A Perfect Circle, while the stripped-down nature of the instrumentation means that Tool's innate heaviness shines out in a world of production tricks and dodges. There's no trickery—Tool's progressiveness is all their own work."

By contrast, in a review for Pitchfork, Brent DiCrescenzo claimed that, "With the early new century demanding 'opuses', Tool follows suit. The problem is, Tool defines 'opus' as taking their 'defining element' (wanking sludge) and stretching it out to the maximum digital capacity of a compact disc." In the Village Voice, Robert Christgau lambasted the album, calling it "meaning-mongering for the fantasy fiction set." The review published in Blender described the album as sounding like "Black Sabbath jamming with Genesis at the bottom of a coal shaft."

=== Commercial performance ===
The album was a commercial success in the United States, debuting at No. 1 on the U.S. Billboard 200 albums chart with over 555,200 copies sold in its first week of release, just ahead of Missy Elliott's Miss E... So Addictive and dethroning Destiny's Child's Survivor. On August 5, 2003, the album was certified double platinum by the RIAA. On April 30, 2010, the album was certified gold by the BPI for sales of 100,000 in the U.K. In addition, Lateralus was certified double platinum by the ARIA and MC.

=== Accolades ===
Tool received the 2002 Grammy Award for Best Metal Performance for the song "Schism". During the band's acceptance speech, drummer Danny Carey stated that he would like to thank his parents "for putting up with [him]", and bassist Justin Chancellor concluded, "I want to thank my dad for doing my mum."

Kludge ranked Lateralus at No. 2 on their list of top 10 albums of 2001. Kerrang! placed the album at No. 1 on their 2001 "Albums Of The Year" list. Q listed Lateralus as one of the best 50 albums of 2001.

The album continued to gain accolades in the years following its release. In 2016, Loudwire named Lateralus the No. 1 hard rock/metal album of the 21st century. The magazine also ranked it No. 6 on their "Top 25 Progressive Metal Albums of All Time." The album was ranked at No. 32 on Rolling Stone's 50 Greatest Prog Rock Albums of All Time list. Louder Sound placed the album at No. 33 on their Top 100 Prog Albums of All Time list.

Publications have also continued to praise the performances by the band members on the album. NutSie.com ranked the drumming performance by Danny Carey on the song "Ticks & Leeches" at No. 3 on their list of Top 100 Rock Drum Performances.

=== Special editions ===
A vinyl edition and two DVD singles from the album were released later. The "double vinyl four-picture disc" edition of Lateralus was first released as a limited autographed edition exclusively available to fan club members and publicly released on August 23, 2005. Two music videos were produced; one for "Schism" (with the short ambient segue "Mantra" at the beginning) and one for "Parabol/Parabola". These were subsequently released as two separate DVD singles on December 20, 2005, featuring remixes of the tracks by Lustmord.

== Track listing ==
All tracks are written by Danny Carey, Justin Chancellor, Maynard James Keenan, and Adam Jones.

No.	Title	Length
1.	"The Grudge"	8:36
2.	"Eon Blue Apocalypse" (instrumental)	1:04
3.	"The Patient"	7:14
4.	"Mantra" (instrumental)	1:12
5.	"Schism"	6:48
6.	"Parabol"	3:04
7.	"Parabola"	6:03
8.	"Ticks & Leeches"	8:10
9.	"Lateralus"	9:24
10.	"Disposition"	4:46
11.	"Reflection"	11:07
12.	"Triad" (instrumental – song ends at 6:32, followed by silence)	8:46
13.	"Faaip de Oiad"	2:39
Total length:		78:53

Note

- On vinyl editions of the album, "Disposition" is moved to track 8 between "Parabola" and "Ticks & Leeches".

== Personnel ==
=== Tool ===
- Maynard James Keenan – vocals
- Adam Jones – guitars
- Justin Chancellor – bass
- Danny Carey – drums, percussion, samples

=== Additional personnel ===
- Statik (Collide) – machines on "Triad"

=== Production ===
- Tool – production
- David Bottrill – production, engineering, mixing
- Vince DeFranco (Synesthesia) – neurocistance, engineering
- Adam Jones – art direction
- Alex Grey – illustrations
- Bob Ludwig – mastering

== Charts ==
Lateralus sold 555,000 copies in its first week, debuting at number one on the Billboard 200. As of July 7, 2010, Lateralus has sold 2,609,000 copies in the US. It is ranked number 123 on the Rock and Roll Hall of Fame's "Definitive 200" list.

=== Weekly charts ===
Weekly chart performance for Lateralus
Chart (2001)	Peak position
Australian Albums (ARIA)	1
Austrian Albums (Ö3 Austria)	9
Belgian Albums (Ultratop Flanders)	13
Belgian Albums (Ultratop Wallonia)	19
Canadian Albums (Billboard)	1
Danish Albums (Hitlisten)	12
Dutch Albums (Album Top 100)	7
Europe (European Top 100 Albums)	7
Finnish Albums (Suomen virallinen lista)	11
French Albums (SNEP)	21
German Albums (Offizielle Top 100)	5
Irish Albums (IRMA)	19
Italian Albums (FIMI)	22
New Zealand Albums (RMNZ)	2
Norwegian Albums (VG-lista)	2
Polish Albums (ZPAV)	1
Scottish Albums (Official Charts)	13
Spanish Albums (AFYVE)	23
Swedish Albums (Sverigetopplistan)	8
Swiss Albums (Schweizer Hitparade)	31
UK Albums (Official Charts)	16
US Billboard 200	1

Chart (2019)	Peak position
Portuguese Albums (AFP)	26
US Top Hard Rock Albums (Billboard)	2
US Top Rock Albums (Billboard)	2

=== Year-end charts ===
Year-end chart performance for Lateralus
Chart (2001)	Position
Australian Albums (ARIA)	35
Belgian Albums (Ultratop Flanders)	85
Canadian Albums (Nielsen SoundScan)	39
New Zealand Albums (RMNZ)	28
US Billboard 200	47

Chart (2002)	Position
Canadian Alternative Albums (Nielsen SoundScan)	115
Canadian Metal Albums (Nielsen SoundScan)	52

Chart (2019)	Position
US Top Rock Albums (Billboard)	74

=== Singles ===
Year	Song	Peak chart positions			
Year	Song	US	US Mod	US Main	NLD
2001	"Schism"	67	2	2	54
2001	"Parabola"	—	31	10	56
2002	"Lateralus"	—	18	14	—
"—" denotes releases that did not chart.

== Certifications ==
Region	Certification	Certified units/sales
Australia (ARIA)	2× Platinum	140,000^{‡}
Canada (Music Canada)	2× Platinum	200,000^{^}
United Kingdom (BPI)	Gold	100,000^{*}
United States (RIAA)	3× Platinum	3,000,000^{‡}
^{*} Sales figures based on certification alone.^{^} Shipments figures based on certification alone.^{‡} Sales+streaming figures based on certification alone.
