= Opiate (disambiguation) =

An opiate is any of the narcotic alkaloids found in opium.

Opiate may also refer to:

- Opiate, an alias of Danish musician and producer Thomas Knak
- Opiate (EP), an EP by progressive rock band Tool
  - "Opiate" (song), a song and title track by Tool
- "Opiate Float", a song by Nebula from their 2006 album Apollo
- "Opiated", a song by The Tragically Hip from the album Up to Here
- "Opiate", a 2025 song by Kid Cudi from Free

== See also ==
- List of opioids
- Opioid epidemic
