= Too Much 4 Much =

Former Canadian television show

- Also known as: A Question of Taste
- Created by: Denise Donlon
- Country of origin: Canada

Original release
- Network: MuchMusic
- Release: April 1991 – 2003

Too Much 4 Much is a Canadian television series, which aired on MuchMusic. The series, which aired at 12:00am Eastern time, played controversial videos which had, for one reason or another, been banned from regular rotation on the network, and featured panel discussions on the issues raised by the videos in question. Beginning in 1991 as a series of irregular specials aired when a particularly high-profile video was in dispute, it was expanded into a regular monthly series in 1993.

Created by Denise Donlon, the series' goals included increasing media literacy skills among the channel's viewers, and providing a forum for the channel to discuss, debate and be accountable to viewers for its programming decisions.

The series first aired as a one-off special, subtitled A Question of Taste, in April 1991, after the channel had banned two high-profile pop videos, Madonna's "Justify My Love" and Mitsou's "Dis-moi, dis-moi", within a short time of each other. On the program's first airing, both videos were played in their uncensored, unedited entirety, followed by a panel discussion on whether the videos' explicit sexuality and nudity constituted pornography or art. Panelists included broadcaster Daniel Richler and newspaper publisher Michael Hollett. A second special aired in October 1992, after another Madonna video, "Erotica", was determined to violate the channel's broadcast standards.

Too Much became a regular monthly series in 1993, after Donlon was promoted to head of programming for the channel.

Other artists whose videos were discussed on the series included Johnny Cash ("Delia's Gone", 1993), Morbid Angel ("Rapture", 1993), Sepultura ("Territory", 1993), Marilyn Manson, Metallica ("Turn the Page", 1998), Nine Inch Nails ("Happiness in Slavery", 1992), New Kids on the Block ("Dirty Dawg", 1994), Meshell Ndegeocello ("Leviticus: Faggot", 1996), 95 South ("Whoot, There It Is", 1993) and Tool ("Prison Sex", 1993).

The series was cancelled in 2003.
