= Pneuma (song) =

2020 song by Tool

Single by Tool

from the album Fear Inoculum
- Released: April 4, 2020
- Genre: Alternative metal; progressive metal; post-metal
- Length: 11:53
- Songwriters: Maynard James Keenan; Justin Chancellor; Adam Jones; Danny Carey
- Producer: Tool

Tool singles chronology
| "Fear Inoculum" (2019) | "Pneuma" (2020) | "Opiate²" (2022) |

"Pneuma" is a song by American rock band Tool, released as the second single from their fifth studio album Fear Inoculum on April 4, 2020. It peaked at number 15 on the Billboard Mainstream Rock Songs chart.

== Background ==
The song was first released on the band's fifth studio album, Fear Inoculum on August 30, 2019; it was not a song that had been teased or played live prior to the album's release. It was first performed live in mid-October of the same year at the Aftershock Festival. The song was released as the second single from the album in early 2020, and spent twenty weeks on the Billboard Mainstream Rock Songs chart, peaking at number 15.

Band members gave the song particular attention, with publications noting members releasing extra footage of the song, including a specific "drummer-cam" video of drummer Danny Carey performing his parts of the song, and guitarist Adam Jones releasing a guitar-tutorial on how to play the last verse's guitar riff. This was considered rare, with the band usually being cryptic and generally withholding information from the public.

== Composition and themes ==
The song was described as having a mellow start that builds in intensity over the course of its eleven-minute playtime. The track has multiple lengthy instrumental interludes, some parts focusing on drumming, others on guitar parts. It was described as "atmospheric" and "trippy", while containing what LoudWire writer Graham Hartmann described as "middle-eastern [sic] drumming". Jones describes the song's guitar part as "not difficult to play, but very satisfying". He also noted that Justin Chancellor's bass riff "stays on the original [guitar] riff so there are some nice little conflicting moments between the two parts".

In a rhythmic analysis, Drumeo broke down the time signature of the verse groove as a repeating cycle of 6/8, 6/8, 5/8, 6/8, 5/8, 5/8, which could be also grouped as 12/8, 11/8, 10/8; during the interlude, Carey plays a continuing pattern of Swiss Army Triplets while moving around various acoustic toms and drum pads. Outside of the verses, there are other time signatures throughout the piece as well such as 6/8 and 4/4 in the intro.

The song is titled after the Greek term for spirit or soul, pneuma, with the lyrics referring to breathing.

== Reception ==
The song was noted as a standout track from the Fear Inoculum album. Revolver described Danny Carey's drumming on the track as "jaw-dropping" and "almost supernatural". Metal Injection praised Carey's performance as "absolutely slaying". Loudwire noted the song had become a favorite among the band's fanbase as well. Dream Theater drummer Mike Portnoy, upon accepting a challenge from Drumeo to learn the song for a video, compared the song to a mathematic equation due to the constantly changing time signatures. Portnoy later posted a comment on the video, saying in part that it was an "exercise in human torture".

== Personnel ==
- Maynard James Keenan – vocals
- Adam Jones – guitar
- Justin Chancellor – bass
- Danny Carey – drums

== Charts ==
Chart performance for "Pneuma"
| Chart (2020) | Peak position |
|---|---|
| Australia (ARIA) | 78 |
| Ireland (IRMA) | 84 |
| UK Rock & Metal (OCC) | 8 |
| US Hot Rock & Alternative Songs (Billboard) | 4 |
| US Rock Airplay (Billboard) | 31 |

== Certifications ==
Certifications and sales for "Pneuma"
| Region | Certification | Certified units/sales |
|---|---|---|
| New Zealand (RMNZ) | Platinum | 30,000^{‡} |
^{‡} Sales+streaming figures based on certification alone.
