= Parabola (song) =

2001 song by Tool

Single by Tool

from the album Lateralus
- Released: January 2002
- Recorded: 2001
- Genre: Progressive metal
- Length: 6:03
- Label: Volcano II; Tool Dissectional
- Songwriters: Danny Carey; Justin Chancellor; Adam Jones; Maynard James Keenan
- Producers: Tool; David Bottrill

Tool singles chronology
"Schism" (2001)	"Parabola" (2002)	"Lateralus" (2002)

"Parabola" is a song by American rock band Tool. The song was released as the second single from their third studio album Lateralus. Initially released in 2002 as a promo only, the single was re-released on December 20, 2005, which includes the song and a DVD containing the music video and an optional "dual" audio commentary on the video by Jello Biafra of Dead Kennedys. The dual commentary consists of two separate recordings of Biafra's voice, one playing in each stereo channel. The DVD was released alongside a DVD single for "Schism" as well. The song uses a modified drop-B tuning for the guitars.

The song is featured on the video game Guitar Hero World Tour. The song was played onboard Space Shuttle mission STS-130, as a wake-up call for astronaut Robert Behnken.

Parabola explores the Heideggerian concept of life subjectively experienced as "feeling eternal" in the moment by the consciousness held within its mortal physical body.

== Music video ==
In support of this promo single, a music video was released – clocking in at over ten minutes because of the inclusion of the song “Parabol” (a separate track on the album set right before “Parabola”. The last note of “Parabol” can also be heard at the beginning of “Parabola” in Guitar Hero: World Tour.) Like all of their other videos, it was directed by Adam Jones.

The first section includes humanoids meeting and cutting pomaceous fruit, then vomiting black liquid in a circle.

The second section features interactions between a small stop-motion creature and a man (played by English musician Tricky). The small creature calls out to the man for help but is crushed and killed by The Berry. The man cuts the creature's body in half, then wanders into a forest and encounters a leaf that turns into a flaming eye.

In the final section, The man sees himself as transparent, with all the internal functions of his body visible. Two flaming eyes appear and begin to fly around his body. As the eyes glide about, lotus flowers symbolizing the "Chakras", begin to line up in the center of his body. The two flaming eyes then join on his forehead to form a "third eye" and the man is assimilated into an endless, glowing pattern.

The whole sequence could be a visual presentation of a mystical experience called "Kundalini awakening", in which a mystical energy or force called Kundalini rises through two intertwined channels within the body.

Painter Alex Grey created the design and was deeply involved in the animation from the beginning of the flaming eye sequence through to the end of the video.

== Track listing ==
Promotional single

1. "Parabola" (radio edit) – 6:08
2. "Parabol" – 3:04
3. "Parabola" (album version) – 6:03

DVD single

1. "Parabola" (video) – 10:09
2. "Parabola" (commentary) – 10:09
3. "Parabol" (Lustmord remix) – 11:35

== Personnel ==
Tool

- Danny Carey – drums
- Justin Chancellor – bass
- Adam Jones – guitar, art direction
- Maynard James Keenan – vocals

Production

- Produced by David Bottrill
- Mixing by Lustmord
- Art direction by Adam Jones

== Chart performance ==
Chart (2002)	Peak position
US Alternative Airplay (Billboard)	31
US Mainstream Rock (Billboard)	10

== Certifications ==
Certifications for "Parabola"
Region	Certification	Certified units/sales
New Zealand (RMNZ)	Platinum	30,000^{‡}
^{‡} Sales+streaming figures based on certification alone.
