= Prison Sex =

1993 single by Tool

Single by Tool

from the album Undertow
- Released: 1993
- Studio: Grand Master (Hollywood)
- Genre: Alternative metal
- Length: 4:56
- Label: Zoo
- Composers: Adam Jones; Maynard James Keenan; Danny Carey; Paul D'Amour
- Lyricist: Maynard James Keenan
- Producers: Sylvia Massy; Tool

Tool singles chronology
"Prison Sex" (1993)	"Sober" (1994)

"Prison Sex" is a song by American rock band Tool. Featuring lyrics written by frontman Maynard James Keenan, it was released as the first single from their debut studio album, Undertow (1993). The song uses a modified drop-D tuning (which is originally tuned as DADGBE, however, Prison Sex is tuned as BADGBE). The track features an "anti-climax" coda, in which memorable verses and choruses dissolve into an unrelated, quiet final section.

== Music video ==
The video for "Prison Sex" was created with stop-motion animation techniques. It was directed by the band's guitarist Adam Jones (who had previous experience in art direction and animation, including work on the dinosaurs in Jurassic Park) and was edited by Ken Andrews. The video was removed from the MTV playlist due to its disturbing content. "Prison Sex" was also nominated for 1994's MTV Music Video Awards' Best Special Effects category.

The video primarily revolves around a battered white humanoid, robotic-like doll figure trapped in a room full of cabinets that contain other humanoids, such as a caterpillar with the main humanoid's face, a jar with a wasp inside, a robotic character with a little child's face that twists and turns, and a being made out of what looks like meat and feces. During various points in the video the main character is confronted by a larger black humanoid who causes the doll to go catatonic. While catatonic, the black figure paints the doll black with a paintbrush, a metaphor for molestation. In the beginning of the video, the black figure severs the doll's legs (even though they still move by themselves) and hangs them out of reach of the doll. By the end of the video, the doll subjects itself to the abuse by painting itself. In the final shot, it is revealed that the doll was in its own cabinet the whole time when the black figure closes the cabinet door.

== Controversy ==
With the release of the 1993 single "Prison Sex" and its music video, directed and created by Adam Jones, MuchMusic called the band into question by deeming the video too graphic and offensive, later running an episode of its Too Much 4 Much series to discuss the video.

MTV stopped airing the "Prison Sex" video after a few viewings due to its symbolism depicting the sensitive subject of child abuse. Maynard James Keenan, who wrote the lyrics, has been quite clear in concerts about his dislike for his stepfather.

== Track listing ==
=== UK version ===
1. "Prison Sex"
2. "Undertow" (live)
3. "Opiate" (live)
4. "Prison Sex" (radio edit)

=== German version ===
1. "Prison Sex"
2. "Intolerance" (live)
3. "Undertow" (live)
4. "Opiate" (live)

=== Australian ===
1. "Prison Sex"
2. "Intolerance" (live)
3. "Undertow" (live)
4. "Opiate" (live)
5. "Prison Sex" (radio edit)

=== Promotional radio version ===
1. "Prison Sex" (radio edit)
2. "Prison Sex"

== Charts ==
Chart (1994)	Peak position
Australia (ARIA)	172
UK Singles (Official Charts)	81
US Mainstream Rock (Billboard)	32

Chart (2019)	Peak position
US Hot Rock & Alternative Songs (Billboard)	18
