= The Witness (song) =

Song by Adam Jones

Single by Adam Jones featuring Justin Chancellor and Danny Carey
- Released: October 27, 2020
- Recorded: 2020
- Length: 7:38
- Songwriter(s): Adam Jones

"The Witness" is an instrumental song by American rock guitarist Adam Jones. The song features performances from three members of the American rock band Tool, including Jones himself on guitar, Justin Chancellor on bass, and Danny Carey on drums. The song is the first collaboration between the three since Tool's 2019 album Fear Inoculum, and, alongside its music video/short film, is meant to promote Jones' release of his own signature guitar through Gibson Les Paul.

== Background ==
After a thirteen-year wait, Tool finally released their fifth studio album, Fear Inoculum, in August 2019. While the band toured in support of the album through the end of the year, their plans to tour through 2020 were cancelled due to restrictions placed in response to the COVID-19 pandemic. While frontman Maynard James Keenan announced his intention to return to work on his side project Puscifer, drummer Danny Carey announced his hopes that Tool members would come together and work on new material in the studio during the forced downtime.

On October 27, "The Witness" was released. The song, composed by Tool guitarist Adam Jones was a seven-minute instrumental featuring himself on guitar, and Tool members Justin Chancellor and Carey on bass and drums respectively. Additionally, frequent Tool collaborator and producer Joe Barresi was credited to mixing the track. Despite involving the entire band and its producer, except for Keenan, and frequently being mentioned in the context of Tool, "The Witness" is credited as an Adam Jones song.

The song's music video, also created by Jones, who frequently makes Tool videos, was noted to feature a lot of bizarre imagery, including an empty spacesuit floating through an abandoned forest on an island, a strange bug-human hybrid struggling, and a series of extreme close-ups of a guitar. The song and video is also meant as promotion for Jones' release of his own line of signature guitars - the "Adam Jones 1979 Les Paul Custom", which faithfully recreates his guitar used on the Fear Inoculum tour and on every Tool album.

== Themes and composition ==
Publications noted the song's similarity in sound to the music of Tool.

== Reception ==
Guitar.com deemed the song and accompanying video as the best guitar-release promotion of all time, especially praising the video choice of strange imagery over a more normal scenario of a person plainly playing a guitar.

== Personnel ==
Performance

- Adam Jones - guitar, composition
- Justin Chancellor - bass
- Danny Carey - drums

Production

- Todd Harapiak - production
- Tim Dawson - production
- Joe Barresi - mixing
