= Opiate (EP) =

EP by Tool
- Released: March 10, 1992
- Recorded: December 1991 – January 1992
- Venues: Jellö Loft (Hollywood, California)
- Studios: Sound City (Van Nuys, California)
- Genre: Alternative metal
- Length: 26:52
- Label: Zoo Entertainment
- Producers: Sylvia Massy; Steve Hansgen; Tool

Tool chronology
72826 (1991)	Opiate (1992)	Undertow (1993)

Alternative cover
- Cover art for the re-release and digital versions

Professional ratings
Review scores
Source	Rating
AllMusic	3/5 stars
Kerrang!	3/5 stars
Rolling Stone	3/5 stars
The Rolling Stone Album Guide	3/5 stars
Select	4/5 stars

Opiate is an EP by the American rock band Tool. It was produced and engineered by Sylvia Massy and Steve Hansgen. Released in 1992, it was the result of two years of the band playing together after their formation in 1990. Opiate preceded Tool's first full-length release, Undertow, by a year. It is named after a quote by Karl Marx: "religion ... is the opiate of the masses". It was certified platinum by the RIAA. The EP charted on several international charts when Tool released their catalog to online streaming in August 2019.

== Background and recording ==
Opiate features seven songs spanning six tracks, two of which are live recordings. Most versions of the EP (all except the cassette) feature the hidden seventh song titled "The Gaping Lotus Experience". On CD versions, the song is hidden at the end of the last track of the album, "Opiate", and begins approximately 6 minutes and 10 seconds into the track after "Opiate" has concluded. Vinyl copies of the EP featured a double groove on the second side; one which contained "Cold and Ugly", with the second containing "The Gaping Lotus Experience" and a small period of silence. Both grooves led into "Jerk-Off".

The song "Sweat" was featured on the Escape from L.A. soundtrack.

"Cold and Ugly" and "Jerk-Off" were recorded specially for the album at the Jellö Loft Hollywood on New Year's Eve 1991 with a live audience. As a result, these two songs have never been available as true "studio" recordings except for the band's 1991 demo tape 72826. This demo tape also featured early versions of "Hush" and "Part of Me" (as well as "Crawl Away" and "Sober", which would eventually make it on Undertow), and was used to get the band signed. All four songs were re-recorded for the EP.

In the original CD inserts for the album there is a collage of photos of the band members as children, among various items and trinkets, and also includes a picture of someone engaging in necrophilia with a well-decomposed cadaver. In reality, it is a friend of the band joking around in prop maker Stan Winston's studio.

A black and white music video was made for the track "Hush", the band's first. The Canadian music channel MuchMusic played it regularly.

== Music and lyrics ==
Along with Undertow, many Tool fans consider Opiate to be the band's heaviest album. The connection fans have to the EP was addressed on the song "Hooker with a Penis" from their third release and second LP Ænima. The EP features straightforward song structures in place of the progressive traits the band became known for later in their career. In a 2013 interview, guitarist Adam Jones stated "I love metal, but I love the other stuff that's been contributed by the band. When we started out, the record company said that we had to pick our heaviest songs, because that's the impact - you're metal and that's really important."

Lyrical subjects explored on Opiate include censorship and organized religion.

== 2013 reissue ==
On March 26, 2013, the band released a special 21st anniversary limited edition package of the album, which includes bonus features, such as new artwork. The artist Adi Granov provided the illustrations for the packaging and It was limited to only 5,000 copies. The packaging was also done with a Heidelberg Cylinder Press.

== Track listing ==
All lyrics are written by Maynard James Keenan; all music is composed by Adam Jones, Keenan, Danny Carey and Paul D'Amour.

No.	Title	Length
1.	"Sweat"	3:46
2.	"Hush"	2:48
3.	"Part of Me"	3:17
4.	"Cold and Ugly" (live)	4:09
5.	"Jerk-Off" (live)	4:24
6.	"Opiate" (the song ends at 5:20. The hidden song "The Gaping Lotus Experience" starts at 6:10, after 50 seconds of silence.)	8:28
Total length:		26:52

Notes

- "Cold and Ugly" and "Jerk-Off" were recorded live on New Year's Eve 1991/1992 at the Jellö Loft, in Hollywood, CA.

== Personnel ==
Personnel taken from Opiate liner notes.

Tool

- Maynard James Keenan – vocals
- Adam Jones – guitars
- Paul D'Amour – bass
- Danny Carey – drums

Additional personnel

- Steve Hansgen – production
- Sylvia Massy – production, engineering, mixing
- Tool – production
- John Jackson – mixing assistance
- Eddy Schreyer – mastering
- Jeff Sheehan – engineering assistance

== Charts ==
Chart (2019)	Peak position
Australian Albums (ARIA)	43
Canadian Albums (Billboard)	85
Swiss Albums (Schweizer Hitparade)	87
US Billboard 200	59

== Certifications ==
Region	Certification	Certified units/sales
Australia (ARIA)	Platinum	70,000^{‡}
Canada (Music Canada)	Platinum	100,000^{‡}
United States (RIAA)	Platinum	1,000,000^{^}
^{^} Shipments figures based on certification alone.^{‡} Sales+streaming figures based on certification alone.
