= Hush (Tool song) =

Song by Tool

from the EP Opiate
- Released: March 10, 1992
- Studio: Sound City (Van Nuys, California)
- Length: 2:48
- Label: Zoo
- Songwriter: Tool
- Producers: Sylvia Massy; Steve Hansgen; Tool

"Hush" is a song by American rock band Tool from their 1992 debut EP Opiate, recorded by producer Sylvia Massy at Sound City Studios.

== Background ==
It was the first song that helped establish the band's reputation. The lyrics protest Tipper Gore and censorship, which is a recurring theme in Tool songs.

The song was first recorded on a self-titled demo tape variously known as Toolshed and 72826, recorded in mid-1991. This demo version is not the same as the studio recording that appears on Opiate.

== Music video ==
The music video for "Hush" was Tool's first ever music video. The video is shown in black-and-white; in it, the band members appear nude in a white room, with black tape over their mouths. Toward the end of the video the band members are seen to be foaming at the mouth through the tape and eventually remove the tape itself. Signs shown over their genitalia read "Parental Advisory: Explicit Parts", a parody of the "Parental Advisory: Explicit Lyrics" sticker.

The Canadian music channel MuchMusic played it regularly.

There is a misconception that Ken Andrews was the director, but the concept was entirely provided by vocalist Maynard James Keenan. It is the only Tool music video other than "Sober" in which the band members appear, and the only one in which they appear in a prominent fashion.

The music video was released in 2000 as a bonus on the DVD, but not the VHS, of the Salival box set.

== Personnel ==
- Maynard James Keenan – vocals
- Adam Jones – guitar
- Paul D'Amour – bass
- Danny Carey – drums
