= Lateralus (song) =

2002 song by Tool

Single by Tool

from the album Lateralus
- Released: February 2002
- Recorded: 2000
- Genre: Progressive metal
- Length: 9:24 (album version); 5:47 (radio edit)
- Label: Volcano II; Tool Dissectional
- Songwriters: Danny Carey; Justin Chancellor; Adam Jones; Maynard James Keenan
- Producers: Tool; David Bottrill

Tool singles chronology
"Parabola" (2002)	"Lateralus" (2002)	"Vicarious" (2006)

Audio sample
- Excerpt of "Lateralus".: file; help

"Lateralus" is a song by American rock band Tool. The song is the third single and title track of their third studio album Lateralus.

== Overview and background ==
The song is known for its distinct time signatures and corresponding lyrical patterns. The time signatures of the chorus of the song change from 9/8 to 8/8 to 7/8; as drummer Danny Carey says, "It was originally titled 9-8-7. For the time signatures. Then it turned out that 987 was the 16th number of the Fibonacci sequence. So that was cool."

== Interpretation ==
In a 2001 interview, singer Maynard James Keenan commented on the lyric mentioning black, white, red and yellow: "I use the archetype stories of North American aboriginals and the themes or colors which appear over and over again in the oral stories handed down through generations. Black, white, red, and yellow play very heavily in aboriginal stories of creation."

The line "As below so above and beyond, I imagine" is a reference to Hermeticism and the Emerald Tablet.

== Mathematical significance ==
In July 2017, in an interview with Joe Rogan, Maynard described his thoughts on the song; "...in a way a song like Lateralus with the Fibonacci thing, I feel like I kind of pulled a very pedestrian, sophomoric move by including those numbers in there because in general music is the Phi ratio. Everything that all nature, all these things we’re talking about, it’s already here. By pointing it out like, staring at it, pointing at it with those numbers present, and the way that the numbers and the lyrics are, I feel like, you know, it's good to let people know about it, but I almost feel like it was kind of a dick joke, in a way. It’s… um… I could do better.”

The syllables Maynard sings in the first verse follow the first six numbers in the pattern, ascending and descending in the sequence 1-1-2-3-5-8-5-3. "Black (1), then (1), white are (2), all I see (3), in my infancy (5). Red and yellow then came to be (8), reaching out to me (5). Lets me see (3)."

In the next verse, Maynard begins with the seventh number of the Fibonacci sequence (13), implying a missing verse in between. He descends back down with the following pattern; 13-8-5-3. "As below so above and beyond I imagine (13). Drawn beyond the lines of reason (8). Push the envelope (5). Watch it bend (3)." The second verse adds the missing line to complete the sequence; "There is (2), so (1), much (1), more that (2), beckons me (3), to look through to these (5), infinite possibilities (8)." 1-1-2-3-5-8-5-3-2-1-1-2-3-5-8-13-8-5-3.

== Reception ==
Loudwire listed "Lateralus" as number one on their list of the Top 50 Metal Songs of the 21st Century.

== Chart performance ==
Chart (2001–02)	Peak position
US Alternative Airplay (Billboard)	18
US Mainstream Rock (Billboard)	14
