= Sober (Tool song) =

- International retail artwork

Single by Tool

from the album Undertow
- Released: 1994
- Studio: Grand Master (Hollywood)
- Genre: Alternative metal
- Length: 5:06
- Label: Zoo; BMG
- Songwriters: Adam Jones; Maynard James Keenan; Danny Carey; Paul D'Amour
- Producers: Sylvia Massy; Tool

Tool singles chronology
"Prison Sex" (1993)	"Sober" (1994)	"Stinkfist" (1996)

"Sober" is a song by American rock band Tool. It was released as the second single from their debut studio album, Undertow (1993). Tool guitarist Adam Jones has stated in an interview that the song is about a friend of the band whose artistic expression only comes out when he is under the influence. "A lot of people give him shit for that," Jones explains. "If you become addicted and a junkie, well, that's your fault."

== Writing ==
"Sober" is one of the earliest songs composed by Maynard James Keenan, with roots dating back to a 1987 live performance (released as Peace Day with his first band, Children of the Anachronistic Dynasty) in which the song was called "Burn About Out". The song contains some lyrics from the first verse of "Sober", with the same basic melody, although the melody is considerably faster and has an instrumental chorus.

The song was recorded by Keenan with Tool for the first time on a demo EP titled 72826, released in 1991.

"Sober" has a similar chord progression to the Led Zeppelin song "Kashmir", which has inspired other bands to do mashups of the two songs, something of which Tool has approved.

== Music video ==
Screenshot of the Sober music video depicting the humanoid being.

A music video for "Sober" was made in 1993. It debuted in May of that same year and was directed by Fred Stuhr. It was filmed using stop-motion animation, with the characters' models designed by Adam Jones. It was the first of Tool's videos to be made in stop motion, the earlier promo video for "Hush" being live action. Whereas all four band members could be seen at all times during the previous clip, "Sober" shows only brief flashes of them.

The video's protagonist is a small, humanoid being, who lives and sleeps in an abandoned mansion, in a rusty room sparsely decorated with a table, a chair, and a bed with no mattress and a curtain as a blanket. He happens to stumble upon a wooden box, which he opens near the beginning. Its contents are kept hidden for the majority of the video's duration, but it seems that whatever it is, it has had adverse mind altering effects – there are repeated shots of the humanoid levitating in his chair, and his head and arm vibrating wildly. While experiencing these effects, the figure ventures through his living quarters and its many corridors.

The climax provides a barrage of imagery and revelations: a figure attached to a wall behind a translucent screen, a sentry of sorts wielding a mobile, robotic cannon and an organic substance flowing through a pipe found in the house. At the end, the box is empty, leaving the viewer to determine its meaning.

Nirvana frontman Kurt Cobain claimed the video was a “shameless ripoff” of the stop-motion animations by filmmakers the Brothers Quay.

== Track listings ==
US promo single
No.	Title	Length
1.	"Sober" (album version)	5:06

International CD-single
No.	Title	Length
1.	"Sober" (album version)	5:06
2.	"Bottom" (live)	6:24
3.	"Intolerance" (live)	4:43

Sober – Tales from the Darkside
No.	Title	Length
1.	"Sober" (album version)	5:06
2.	"Undertow" (live at Lollapalooza '93 – 8/6/93)	5:42
3.	"Sober" (live at Lollapalooza '93 – 8/6/93)	5:10
4.	"Opiate" (live at Lollapalooza '93 – 8/6/93)	6:17
5.	"Flood" (live at Lollapalooza '93 – 8/6/93)	3:40
6.	"Prison Sex" (live at Lollapalooza '93 – 8/6/93)	4:50
7.	"Jerk-Off" (live at Lollapalooza '93 – 8/6/93)	4:18
8.	"Prison Sex" (live at Lowland Paradise Festival, Dronten, The Netherlands – 8/29/93)	5:01
9.	"Bottom" (live at Lowland Paradise Festival, Dronten, The Netherlands – 8/29/93)	6:24

== Personnel ==
- Maynard James Keenan – vocals
- Adam Jones – guitar
- Paul D'Amour – bass
- Danny Carey – drums

== Charts ==
Chart (1993–1994)	Peak position
Australia (ARIA)	131
US Mainstream Rock Airplay (Billboard)	13

Chart (2019)	Peak position
US Hot Rock & Alternative Songs (Billboard)	3

== Certifications ==
Certifications for "Sober"
Region	Certification	Certified units/sales
New Zealand (RMNZ)	2× Platinum	60,000^{‡}
^{‡} Sales+streaming figures based on certification alone.
