= Fear Inoculum =

Studio album by Tool
- Released: August 30, 2019
- Recorded: March 2018 – January 2019
- Studios: Henson, Hollywood; United Recording, Los Angeles; The Loft, Los Angeles
- Genres: Progressive rock; progressive metal; alternative metal; post-metal
- Length: 79:10 (CD); 84:29 (vinyl); 86:43 (digital)
- Labels: Tool Dissectional; Volcano; RCA
- Producer: Tool

Tool chronology
10,000 Days (2006)	Fear Inoculum (2019)

Singles from Fear Inoculum
- 1. "Fear Inoculum" Released: August 7, 2019; 2. "Pneuma" Released: April 4, 2020

Fear Inoculum is the fifth studio album by the American rock band Tool. It was released on August 30, 2019, through Tool Dissectional, Volcano Entertainment, and RCA Records. It is the band's first album in 13 years, due to creative, personal, and legal issues band members encountered since the release of 10,000 Days (2006). It was released to critical acclaim, with reviewers generally agreeing that the band had successfully refined their established sound. The album topped the US Billboard 200 chart, their third in a row to do so, selling over 270,000 album-equivalent units. The album topped five other national album charts in its opening week as well. Two songs off the album received Grammy nominations, the first single "Fear Inoculum", for the Grammy Award for Best Rock Song, and "7empest", for the Grammy Award for Best Metal Performance, with the latter winning the award.

== Background ==
=== Writing ===
In 2006, Tool released their fourth studio album, 10,000 Days. It topped the US Billboard 200 album chart and was certified platinum by the RIAA, indicating more than one million units sold, a month later. The band toured heavily in support of the album, playing more than 200 shows through 2007. After this, frontman Maynard James Keenan mentioned that he saw Tool breaking up in the near future, and focused on his side project, Puscifer. However, by early 2008, at the 50th Grammy Awards, Keenan announced to MTV that the band would begin writing new material for their fifth studio album "right away".

The band was quiet over the next few years, only with Tool's website announcing that guitarist Adam Jones, bassist Justin Chancellor, and drummer Danny Carey were working on instrumental material while Keenan focused his efforts on Puscifer. The approach was consistent with what the band had done in the past, with Keenan waiting to write vocals and lyrics until instrumentals were completed. In 2012, the band's website was updated again, with the webmaster writing that he had heard instrumental material that had "sounded like Tool…some of it reminiscent to earlier Tool stuff, with other parts pushing the envelope" and that he estimated that the album was around half done.

Outside problems slowed progress on the album over the following years. In 2013, it was reported that two separate scooter accidents injured two undisclosed members of the band, eliminating nine days of planned “jamming” time. Carey later revealed himself as one of the involved members, noting that he had been involved in a motorcycle accident that resulted in multiple cracked ribs, which caused him pain that further slowed recording. Keenan summed up the album's progress at the time in a cooking analogy, explaining that "Basically right now it's a lot of ideas. There's no actual songs…It's still kind of noodles in a big basket. Lots of noodles, just no dishes." In 2014, Jones and Carey revealed that complicated legal issues and court battles stemming from a 2007 lawsuit had been slowing down the process as well. The issues stemmed from a lawsuit from a friend who claimed credit for artwork the band had used, but escalated after an insurance company involved sued the band over technicalities, leading to the band then counter-suing the insurance company. The constant court battles and delays, coupled with other life obligations, limited the band's time for working on music, and drained members of their motivation to be creative and write music. At the time, Carey stated that only one song was “pretty much done”, an untitled ten-minute track. In 2015, Jones announced that the legal issues were completely over.

The four of us are a lot of fucking work, just to get anywhere, oh my god. Everything’s a fucking committee meeting and it always gets shut down. [The hurdle is] success. When you get successful, you think you’re right about everything and you’re pretty sure as that individual — ‘I am right and you are wrong, because I’m successful and we’re successful because of me, not because of you.’ It’s not that bad with us, but there’s a dynamic of like, ‘I want this and I’ve always gotten my way and that’s why we’re successful, because I don’t compromise on this or that.’ I’m the same way. I’m totally the same way.

— Maynard James Keenan, on the creative struggles on writing Fear Inoculum.

Work on the album continued to progress through 2015 "slowly", according to Keenan. Jones reported that the band had 20 different song ideas being developed. The band toured, and debuted a new track, "Descending", in a shortened, incomplete form, according to Jones. Jones also reported that instrumentals had been completed and passed on to Keenan to work on, though he hesitated to call any of the work "done". While it was reported in early 2016 by the band's webmaster that it was largely just a few shorter songs and interludes that needed finishing, by the end of the year, Chancellor described the band's status as still "deep into the writing process”. He explained that while main themes and a loose "skeleton" had been established, Jones, Carey, and he were continually creating and reworking new instrumental content. This work on the album continued throughout 2017. At the time, Carey predicted finishing and releasing in mid-2018, while Keenan countered these claims, stating it would likely take longer than that to finish. Jones, Chancellor, and Carey continued to work on the album while Keenan returned to A Perfect Circle in late 2017 to work with Billy Howerdel to record and release their fourth studio album, Eat the Elephant, in early 2018. By February 2018, Keenan announced that he had received rough music files from the rest of the band members containing instrumentals labeled "FINAL" for all but one track on the album in the prior few months, and had since started writing lyrics and vocal melodies.

In retrospect, Keenan recounted that the band constantly second-guessing themselves was a reason for the album taking so long, and that he believes the version of the album the band had going eight years ago in 2011 would have been "fantastic" too. Chancellor noted that one of many guitar riffs used in the track “7empest” traced back to musical ideas written by Jones back in the mid-1990s. The band had tried to implement the riff into 10,000 Days without success as well. Carey notes that there were no completed songs that were left off the album, but that there were many partial guitar riffs and jam sessions that went unused from the sessions.

=== Recording ===
On March 10, 2018, Tool entered a major recording studio to start recording sessions with Joe Barresi, with whom they had worked on 10,000 Days. On May 11, it was reported that all drum parts had been tracked. In September, Keenan announced he had finished recording scratch vocals, but had not started final vocal takes. Keenan recorded his vocals during the 2018 wine harvest at his Caduceus Cellars winery, resulting in him having to fit in his recording hours around his winemaking. Barresi and engineer Mat Mitchell traveled to his Arizona home for the recording process. In January 2019, Keenan announced that he had finished his final vocal recording sessions "months ago", but that the album would still likely require lengthy mixing sessions. In the same month, Carey stated that they aimed to release the album in April 2019, though Keenan countered that this was unrealistic, instead pointing to a release between May and July. The band was in the studio with Bob Ludwig in March 2019; Ludwig had also mastered 10,000 Days.

== Composition and themes ==
The album consists of seven main tracks of music, and a run time just short of 80 minutes, the maximum runtime of CDs. The digital version of the album contains three short interlude tracks, stemming from Carey's scrapped plan to have the album be entirely one long song. Jones and Carey described the songs as lengthy, but containing multiple movements within each track. The concept of seven is a recurring theme of the album both musically and conceptually; Chancellor and Jones wrote guitar riffs in unusual time signatures related to the number seven, while Keenan introduced ideas related to seven as well. Music videos also covered the theme. The album also explores the concept of growing "older and wiser". Keenan explained that the album covers the idea of "embracing where we are right now, acknowledging where we've come from and some of the things we've gone through." Keenan also advised that patience and multiple listens were required in understanding the album, comparing it to a slowly developing movie. Jones described it as very different from their prior album 10,000 Days. Music critics and journalists have described the album as progressive rock, progressive metal, alternative metal, and post-metal.

== Release ==
The album was released on August 30, 2019, through the band's own Tool Dissectional imprint as well as Volcano Entertainment and RCA Records. Prior to release, the band toured in May 2019 in North America. It was reported in March that Jones had been working on album artwork, generally one of the last steps in the process. The band began pre-album release touring in May, kicking it off with a headlining show at Welcome to Rockville, where they debuted two new songs, "Descending" and "Invincible". The title was announced on July 29, 2019. On August 2, 2019, the band's back catalog was added to digital download and streaming outlets to promote the release, with Tool being one of the few holdouts among major artists. The album's cover art, revealed on August 5, was created by Alex Grey, who also created the art for the band's prior two albums. The album's opening track and first single to be released from the album, also titled "Fear Inoculum" was released on August 7. The song charted at number 93 on the Billboard Hot 100, and with its 10:21 runtime, became the longest song to ever enter the chart.

== Packaging and artwork ==
A deluxe edition of the album, which includes a full 4-inch (10 cm) HD screen (featuring original video material), a 2-watt speaker (featuring an additional song called "Recusant Ad Infinitum") and a 36-page insert book, was made available for pre-order on the same day as the digital edition of the album. The band's European distributor Napalm Records has this available as well. In November 2019, an "expanded book edition" of the album was announced containing all of the songs on the deluxe edition but without the electronic screen, speakers, etc. This edition included lenticular lens graphics, a book of lyrics and additional artwork, links to download the video experience and bonus song from the deluxe edition, and the audio CD.

== Reception ==
=== Critical ===
Professional ratings
Aggregate scores
Source	Rating
AnyDecentMusic?	7.6/10
Metacritic	81/100
Review scores
Source	Rating
AllMusic	4.5/5 stars
Clash	9/10
Consequence of Sound	A−
Entertainment Weekly	B+
Financial Times	4/5 stars
The Guardian	4/5 stars
Kerrang!	5/5
NME	5/5 stars
Pitchfork	5.4/10
Rolling Stone	3.5/5 stars

Fear Inoculum received acclaim from critics. At Metacritic, which assigns a normalized rating out of 100 to reviews from mainstream critics, the album has an average score of 81 out of 100, which indicates "universal acclaim" based on 23 reviews. NME gave Fear Inoculum a perfect score, singling out Keenan's work as "perhaps the best collection of vocals that singer Keenan has ever committed to tape, with many lines exiting the vocalist's lips closer to the honey daubed croon of Keenan's ... A Perfect Circle than the coarse rasp of yore" and concluding that the album was "worth the wait". The Boston Globe agreed with the sentiment, praising the album for being "an 80-minute prog-metal fever dream that proves the band is back and better than ever." The Atlantic praised the album for being as good as prior releases, describing it as "precise and devastating as it has always been" containing a "nearly unhandle-able amount of that Tool feeling." Spin praised the album "continu[ing] to blur the lines between art, psychedelia, alt metal, and prog rock with undiminished curiosity and skill" while "remain[ing] defiantly contrary to the auto-tuned, digitally-quantized world in which we now live."

Loudersound (formerly Metal Hammer) praised the album's density and layer of sound, and singling out Keenan's "grandiosity" and "emotional" vocals and the album's heaviest track, "7empest", as album highlights. Wall of Sound and Loudwire also singled out the track as one of the best of the band's career, with the former concluding that with the album on a whole, the band had "not so much reinvented the wheel, as they have refined everything about this band that makes them so special in the first place." AllMusic noted that all four band members sounded like they were performing at the peak of their career so far. Clash felt the album was a good entry point for new fans if they had patience for the album's long song lengths, which they praised, but conceded were not in line with musical trends. Rob Halford and Mike Portnoy called it one of their favorite albums of 2019. "7empest" was later nominated for the Grammy Award for Best Metal Performance, as was "Fear Inoculum" for the Grammy Award for Best Rock Song. “7empest” would go on to win the award, while “Fear Inoculum” lost to Gary Clark Jr. At the 2020 Billboard Music Awards, the album won Top Rock Album.

The album was not praised by all critics. Pitchfork noted that "You get what is expected of an album over a decade in the making: a more mature, sometimes exciting collection that feels both overworked and undercooked ... It is hard to parse the difference between which choices here are wise and which are stale."

=== Commercial ===
In the United States, Fear Inoculum debuted at number one on the Billboard 200 chart, selling 270,000 album-equivalent units, of which 248,000 were pure sales, earning Tool their third number-one album in the country. The album was marketed in two different formats: a digital download album, and a CD package that includes a HD screen with video footage, a speaker and a 36-page booklet. The CD package sold out at retail immediately, making Tool announce an additional set of CD/download combinations through their website. In the UK, Fear Inoculum debuted at number four.

=== Accolades ===
Year-end rankings

Publication	Accolade	Rank
AllMusic	Best of 2019	–
BrooklynVegan	Top 50 Albums of 2019	8
Consequence	Top 50 Albums of 2019	10
Consequence	Top 30 Metal + Hard Rock Albums of 2019	5
Contactmusic.com	Top 10 Albums of 2019	6
Exclaim!	10 Best Metal and Hardcore Albums of 2019	8
Gigwise	51 Best Albums of 2019	8
Good Morning America	50 of the Best Albums of 2019	3
The Hindu	15 Rock 'n' Roll Albums of 2019	2
Impose	Best Albums of 2019	–
Kerrang!	The 50 Best Albums of 2019	2
Louder Sound	Top 20 Rock Albums of 2019	19
Loudwire	The 50 Best Metal Albums of 2019	–
Revolver	25 Best Albums of 2019	1
Sputnikmusic	Top 50 Albums of 2019	12
Ultimate Classic Rock	10 Best Rock Albums of 2019	6
Ultimate Guitar	20 Best Albums of 2019	1

Decade-end rankings

Publication	Accolade	Rank
BrooklynVegan	141 Best Albums of the 2010s	96
Consequence	Top 25 Metal Albums of the 2010s	20
Good Morning America	50 Notable Albums of the Past Decade	36
Guitar World	20 Best Guitar Albums of the Decade	10
Kerrang!	The 75 Best Albums of the 2010s	13
Louder Sound	The 50 Best Rock Albums of the 2010s	2
Loudwire	The 66 Best Metal Albums of the Decade	10
Revolver	25 Best Albums of the 2010s	3
Ultimate Classic Rock	Top 50 Classic Rock Albums of the '10s	24

== Track listing ==
All tracks are written by Tool.

CD version
No.	Title	Length
1.	"Fear Inoculum"	10:21
2.	"Pneuma"	11:53
3.	"Invincible"	12:44
4.	"Descending"	13:37
5.	"Culling Voices"	10:05
6.	"Chocolate Chip Trip"	4:47
7.	"7empest"	15:44
Total length:		79:10

Digital version
No.	Title	Length
1.	"Fear Inoculum"	10:20
2.	"Pneuma"	11:53
3.	"Litanie contre la peur" (French for "litany against fear")	2:14
4.	"Invincible"	12:44
5.	"Legion Inoculant"	3:09
6.	"Descending"	13:37
7.	"Culling Voices"	10:05
8.	"Chocolate Chip Trip"	4:48
9.	"7empest"	15:43
10.	"Mockingbeat"	2:05
Total length:		86:43

Vinyl version

Side A
No.	Title	Length
1.	"Fear Inoculum"	10:20
2.	"Pneuma"	11:53
Total length:		22:13

Side B
No.	Title	Length
3.	"Invincible"	12:44
Total length:		12:44

Side C
No.	Title	Length
4.	"Legion Inoculant"	3:09
5.	"Descending"	13:37
Total length:		16:46

Side D
No.	Title	Length
6.	"Culling Voices"	10:05
7.	"Chocolate Chip Trip"	4:48
Total length:		14:53

Side E
No.	Title	Length
8.	"7empest"	15:43
9.	"Mockingbeat"	2:05
Total length:		17:48 (84:29)

== Personnel ==
Credits taken from the album's liner notes.

Tool

- Maynard James Keenan – vocals
- Adam Jones – guitars
- Justin Chancellor – bass
- Danny Carey – drums, synthesizers

Additional musicians

- Lustmord – waves and water sound effects on the track "Descending"

Production

- Tool – production
- "Evil" Joe Barresi – recording, mixing
- Bob Ludwig – mastering
- Recording assistance: Jun Murakawa, Morgan Stratton, Kevin Mills, Garret Lubow, Wesley Seidman, Scott Moore, Greg Foeller
- Guitar techs: Dan Druff, Tim Dawson, Scott Dachroaden, Pete Lewis, Sacha Dunable
- Drum techs: Bruce Jacoby, Jon Nicholson, Joe Slaby, Junior Kittlitz
- Additional tracking: Mat Mitchel, Tim Dawson, Andrew Means

Artwork and design

- Kristin Burns – photography
- Sean Cheetham – Tool portraits
- Ann Chien – photography
- Alex Grey – cover art, booklet art, video concept, video direction
- Dominic Hailstone – visual effects
- Adam Jones – art direction, video direction
- Alex Landeen – photography
- Mackie Osborne – design, layout
- Matthew Santoro – CGI, video design, VFX director
- Travis Shinn – photography
- Joyce Su – additional art, visual effects, design
- Ryan Tottle – visual effects
- Lee Young – photography

== Charts ==
=== Weekly charts ===
Weekly chart performance for Fear Inoculum
Chart (2019)	Peak position
Australian Albums (ARIA)	1
Austrian Albums (Ö3 Austria)	3
Belgian Albums (Ultratop Flanders)	1
Belgian Albums (Ultratop Wallonia)	4
Canadian Albums (Billboard)	1
Czech Albums (ČNS IFPI)	17
Danish Albums (Hitlisten)	4
Dutch Albums (Album Top 100)	3
Finnish Albums (Suomen virallinen lista)	2
French Albums (SNEP)	9
German Albums (Offizielle Top 100)	2
Greek Albums (IFPI)	10
Hungarian Albums (MAHASZ)	5
Irish Albums (IRMA)	4
Italian Albums (FIMI)	2
Japan Hot Albums (Billboard Japan)	29
Japanese Albums (Oricon)	44
Lithuanian Albums (AGATA)	8
New Zealand Albums (RMNZ)	1
Norwegian Albums (VG-lista)	1
Polish Albums (ZPAV)	6
Portuguese Albums (AFP)	1
Scottish Albums (Official Charts)	2
Spanish Albums (PROMUSICAE)	3
Swedish Albums (Sverigetopplistan)	7
Swiss Albums (Schweizer Hitparade)	2
UK Albums (Official Charts)	4
UK Rock & Metal Albums (OCC)	1
US Billboard 200	1
US Top Rock Albums (Billboard)	1
US Top Hard Rock Albums (Billboard)	1

=== Year-end charts ===
Year-end chart performance for Fear Inoculum
Chart (2019)	Position
Australian Albums (ARIA)	35
Belgian Albums (Ultratop Flanders)	51
German Albums (Offizielle Top 100)	57
New Zealand Albums (RMNZ)	47
US Billboard 200	114
US Top Album Sales (Billboard)	11
US Top Rock Albums (Billboard)	18
US Top Hard Rock Albums (Billboard)	14
Worldwide Albums (IFPI)	13

Chart (2020)	Position
Belgian Albums (Ultratop Flanders)	191
US Top Rock Albums (Billboard)	52

== Certifications ==
Certifications for Fear Inoculum
Region	Certification	Certified units/sales
Canada (Music Canada)	Gold	40,000^{‡}
New Zealand (RMNZ)	Platinum	15,000^{‡}
Poland (ZPAV)	Gold	10,000^{‡}
United States (RIAA)	Gold	500,000^{‡}
^{‡} Sales+streaming figures based on certification alone.

== See also ==
- "The Witness" a non-album instrumental released by band members in 2020.
