= Undertow (Tool album) =

Studio album by Tool
- Released: April 6, 1993
- Studio: Grand Master (Hollywood)
- Genres: Alternative metal; progressive metal
- Length: 68:08
- Label: Zoo
- Producers: Sylvia Massy; Tool

Tool chronology
| Opiate (1992) | Undertow (1993) | Ænima (1996) |

Singles from Undertow
- 1. "Prison Sex" Released: 1993; 2. "Sober" Released: 1994

Undertow is the debut studio album by the American rock band Tool, released on April 6, 1993, by Zoo Entertainment. Produced by the band and Sylvia Massy and recorded at Grand Master Studios in Hollywood, the album includes some tracks omitted from the band's debut EP Opiate and is their only album to feature original bassist Paul D'Amour.

According to AllMusic, Undertow helped heavy metal remain prominent as a mainstream musical style, and allowed several later bands to break through to the mainstream. It was released at a time when grunge was at the height of its popularity, and pop punk was slowly beginning to gather mainstream attention. AllMusic saw the album's success in the "striking, haunting visuals that complemented the album's nihilistic yet wistful mood."

As of 2021, Undertow has been certified triple platinum by the Recording Industry Association of America.

== Background ==
Comedian Bill Hicks is noted as "inspiration" in the album's liner notes. Undertow is the only Tool album released while he was still alive. Hicks's presence would feature prominently on Tool's next album, Ænima.

Chris Haskett, then with the Rollins Band, is credited in the liner notes with "sledge hammer", probably relating to the "three pianos and shotguns smashed with sledgehammers" on "Disgustipated". Adam Jones recalls a story in which the band purchased two second-hand pianos with the intention of blasting them with shotguns in the indoor parking lot of Grand Master Studio and putting the resulting sounds to tape. Apparently the woman running the studio was happy as long as they cleaned up the mess afterwards. Since the incident, Tool has been approached by other bands claiming to have seen the shotgun holes left by them in the parking lot wall.

== Artwork ==
The album art was designed by Adam Jones. Photos in the liner notes of a nude obese woman, a nude thin man, and the band members with pins in the sides of their heads generated controversy, resulting in the album being removed from stores such as Kmart and Walmart. The band reacted by releasing another version, which depicted a giant barcode on a white background. This version of the album included a note from the band:

It came to our attention recently that many stores across our fine and open minded nation would not stock Undertow because of our explicit artwork. Although we loathe being censored, ~~we want your money~~ we still want you to hear our music, so we took it out. However, it is available to you at no extra cost. Fill out the form, stick it in an envelope, mail it in, and we will send you the original artwork. Love, Tool

The message on the photographs of the band members reads "Trust me trust me trust me trust me trust me I just want to start this over say you won't go this is love I'll make weapons out of my imperfections lay back and let me show you another way only this one holy medium brings me peace of mind cleanse and purge me in the water twice as loud as reason euphoria I've been far too sympathetic no one told you to come I hope it sucks you down life feeds on life this is necessary." The songs the lyrics contained in the passage are from appear in this order: "Sober", "Crawl Away", "4°", "Prison Sex", "Flood", "Undertow", "Intolerance", "Swamp Song", "Disgustipated". The only quote missing from the album is "I'll make weapons out of my imperfections", a line from Maynard's original lyrics for "Bottom" before they were modified by guest Henry Rollins.

In some versions of the album, when the black CD tray is removed from the case, a picture of a cow licking what appears to be its genital region is revealed. In other versions of the album, released internationally, the picture of the cow licking the genital region is viewable without problems under the transparent backing of the disc case. The photo of the cow is accredited in the album's liner notes to have been taken by Danielle Bregman. The ribcage is also on the front cover of the album, but the obese woman is absent from the booklet; only the members of the band are depicted.

Adam Jones' pet pig, Moe, appears on the back cover amid an array of forks standing on end.

== Reception ==
Professional ratings
Review scores
| Source | Rating |
|---|---|
| AllMusic | 4/5 stars |
| Dotdash | 4.5/5 stars |
| Entertainment Weekly | A− |
| NME | 7/10 |
| The Rolling Stone Album Guide | 3.5/5 stars |
| Select | 2/5 stars |
| Q | 2/5 stars |

AllMusic gave the album a positive review, stating "With its technical brilliance, musical complexities, and aggressive overtones, Undertow not only paved the way for several bands to break through to the mainstream adolescent mall-rage demographic, it also proved that metal could be simultaneously intelligent, emotional, and brutal." In Entertainment Weekly's review of the album, David Browne said "Like many of its brethren in the alternative-metal corps—Alice in Chains, Stone Temple Pilots, and Helmet—Tool can crunch and lumber about with the best of them. What put this L.A. band a notch above the rest are better songs (with actual verses, choruses, and hooks-check out the terrific "Prison Sex") and the hints of vulnerability in singer Maynard James Keenan's voice".

In a Dotdash bibliographical article of the band, reviewer Tim Grierson called the album the "Essential Tool Album" and stated "It may be impossible to describe the impact that Undertow had at the time of its release in 1993. Searching, angry, liberating and scary, Tool's full-length debut emerged during a period in rock music when Seattle bands like Nirvana and Pearl Jam were expressing alienation through grunge riffs, inspiring lots of copycat artists. Undertow expressed alienation, too, but the album's imposing waves of misery and dread seemed to come from an entirely different planet than grunge, providing a startling counterpoint to the trendy sounds of the era". A less positive review came from Select writer Andrew Perry, who said "[B]ereft of the irony, danger and maverick punkiness of grunge's finest, Tool ultimately will only help Alice In Chains reassert the trad metal market. Which really isn't what we deserve."

== Accolades ==
| Publication | Country | Accolade | Year | Rank |
|---|---|---|---|---|
| Loudwire | US | 11 Best Debut Albums in Prog Metal | 2024 | — |

(—) designates unordered lists.

== Track listing ==
All tracks are written by Tool (Adam Jones, Maynard James Keenan, Danny Carey, and Paul D'Amour), except "Bottom" by Tool and Henry Rollins.

| No. | Title | Length |
|---|---|---|
| 1. | "Intolerance" | 4:53 |
| 2. | "Prison Sex" | 4:56 |
| 3. | "Sober" | 5:06 |
| 4. | "Bottom" | 7:14 |
| 5. | "Crawl Away" | 5:30 |
| 6. | "Swamp Song" | 5:31 |
| 7. | "Undertow" | 5:22 |
| 8. | "4°" | 6:03 |
| 9. | "Flood" | 7:46 |
| 10. | "Disgustipated" (Song ends at 6:45. Sounds of crickets chirping can be heard for 7 minutes and 5 seconds, then at 13:50 a hidden message plays while the crickets continue until the end.) | 15:47 |
| Total length: | | 68:08 |

Notes

- "Disgustipated" is track 69 on most pressings in North America (tracks 10–68 are silent; tracks 10–67 are one second each in length, and track 68 is two seconds). It also appears as track 39, track 10 (mostly in Europe and Australia) or as a hidden track following "Flood" on track nine. On certain Japanese imports, "Disgustipated" is track 70 and the tracklist is removed from the back. In most cases, however, it is listed as track 10 on the album itself. The track is omitted entirely on vinyl releases.

Japanese edition bonus track
| No. | Title | Length |
|---|---|---|
| 10. | "Opiate" (Does not include "The Gaping Lotus Experience") | 5:20 |
| Total length: | | 73:28 |

Australasian bonus disc
| No. | Title | Length |
|---|---|---|
| 1. | "Undertow" (Live in Irwindale 1993) | 5:42 |
| 2. | "Sober" (Live in Irwindale 1993) | 5:10 |
| 3. | "Opiate" (Live in Irwindale 1993) | 5:20 |
| 4. | "Flood" (Live in Irwindale 1993) | 3:40 |
| 5. | "Prison Sex" (Live in Irwindale 1993) | 4:50 |
| 6. | "Jerk Off" (Live in Irwindale 1993) | 4:18 |
| 7. | "Prison Sex" (Live in Dronten 1993) | 5:01 |
| 8. | "Bottom" (Live in Dronten 1993) | 6:24 |
| Total length: | | 40:25 |

== Personnel ==
Personnel taken from Undertow liner notes.

Tool

- Maynard James Keenan – vocals (listed as "Möstresticator")
- Adam Jones – guitars (listed as "Bastardometer")
- Paul D'Amour – bass guitar (listed as "Bottom Feeder")
- Danny Carey – drums (listed as "Membranophones")

Additional personnel

- Henry Rollins – additional vocals on "Bottom"
- Statik – programming (listed as "machines") on "Disgustipated"
- Chris Haskett – sledgehammers on "Disgustipated"

Production

- Sylvia Massy – production, engineering, mixing on "Disgustipated"
- Tool – production, art concept
- Ron St. Germain – mixing (all except "Disgustipated")
- Robert Fayer – engineering assistance
- Brad Cook – engineering assistance
- Chris Olivas – mix engineering assistance
- Howie Weinberg – mastering
- K. Lee Hammond – creative direction
- Adam Jones – art direction

== Charts ==
| Chart (1993–1994) | Peak position |
|---|---|
| Canada Top Albums/CDs (RPM) | 49 |
| New Zealand Albums (RMNZ) | 17 |
| US Billboard 200 | 50 |
| US Heatseekers Albums (Billboard) | 1 |

| Chart (2001) | Peak position |
|---|---|
| Dutch Albums (Album Top 100) | 89 |

| Chart (2019) | Peak position |
|---|---|
| Australian Albums (ARIA) | 21 |
| Belgian Albums (Ultratop Flanders) | 36 |
| US Billboard 200 | 19 |

== Certifications ==
| Region | Certification | Certified units/sales |
|---|---|---|
| Australia (ARIA) | Platinum | 70,000^{‡} |
| Canada (Music Canada) | Platinum | 100,000^{^} |
| New Zealand (RMNZ) | Platinum | 15,000^{‡} |
| United States (RIAA) | 3× Platinum | 3,000,000^{‡} |
^{^} Shipments figures based on certification alone.^{‡} Sales+streaming figures based on certification alone.
