= Opiate (song) =

1992 song by Tool

Song by Tool

from the EP Opiate
- Released: March 10, 1992
- Studio: Sound City (Van Nuys, California)
- Genre: Alternative metal
- Length: 5:20
- Label: Zoo
- Songwriters: Danny Carey; Paul D'Amour; Adam Jones; Maynard James Keenan
- Producers: Sylvia Massy; Steve Hansgen; Tool

"Opiate" is a song by American progressive metal band Tool and the title track from their debut EP recorded by producer Sylvia Massy at Sound City Studios. "Opiate" serves as the final track of the Opiate EP and contains the hidden track, "The Gaping Lotus Experience". The song plays as one continuous track with a runtime of 8:28. The Japanese edition of Undertow has this song as track 10; this version does not include "The Gaping Lotus Experience".

== Live performances ==
"Opiate" has held a regular position on Tool's concert setlist since 1992. In 1994, it was often played back-to-back with "Flood", transitioning smoothly between songs and skipping the lengthy "Flood" intro. By 1996, "Opiate" would often serve as the penultimate song of concerts, preceding "Ænema". Maynard James Keenan has dedicated the song to psychologist and author Timothy Leary on multiple occasions and to former Tool bassist Paul D'Amour on others, referring to him as "Paul of Love".

Various musicians have collaborated with Tool in performing "Opiate" live. Examples include Layne Staley in 1993 and '94, Tricky in 2001, and Heitham Al-Sayed in 2006. American nu metal band Limp Bizkit has also been known to have covered the song live.

== Opiate^{2} ==
"Opiate^{2}"

Single by Tool
- Released: March 1, 2022
- Genre: Progressive metal
- Length: 9:54
- Label: Tool Dissectional
- Songwriters: Danny Carey; Paul D'Amour; Adam Jones; Maynard James Keenan

Tool singles chronology
"Pneuma" (2020)	"Opiate^{2}" (2022)

"Opiate" was re-recorded and released as "Opiate^{2}" on March 1, 2022. It is four and a half minutes longer than the original and includes the same lyrics as the original version (with a few changes), plus a new bass intro, an extended instrumental midsection, and a new instrumental outro. A Blu-ray short film directed by Dominic Hailstone was released on March 18 to commemorate the EP's 30th anniversary. The commentary is provided by BenDeLaCreme and Jinkx Monsoon of RuPaul's Drag Race.

=== Charts ===
Chart performance for "Opiate^{2}"
Chart (2022)	Peak position
New Zealand Hot Singles (RMNZ)	34

== Personnel ==
Tool

- Maynard James Keenan – vocals
- Adam Jones – guitar, synthesizer (Opiate^{2})
- Paul D'Amour – bass guitar
- Danny Carey – drums
- Justin Chancellor – bass guitar (Opiate^{2})

Technical

- Sylvia Massy – production
- Steve Hansgen – production
- Tool – production (Opiate^{2})
- Toshi Kasai – engineering (Opiate^{2})
- "Evil" Joe Barresi – mixing (Opiate^{2})
- Bob Ludwig – mastering (Opiate^{2})
