= Tool (band) =

American rock band

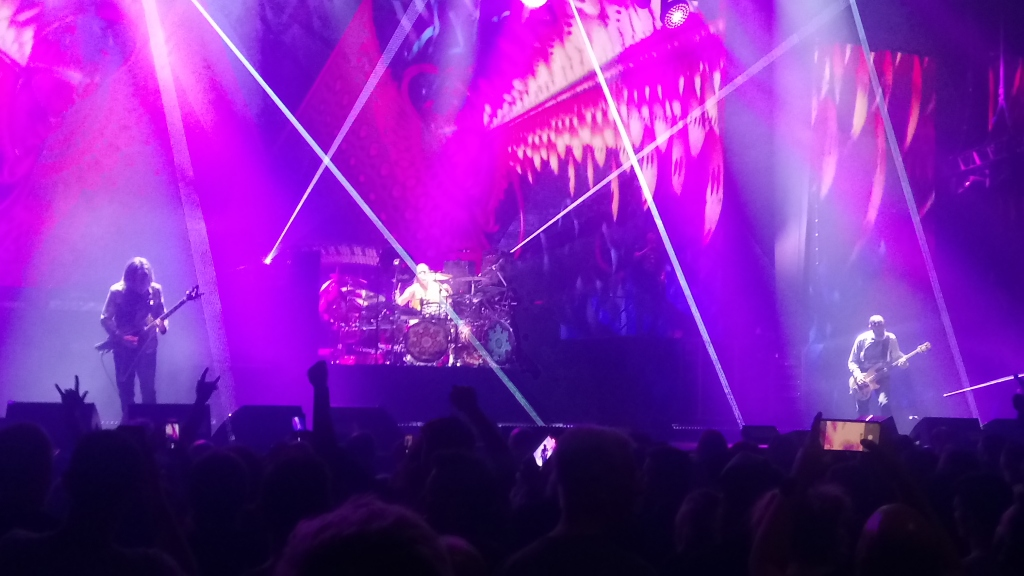
- Tool performing in 2022

Background information
- Origin: Los Angeles, California, U.S.
- Genres: Alternative metal; art rock; post-metal; progressive metal; progressive rock
- Works: Discography; tours
- Years active: 1990–present
- Labels: Tool Dissectional; Volcano; Zoo; RCA
- Spinoffs: A Perfect Circle; Puscifer
- Members: Maynard James Keenan; Adam Jones; Danny Carey; Justin Chancellor
- Past members: Paul D'Amour
- Website: toolband.com

Tool is an American rock band formed in Los Angeles in 1990. The group consists of vocalist Maynard James Keenan, guitarist Adam Jones, drummer Danny Carey and bassist Justin Chancellor, who replaced founding member Paul D'Amour in 1995. Tool has won four Grammy Awards, performed worldwide tours, and produced albums topping charts in several countries.

The band has released five studio albums, one EP and one box set. They emerged with a more classic heavy metal sound on their first studio album, Undertow (1993), before shifting and becoming a dominant act in the alternative metal and progressive metal movement with the release of their follow-up album Ænima in 1996. The group's efforts to combine musical experimentation, visual arts, and a message of personal evolution continued with Lateralus (2001) and 10,000 Days (2006), gaining critical acclaim and international commercial success. Their fifth studio album Fear Inoculum was released on August 30, 2019, to widespread critical acclaim. Prior to its release, the band had sold more than 13 million albums in the US alone.

Due to Tool's incorporation of visual arts and very long and complex releases, the band has been described as a style-transcending act and part of progressive rock, psychedelic rock, and art rock. The relationship between the band and the music industry is ambivalent, at times marked by censorship, and the band's insistence on privacy.

== History ==
=== Formation and Opiate (1989–1992) ===
Tool logo, 2006

During the 1980s, each of the future members of Tool moved to Los Angeles. Both Paul D'Amour and Adam Jones wanted to enter the film industry, while Maynard James Keenan, who had studied visual arts in Michigan, worked as a pet store remodeler. Danny Carey and Keenan performed for Green Jellÿ, and Carey played with Carole King and Pigmy Love Circus.

Keenan and Jones met through a mutual friend in 1989. After Keenan played Jones a tape recording of his previous band project, Jones was so impressed by his voice that he eventually talked his friend into forming a new band. They started jamming together while searching for a drummer and a bass player. Carey happened to live above Keenan and was introduced to Jones by Tom Morello, an old high school friend of Jones and former member of Electric Sheep. Carey began playing in their sessions because he "felt kinda sorry for them", as other invited musicians were not showing up. Tool's lineup was completed when a friend of Jones introduced the members to bassist D'Amour. Early on, the band fabricated the story that it formed because of the pseudophilosophy "lachrymology". Although "lachrymology" was also cited as an inspiration for the band's name, Keenan later explained the members' intentions differently: "Tool is exactly what it sounds like: It's a big dick. It's a wrench. ... we are ... your tool; use us as a catalyst in your process of finding out whatever it is you need to find out, or whatever it is you're trying to achieve."

After almost two years of practicing and performing locally in the Los Angeles area, the band was approached by record companies, and eventually signed a record deal with Zoo Entertainment. In March 1992, Zoo released the band's first effort, Opiate. Described by the band as "slam and bang" heavy music and the "hardest sounding" six songs they had written to that point, the EP included the singles "Hush" and "Opiate". The band's first music video, "Hush", promoted their dissenting views about the then-prominent Parents Music Resource Center and its advocacy of the censorship of music. The video featured the band members naked with their genitalia covered by Parental Advisory stickers and their mouths covered by duct tape. The band began touring with Rollins Band, Fishbone, Rage Against the Machine, White Zombie, and Corrosion of Conformity, to positive responses, which Janiss Garza of RIP Magazine summarized in September 1992 as a "buzz" and "a strong start".

=== Undertow (1993–1994) ===
The following year, at a time when alternative rock and grunge were at their height, Tool released their first full-length album, Undertow (1993). It expressed more diverse dynamics than Opiate and included songs the band had chosen not to publish on their previous release, when they had opted for a heavier sound. The band began touring again as planned, with an exception in May 1993. Tool was scheduled to play at the Garden Pavilion in Hollywood but learned at the last minute that the venue belonged to the Church of Scientology, which was perceived as a clash with "the band's ethics about how a person should not follow a belief system that constricts their development as a human being." Keenan "spent most of the show baa-ing like a sheep at the audience."

A band logo created by longtime collaborator Cam de Leon, this wrench is an example of "phallic hardware" in Tool's imagery.

Tool later played several concerts during the Lollapalooza festival tour, and was moved from the second stage to the main stage by the group's manager and the festival co-founder Ted Gardner. At the last concert of Lollapalooza in Tool's hometown Los Angeles, comedian Bill Hicks introduced the band. Hicks had become a friend of the band members and an influence on them after being mentioned in Undertow's liner notes. He jokingly asked the audience of 10,000 people to stand still and help him look for a lost contact lens. The boost in popularity gained from these concerts helped Undertow to be certified gold by the RIAA in September 1993 and to achieve platinum status in 1995, despite being sold with censored album artwork by distributors such as Wal-Mart. The single "Sober" became a hit single by March 1994 and won the band Billboard's "Best Video by a New Artist" award for the accompanying stop motion music video.

With the release of Tool's follow-up single "Prison Sex", the band again became the target of censorship. The song's lyrics and video dealt with child abuse, which sparked controversial reactions; Keenan's lyrics begin with: "It took so long to remember just what happened. I was so young and vestal then, you know it hurt me, but I'm breathing so I guess I'm still alive ... I've got my hands bound and my head down and my eyes closed and my throat wide open." The video was created primarily by guitarist Adam Jones, who saw it as his "surrealistic interpretation" of the subject matter. While some contemporary journalists praised the video and described the lyrics as "metaphoric", the American branch of MuchMusic (which asked Keenan to represent the band in a hearing) deemed the music video too graphic and obscene, and MTV stopped airing it after a few showings.

=== Ænima and Salival (1995–2000) ===
In September 1995, the band began writing and recording its second studio album. At that time Tool experienced its only lineup change to date, with bassist D'Amour leaving the band amicably to pursue other projects. According to Carey, D'Amour left the band because he wanted to play guitar rather than bass. Justin Chancellor, a member of former tourmate band Peach, eventually replaced D'Amour during the recording of the album, having been chosen over competitors such as Kyuss's Scott Reeder, Filter's Frank Cavanaugh, Pigmy Love Circus's E. Shepherd Stevenson, Jane's Addiction's Eric Avery, and ZAUM's Marco Fox.

On September 17, 1996, Tool released its second full-length album, Ænima (/ˈɑːnɪmə/ AH-ni-mə). The band enlisted the help of producer David Bottrill, who had produced some of King Crimson's albums, while Jones collaborated with Cam de Leon to create Ænima's Grammy-nominated artwork. The album was dedicated to stand-up comedian Bill Hicks, who had died two-and-a-half years earlier. The band intended to raise awareness about Hicks's material and ideas, because they felt that Tool and Hicks "were resonating similar concepts". In particular, Ænima's final track "Third Eye" is preceded by a clip of Hicks' performances, and the lenticular casing of the Ænima album packaging as well as the chorus of the title track "Ænema" make reference to a sketch from Hicks's Arizona Bay (the title track of the Arizona Bay Extended version of the album), in which he contemplates the idea of Los Angeles falling into the Pacific Ocean.

The first single, "Stinkfist", garnered limited airplay. It was shortened by radio programmers, MTV (U.S.) renamed the music video of "Stinkfist" to "Track No. 1" due to offensive connotations, and the lyrics of the song were altered. Responding to fan complaints about censorship, Matt Pinfield of MTV's 120 Minutes expressed regret on air by waving his fist in front of his face while introducing the video and explaining the name change.

"Ænema"
This Bill Hicks-inspired song won the 1998 Grammy Award for Best Metal Performance. The chorus, and the lyrics in this clip, of "Ænema" makes reference to the title track from Hicks's extended Arizona Bay album.

A tour began in October 1996, two weeks after Ænima's release. Following numerous appearances in the United States and Europe, Tool headed for Australia and New Zealand in late March 1997. Eventually returning to the United States, Tool appeared at Lollapalooza '97 in July, this time as a headliner, where they gained critical praise from The New York Times. Ænima eventually matched Tool's successful debut album in sales, and the progressive-influenced album landed the band at the head of the alternative metal genre. It featured the Grammy Award-winning "Ænema" and appeared on "Best Albums of 1996" lists in Kerrang! and Terrorizer. It was eventually certified triple platinum by the RIAA on March 4, 2003. In 1998, Tool joined the Ozzfest tour in the United States as the co-headliner act before Ozzy Osbourne. The band accepted on the condition that Melvins had to join it as well because, as stated by its frontman Buzz Osborne, they "wanted at least one band on the tour that they liked", despite the dissuasions from the tour organizers.

Two legal battles then began that interfered with the band's working on another release. Volcano Entertainment—the successor of Tool's by-then defunct label Zoo Entertainment—alleged contract violations by Tool and filed a lawsuit. According to Volcano, Tool had violated their contract when the band looked at offers from other record labels. After Tool filed a counter-suit stating that Volcano had failed to use a renewal option in their contract, the parties settled out of court. In December 1998 Tool agreed to a new contract, a three-record joint venture deal. Then in 2000, the band dismissed their long-time manager Ted Gardner, who then sued the band over his commission. During this time, Keenan joined the band A Perfect Circle, which was founded by long-time Tool guitar tech Billy Howerdel, while Jones joined The Melvins' Buzz Osborne and Carey drummed with Dead Kennedys' Jello Biafra on side projects. Although there were rumors that Tool was breaking up, Chancellor, Jones, and Carey were working on new material while waiting for Keenan to return. In 2000, the Salival box set (CD/VHS or CD/DVD) was released, effectively putting an end to the rumors. The CD contained one new original track, a cover of Led Zeppelin's "No Quarter", a live version of Peach's "You Lied", and revised versions of old songs. The VHS and the DVD each contained four music videos, plus a bonus music video for "Hush" on the DVD. Although Salival did not yield any singles, the hidden track "Maynard's Dick" (which dates back to the Opiate era) briefly found its way to FM radio when several DJs chose to play it on air under the title "Maynard's Dead".

=== Lateralus (2001–2005) ===
In January 2001, Tool announced a new album, Systema Encéphale, along with a 12-song track list containing titles such as "Riverchrist", "Numbereft", "Encephatalis", "Musick", and "Coeliacus". File-sharing networks such as Napster were flooded with bogus files bearing the titles' names. A month later, the band revealed that the new album was actually titled Lateralus; the name Systema Encéphale and the track list had been a ruse. Lateralus and the corresponding tours would take Tool a step further toward art rock and progressive rock territory. Rolling Stone wrote in an attempt to summarize the album that "Drums, bass and guitars move in jarring cycles of hyperhowl and near-silent death march ... The prolonged running times of most of Lateralus' thirteen tracks are misleading; the entire album rolls and stomps with suitelike purpose." Joshua Klein of The A.V. Club expressed his opinion that Lateralus, with its 79 minutes and relatively complex and long songs—topped by the ten-and-a-half-minute music video for "Parabola"—posed a challenge to fans and music programming alike.

"Schism"
"Schism" is the first single off Lateralus. With its abstract lyrics and multi-sectioned, odd-metered structure it has since become a signature song of the band.

The album became a worldwide success, reaching No.1 on the U.S. Billboard 200 albums chart in its debut week. Tool received their second Grammy Award for the best metal performance of 2001 for the song "Schism". During the band's acceptance speech, Carey stated that he would like to thank his parents (for putting up with him) and Satan, and bassist Chancellor concluded: "I want to thank my dad for doing my mom."

Extensive touring throughout 2001 and 2002 supported Lateralus and included a personal highlight for the band: a 10-show joint mini-tour with King Crimson in August 2001. Comparisons between the two were made, MTV describing the bands as "the once and future kings of progressive rock". Keenan stated of the minitour: "For me, being on stage with King Crimson is like Lenny Kravitz playing with Led Zeppelin, or Britney Spears onstage with Debbie Gibson." Although the end of the tour in November 2002 seemed to signal the start of another hiatus for the band, they did not become completely inactive. While Keenan recorded and toured with A Perfect Circle, the other band members released an interview and a recording of new material, both exclusive to the fan club. The "double vinyl four-picture disc" edition of Lateralus was first released as a limited autographed edition exclusively available to fan club members and publicly released on August 23, 2005. On December 20 the two DVDs were released, one containing the single "Schism" and the other "Parabola", a remix by Lustmord, and a music video with commentary by David Yow and Jello Biafra.

=== 10,000 Days (2006–2009) ===
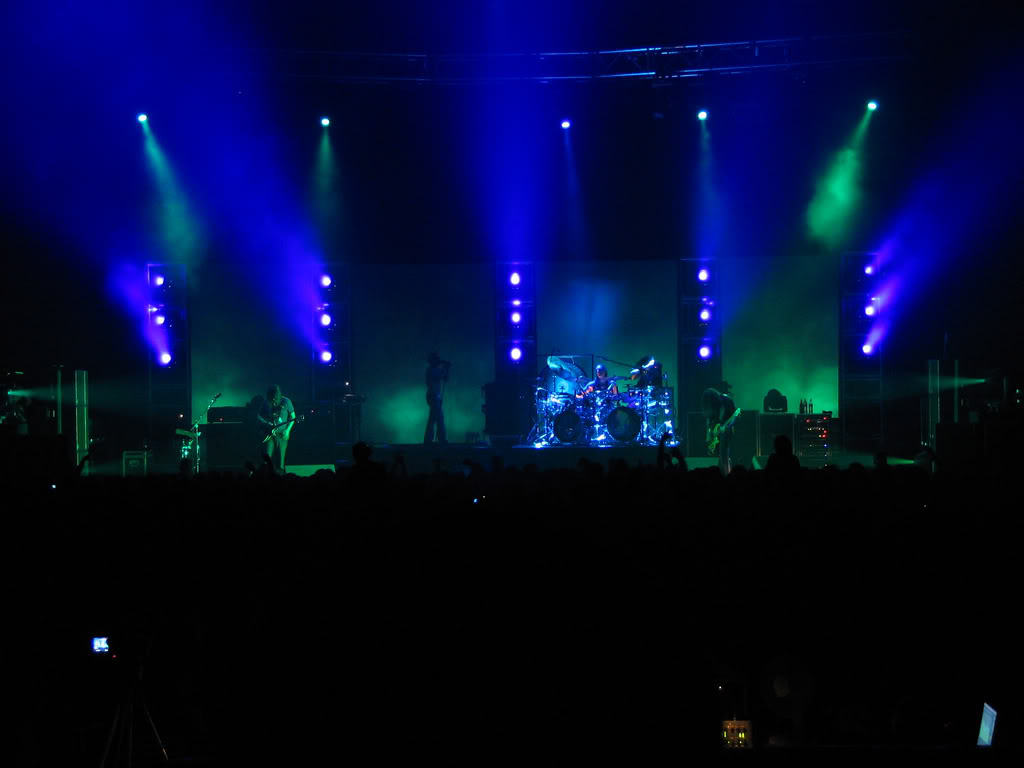
Tool live, in 2006

Fifteen years into the band's career, Tool had acquired what Dan Epstein of Revolver described as a devoted "cult" following, and as details about the band's next album emerged, such as the influence of Lateralus tourmates Fantômas and Meshuggah, controversy surrounding the new Tool album surfaced with speculation over song titles and pre-release rumors of leaked songs. Speculation over possible album titles was dismissed with a news item on the official Tool website, announcing that the new album's name was 10,000 Days. Nevertheless, speculation continued, with allegations that 10,000 Days was merely a "decoy" album to fool audiences. The rumor was proven false when a leaked copy of the album was distributed via filesharing networks a week prior to its official release.

The album opener, "Vicarious", premiered on U.S. radio stations on April 17, 2006. The album premiered on May 2 in the U.S. and debuted at the top spots of various international charts. 10,000 Days sold 564,000 copies in its opening week in the U.S. and was number one on the Billboard 200 charts, doubling the sales of Pearl Jam's self-titled album, its closest competitor. However, 10,000 Days was received less favorably by critics than its predecessor Lateralus.

Prior to the release of 10,000 Days, a tour kicked off at Coachella on April 30. The touring schedule was similar to the Lateralus tour of 2001; supporting acts were Isis and Mastodon. During a short break early the next year, after touring Australia and New Zealand, drummer Carey suffered a biceps tear during a skirmish with his girlfriend's dog, casting uncertainty on the band's upcoming concerts in North America. Carey underwent surgery on February 21 and several performances had to be postponed. Back on tour by April, Tool appeared on June 15 as a headliner at the Bonnaroo Music Festival with a guest appearance from Rage Against the Machine's Tom Morello on "Lateralus". Meanwhile, "Vicarious" was a nominee for Best Hard Rock Performance and 10,000 Days won Best Recording Package at the 49th Grammy Awards. The music video for "Vicarious" was released on DVD on December 18. The band's 2009 summer tour began on July 18 in Commerce City, Colorado, at the Mile High Music Festival. They headlined Lollapalooza 2009 and a show on August 22 for the Epicenter Festival in Pomona, California.

=== Fear Inoculum (2012–2022) ===
Their Tool Winter Tour played dates across the U.S. and Canada in January and February 2012. The band played at Ozzfest Japan on May 12, 2013. On July 15, 2014, Carey and Jones informed Rolling Stone that family commitments and an ongoing lawsuit are the key reasons for the delayed fifth album. Carey said to the music publication that one untitled track is "pretty much done". In March 2015, Jones revealed that the lawsuit had been settled in the band's favor, and as such, the band was turning their focus towards recording the album. He said that he hoped the album would be finished before the end of 2015 but emphasized that the band would not rush their work to meet an arbitrary deadline. In January 2016, Tool undertook a tour of the United States. While it was reported in February 2017 that Keenan had entered the studio to work on vocals for the fifth Tool album, it was later reported that the album was not scheduled for release in 2017. Still, the band announced a North American tour starting in May. A month later, Chancellor revealed that the new Tool album was "about 90-percent there", while Carey claimed in separate interviews that it would "definitely" be released in 2018. In February 2018, Jones revealed that Keenan was working on lyrics for the album, and that the band would begin recording in March. In June 2018, during his acceptance speech for the Icon Award at the Metal Hammer Golden Gods Awards, Keenan stated "I'll go on record now saying you're gonna see some new music next year."

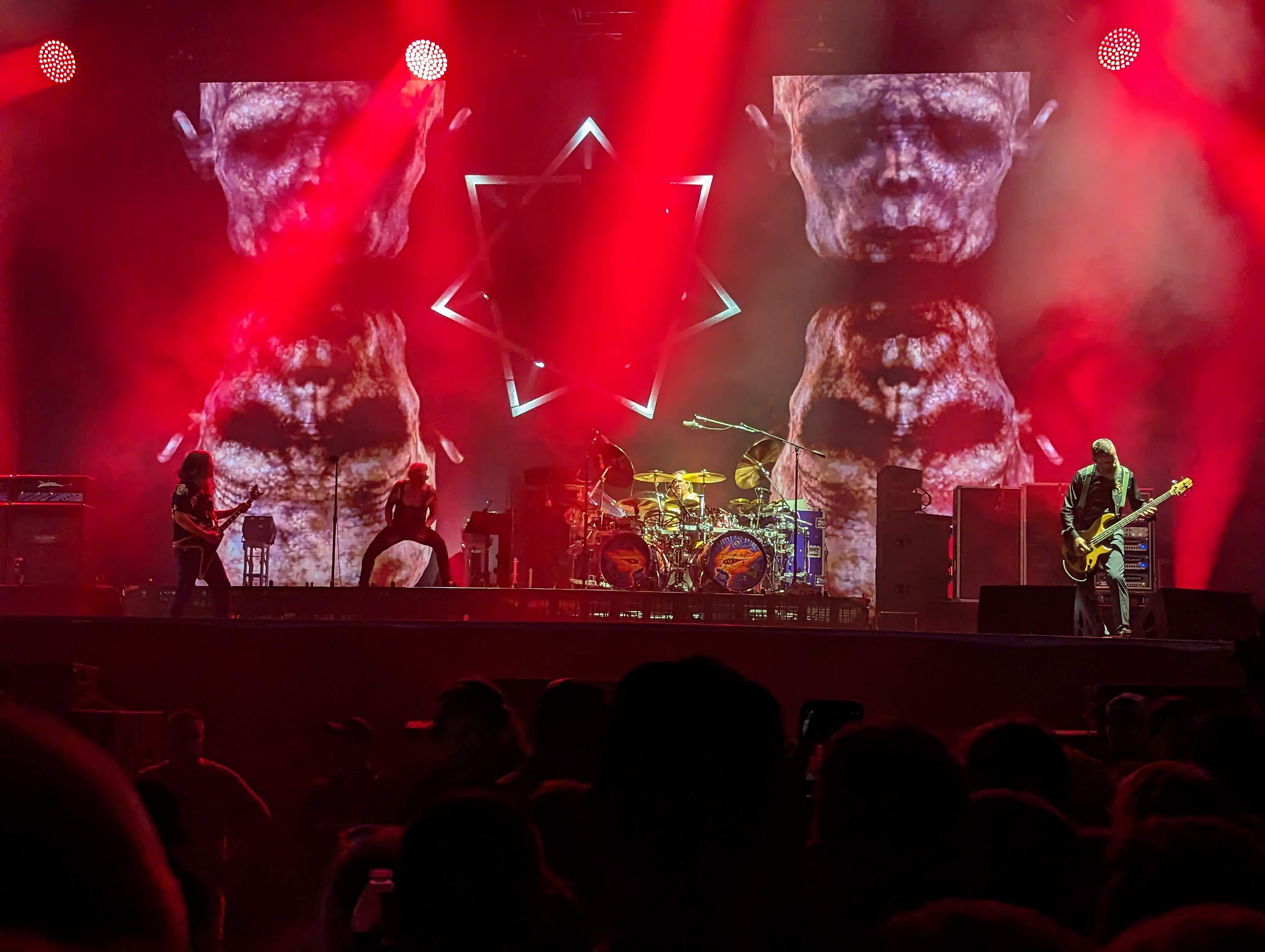
Tool performing at Welcome to Rockville 2023

On September 11, 2018, Keenan announced via Twitter that production on the record was progressing and that vocals had been written, before suggesting a 2019 release. In January 2019, Keenan announced that he had completed recording his vocals for the album "months ago." While Carey mentioned aiming for a mid-April release date, Keenan later explained that between May and July was a more realistic time frame to wrap up production and release the album. On May 5, 2019, the band debuted two new songs live at the Welcome to Rockville Festival in Jacksonville, Florida called "Descending" and "Invincible". Three days later, it was confirmed that the band's new album is scheduled to be released on August 30, 2019. On July 29, 2019, Keenan confirmed the album would be titled Fear Inoculum. The title track was released as a single on August 7, the band's first release in 13 years.

On August 2, 2019, Tool's discography (with the exception of Salival) became available on music streaming platforms. Tool was one of the last major holdouts to release their music digitally, as their record deal was signed before the rise in streaming and not revisited until before Fear Inoculum. The release resulted in every Tool release entering several international charts, breaking several Billboard chart records. Keenan later said he regretted not moving to streaming platforms sooner, as it reduced Tool's exposure to new audiences.

Fear Inoculum was launched on August 30 and became Tool's third U.S. number one. On January 26, 2020, the band won the Best Metal Performance for their song "7empest" at the 62nd Grammy Awards Their other nomination, "Fear Inoculum", lost the Best Rock Song category to Gary Clark Jr.

In June 2020, Tool canceled its upcoming North American tour after postponing a handful of dates due to the COVID-19 pandemic. The following August, Carey noted that the band had entered a hiatus, but that he still hoped they would reconvene in the future to record an EP, which the band would have more freedom in releasing due to no longer being signed to a record label. On October 27, 2020, an instrumental song titled "The Witness" was released featuring Jones, Chancellor, and Carey, and featuring production from Barresi, though the song was credited to Jones, not the band itself.

"Opiate" was re-recorded and released as "Opiate²" or "Opiate Squared" on March 1, 2022. It is almost twice as long as the original and includes the same lyrics as the live version, plus the extended instrumental midsection. A music video directed by Dominic Hailstone was released on March 18, 2022, to commemorate the EP's 30th anniversary.

=== Upcoming sixth studio album (2022–present) ===
In March 2022, Carey announced they were working on new material for their sixth studio album, noting that "..it won't take us this long for the next one. We even had some stuff left over from the last one that we'll develop. We have head starts on three or four new songs." In October 2023, Chancellor reiterated this, and noted he hoped the band would enter the studio to record in 2024 after finishing touring. In January 2024, Carey mentioned the new album has the possibility of having a shorter track lengths, noting that "we could just go back to doing an Undertow [type of] record. That's kind of appealing to me." In February 2025, Chancellor stated that Tool would "dedicate the next three months" in the studio to "organizing [their] ideas" for new music. In September 2025, Keenan said the band's plans for 2026 would be "Writing, I guess", while Jones mentioned having "lots of riffs" and plans to do a "dive deep soon" into the writing process for album six. In early 2026, Carey stated that the band is "working on a lot of new Tool songs now, hopefully [for release in] 2027, that’s the goal", in hopes of releasing it in tandem with a possible residency at the Sphere in Las Vegas. Jones later revealed that they were asked to be the first band to open the venue in 2023, but band politics prevented it from happening, and U2 was the first band instead.

== Artistry ==
=== Musical style and instrumentation ===
Tool's musical style has been described as alternative metal, art rock, post-metal, progressive rock, progressive metal, and heavy metal. Tool was described by Patrick Donovan of The Age as "the thinking person's metal band. Cerebral and visceral, soft and heavy, melodic and abrasive, tender and brutal, familiar and strange, western and eastern, beautiful and ugly, taut yet sprawling and epic, they are a tangle of contradictions." Tool has gained critical praise from the International Herald Tribune's C.B. Liddell for their complex and ever-evolving sound. Describing their general sound, AllMusic refers to them as "grinding, post-Jane's Addiction heavy metal", and The New York Times sees similarities to "Led Zeppelin's heaving, battering guitar riffs and Middle Eastern modes". Their 2001 work Lateralus was compared by AllMusic to Pink Floyd's Meddle (1971), but thirty years later and altered by "Tool's impulse to cram every inch of infinity with hard guitar meat and absolute dread". Tool had been labelled as post-metal in 1993 and 1996, as well as in 2006, after the term came into popularity. A component of Tool's song repertoire relies on the use of unusual time signatures. For instance, Chancellor describes the time signature employed on the first single from Lateralus, "Schism", as "six" and "six-and-a-half" and that it later "goes into all kinds of other times". Further examples include the album's title track, which also displays shifting rhythms, as do 10,000 Days: "Wings for Marie (Pt 1)" and "10,000 Days (Wings Pt 2)".

Beyond this aspect of the band's sound, each band member experiments within his wide musical scope. Bass Player magazine described Chancellor's bass playing as having a "thick midrange tone, guitar-style techniques, and elastic versatility". As an example of this, the magazine mentioned the use of a wah effect by hammering "the notes with the left hand and using the bass's tone controls to get a tone sweep", such as on the song "The Patient", from Lateralus.

Completing the band's rhythm section, drummer Carey uses polyrhythms, tabla-style techniques, and the incorporation of custom electronic drum pads to trigger samples, such as prerecorded tabla and octoban sounds.

Keenan's ability as a vocalist has been characterized more subjectively by the Seattle Post-Intelligencer: After his performance during an Alice in Chains reunion concert in 2005, freelancer Travis Hay saw him as "a natural fit at replacing Layne Staley". Regarding his role in A Perfect Circle and Tool, The New York Times wrote that "both groups rely on Mr. Keenan's ability to dignify emotions like lust, anger and disgust, the honey in his voice adding a touch of profundity".

"Lateralus"
The number of syllables per line in the lyrics to "Lateralus" correspond to an arrangement of the Fibonacci numbers.

According to Guitar Player magazine, Jones does not rely on any one particular guitar-playing technique but rather combines many techniques. For example, AllMusic wrote that he "alternately utiliz[es] power chords, scratchy noise, chiming arpeggios, and a quiet minimalism" in "Sober". Additionally, the band uses forms of instrumental experimentation, like the use of a "pipe bomb microphone" (a guitar pickup mounted inside a brass cylinder) and a talk box guitar solo on "Jambi".

The band puts an emphasis on the sound of their songs and attempts to reduce the effect lyrics can have on the perception of songs by not releasing song lyrics with their albums, although they eventually released the lyrics for Fear Inoculum for that album's CD. Lyrical arrangements are often given special attention, such as in "Lateralus". The number of syllables per line in the lyrics to "Lateralus" correspond to an arrangement of the Fibonacci numbers and the song "Jambi" uses and makes a reference to the common metrical foot iamb. The lyrics on Ænima and Lateralus focus on philosophy and spirituality—specific subjects range from organized religion in "Opiate", to evolution and Jungian psychology in "Forty-Six & 2" and transcendence in "Lateralus". On 10,000 Days, Keenan wanted to explore issues more personal to him: the album name and title track refer to the twenty-seven years during which his mother suffered from complications of a stroke until her death in 2003.

=== Influences ===
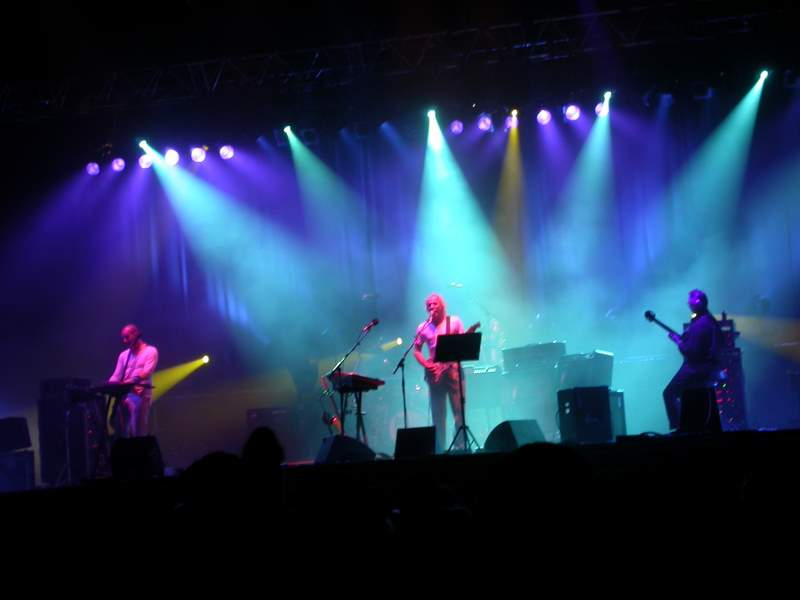
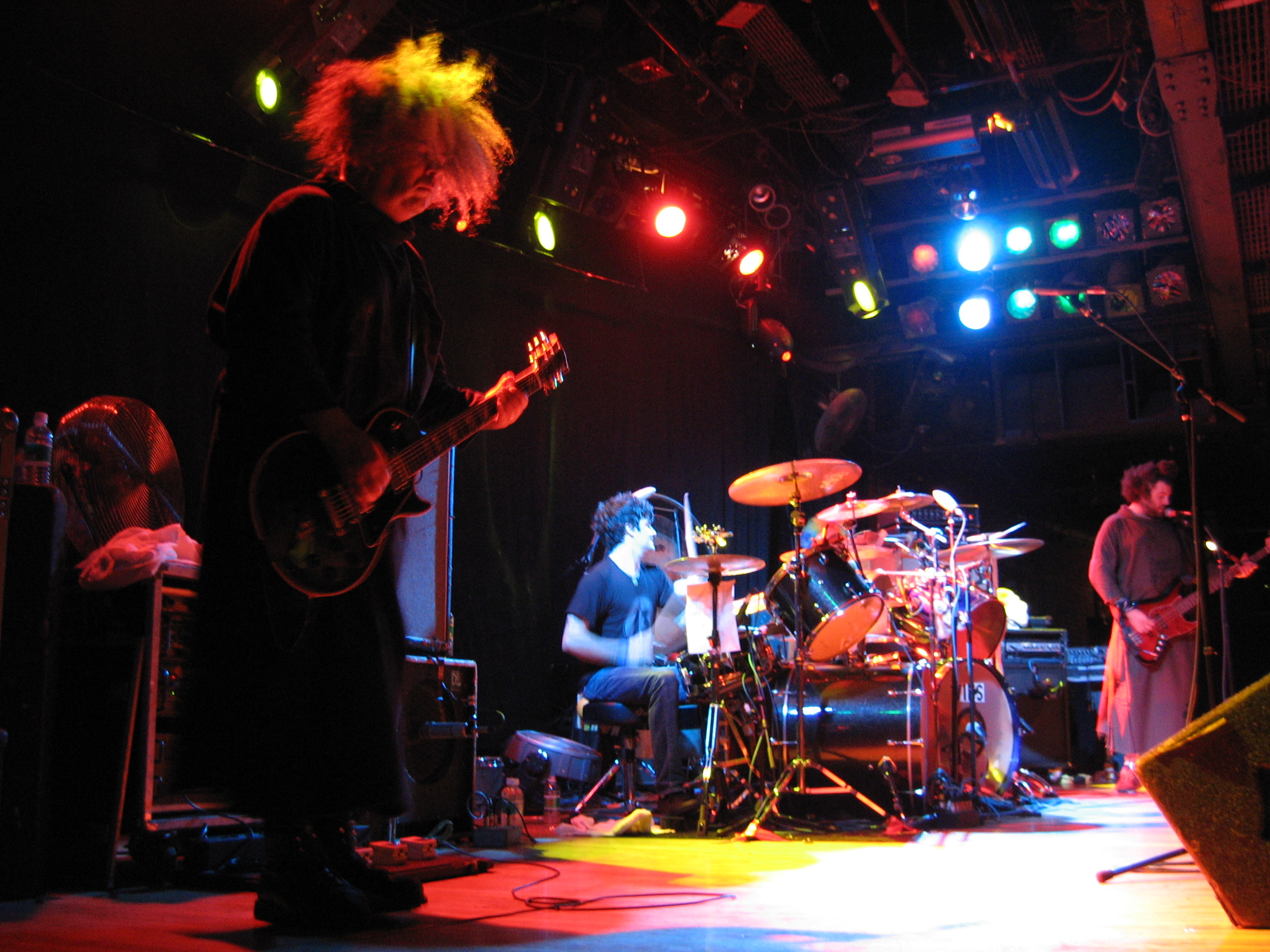
King Crimson (left) and Melvins (right) were major influences on Tool.

In 1997, Tool named King Crimson, Melvins, and Peter Gabriel's Passion as influences. (Note: Tool tried out several well known producers for Ænima, before they settled on David Bottrill based on his wide-ranging work with King Crimson and Peter Gabriel. Bottrill reprised his role on Lateralus, followed by Joe Barresi on the next two records because of Tool's admiration for his production on Stag and Honky by the Melvins.) In describing their wide range of styles, critics have noted that they are "influenced as much by Pink Floyd as by the Sex Pistols." In a 1993 interview, Adam Jones mentioned Joni Mitchell, King Crimson, Depeche Mode, and country music as being among their inspirations. In 1997, Maynard James Keenan named Hejira by Joni Mitchell, Holy Money/Greed by Swans, Physical Graffiti by Led Zeppelin, Red by King Crimson, and Passion by Peter Gabriel as his five favorite records. Danny Carey cited Neil Peart from Rush, Bill Bruford and Alan White of Yes as his biggest rock influences, in addition to Bruford's adventurousness in electronic drums. In the same way, Jones stated that Robert Fripp's performances with King Crimson caused him to "wake up" to music as a teen. Furthermore, he acknowledged the other King Crimson guitarists, Adrian Belew and Trey Gunn, along with Buzz Osborne from the Melvins, as his biggest influences.

Tool have constantly expressed the massive impact that progressive rock pioneers King Crimson have had on their music; on a 2001 tour with them, Keenan joked: "Now you know who we ripped off. Just don't tell anyone, especially the members of King Crimson." Carey said that listening to the Discipline album upon its 1981 release "revolutionized" his musical perspective in terms of polyrhythms and the balance between the instruments. In 1997, Keenan explained how the composition process of Tool reflected that of King Crimson: "They're very much into listening to each other; even though they might have a basic structure that they're following, it's about fitting themselves in with each other." Contrary to these statements, longtime King Crimson member Robert Fripp has downplayed any influence his band had on Tool. In an interview, Fripp touched on how the two bands relate to each other, stating "Do you hear the influence? There's just one figure where I hear an influence, just one. It was a piece we were developing that we dropped. And it's almost exactly the same figure: three note arpeggio with a particular accent from the guitar. So I do not think you could have heard it. That's the only thing." He also said,

I happen to be a Tool fan. The members of Tool have been generous enough to suggest that Crimson has been an influence on them. Adam Jones asked me if I could detect it in their music, and I said I couldn't. I can detect more Tool influence in King Crimson than I can hear King Crimson in Tool. (Note: Fripp's self-effacing attitude toward his legacy is not rare; English musician Steven Wilson stated that after "ripping off" an entire section of "Lizard" by King Crimson in his song "Raider II", everyone picked up on it, except Fripp.)

The band's long build-ups of intensity were largely inspired by the Melvins. The latter's influence on Tool is most explicit in Undertow, and some authors have described Tool's music as a progressive take on Melvins. On the other hand, Keenan's exotic modulations were influenced by world music; in his twenties, the singer was immersed in that type of music, thus when Peter Gabriel reunited several musicians whom Keenan already knew of for The Last Temptation of Christ soundtrack, which mixed their traditional styles with modern ambient music, it became a major revelation for him.

Other reported influences of Tool include Fantômas, Devo, Bill Hicks, Rush, Helmet, Faith No More, Bauhaus, Meshuggah, David Bowie, Black Sabbath, Mike Patton, Dave Lombardo, and Jane's Addiction.

== Visual arts ==
Part of Tool's work as a band is to incorporate influences of other works of art in their music videos, live shows, and album packaging. Adam Jones doubles as the band's art director and director of their music videos. Another expression of this is an official website "dedicated to the arts and influences" on the band.

=== Music videos ===
Screenshot from the "Sober" music video, directed by Adam Jones and Fred Stuhr

The band has released eight music videos but made personal appearances in only the first two, which the band states is to prevent people from "latching onto the personalities involved rather than listening to the music." With the exception of "Hush" and "Vicarious" all of Tool's music videos feature stop motion animation to some extent. The videos are created primarily by Adam Jones, often in collaboration with artists such as Chet Zar, Alex Grey, and Osseus Labyrint.

The "Sober" music video in particular attracted much attention. Jones explained that it does not contain a storyline, but that his intentions were to summon personal emotions with its imagery. Rolling Stone described this imagery as "evil little men dwell in a dark dungeon with meat coursing through pipes in the wall" and called it a "groundbreaking", "epic" clip. Billboard voted it "Best Video by a New Artist".

The video for "Vicarious" was released on DVD on December 18, 2007. The video is the first by Tool to be produced entirely through the use of CGI.

=== Album artwork ===
Jones is responsible for most of the band's artwork concepts. The album Undertow features a ribcage sculpture by Jones on its cover and photos contributed by the band members. Later albums included artwork by collaborating artists: Ænima and Salival featured works by Cam de Leon; Lateralus and 10,000 Days were created with the help of Alex Grey. The releases garnered positive critical reception, with a music journalist of the Associated Press attributing to the band a reputation for innovative album packaging.

Both Ænima and 10,000 Days were nominated for the Grammy Award for Best Recording Package, but while the former failed to win in 1997, the latter did win in 2007. Jones created packaging for 10,000 Days that features a pair of stereoscopic lenses for viewing 3-D artwork and photos. Jones, a lifelong fan of stereoscopic photography, wanted the packaging to be unique and to reflect the 1970s artwork he appreciates. The CD packaging for Fear Inoculum included a rechargeable 4 inch HD video screen and a speaker which played a hidden track along with a video when opened and also included a 36-page booklet.

=== Live shows ===
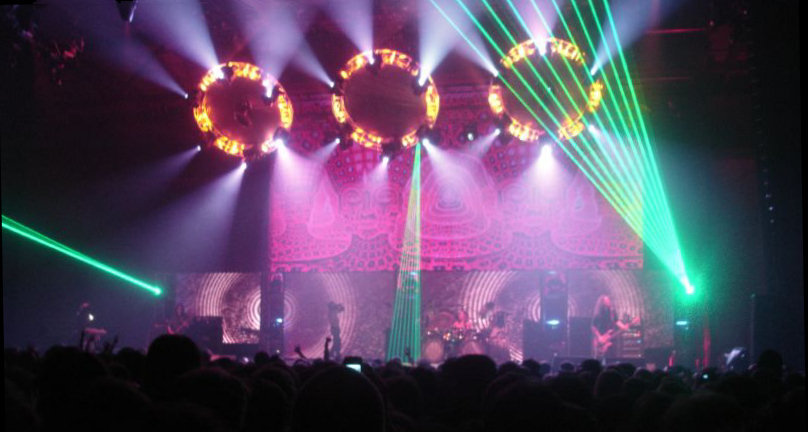
Tool's live performances in 2006 included an elaborate light show using 10,000 Days artwork by painter Alex Grey as a backdrop.

Following its first tours in the early 1990s, Tool has performed as a headline act in world tours and major festivals such as Lollapalooza (1997 and 2009), Coachella (1999 and 2006), Voodoo Fest (2001 and 2016), Download Festival (2006 and 2019), Roskilde (2001 and 2006), Big Day Out (2007 and 2011), Bonnaroo (2007 and 2022), All Points West Music & Arts Festival (2009), and Epicenter (2009). They have been joined on stage by numerous artists such as Buzz Osborne and Scott Reeder on several occasions; Tom Morello and Zack de la Rocha during their 1991 tour; Layne Staley in Hawaii, 1993; Tricky, Robert Fripp, Mike Patton, Dave Lombardo, Brann Dailor of Mastodon, and experimental arts duo Osseus Labyrint during their 2001–02 Lateralus tour; and Kirk Hammett, Phil Campbell, Serj Tankian, and Tom Morello during their 2006–07 tour. They have covered songs by Led Zeppelin, Ted Nugent, Peach, Kyuss, the Dead Kennedys, and the Ramones.

Live shows on Tool's headline tour incorporate an unorthodox stage setting and video display. Keenan and Carey line up in the back on elevated platforms, while Jones and Chancellor stand in the front, toward the sides of the stage. Keenan often faces the backdrop or the sides of the stage rather than the audience. No followspots or live cameras are used; instead, the band employs extensive backlighting to direct the focus away from the band members and toward large screens in the back and the crowd. Breckinridge Haggerty, the band's live video designer, says that the resulting dark spaces on stage "are mostly for Maynard". He explains, "[a] lot of the songs are a personal journey for him and he has a hard time with the glare of the lights when he's trying to reproduce these emotions for the audience. He needs a bit of personal space, and he feels more comfortable in the shadows." The big screens are used to play back "looped clips that aren't tracked to a song like a music video. The band has never used any sort of timecode. They’ve always made sure the video can change on-the-fly, in a way that can be improvised. ... The show is never the same twice." During the 10,000 Days tour, the video material consisted of over six hours of material, created by Jones, his wife Camella Grace, Chet Zar, Meats Meier, and Haggerty. Some of the material created by Zar has been released on his DVD Disturb the Normal.

== Legacy and impact ==
Writers HP Newquist and Rich Maloof attribute to Tool an influence on modern metal in their book The New Metal Masters. Sean Richardson of The Boston Phoenix sees System of a Down, Deftones, and Korn as examples of Tool's "towering influence" on the genre. Keenan's style of singing has been seen as heavily influencing artists such as Pete Loeffler of Chevelle, Benjamin Burnley of Breaking Benjamin, Will Martin of Earshot, and Fred Durst of Limp Bizkit. Tool was referred to as one of the "Big Four" of 1990s heavy metal by Lauryn Schaffner of Loudwire, along with Sepultura, Korn, and Pantera.

== Band members ==
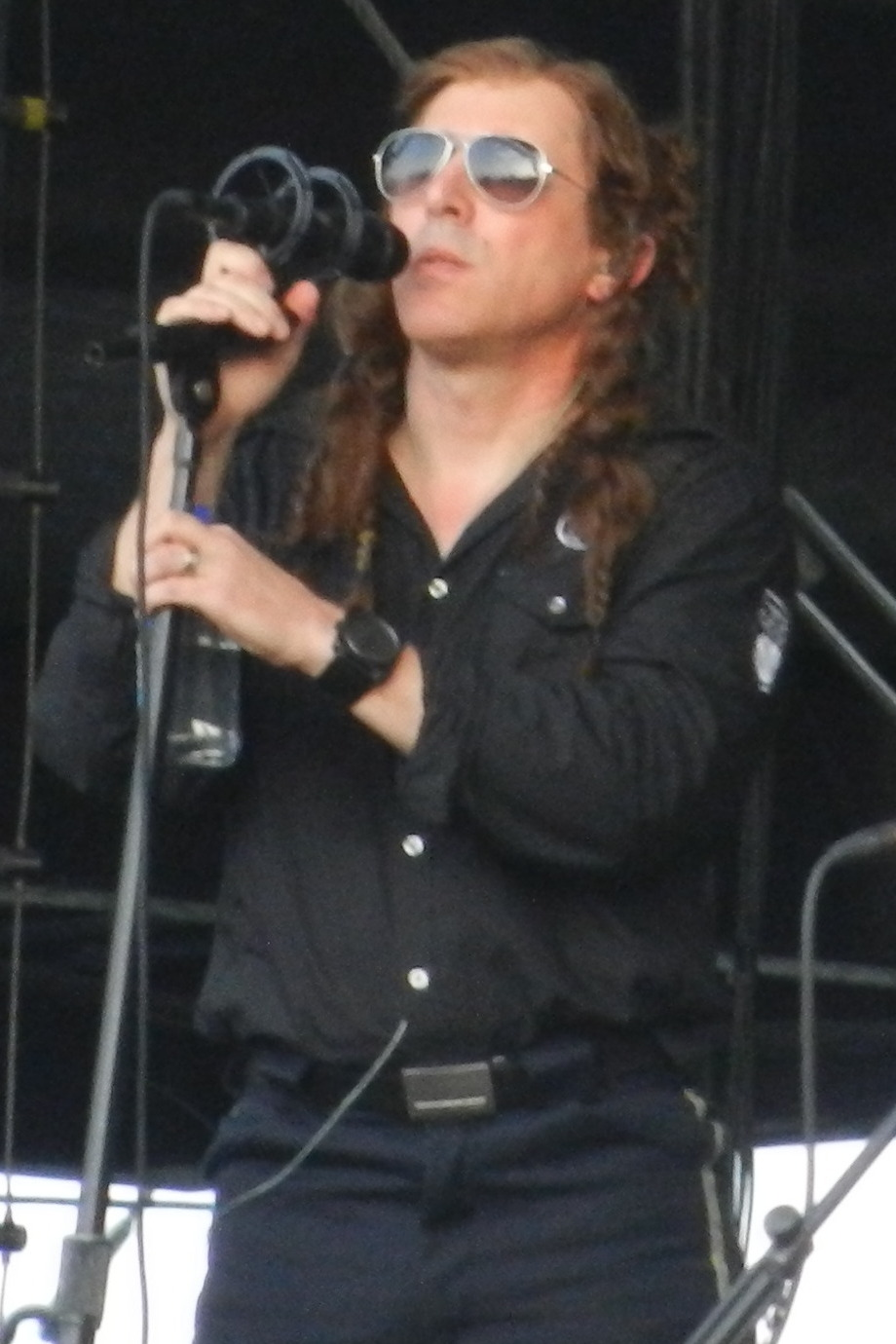
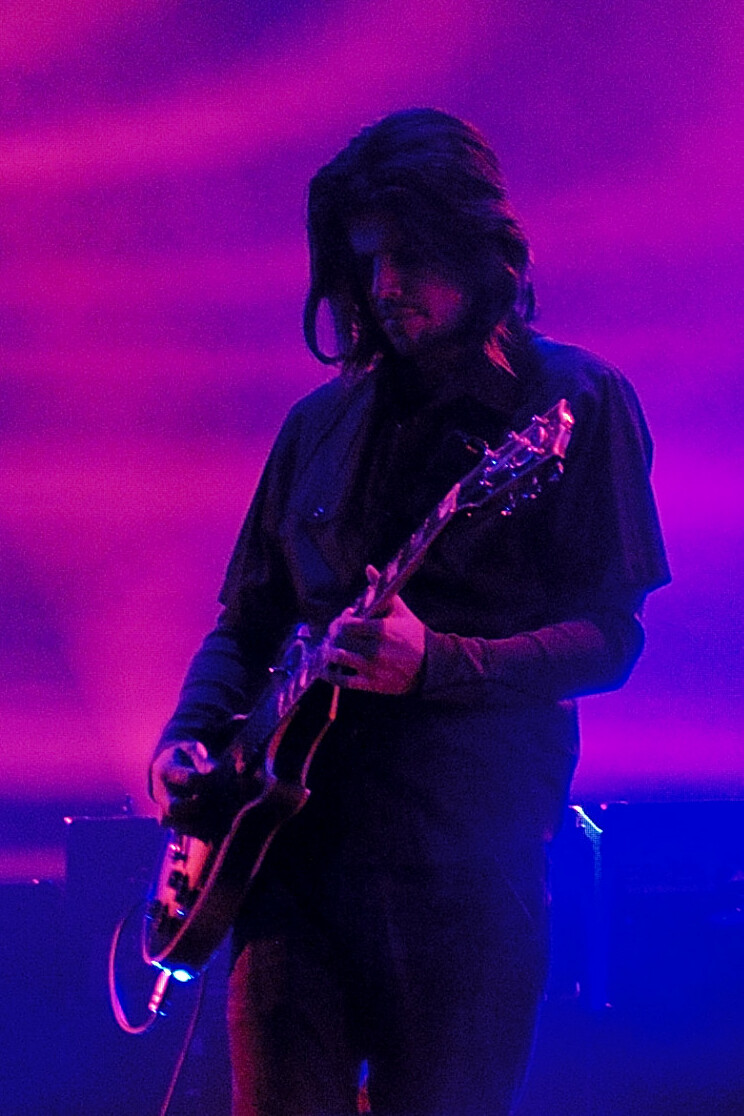
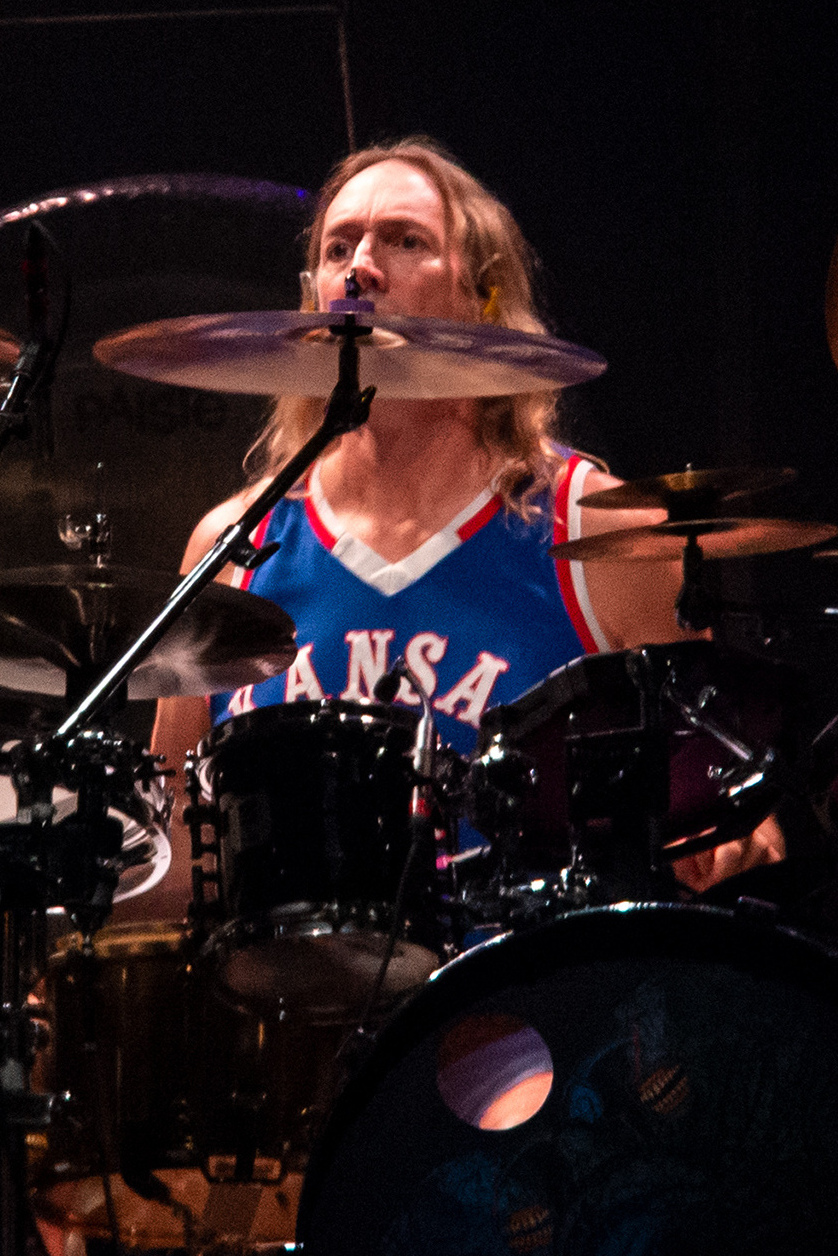
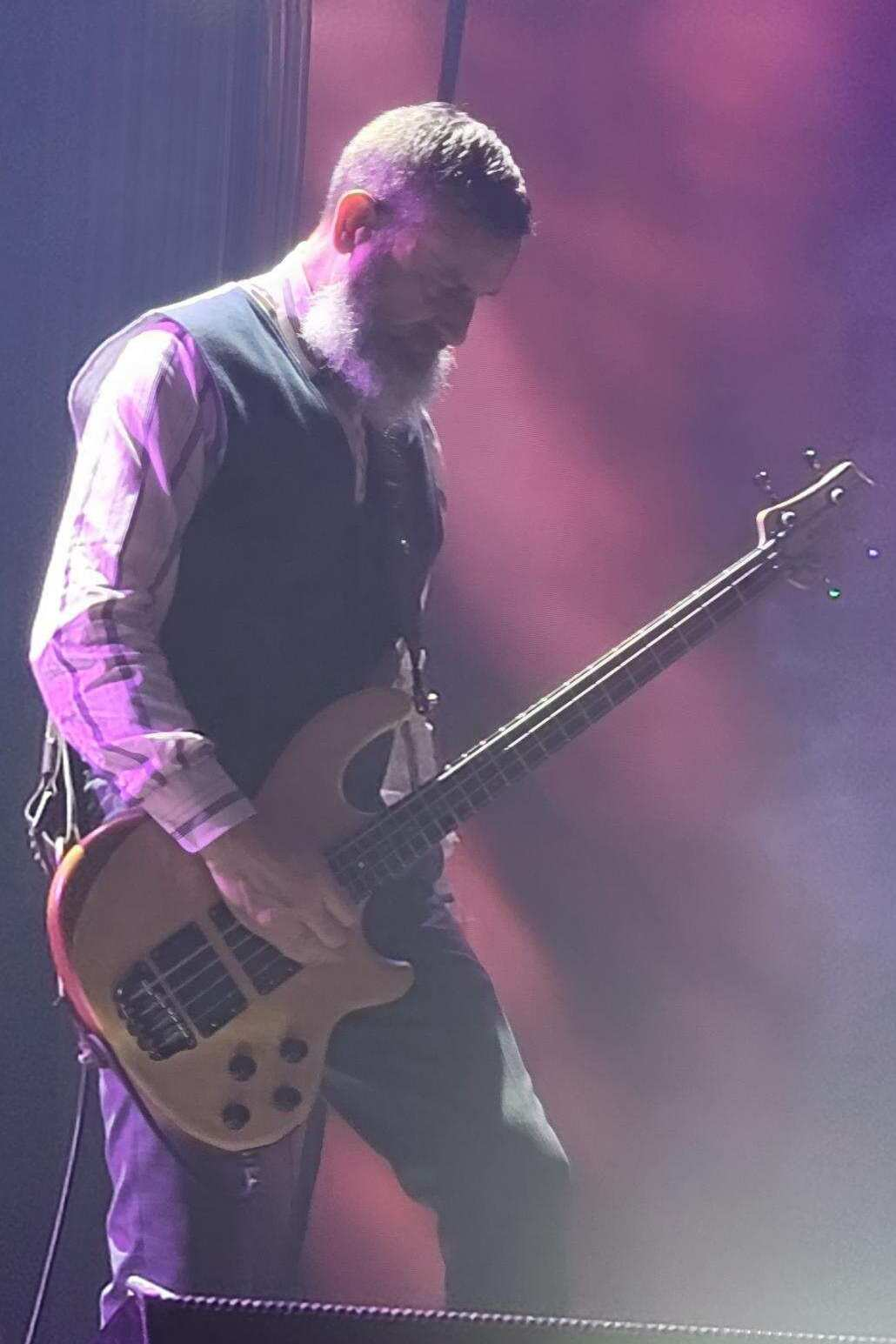
Members of Tool. From left to right: Maynard James Keenan, Adam Jones, Danny Carey and Justin Chancellor

Current

- Maynard James Keenan – vocals (1990–present)
- Adam Jones – guitars (1990–present)
- Danny Carey – drums, percussion (1990–present), samples (1995–present)
- Justin Chancellor – bass (1995–present)

Former

- Paul D'Amour – bass (1990–1995)

== Awards and nominations ==
Award	Year	Nominee(s)	Category	Result	Ref.
AMFT Awards	2019	"7empest"	Best Metal Performance	Won	
Billboard Music Awards	2020	Fear Inoculum	Top Rock Album	Won	
Billboard Music Awards	2020	Tool	Top Rock Artist	Nominated	
Echo Music Prize	2007	Tool	Best International Alternative	Nominated	
Grammy Awards	1997	Ænima	Best Recording Package	Nominated	
Grammy Awards	1998	"Ænema"	Best Metal Performance	Won	
Grammy Awards	1998	"Stinkfist"	Best Music Video	Nominated	
Grammy Awards	2002	"Schism"	Best Metal Performance	Won	
Grammy Awards	2007	10,000 Days	Best Recording Package	Won	
Grammy Awards	2007	"Vicarious"	Best Hard Rock Performance	Nominated	
Grammy Awards	2008	"The Pot"	Best Hard Rock Performance	Nominated	
Grammy Awards	2020	"7empest"	Best Metal Performance	Won	
Grammy Awards	2020	"Fear Inoculum"	Best Rock Song	Nominated	
Hungarian Music Awards	2007	10,000 Days	Best Foreign Rock Album	Nominated	
iHeartRadio Music Awards	2020	Fear Inoculum	Top Rock Album	Won	
MTV Video Music Awards	1994	"Prison Sex"	Best Special Effects in a Video	Nominated	
Music Week Awards	2020	Tool	PR Campaign	Nominated	
Pollstar Concert Industry Awards	2002	Tour	Most Creative Stage Production	Nominated	

== Discography ==
- Undertow (1993)
- Ænima (1996)
- Lateralus (2001)
- 10,000 Days (2006)
- Fear Inoculum (2019)
