= Benny Mardones (album) =

Studio album by Benny Mardones
- Released: September 6, 1989
- Studio: The Village Recorder (Los Angeles, California); The Pasha Music House (Hollywood, California); Can-Am Recorders (Tarzana, California); Calliope Studios (New York City, New York); EBS Studios (South Carolina)
- Genre: AOR
- Length: 43:22
- Label: Curb
- Producer: Michael Lloyd; Duane Evans; Benny Mardones; Mark Mangold

Benny Mardones chronology
Too Much to Lose (1981)	Benny Mardones (1989)	Stand by Your Man (1996)

Benny Mardones is the fourth studio album from American singer Benny Mardones, which was released by Curb in 1989. Produced by Michael Lloyd, it was Mardones' first album since 1981's Too Much to Lose, following his battle with a drug addiction and other personal issues. The album was recorded and released after the successful reissue of Mardones' 1980 hit song "Into the Night".

== Background ==
In 1989, a "Where Are They Now?" Arizona radio segment spurred Los Angeles DJ Scott Shannon to add "Into the Night" to his playlist. The exposure ultimately rocketed the song back into the national charts, where it reached No. 20 in the first week of July 1989. The re-entry added 17 weeks to its previous run of 20, amounting to a total 37 (non consecutive) weeks, breaking the record set by Laura Branigan with her single "Gloria", which charted for 36 (consecutive) weeks from July 1982 to March 1983, for the longest-charting single of the 1980s by a solo artist.

The second wave of success of "Into the Night" resulted in Mardones signing with Curb Records. With his new deal came the return of Joel Diamond as Mardones' manager. He soon recorded a new studio album, which included the new re-recorded version of "Into the Night". The self-titled album, or "the blue album" as referred to by Mardones' fans, was released to little success as Curb was best known for being a country label and was not able to capitalize on the success of the "Into the Night".

For the album, Mardones mainly wrote tracks with Mark Mangold and Duane Evans. The album is the first where Mardones' son Michael Everett Mardones is listed as a backup singer. "How Could You Love Me" would later be re-recorded for Mardones' 1996 album Stand by Your Man and his 2002 album A Journey Through Time.

In a 1989 interview, Mardones was asked if he ever wondered about Curb's ability to market him on their country-orientated label:

"Well, I think they ran into problems. I think they've made a lot of mistakes on this last album, but I think that they're learning and they're re-structuring their company, their distribution and promotion situation, because they haven't been in the rock 'n' roll place and that's what they're attempting to do. They want me to be the cornerstone of the label. Meanwhile, I'm not going to allow too many more mistakes to be made at my expense. They haven't made mistakes, but I think the promotion fell short. I have no complaints about Curb Records. They treat me like gold. Mike Curb is a wonderful human being. The people at Curb Records are in my corner a hundred and fifty per cent. All we're doing is getting through the rough spots. We're looking forward to a wonderful 1990. We're looking forward to a wonderful relationship with one another. I think that certain errors were made as far as the promotion of the record, but I think they were innocent mistakes. No malice intended."

== Release ==
The album was originally released on CD and vinyl in America and Europe. To promote the album in Europe, Curb released the album's new version of "Into the Night" as a single. In North America, "I Never Really Loved You at All" and "I'll Be Good to You" were released as singles, with the former also being released as a promotional single in the UK.

== Critical reception ==
Professional ratings
Review scores
Source	Rating
AllMusic	2.5/5 stars

Mike DeGagne of AllMusic praised Mardones' vocals on the album, describing them as "enchanting and smooth", but felt the material was "all meek love songs backed by hollow guitar and keyboards". He added that "all the ballads sound similar and could have been colored with some bulkier lyrics or even some tempo changes". DeGagne picked the re-recorded version of "Into the Night" as the album's strongest track and noted it has a "more seductive feel" than the 1980 original.

== Track listing ==
No.	Title	Writer(s)	Length
1.	"I Never Really Loved You at All"	Benny Mardones, Mark Mangold	4:28
2.	"For a Little Ride"	Mardones, Mangold	3:43
3.	"How Could You Love Me"	Mardones, Duane Evans	4:47
4.	"Into the Night (re-recording)"	Mardones, Robert Tepper	4:22
5.	"We've Got to Run"	Mardones, Evans	4:40
6.	"I'll Be Good to You"	Mark Spiro, Steve Kipner	4:03
7.	"If You Loved Me"	Mardones, Evans	4:09
8.	"Never Far Away"	Al Frisch, Mardones, Mangold	3:57
9.	"Close to the Flame"	Mardones, Mangold	4:56
10.	"Run to You"	Mardones, Evans	4:13

== Personnel ==
- Benny Mardones – vocals, backing vocals (1, 4, 5, 7–9), arrangement (1–3, 5, 8, 10)
- Duane Evans – keyboards (1, 3, 8, 10), guitar (1, 3, 8, 10), backing vocals (2–5, 7, 10), arrangement (3, 5, 7, 10), piano (4), all instruments (5, 7)
- Mark Mangold – keyboards (1, 2, 8), arrangement (1, 2, 8–10), synthesizer (9), drums (9)
- Michael Lloyd – arrangement (1–3, 6, 8, 10), programming (3), synthesizer (6), drums (6)
- Bobby Martin – Hammond organ (2), saxophone (3)
- Claude Gaudette – keyboards (8)
- Dave Amato – guitar (1, 2, 8, 9), backing vocals (2, 3, 10)
- Ron Bloom – guitar (4)
- Michael Thompson – guitar (6)
- John Pierce – bass (1–3, 8, 10)
- Dennis Belfield – bass (4, 6, 9)
- Jeff Porcaro – drums (1–3, 8, 10)
- Ron Krasinski – drums (4)
- Alex Acuña – percussion (1, 8)
- Al Fritsch – backing vocals (1, 8, 9), guitar (9)
- Gary Falcone – backing vocals (2, 3, 10)
- Michael Everett Mardones – backing vocals (5)

=== Production ===
- Michael Lloyd – production (1–4, 6–10), mixing
- Duane Evans – production (5, 7)
- Benny Mardones – production (5)
- Mark Mangold – production (9)
- Carmine Rubino – engineering, mixing
- Dan Nebenzal – additional engineering, mixing
- John Valentino – engineering assistance
- Hanspeter Huber – mixing
- Toby Wright – mixing assistance
- Charlie Pollack – mixing assistance
- Steve Hall – mastering
- Debbie Lytton – production coordination
- Jeni Lytton – production coordination
- Marguerite Luciani – album coordination
- Jeff Katz – cover photography
- Wilson Design Group – art direction
