= The True Oldies Channel =

American radio music network

- Type: Radio network
- Country: United States

Ownership
- Owner: The True Oldies Channel / Scott Shannon (Distributed by Local Radio Networks)
- Key people: Scott Shannon, host

History
- Launch date: April 1, 2004

Coverage
- Availability: National

Links
- Website: trueoldieschannel.com

Scott Shannon's True Oldies Channel (also known more recently as The True Oldies Channel: Greatest Hits) is a radio network begun in the spring of 2004. Originally distributed by ABC Radio Networks via satellite, the service plays a hybrid oldies/classic hits format comprising music mostly from 1964 to 1979; it also plays selected cuts from the 1955-1963 era and also from the 1980s. As of September 22, 2016, it was distributed via United Stations Radio Networks. Since September 2023 it is distributed by Local Radio Networks.

Prior to June 30, 2014, the service had over 100 affiliate stations across the United States. The service is available 24 hours a day online. Some stations ran the format full-time 24/7 while a few others ran it on overnights only. Many member stations, however, generally break away from the program feed at some points during the day to air some local programming, either a local morning show, a local afternoon show, or both; Cumulus also offered Imus in the Morning for The True Oldies Channel affiliates.

Scott Shannon was the founder, namesake and sole on-air personality (heard at all hours through voice-tracking) at the True Oldies Channel from its founding until he departed Cumulus Media (which had acquired Citadel Broadcasting in 2011, the company that in turn had bought ABC's radio assets in 2007) in February 2014. Weekend and guest hosts included Robby Bridges, Blake Hayes, Jay Michaels and Beaver Cleaver. In March 2014, Westwood One, the service's syndicator, announced it was canceling distribution of the channel at the end of June 2014, with no exact date announced, and planned to replace the service with "Good Time Oldies," a brand previously used by Jones Radio Networks as recently as the mid-2000s. Shannon confirmed the news through the network's Facebook page, but said the network and format is still available for streaming online. Shannon also hinted the possibility of "The True Oldies Channel" returning to the radio airwaves soon. It was unknown at the time who the network's new distributor would be, although SkyView Networks (which is also taking over distribution of ABC's other radio programs in 2015) was a possible candidate, as was United Stations Radio Networks, which teamed with Shannon for a syndicated program slated to air in November 2014.

On September 22, 2016, Scott Shannon and the United Stations Radio Networks struck a deal to relaunch radio syndication of the True Oldies Channel. A handful of radio affiliates, including WZTI in Milwaukee, Wisconsin were test-subjects for the new cloud based distribution created by Synchronicity before the nationwide reinstatement.

On September 6, 2023, two months after the sale of USRN to Gemini XIII, it was announced that syndication of the channel would shift to Local Radio Networks.

== Evolution ==
At the time of the station's launch (a time when "real oldies" was experiencing a certain degree of revival on the AM dial), the True Oldies Channel featured only music from 1955 to 1969 with less than ten percent from 1970 to 1973 (for example "Tears of a Clown" and "Burning Love"). The format was 60% 1964 to 1969 (the post-British Invasion era) and 40% 1955 to 1963 (the pre-British Invasion rock and roll/doo-wop era). It was the network's original mission to avoid the trends of other oldies outlets and remain committed to the music produced from the beginning of the rock-and-roll era to the disco era (1955 to 1979), purposefully drawing the line of what they would (originally) never air at 1980. By 2005, oldies from the early 1970s were added in moderation, while the pre-1964 material was cut back slightly. In 2006, more late 1970s music was added and the pre-1964 songs were cut down to two or three per hour. In March 2008, the pre-1964 music was cut down to one song per hour during the day and twice an hour on overnights; and the hits from the late-1960s and early- to mid-1970s was played in equal amounts. A few 1980s cuts were also added.

On July 7, 2008, The True Oldies Channel further modified its format, dropping all but a couple pre-1964 titles and added a large amount of music from the 1980s, playing a couple per hour. The format was then more of a Classic Hits format and was oldies in name only. This change was short lived and by the end of July they backed off the 1980s music and by August most 1980s' music was gone. A moderate amount of pre-1964 material was also reinstated.

The network's original ban on 1980s music no longer is enforced; songs such as "Take Me Home Tonight" by Eddie Money from 1986 and "Into the Night" by Benny Mardones (1980) occasionally are played on the network. The network now focuses its branding on variety, admitting they too have followed trends toward newer music, but also making sure to retain some of the older music that most oldies stations have abandoned. The majority of the network's programming remains 1960s music, with 1970s music more prominent than it was in the beginning. 1950s and 1980s music are currently played sporadically, less than once an hour; as of the 2014 online revival, Shannon acknowledges the addition of “a few (songs) tossed in from the 80s.”

== Growth ==
The True Oldies format had experienced significant growth in exposure following cost-cutting measures across Citadel's payroll since the company's acquisition of ABC Radio Networks (and some of its O&O stations) from Disney. Lower performing stations owned by Citadel Broadcasting, such as WYAY (now K-Love owned and operated WAKL) Atlanta, were switched over to True Oldies, sometimes with Imus in the Morning as the morning show. WLS-FM Chicago, however, only ran True Oldies Channel overnights and weekends with a similar local oldies format weekdays.

== See also ==
- Timeless
