= Bless a Brand New Angel =

Studio album by Benny Mardones
- Released: 1998
- Studio: Capitol Studios and Hollywood Sound Recorders (Hollywood, California)
- Length: 38:54
- Label: Crave
- Producer: Joel Diamond; Jim Ervin; Maurice Starr

Benny Mardones chronology
Stand by Your Man (1996)	Bless a Brand New Angel (1998)	A Journey Through Time (2002)

Bless a Brand New Angel is the sixth studio album from American singer Benny Mardones, released by Crave in 1998.

== Background ==
Both Bless a Brand New Angel and its title track (which was released as a single) failed to generate commercial success. As "Bless a Brand New Angel" began generating airplay in the United States, Crave was shut down in July 1998. On June 19, 1998, the Gavin Report listed "Bless a Brand New Angel" under adult contemporary as "chartbound", with the single having generated 46 reports and 671 spins. In 1999, Bless a Brand New Angel was reissued as Angel by Fuel 2000. The title track achieved further airplay, with the Gavin Report reporting 87 spins and placing the song at No. 35 on their Adult Contemporary chart.

== Critical reception ==
Professional ratings
Review scores
Source	Rating
AllMusic	3/5 stars

Tomas Mureika of AllMusic described Bless a Brand New Angel as "standard fare" from Mardones, but praised his vocals as "strong". He added: "While it lacks the punch of his 1980s material, Bless a Brand New Angel contains more soulful rockers in the tradition that Mardones has made solidly his own." In a review of the title track, Larry Flick of Billboard described it as "meticulously designed for AC playlists". He praised Mardones' "raspy voice" which he felt "makes for a nice contrast against the track's oh-so-pretty piano/string arrangement".

== Track listing ==
No.	Title	Writer(s)	Length
1.	"Bless a Brand New Angel"	Judithe Randall, Robin Randall	4:51
2.	"If I Could Have My Way"	Leslie Pearl	5:11
3.	"Touch"	Maurice Starr	4:37
4.	"From Me to You"	Bobby Eli, Lee Phillips	3:46
5.	"You Are My World"	Benny Mardones, Robert Tepper	4:48
6.	"No Words for Love"	Peter Myer	4:13
7.	"Everything That Touches You"	Michael Kamen	3:29
8.	"To Make a Long Story Short"	Van McCoy	4:35
9.	"You're a Part of Me"	Mardones, Jim Ervin, Jack Conrad	5:03
10.	"I Believe in Miracles"	Barry Mason, Les Reed	3:45

== Personnel ==
- Benny Mardones – lead vocals
- Jim Ervin – keyboards, bass, drums, percussion
- Jim Cox – acoustic piano, organ
- Maurice Starr – instruments (3), orchestrations (3), backing vocals (3)
- Charles Fearing – guitars
- Bruce Watson – guitars
- Lance Morrison – bass
- Nick Vincent – drums
- Tommy Oliver – orchestrations
- Ayanna Bereal – backing vocals
- Troy Clark – backing vocals
- Martika Knight – backing vocals

=== Production ===
- Jim Ervin – executive producer, producer (1, 2, 4–10)
- Joel Diamond – producer
- Maurice Starr – producer (3)
- Bryan Davis – engineer, mixing
- Dann Thompson – engineer
- Mike Tritter – engineer
- Brian Gardner – mastering at Bernie Grundman Mastering (Hollywood, California)
- Joel Zimmerman – art direction
