= This Time =

This Time may refer to:

== Film and television ==
- This Time (film), a 2016 film
- This Time with Alan Partridge, a British comedy television series

== Music ==
=== Albums ===
- This Time (Al Jarreau album), or the title song, 1980
- This Time (Beanie Sigel album), or the title song, 2012
- This Time (Chantay Savage album), or the title song, 1999
- This Time (Dwight Yoakam album), or the title song, 1993
- This Time (Los Lobos album), or the title song, 1999
- This Time (Melanie C album), or the title song (see below), 2007
- This Time (Natalia album), or the title song, 2003
- This Time (Robert Cray album), or the title song, 2009
- This Time (Taral Hicks album), or the title song, 1997
- This Time (Thomas Anders album), or the title song, 2004
- This Time (Waylon Jennings album), or the title song (see below), 1974
- This Time – The First Four Years, by Culture Club, 1987
- This Time..., by Anthony Braxton, 1970
- This Time, by Lee Soo Young, 2003
- This Time, by Rock Goddess, 2019
- This Time..., by Stevie B, 2006

=== Songs ===
- "This Time" (Axwell & Ingrosso song), 2015
- "This Time" (Bryan Adams song), 1983
- "This Time" (Dina Carroll song), 1993
- "This Time" (Dragon song), 1976
- "This Time" (Glee song), by Lea Michele from the TV series Glee, 2015
- "This Time" (INXS song), 1985
- "This Time" (Kiara song), 1988
- "This Time" (Melanie C song), 2007
- "This Time" (Melanie Fiona song), 2012
- "This Time" (Monika Linkytė and Vaidas Baumila song), representing Lithuania at Eurovision 2015
- "This Time" (Patricia Conroy song), 1990
- "This Time" (Pia Toscano song), 2011
- "This Time" (Sawyer Brown song), 1994
- "This Time" (Starsailor song), 2006
- "This Time" (Thomas Wayne song), 1958; covered by Troy Shondell, 1961
- "This Time" (Waylon Jennings song), 1974
- "This Time" (William Mangion song), representing Malta at Eurovision 1993
- "This Time"/"I Wish You Well", by Cara Dillon, 2006
- "This Time", by 3 Doors Down from Away from the Sun
- "This Time", by Amanda Perez
- "This Time", by Benny Mardones, written by Benny Mardones and Robert Tepper, from Too Much to Lose
- "This Time", by Benny Mardones, written by Benny Mardones and James K. Ervin, from Let's Hear It for Love
- "This Time", by Carrie Underwood from Play On
- "This Time", by Celine Dion from Taking Chances
- "This Time", by Cherie and Marie Currie from Messin' with the Boys
- "This Time", by Chicago from Chicago XI
- "This Time", a hit single in Ireland by Chris Moore
- "This Time", by DJ Antoine
- "This Time", by Depswa from Two Angels and a Dream
- "This Time", by Dream Street from Dream Street
- "This Time", by the Feeling from Join With Us
- "This Time", by the Gear Daddies from Let's Go Scare Al
- "This Time", by Guano Apes from Bel Air
- "This Time", by Il Volo from Il Volo
- "This Time", by Irving Berlin
- "This Time", by Janet Jackson from Janet
- "This Time", by JDiggz featuring Neverending White Lights
- "This Time", by John Legend from Evolver
- "This Time", by John Mellencamp from Nothin' Matters and What If It Did
- "This Time", by JoJo from The High Road
- "This Time", by Kayzo, 2017
- "This Time", by Klymaxx from One Day
- "This Time", by Kutless from Kutless
- "This Time", by Life of Agony from River Runs Red
- "This Time", by P.O.D. from Testify
- "This Time", by Rae Morris from Unguarded
- "This Time," by Shana
- "This Time", by Shirley Bassey from The Performance
- "This Time", by the Smashing Pumpkins from Machina: The Machines of God
- "This Time", by Suede from Sci-Fi Lullabies
- "This Time", by Tracy Chapman from Crossroads
- "This Time", by Vanessa Carlton from Heroes & Thieves
- "This Time", by the Verve from Urban Hymns
- "This Time", by Wet Wet Wet from The Memphis Sessions
- "This Time", by Wonder Girls, a B-side from the single "So Hot"
- "This Time (We'll Get it Right)", by the England national football team, a 1982 UK hit single by footballers
