= Incitare =

Studio album by Volto!
- Released: July 23, 2013
- Length: 53:36
- Label: Concord Music Group

Incitare is the first album by Los Angeles based band Volto!. It was released on July 23, 2013 through Concord Music.

== History and recording ==
Volto formed in the early 2000s, but had not previously released any material. Incitare was recorded in drummer Carey's home studio, using only live takes.

== Music videos ==
The band's very first and only music video was made for the song "Tocino" from their debut album Incitare. The video was created by artists Tas Limur and Jacob Roanhaus. Drummer Danny Carey makes a cameo in the video as a security guard. The video was released in July, 2013.

== Album artwork ==
For the album art for Incitare, drummer Danny Carey had the idea to use a piece in his collection by the famous underground psychedelic artist Rick Griffin. Originally, this was to be used as cover art for a Steppenwolf record, but for whatever reasons, didn't happen. With the other members equally enthusiastic by the piece, together with art contributions by Tool guitarist Adam Jones, the packaging was complete.

== Reception ==
The album received generally positive reviews, being especially lauded for the technical skills present on the album. Jack Smith in OnStage Magazine wrote, "Though one might expect a high degree of technical aptitude from these players, listening to how crisp and synchronized the players are throughout the long, climactic solos and incredibly complex chord progressions is enough to floor most listeners." Raffaella Berry, writing for prog-sphere.com, wrote that the album "celebrates the joy of playing music at a very high level of proficiency without hitting the listener over the head with one’s chops."

== Track listing ==
1. Grip It (5:50)
2. Gillz (6:37)
3. Whopner (6:13)
4. Drumbeaux (8:36)
5. Quirk (4:09)
6. BHP (6:03)
7. Meltdown (4:57)
8. Tocino (4:25)
9. I'm Calm Now (6:49)

== Personnel ==
- John Ziegler – guitar
- Lance Morrison – bass
- Danny Carey – drums
- Jeff Babko – keyboards
