= Thank God for Girls =

Thank God for Girls may refer to:

- Thank God for Girls (album), by Benny Mardones in 1978
- "Thank God for Girls" (song), by Weezer in 2015
