= Never Run, Never Hide =

Studio album by Benny Mardones
- Released: 1980
- Recorded: 1979–1980
- Studios: Quadradical Studios (Miami, Florida)
- Genre: Pop rock
- Length: 37:01
- Label: Polydor
- Producer: Barry Mraz

Benny Mardones chronology
Thank God for Girls (1978)	Never Run, Never Hide (1980)	Too Much to Lose (1981)

Never Run, Never Hide is the second studio album by pop-rock singer-songwriter Benny Mardones, released in May 1980 by Polydor Records. It included his biggest hit, "Into the Night", which peaked that year at No. 11 in the Billboard Hot 100 chart, and re-charted nine years later, in 1989.

Mardones said that the music was based on reality, stating in an interview that "nothing on my album is made up." The track "American Bandstand", which was written about the music TV show of the same name and the presenter and host Dick Clark, was performed on American Bandstand. "Hold Me Down" was originally recorded and released on Mardones' 1978 debut album Thank God for Girls.

== Critical reception ==
Professional ratings
Review scores
Source	Rating
AllMusic	4/5 stars

On 3 May 1980, Cashbox wrote that the songs on Never Run, Never Hide "are as much dramatic productions as they are straight ahead rock songs", highlighting Mardones's "flair for writing strong melodies and lyrics", along with his "wild boy rock style" that is reminiscent of Meat Loaf. A week later, on May 10, Billboard praised Mardones's voice for doing justice to the album's songs, noting that its "uncompromising basic rock recalls Bob Seger at his best", and describing it as "well thought-out, well-played, and totally credible" commercial rock with no "frills". When mentioning the album's best songs, both reviewers excluded "Into the Night" but included "She's So French".

In July of that year, John Griffin of The Gazette found that Never Run, Never Hide "touches on the cornerstones of the rock foundation", observing that Mardones has a huge and expressive voice in the "Springsteen vein." However, Griffin considered the album's greatest issue to be the production's "mock-heroism" style. At the end of the next month, Jack Lloyd of the Knight Newspaper Service wrote in The Blade that although the record has a limited amount of innovation, the songs are "at least put together with a fresh point of view", remarking that Mardones employs the usual forms of "punchy rockers and mellow ballads." In September, Christine Hogan agreed that album's production was "terrific" as it "achieved wonderful levels of musical texture", concluding that it was "first rate rock and roll."

== Track listing ==
Side one
No.	Title	Writer(s)	Length
1.	"She's So French"	Benny Mardones; D.L. Byron	4:33
2.	"Mighta Been Love"	Mardones; Robert Tepper	4:05
3.	"Into the Night"	Mardones; Tepper	4:30
4.	"Crazy Boy"	Mardones; Byron	4:20

Side two
No.	Title	Writer(s)	Length
1.	"Hold Me Down"	Mardones; Byron; Hayden Wayne	3:13
2.	"American Bandstand"	Mardones; Byron	3:54
3.	"Hey Baby"	Mardones	3:58
4.	"Hometown Girls"	Mardones; Byron	3:13
5.	"Too Young"	Mardones; Tepper	5:15
Total length:			37:01

== Personnel ==
Adapted from the album's liner notes's liner notes.

Musicians

- Benny Mardones – lead vocals, backing vocals
- Robert Tepper – backing vocals
- Ron Bloom, Bobby Massaro – guitars
- Kinny Landrum – keyboards
- Rockin' Leigh Foxx – bass
- Sandy Gennaro – drums

Production

- Barry Mraz – producer, engineer
- David "The Gazelle" Gotlieb, Paul Speck – assistant engineers
- Greg Calbi – mastering (at Sterling Sound)
- Richard Wexler – photography
- Stephanie Zuras (AGI) – design
- Bob Heimall (AGI) – art direction
- Eric Gardner – management

== Charts ==
Chart (1980)	Peak position
U.S. Billboard 200	65

Chart (1989)	Peak position
U.S. Billboard 200	178
