= Hometown Girls (song) =

Single by Benny Mardones

from the album Never Run, Never Hide
- B-side: "Crazy Boy"
- Released: 1980
- Length: 3:13
- Label: Polydor
- Songwriters: Benny Mardones; David Leigh Byron
- Producer: Barry Mraz

Benny Mardones singles chronology
"Into the Night" (1980)	"Hometown Girls" (1980)	"Sheila C." (1981)

"Hometown Girls" is a song by American singer-songwriter Benny Mardones, which was released in 1980 as the second and final single from his second studio album Never Run, Never Hide. The song was written by Mardones and David Leigh Byron, and produced by Barry Mraz. As the follow-up to Mardones' US top 20 hit "Into the Night", "Hometown Girls" failed to enter the Billboard Hot 100 but reached No. 3 on the Bubbling Under the Hot 100 chart.

== Promotion ==
In October 1980, Mardones performed the song, along with "Into the Night", on the Toni Tennille Show.

== Critical reception ==
On its release, Billboard described the song as a "rocker that showcases Mardones' full-bodied vocal". They added that the "guitar, drums and bass give the song its rock base". Cash Box listed the single as one of their "feature picks" during October 1980. They described it as an "electric pop-rocker, with [an] overdrive rhythm and catchy, ultra-melodic hook". They praised Mardones' vocals "that won't give an inch" and the "layered harmonies [that] ring with the guitars", adding: "Songs like this give Top 40 a good name".

In a review of Never Run, Never Hide, Eric Siegel of The Baltimore Sun considered "Hometown Girls" "an up-tempo pop rocker that stands as the album's best effort", with Mardones "every inch an exuberant innocent as he sings [the chorus]". Siegel also felt the song was the best example of Mardones "retain[ing] some of the pop flavorings and ingenuousness" of his 1978 debut album Thank God for Girls.

== Track listing ==
7" single

1. "Hometown Girls" - 3:13
2. "Crazy Boy" - 4:20

7" single (promo)

1. "Hometown Girls" - 3:13
2. "Hometown Girls" - 3:13

== Personnel ==
- Benny Mardones - lead vocals, backing vocals
- Ron Bloom, Bobby Messano - guitars
- Kinny Landrum - keyboards
- Leigh Foxx - bass
- Sandy Gennaro - drums
- Robert Tepper - backing vocals

Production

- Barry Mraz - producer, engineer
- David Gotlieb, Paul Speck - assistant engineers
- Vlado Meller - mastering

== Charts ==
Chart (1980)	Peak position
US Billboard Bubbling Under the Hot 100	3
US Record World Singles 101–150	116
