= Junior Tucker =

- Born: Leslie Tucker; 23 September 1966 (age 59); Trenchtown, Kingston, Jamaica
- Genres: Reggae, dancehall, gospel music
- Occupations: Singer, songwriter, minister
- Years active: 1973–present
- Labels: VP Records, Island Records, Geffen Records, Virgin Records
- Website: Junior Tucker YouTube Channel

Leslie Tucker, known as Junior Tucker (born 23 September 1966 in Trenchtown, Kingston, Jamaica), is a Jamaican reggae singer, who started his career in secular music but who now sings Christian music. His hits included "Happy" and his own composition, "Don't Test".

== Career ==
His first hit was "Happy", released when he was aged seven years old, and was a No. 1 hit single in Jamaica, where he was known as the Jamaican Michael Jackson. He performed the tune at the One Love Peace Concert in 1978. He had further hits with his cover version of "Some Guys Have All The Luck" and, in 1983, recorded the first version of "Mr. Telephone Man", a 1984 Top 20 Billboard hit for New Edition. He then studied audio engineering at the Institute of Audio Research in New York City, and following his study began to write his own songs. "Don't Test", one of his first compositions, became an international hit earning him a recording contract with Virgin in 1989. "Don't Test" peaked at No. 54 in the UK Singles Chart in June 1990. He was released from his Virgin contract in 1991, returning to Jamaica, where he became a dancehall act.

Tucker also had international success (especially in Australia in 1991) with a reggae cover of the 1980 Benny Mardones hit "Into the Night". Junior Tucker's version was called "16 (Into The Night)". In 1993, he recorded a No. 1 hit in "Love of a Lifetime", releasing an album of the same name later that year for VP Records.

After the death of his father and birth of his daughter, Tucker went in search of the meaning of life. After asking God to 'let him sleep', he became a born again Christian, and was baptised. He said that God had led him to move to Florida, where he initially sung at a mostly West Indian church in Broward. He subsequently moved to New Harvest Church in Clewiston, Florida and enrolled on a correspondence course degree in Ministry.

He has recorded several Christian reggae albums including Brand New, Ready for the Rapture, Sold Out – Worship from the Islands plus Victory – Worship from the Islands II.

== Discography ==
=== Albums ===
- It's a Small, Small World (1978), Top Ranking
- Take a Message (1980), Tuff Gong Records
- Jr. Tucker (1983), Geffen Records
- Don't Test (1990), 10 Records (ARIA #150)
- Love of a Lifetime (1993), VP Records
- Secret Lover (1994), VP Records
- Ooh Child (1995), Lagoon
- True Confession (1996), VP Records
- Deep Inside of You (1996), Don't Test Productions
- Brand New (1998), Word and Worship Music
- Ready for the Rapture (2001), Main Street Music
- Sold Out (2005), New Life Music
- Victory (2007), Word and Worship Music
- Man of God (2010), Word and Worship Music
- Jesus Famous (2015), Word and Worship Music
- Journey (2024), Word and Worship Music

=== Singles ===
List of charted singles, with selected chart positions
Title	Year	Peak chart positions		Album
Title	Year	AUS	UK	Album
"Don't Test"	1990	—	54	Don't Test
"16 (Into the Night)"	1990	46	—	Don't Test
"Love Is the Strongest Emotion"	1991	165	—	Don't Test
