= Hometown Girls =

Hometown Girls may refer to:

- Hometown Girls (album), a 1985 album by Denny Laine
- Hometown Girls (song), a 1980 song by Benny Mardones

== See also ==
- Hometown Girl (disambiguation)
