= Stand by Your Man (Benny Mardones album) =

Studio album by Benny Mardones
- Released: 1996
- Length: 48:01
- Label: Curb
- Producer: Michael Lloyd; Shaun LaBelle

Benny Mardones chronology
Benny Mardones (1989)	Stand by Your Man (1996)	Bless a Brand New Angel (1998)

Stand by Your Man is the fifth solo studio album by American singer Benny Mardones, released by Curb in 1996.

== Background ==
Shortly after the album's completion, Mardones worked with producer Shaun LaBelle on the song "Stand By Your Man". Mardones originally intended to give it to a band he was involved in managing, a group of "four kids who I found singing on the street corner". LaBelle encouraged Mardones to record the song himself after hearing his guide vocal. The resulting recording was enthusiastically received by Curb, who believed it had hit potential, and was later released as a promotional single. When it failed to generate sufficient airplay to meet Curb's expectations, the label pulled out of promoting it any further at the end of the third week of release. The decision caused the relationship between Mardones and the label to become strained and he subsequently asked to be released from his contract.

== Critical reception ==
Professional ratings
Review scores
Source	Rating
AllMusic	1/5 stars

Stephen Thomas Erlewine of AllMusic described Stand by Your Man as "a collection to avoid" and commented, "Although Mardones never had anything approaching a gritty sound – he was strictly a soft rock and adult contemporary singer – all of these recordings are too slick and synthesized to make any impact." In a review of the "Stand by Your Man" single, Larry Flick of Billboard described the song as a "cute finger-snapper" and "fine fodder for AC formats". He noted that Mardones "works hard to assert a new sound", with the singer "ton[ing] down his typical vocal vigor in favor of a quiet R&B sound". Flick also noted that Mardones is "surrounded by sweeping harmonies" and believed the "sing-along chorus" would be "likely to trigger comparisons" to the 1992 song "End of the Road" by American R&B group Boyz II Men.

== Track listing ==
No.	Title	Writer(s)	Length
1.	"Stand by Your Man"	Shaun LaBelle, Steve Bensusen, Gerry Stober	5:02
2.	"Baby Tonight"	Benny Mardones, Jack Conrad	5:05
3.	"Dream Baby"	Mardones, Michael Lloyd, Conrad	3:52
4.	"It's All in the Game"	Carl Sigman, Charles Gates Dawes	4:27
5.	"How Could You Love Me"	Mardones, Duane Evans	4:45
6.	"I Feel Your Love Tonight"	Mardones, Lloyd	5:06
7.	"Run to You"	Mardones, Evans	4:10
8.	"Killing Me Slow"	Mardones, Conrad, Lloyd	4:51
9.	"Running Scared"	Joe Melson, Roy Orbison	2:10
10.	"Two Worlds, Two Hearts"	Jan van der Meij	4:23
11.	"Sheila C."	Mardones, Robert Tepper, Evans	4:10

2015 Curb Records reissue
No.	Title	Writer(s)	Length
12.	"Into the Night" ('89 re-recorded)	Mardones, Tepper	4:22

== Personnel ==
- Benny Mardones – lead vocals (1–11), backing vocals (5, 7, 10)
- David Barry – guitar (1)
- Shaun LaBelle – synths, bass, drum programming (1)
- Rob Chiarelli – additional drum programming (1)
- Tim Owens – backing vocals (1)
- Terry Stanton – backing vocals (1)
- Barrington Henderson – backing vocals (1)
- Keith Heffner – additional programming and arrangements (2)
- Charles Fearing – guitar (2, 3, 4, 6, 8, 11)
- Terry Young – backing vocals (2–4, 6, 8–9, 11)
- Maxine Waters – backing vocals (2–4, 8–9, 11)
- Monalisa Young – backing vocals (2–4, 9, 11)
- Julia Waters – backing vocals (2–4, 8)
- Jim Ervin – orchestrations (3, 6, 8–9), programming (3, 6, 8–9), additional arrangements (4, 11), additional programming (5, 11)
- Mary Griffin – lead vocals (4)
- Tom Scott – saxophone (4)
- Jeff Porcaro – drums (5, 7)
- John Pierce – bass (5, 7)
- Duane Evans – keyboards (5, 7), backing vocals (5, 7)
- Michael Lloyd – keyboards (5, 7), backing vocals (5, 7, 8–10)
- Laurence Juber – guitar (5, 7, 9–10)
- Dave Amato – guitar (5, 7), backing vocals (5, 7)
- Debby Lytton Lloyd – backing vocals (5, 7, 9–10)
- Phillip Edwards – backing vocals (6)
- Josef Powell – backing vocals (6)
- Oren Waters – backing vocals (6)
- John Jorgenson – guitar (9)
- Maxie Anderson – backing vocals (9, 11)
- Myron Grombacher – drums (10)
- Dennis Belfield – bass (10)

Production

- Shaun LaBelle – production (1), arrangement (1)
- Dik Shopteau – recording (1)
- Anthony Jeffries – recording (1)
- Rob Chiarelli – mixing (1)
- Steve Hall – mastering (1)
- Michael Lloyd – production (2–11), arrangement (2–11), mixing (2–11), engineering (9)
- Bob Kearney – engineering (2–6, 8–11), mixing (2–11)
- Jim Ervin – engineering (2–9, 11), mixing (2–11)
- Carmine Rubino – engineering (7), mixing (7)
- James Mansfield – mixing assistance (2–11)
- Bryan Davis – mixing assistance (2–11)
- Doug Boehm – mixing assistance (2–11)
- Dave Collins – mastering (2–11), digital editing (2–11)

Other

- Susan Antonishek – photography
