= Stand by Your Man (disambiguation) =

"Stand by Your Man" is a 1968 single by Tammy Wynette.

Stand by Your Man may also refer to:

== Music ==
- Stand by Your Man (Tammy Wynette album), 1969
- Stand by Your Man (Benny Mardones album), 1996
- "Stand by Your Man" (LL Cool J song), 1993
- Stand by Your Man (EP), 1982 EP by Lemmy and Wendy O. Williams
- Stand by Your Man, a 1971 album by Candi Staton

== Other uses ==
- Stand by Your Man (film), a 1981 American made-for-television biographical film
- Stand by Your Man (TV series), 1992 American sitcom
- "Stand by Your Man", a 1990 episode of The Golden Girls season 6
