= Volto =

Volto may refer to:

- Volto (mask), or larva, a type of Venetian mask worn at the Carnival of Venice
- Volto!, an American jazz rock jam band
