= Too Much to Lose =

Studio album by Benny Mardones
- Released: 1981
- Genre: Pop rock
- Length: 43:01
- Label: Polydor
- Producer: "The Wizard" Barry Mraz

Benny Mardones chronology
Never Run, Never Hide (1980)	Too Much to Lose (1981)	Benny Mardones (1989)

Too Much to Lose is the third studio album from American singer Benny Mardones, released in 1981. It was produced by "The Wizard" Barry Mraz. The album was Mardones' last for eight years.

== Background ==
After the success of 1980 album Never Run, Never Hide, and particularly the hit song "Into The Night", Mardones entered the studio to record his third studio album. It was recorded at Right Track Studios and was one of the first records to be recorded there since its move from 21st Street to 48th Street. Although expectations were high for the album, disagreements at Polydor and other factors resulted in the commercial failure of Too Much to Lose when it was released in 1981. Despite this, many fans of Mardones highlight songs such as "Shelia C", "Baby Don't" and "I'm Not Gonna Cry Anymore".

The album's only single was "Sheila C". Much of the material on the album was written by Mardones and Robert Tepper, having previously written "Into The Night" together. The album features a cover of Lulu's "Oh Me Oh My" and Nancy Brooks "I'm Not Gonna Cry Anymore". "Sheila C." would later be re-recorded for Mardones' 2002 album A Journey Through Time.

== Release ==
Too Much to Lose was only released on vinyl in America only. The album remained out-of-print for many years. Later, Warrior Records issued the album on CD for the first time.

== Track listing ==
No.	Title	Writer(s)	Length
1.	"Sheila C."	Benny Mardones, Robert Tepper, Duane Evans	5:26
2.	"This Time"	Mardones, Tepper	6:16
3.	"The Dreamer"	Mardones, Tepper	4:40
4.	"Till He Mentioned Your Name"	Mardones, Tepper	5:12
5.	"Baby Don't"	Mardones, Tepper	4:14
6.	"Treat You Right"	Mardones, Tepper	5:34
7.	"I'm Not Gonna Cry Anymore"	Bobby David	4:20
8.	"Oh Me Oh My"	Jim Doris	7:19

== Critical reception ==
Professional ratings
Review scores
Source	Rating
AllMusic	3/5 stars

Upon its release, Billboard wrote: "Mardones is an emotional kind of guy. His wailing echoes throughout Too Much to Lose, while backing musicians provide solid support. Mardones has a wonderful, versatile voice that is shown off to its best advantage on such cuts as "Sheila C.", "Treat You Right" and "The Dreamer". All the songs on the album are about women, but it's these, with their loving, rather than bitter, sentiments that come across as the most sincere. Best cuts: Those cited, plus "Oh Me Oh My"." Marc D. Allan of The Boston Globe stated: "On his third album, the only noticeable change is nearly all the songs are punched up a little to bring them closer to straight rock 'n' roll. Mardones isn't a macho personality but an honest, straight-from-the-heart rocker who, in his own somewhat awkward way, accurately represents how a large majority of people think and feel."

Bruce Britt of the Detroit Free Press described the album as "endearingly dumb, heavy metal pop". He added: "Mardones displays impressive vocal flexibility, switching from a compassionate falsetto to a chalky growl. "Sheila C.," "This Time" and "Treat You Right" are the highlights, where he sounds like Van Halen performing Sam Cooke." Mike Kuchta of Quad-City Times wrote: "If Mardones learned a little restraint, he might actually make a decent album some day. With his soul-tinged street rock, he aspires to be a Bruce Springsteen but winds up closer to a Meat Loaf."

== Personnel ==
- Benny Mardones – lead vocals, backing vocals
- Duane Evans – keyboards
- Kinny Landrum – Prophet-5, vocoder
- Michael Kamen – Synclavier
- Terry Bacon – guitars
- Lars Hanson – guitars
- Robert Tepper – bass, backing vocals
- Gregg Gerson – drums
- Mark Rivera – saxophones

=== Production ===
- Barry Mraz – producer, engineer

== Charts ==
Chart (1981)	Peak position
Cash Box Top Albums	184
