= Benny Mardones =

American singer and songwriter (1946–2020)

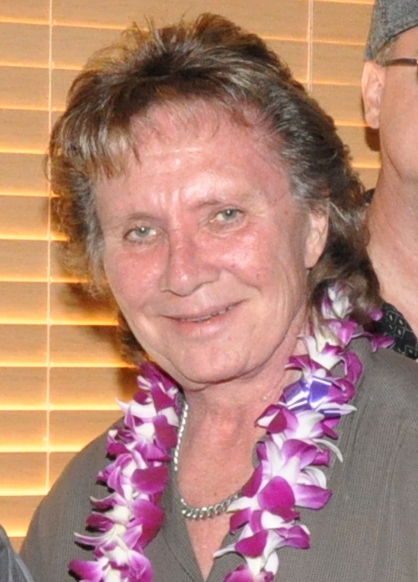
- Mardones in 2010

Background information
- Born: Ruben Armand Mardones; November 9, 1946; Cleveland, Ohio, U.S.
- Died: June 29, 2020 (aged 73) Menifee, California, U.S.
- Genres: Brown-eyed soul; soft rock
- Occupations: Singer; songwriter
- Years active: 1978–2017
- Labels: Polydor; Curb; Warrior

Ruben Armand "Benny" Mardones (November 9, 1946 – June 29, 2020) was an American pop/rock singer and songwriter who was best known for his hit single "Into the Night", which hit the top 20 on the Billboard Hot 100 chart twice, in 1980 (#11) and again in 1989 (#20).

== Early life and career ==
Ruben Armand Mardones was born on November 9, 1946, His father, Ruben Sr., who was originally from Santiago, Chile, left the family when Benny was an infant and returned to Chile. Mardones had a sister, two half-brothers, and two half-sisters who live in Chile.

Mardones grew up in Savage, Maryland, and graduated from Howard High School in Ellicott City, Maryland in 1964. He joined the U.S. Navy after high school and served in the Vietnam War. He was married to Gloria Dianne Whitley. After his discharge, he moved to New York City to pursue his singing and songwriting career, and composed several songs with writing partner Alan Miles.

Mardones began his career as a songwriter, writing songs for people like Brenda Lee and Chubby Checker. He demoed the songs he wrote, and Tommy Mottola suggested that he record his own songs; from that point, he wrote and recorded over 100 songs. Mardones's band was called the Hurricanes.

=== Into the Night ===
Mardones co-wrote the 1980 soft rock hit "Into the Night" with Robert Tepper. The track was featured on his second album Never Run, Never Hide, and peaked at No. 11 on the Billboard Hot 100 and went platinum. Its success catapulted Mardones into the limelight, but he spiraled into substance abuse that resulted in his being dropped by his label Polydor Records. Though he eventually overcame his addiction, Mardones produced no other hits during his career.

In a TV interview on KTLA, Mardones recalled how the song was inspired by a conversation between him and co-author Robert Tepper, after seeing a 16-year-old neighbour take Mardones' dog for a walk. In the real life scene, there was no romantic link.

"Into the Night" charted a second time in 1989 when Phoenix, Arizona radio station KZZP ran a segment titled "Where Are They Now?", and Scott Shannon, then-program director for Pirate Radio in Los Angeles, added "Into the Night" to its playlist. Other stations across the country then followed suit. Curb Records signed Mardones and he re-recorded the song as "Into the Night '89"; it became a hit once more, peaking at No. 20 on the Billboard Hot 100. The track appeared on his self-titled release that year.

== Personal life and death ==
On October 4, 2011, Mardones married his third wife, Jane Braemer, who was originally from Denmark. Together, they resided in Menifee, California. Mardones had a son, Michael (born 1985), from a previous marriage.

Mardones was diagnosed with Parkinson's disease in 2000, but continued to tour and perform until the mid-2010s. In July 2018, he underwent deep brain stimulation to reduce his motor symptoms, but complications from multiple surgeries resulted in coordination issues that led to repeated falls and hip injuries. He died at age 73 from complications of the disease on June 29, 2020.

== Discography ==
=== Studio albums ===
- 1978: Thank God for Girls
- 1980: Never Run, Never Hide
- 1981: Too Much to Lose
- 1985: Unauthorized
- 1986: American Dreams (Benny Mardones & the Hurricanes)
- 1989: Benny Mardones
- 1993: The Lost Tapes
- 1996: Stand by Your Man
- 1998: Bless a Brand New Angel
- 2002: A Journey Through Time
- 2006: Let's Hear It for Love
- 2015: Timeless (Benny Mardones & the Hurricanes)

=== Live albums ===
- 2007: Turning Stone Live 2006
- 2008: Extended Versions (Live)
- 2008: Turning Stone Live 2007
- 2009: Turning Stone Live 2008
- 2010: Turning Stone Live 2009

=== Extended plays ===
- 1980: Live Sides
- 1985: Unauthorized
- 2013: The Lost Tapes

=== Singles ===
Year	Single	Peak chart positions					Album
Year	Single	US	US AC	AUS	CAN	NZ	Album
1970	"Stand and Be Counted" (released as Troy)	—	—	—	—	—	Non-album singles
1970	"Then Go" (released as Troy)	—	—	—	—	—	Non-album singles
1972	"Please Say You Want Me" (released as Troy)	—	—	—	—	—	Non-album singles
1972	"If You Gotta Break Another Heart" (released as Troy)	—	—	—	—	—	Non-album singles
1978	"All for a Reason"	—	—	—	—	—	Thank God for Girls
1980	"Into the Night"	11	—	19	12	29	Never Run, Never Hide
1980	"Hometown Girls"	103	—	—	—	—	Never Run, Never Hide
1981	"Sheila C."	—	—	—	—	—	Too Much to Lose
1989	"Into the Night" (re-recording)	20	20	—	—	—	Benny Mardones
1989	"I Never Really Loved You at All"	—	—	—	—	—	Benny Mardones
1989	"I'll Be Good to You"	—	—	—	—	—	Benny Mardones
1993	"Two Worlds, Two Hearts"	—	—	—	—	—	The Lost Tapes
1995	"Dream Baby"	—	—	—	—	—	Stand by Your Man
1996	"It's All in the Game"	—	—	—	—	—	Stand by Your Man
1996	"Stand by Your Man"	—	—	—	—	—	Stand by Your Man
1999	"From Me to You"	—	—	—	—	—	Bless a Brand New Angel
1999	"Everything That Touches You, Touches Me"	—	—	—	—	—	Bless a Brand New Angel
1999	"Bless a Brand New Angel"	—	—	—	—	—	Bless a Brand New Angel
2002	"I Need a Miracle"	—	30	—	—	—	A Journey Through Time
2003	"I Know You by Heart" (Katrina Carlson with Benny Mardones)	—	25	—	—	—	Untucked (Katrina Carlson album)
2003	"I Want It All"	—	25	—	—	—	A Journey Through Time
2004	"I'm Gonna Make You Love Me" (featuring Tamara Walker)	—	—	—	—	—	A Journey Through Time
2006	"Into the Night/Da Heat of the Night" (Conrad Hilton featuring Benny Mardones)	—	—	—	—	—	Non-album singles
2006	"I Believe in Miracles"	—	—	—	—	—	Non-album singles
2006	"United We Stand" (featuring Teresa James)	—	—	—	—	—	Non-album singles
2006	"Please Say You Want Me"	—	—	—	—	—	Non-album singles
2006	"The Train Don't Stop Here Anymore"	—	—	—	—	—	Let's Hear It for Love
2011	"Forever Hypnotized"	—	—	—	—	—	Let's Hear It for Love
	"Please Say You Want Me"	—	—	—	—	—	Non-album singles
	"And Tomorrow Means Another Day That We're Apart"	—	—	—	—	—	Non-album singles
	"Into the Night/Da Heat of the Night" (featuring Conrad Hilton)	—	—	—	—	—	Non-album singles
2012	"I've Got You"	—	—	—	—	—	Non-album singles
2012	"Into the Night (2012)"	—	—	—	—	—	Non-album singles
2015	"Where Angels Fly"	—	—	—	—	—	Non-album singles
2016	"Christmastime in Syracuse"	—	—	—	—	—	Non-album singles
2017	"No Words for Love"	—	—	—	—	—	Bless a Brand New Angel

== See also ==
- 1980s One-hit wonders in the United States
