= Let's Hear It for Love =

Studio album by Benny Mardones
- Released: April 11, 2006
- Genre: Pop rock
- Length: 57:22
- Label: Warrior Records
- Producer: Jim Ervin

Benny Mardones chronology
A Journey Through Time (2002)	Let's Hear It for Love (2006)	Extended Versions (2008)

Let's Hear It for Love is the eighth studio album from American singer Benny Mardones. It was released in 2006 by Warrior Records and produced by Jim Ervin.

== Background ==
Let's Hear It for Love was Mardones' first album for Warrior Records and his first since 2002's A Journey Through Time. The album was dedicated to long-time road manager and friend, Tommy Piraino, who died around the time from leukemia. The track "Just for You My Friend" was written as a tribute to Piraino.

The title track, "Let's Hear It For Love", is a duet with Eddie Money, who also co-wrote the track. "When the Lights Go Out" is a duet with Robbyn Kirmsse, while the duet "This Time" features Katrina Carlson.

== Release ==
The album was released on CD and as a digital download by Warrior Records. The CD was re-issued in 2007 by Warrior Records and again that year by Warrior Records and Bungalo. A single, "The Train Don't Stop Here Anymore", was released from the album.

== Critical reception ==
Professional ratings
Review scores
Source	Rating
AllMusic	3/5 stars

AllMusic stated: "Apart from some of the production and some wear on his voice, Let's Hear It for Love could easily be mistaken for an album Benny Mardones released in 1986 instead of one from 2006. This record is heavy on love songs, meaning that there are a lot of slow-crawling sentimental tunes that are nevertheless driven by big, cavernous drums straight out of the mid-'80s - and it also sounds like a throwback to '80s album rock. This is enjoyable stuff for anybody who has a taste for either Mardones or the softer mainstream pop of the '80s. But the singer just as often gets bogged down in treacly, turgid emoting that will please his devoted fans but will turn away those casual fans who only know (and only love) "Into the Night"."

== Track listing ==
No.	Title	Writer(s)	Length
1.	"Forever Hypnotized"	Benny Mardones, James K. Ervin	4:16
2.	"The Train Don't Stop Here Anymore"	Mardones, Ervin	5:46
3.	"Innocent Girl"	Mardones, Ervin	4:45
4.	"How Could I Love You More"	Mardones, Ervin	3:52
5.	"Could We Fall in Love Again"	Mardones, Ervin	4:43
6.	"Like a Hero in the Night"	Mardones, Ervin	4:29
7.	"Let's Hear It for Love"	Eddie Money, Mardones, Ervin	4:11
8.	"When the Lights Go Out"	Mardones, Ervin	4:42
9.	"I Might Be a Bird"	Mardones, Ervin	6:05
10.	"This Time"	Mardones, Ervin	4:28
11.	"Just for You My Friend"	Mardones, Ervin	3:53
12.	"Bye Bye Baby, Goobye"	Jack Scott, Mardones, Ervin	6:12

== Personnel ==
- Benny Mardones – vocals
- Bruce Watson – guitars
- Lance Morrison – bass
- Nick Vincent – drums
- Rande Volpert – shaker, tambourine
- Eddie Money – saxophone (7), vocals (7)
- Robbyn Kirmssé – backing vocals, vocals (8)
- Katrina Carlson – vocals (10)

=== Production ===
- Jim Ervin – producer
- Bryan Davis – bass engineer, drum engineer
- Danny Sternbaum – assistant engineer
- Brian Newman – mastering
- Rebecca Roe – art conception, layout design
- Jon "JD" Dickson – photography
