= No Easy Way Out (album) =

Studio album by Robert Tepper
- Released: 1986
- Genre: Rock
- Length: 38:20
- Label: Scotti Brothers Records
- Producer: Joe Chiccarelli

Robert Tepper chronology
No Easy Way Out (1986)	Modern Madness (1988)

No Easy Way Out is the debut studio album from American singer-songwriter Robert Tepper, released by Scotti Brothers Records in 1986. It reached No. 144 on the US Billboard 200 chart.

Four singles were released from the album: "No Easy Way Out", "Don't Walk Away", "Angel of the City" and "If That's What You Call Lovin'". "No Easy Way Out" reached No. 22 on the Billboard Hot 100. "Don't Walk Away" reached No. 85 on the same chart.

Having signed with Scotti Brothers Records in 1985, Tepper's debut album was preceded by the title track, which Sylvester Stallone had heard and chose to feature on the soundtrack of his film Rocky IV. "Angel of the City" was also featured on the soundtrack of Stallone's 1986 film Cobra.

In a 1997 interview with Stefan Edström for aor.nu, Tepper said of the album: "As a piece of work it really was part of the times, and the style was kind of progressive, people really hooked into it. As a work for eighties rock 'n' roll it was really strong, there was a lot of great songs on it."

== Critical reception ==
Professional ratings
Review scores
Source	Rating
Billboard	favorable

Upon release, Billboard wrote: "Title track and first single have been an auspicious debut for Tepper. Album holds the promise of several more singles, most notably "Don't Walk Away" and "Restless World," with similarly punchy production and powerhouse vocals. Has to be considered a serious contender."

== Track listing ==
All tracks written by Robert Tepper, except "Restless World," written by Tepper and Guy Marshall.

No.	Title	Length
1.	"No Easy Way Out"	4:20
2.	"Angel of the City"	4:30
3.	"Don't Walk Away"	4:21
4.	"Your Love Hurts"	4:46
5.	"Restless World"	4:18
6.	"Hopeless Romantic"	3:44
7.	"Soul Survivor"	4:10
8.	"If That's What You Call Lovin'"	4:10
9.	"Domination"	3:52

== Personnel ==
- Robert Tepper – lead vocals (1–9) and backing vocals (1, 7)
- Guy Marshall – guitar (1–2, 7, 9), guitar solo (1), acoustic guitar (6)
- Dann Huff – guitar (2–9), guitar solo (2, 6–7)
- Eric Williams – acoustic guitar (7), guitar (9), guitar solo (9)
- Tim Landers – bass (1–3, 6–9), fretless bass (4)
- Alan Pasqua – keyboards (1–4, 8–9)
- Kim Bullard – keyboards (2, 4), synthesizers (5)
- Scott Wilks – sound effects (3), synthesizers (5), arrangement (5)
- Richard Gibbs – keyboards (9)
- Phil Kenzie – saxophone solo (3)
- Myron Grombacher – drums (1–4, 6–7, 9), Linn drum programming (2), Roland drum programming (4)
- Carlos Vega – drums (8)
- Steve Reid – tambourine (6), percussion (7)
- Tom Kelly – backing vocals (1)
- Tommy Funderburk – backing vocals (1, 3–4, 6–7)
- Karla DeVito – backing vocals (2)
- Beth Andersen – backing vocals (2)
- Andrea Robinson – backing vocals (3)
- Laura Creamer – backing vocals (3)
- Michelle Mancini – backing vocals (3)
- Steve Lively – backing vocals (3–4, 6)
- Táta Vega – solo vocal (4), backing vocals (4)
- Andraé Crouch – chorus vocals (4), backing vocal arrangement (4)
- E.T. – backing vocals (4)
- Van Stephenson – backing vocals (6)
- Dave Rickets – backing vocals (6)
- Dave Baerwald – backing vocals (6)
- Mauricia Terry – backing vocals (6)

Production

- Joe Chiccarelli – production
- Csaba Petocz – mixing (8)
- Marc DeSisto – assistant engineering
- Bill Thomas – assistant engineering, backing vocals recording (6)
- Steve Hug – assistant engineering
- Steve Himelfarb – assistant engineering
- Jeff Demoorse – assistant engineering
- Gary Hollis – assistant engineering
- Jeff Stebbins – assistant engineering

Other

- Lane/Donald – art direction
- Bradford Branson – photography

== Charts ==
Chart (1986)	Peak position
US Billboard 200 Chart	144
