= Modern Madness =

Studio album by Robert Tepper
- Released: 1988
- Length: 44:58
- Label: Scotti Bros. Records
- Producer: Joe Chiccarelli

Robert Tepper chronology
No Easy Way Out (1986)	Modern Madness (1988)	No Rest for the Wounded Heart (1996)

Modern Madness is the second studio album from American singer and songwriter Robert Tepper.

== Background ==
After signing with Scotti Brothers and moving to Los Angeles in 1985, Tepper found himself in the public eye after actor/director Sylvester Stallone used Tepper's song "No Easy Way Out" in the movie Rocky IV. The track climbed to No. 22 on Billboard's Hot 100 in 1986, and Tepper's debut album of the same name peaked at No. 144. However, the 1988 follow-up album Modern Madness was a commercial failure. Both No Easy Way Out and Modern Madness received little promotion from the label Scotti Bros. Records. As a result, Tepper separated from the label in protracted legal proceedings and was unable to record any new material although he would continue to write. A third album No Rest for the Wounded Heart would follow eight years later in 1996.

The album was recorded at One on One Studios. It was entirely produced by Joe Chiccarelli and featured 10 original tracks. All songs were written by Tepper, except for "Don't Get Me Started" and "Daylight" which were both written by Tepper and Phil Galdston, whilst "Love Turned to Crime" was written by Tepper and Myron Grombacher (who provided drums and percussion on the album). The song "Fighting for You" is a duet, featuring guest vocals from Carroll Sue Hill. American pianist and singer-songwriter Tori Amos provided backing vocals on the album. After the disbanding of Amos' group Y Kant Tori Read, Amos decided to work with various artists as a backup vocalist while she decided her next career move.

Two singles were lifted from the album. "The Unforgiven" was released as a 12" promo in America only, with a sticker label stating "Be one of "The Unforgiven". Both sides of the vinyl were the same track. A promotional music video was created for "The Unforgiven". "When You Dream of Love" was also issued in America on 7" vinyl as a promotional release only, featuring the same track on both sides of the vinyl.

In a March 1997 interview with Tepper by Stefan Edström for aor.nu, Tepper was responded to Edström's criticism of Modern Madness:

"I've got to tell you... I agree with you. It was not a great time of my life, I was a little bit nutty at the time, and you can hear it, it sounds like I'm screaming instead of singing. It was just a rough time of life right then, and I don't think I was in a very good frame of mind to make a record. You kind of hear it on that record, the songs aren't as good, the performances aren't as good. It was kind of experimental too, we were trying to do something else and it didn't really work. And I had a lot of resistance on that record right from the beginning from my record company, they gave me a very hard time, so I think there was a lot of frustration on there."

== Release ==
The album was released via Scotti Bros. Records in America, Canada, Japan and certain places in Europe including Germany and Italy. It was issued on vinyl and cassette, whilst CD versions were also released in America, Germany and Japan. The album was manufactured and distributed by CBS Records Inc. Since its release, the album soon became out-of-print and remained that way for many years. In 2009, Sony/BMG re-released his first two albums digitally, and Modern Madness was made available as a MP3 download on places such as iTunes and Amazon.

== Track listing ==
No.	Title	Writer(s)	Length
1.	"The Unforgiven"	Robert Tepper	4:28
2.	"Don't Get Me Started"	Tepper, Phil Galdston	5:00
3.	"Fighting for You"	Tepper	4:10
4.	"Working Understanding"	Tepper	4:32
5.	"Down in the Belly of Life"	Tepper	3:55
6.	"Modern Madness"	Tepper	4:23
7.	"When You Dream of Love"	Tepper	4:48
8.	"Love Turned to Crime"	Tepper, Myron Grombacher	4:41
9.	"Sing for Me"	Tepper	3:59
10.	"Daylight"	Tepper, Galdston	4:59

== Personnel ==
- Robert Tepper - vocals, keyboards (tracks 5 and 8)
- Dann Huff, Gary Myrick, Gene Black - guitar
- Fernando Saunders - bass (tracks 1 to 8, 10)
- Leon Johnson - bass (track 9)
- Kevin Savigar - keyboards
- Myron Grombacher - drums, percussion
- Tori Amos - backing vocals
- Carroll Sue Hill - vocals (track 3)
- Dann Huff - arrangement (track 3)
- Joe Chiccarelli - producer
- Bernard Frings, Toby Wright - assistant engineer
- Paul Lani - recording
- Randee St. Nicholas - photography
- Tony Lane, Nancy Donald - art direction
