= Hometown Girl =

Hometown Girl may refer to:

- Hometown Girl (album), a 1987 album by Mary Chapin Carpenter
- Hometown Girl (song), a 2016 song by Josh Turner

== See also ==
- Hometown Girls (disambiguation)
