= John Ziegler (guitarist) =

John Ziegler aka "JohnZguitar" is an American guitarist based in Los Angeles, California who plays in the groups VOLTO!, Bubbatron, Pigmy Love Circus, and is host of the long-running "Monday Night Jamz" residency at The Baked Potato night club in Studio City, Los Angeles.

== Early years ==
He was born and raised in the Philadelphia, Pennsylvania area and then moved to Houston, Texas at age 17. He then started playing guitar during college and performed for 10+ years at venues all over Texas and the surrounding areas.

== Career ==
In 1996, John moved to Los Angeles to further his musical journey and eventually became close friends with drummer Danny Carey. This led to joining Pigmy Love Circus in 2002, and forming VOLTO! in 2003.

He is also a private guitar & bass instructor with 25+ years experience. John is involved with the studio side of things too, performing an eclectic array of session work, recording, producing, and mixing a wide range of musical genres, with an open, artistic vision and mindset looking forward to future projects with his groups and always available for other artists. He suffered a near fatal stroke on July 16, 2017, after which a GoFundMe was set up by his bandmate Jamie Kime to pay for his medical costs.
