= Katrina Carlson =

American singer-songwriter

- Born: Paradise Valley, Arizona, U.S.
- Occupation: Singer-songwriter
- Instruments: Piano; guitar
- Years active: 1999–present
- Label: Kataphonic
- Website: katrinacarlson.com

Katrina Carlson is an American singer-songwriter. She currently resides in Santa Monica, California with her husband, Kenneth A. Carlson, and her three children, Mackenzie, Alexander and Ruby Rose.

== Early life ==
Carlson was born and grew up in Paradise Valley, Arizona, the youngest of 11 children. By the age of 12, she was playing both piano and guitar, and composing songs. Carlson attended college at Brown University, where she earned a Bachelor of Arts degree with Honors in International Relations, Foreign Policy and Diplomacy with a focus in Nuclear Arms Control. After graduating from college, Carlson moved to New York City and was admitted to the Manhattan School of Music and Brooklyn College’s opera program.

== Career ==
=== Early years ===
During her time in New York, she appeared in an Off-Broadway Cole Porter review, You Never Know. She also lived in Washington, D.C. where she performed in many plays and musicals at various theaters.

In 1993, Carlson moved to Santa Monica, California, where she continued to perform in local and regional theater. Carlson also garnered appearances in films and television shows including: In the Line of Fire, Star Trek: Deep Space Nine as a Bajoran Officer and Special Delivery. Carlson placed two of her songs, "I Never Believed" and "Bring it On" in Special Delivery's soundtrack.

=== Apples For Eve ===
In 1999, Carlson started her own record label, Kataphonic Records. Carlson released her debut record, Apples For Eve, in September 2001. The album was produced by Emmy Award-winning producer Ron Cohen. Three songs from Apples for Eve, "I Know You By Heart", "Friday Night" and "Winning’s Everything", were featured in the documentary feature film Go Tigers!. "Winning’s Everything" was used on NBC's Lost and the title track "Apples For Eve" was featured on the daytime drama Passions. Carlson's song "Friday Night" aired as the theme song for ABC's TGIF Friday Night line up in the fall/winter of 2003–2004.

Carlson was a finalist in the Rolling Stone/Jim Beam emerging Artist series in 2002, finishing second.

=== Untucked ===
Carlson's second album, Untucked, was released in May 2003. David Darling, best known as a member of the Boxing Gandhis and for his work with Meredith Brooks and Brian Setzer, produced the album. Special guests on the disc included Goo Goo Doll drummer Mike Malinin, Oingo Boingo bassist John Avila, hit singer-songwriter Benny Mardones and drummer Josh Freese (Nine Inch Nails, A Perfect Circle, Guns N' Roses).

Four singles from the Untucked CD spent a combined 18 months in the Top 30 of the Billboard and R&R Adult Contemporary charts: "Suddenly Beautiful", "Drive", "Count On Me", and "I Know You By Heart". Carlson’s success on the Billboard charts with these singles put Kataphonic Records in the Top #20 in Billboard's 2005 Adult Pop Power Players special issue (July 23, 2005) with Gregg Bell at the helm as general manager of the label. Other record labels on the Adult Pop Power Players list included Columbia, Epic, Universal, Island Def Jam, Warner Bros, Atlantic, Capitol, Interscope, and Lava.

The first single from Untucked was the pop ballad "I Know You By Heart", which featured Benny Mardones, best known for his 1980's hit single "Into The Night". Later in 2006, Carlson would perform the duet "This Time" with Mardones for his 2006 album Let's Hear It for Love. Nationally syndicated radio host Delilah was a big fan of the track and played it on her show, and Carlson also appeared on the Delilah show on several occasions. "Drive", a cover of the Cars' 1984 hit, was a bonus track on the Untucked CD and was recorded immediately following the album sessions. A mash up of Carlson's "Drive" and the original "Drive", featuring the Cars' Benjamin Orr, spent 3 weeks at No. 1 on Los Angeles radio station KBIG FM and also hit the Top 5 at sister station KOST FM. In their review of the "Suddenly Beautiful" single, Billboard magazine declared the song "beautiful, indeed".

Carlson had numerous songs from the Untucked album included on television shows. Dawson's Creek featured "I Know You By Heart" and "Blue Steak Cadillac", and "Dive" appeared on the Bravo reality show Blowout 3. In 2008, "Go-To Girl" and "Getaway Car" were also featured on the teen drama South Of Nowhere.

Carlson won two awards at the 2003 Los Angeles Music Awards. Untucked was selected as "Best Independent Pop Album", and "Dive" was selected as "Indie Single of the Year".

In 2005, "Suddenly Beautiful" was featured on the Music Is Hope compilation. The record was issued on Robby Takac's (Goo Goo Dolls) Good Charamel records and also included tracks by Goo Goo Dolls and Ani DiFranco.

Also in 2005, Carlson released the original song "You Are Christmas", produced by Tal Herzberg. Musicians on the track include Tim Pierce and John Beasley. In December 2005, the television show Extra! aired the song as well as an interview with Carlson.

In 2008, the track "Mother" was included on Stork Tunes: Songs for a Happy Birth Day, a compilation released by the March of Dimes foundation. Billy Joel, Kenny Loggins, Norah Jones, The Dixie Chicks and Celine Dion also appeared on the disc.

=== Here and Now ===
Here and Now, was released August 2007. Ron Aniello produced the record and played guitar, bass and keyboards. Matt Chamberlain played drums on the record.

Here and Now's first single was an updated take on the Howard Jones classic "No One Is to Blame", with a guest appearance by Jones himself on vocals and piano. The single reached No. 20 on the Billboard chart and hit No. 1 on the ACQB chart, making it Carlson's first No. 1 song. Billboard Magazine's review of the track described the song as "utterly charming".

Carlson's audience grew significantly in 2008 when "Feel For Me" was featured in two episodes of the N Network's 3rd season of the teen drama South of Nowhere. "Feel For Me" was eventually released as the third single from Here and Now.

Here and Now's lead-off track, "Be The One", won first place in the Pop category at Indie International Songwriting Contest and "Be The One" music video won first place at the Indie Gathering. In September 2007, Extra! premiered the "Be The One" video on their show.

In 2008, Carlson played a show at the Briar Rose Winery in Temecula with special guest host Kate Linder of the daytime drama The Young and the Restless. Her performance inspired Briar Rose winery to name their 2007 Estate Zinfandel "Katrina".

Also in 2008, Carlson was selected to attend hit country songwriter Jeffrey Steele's Songwriting Bootcamp. Hundreds of people applied from the US and beyond, and only twelve people were selected. The bootcamp is a three-day, three night songwriting event where songwriters get one-on-one coaching and critiquing from Jeffrey Steele.

In her career, Carlson has performed with Lindsey Buckingham, Howard Jones, Chicago, Kenny Loggins, Rick Springfield, Eddie Money, Julie Roberts, Joan Jett, Tal Bachman, Richard Marx, and Kimberly Locke amongst others.

Katrina Carlson is endorsed by Fender Guitars, Taylor Guitars, Martin Guitars and Dean Markley Strings.

== Discography ==
Albums

- Apples for Eve (2001)
- Untucked (2003)
- Drive (2003)
- You Are Christmas (2005)
- Here and Now (2007)
- Rock Your Beautiful (2009)

Compilation Appearances

- 4th Annual NSAI Song Contest (2004) – New Shoes
- Women at Work (2005) – Underground
- Music Is Hope (2005) – Suddenly Beautiful
- Stork Tunes (2008) – Mother
- Los Angeles Women in Music – Best of the Best Soiree (2007–2008) – Here and Now
- Stomp Out Cancer (2008) – Count On Me

== Awards ==
- 2002 Finalist in the Rolling Stone/Jim Beam emerging Artist series
- 2003 Untucked won "Best Independent Pop Album" at the Los Angeles Music Awards
- 2003 "Dive" won "Indie Single of the Year" at the Los Angeles Music Awards
- 2004 "New Shoes" was a Runner-up in the 4th Annual CMT song Contest
- 2006 Finalist in the Billboard Songwriting Contest
- 2007 Finalist in the Billboard Songwriting Contest
- 2008 Finalist in the Billboard Songwriting Contest
- 2008 "Be The One" music video won 1st place in The Indie Gathering contest
- 2008 "Be The One" won 1st place in the Pop Category at the Indie International Songwriting Contest

== Radio charts ==
Billboard/R&R AC (Nielsen BDS-based)

Song title	Year	Peak
I Know You By Heart (with Benny Mardones)	2003	25
Count On Me	2004	26
Drive	2005	18
Suddenly Beautiful	2005	30
You Are Christmas	2006	14
No One Is To Blame	2007	20
