= Pigmy Love Circus =

American rock band

- Origin: Los Angeles, United States
- Genres: Hard rock; heavy metal; punk rock
- Years active: 1986–present
- Labels: Hellhound; Triple X; Sympathy for the Record Industry; T.O.N.
- Members: Danny Carey; Peter Fletcher; Michael Savage; Shepherd Stevenson; John Ziegler
- Past members: Rand "Pig" Walters; Anthony Martinez; Nat Winger; Jeff Chambers

Pigmy Love Circus is a Los Angeles rock band that has existed since the mid-1980s era of the Hollywood underground rock scene.

Pigmy Love Circus originally consisted of Shepherd Stevenson on bass, Mike Savage on vocals, Anthony Martinez (of Black Flag) on drums, with Rand "Pig" Walters and Peter Fletcher on guitars. Danny Carey, who already played in a number of other bands such as Green Jellÿ and Tool, played with them briefly in 1992, but left to focus on Tool.

By 1995, Pigmy Love Circus disbanded. What was left of the band went their separate ways. Savage went on to form 57 Crown and Big Ugly, both being formidable bands in Hollywood. Stevenson now acts and composes music for film. Fletcher moved to Denver, Colorado. Rand "Pig" Walters moved to South Carolina.

In 1999, Fletcher returned to Los Angeles and the flame was rekindled when Carey demanded a reunion.

The band toured several times in the U.S. in 2002–2004 both alone and also opening for A Perfect Circle in the U.S. and Canada.

In 2012, Pigmy Love Circus played a Dog Patch Wino Reunion show at the Dragonfly in Los Angeles. As of May 2020 this was their final appearance.

In 2014, Rand "Pig" Walters reappeared and released a solo record which is only currently available on his rawpork2014.com website. It was recorded in Nashville and San Francisco, engineered, mixed and mastered by Mark Fuller.

On April 19, 2024 Rand "Pig" Walters died due to complications from pneumonia.

Known for confrontational concerts the band's primal energy encourages fans to jump on stage and sing along on songs such as "Dagwood Killed Blondie" and "Mad House Clown".

== Band members ==
=== Current members ===
- Danny Carey (drums)
- Peter Fletcher (guitar)
- Michael Savage (vocals)
- Shepherd Stevenson (bass)
- John Ziegler (guitar)

=== Past members ===
- Rand "Pig" Walters (guitar)
- Anthony Martinez (drums)
- Jeff Chambers (guitar)

== Discography ==
=== EPs and singles ===
- 1989: I'm The King of L.A. ...I Killed Axl Rose Today
- 1990: Beat on the Brat
- 1992: Drink Free Forever
- 1995: Drug Run to Fontana

=== Albums ===
- 1990: Live (live album)
- 1991: Drink Free Forever
- 1992: When Clowns Become Kings
- 2004: The Power of Beef
