= Into the Night (Benny Mardones song) =

1980 single by Benny Mardones

Single by Benny Mardones

from the album Never Run, Never Hide
- B-side: "She's So French"
- Released: June 1980
- Genre: Soft rock
- Length: 4:30 (album version); 3:43 (radio edit)
- Label: Polydor
- Songwriters: Benny Mardones, Robert Tepper
- Producer: Barry Mraz

Benny Mardones singles chronology
"All for a Reason" (1978)	"Into the Night" (1980)	"Hometown Girls" (1980)

Audio
- "Into the Night" on YouTube

"Into the Night" is a song by American pop rock singer Benny Mardones from his album Never Run, Never Hide (1980). Inspired by an impoverished family Mardones met during the writing of the album, the lead single became a two-time top 20 hit and a signature tune in Mardones' catalogue.

== Overview ==
In an interview with YouTuber Professor of Rock before his death, Mardones recounted the song's origins as dating back to the writing process for the Never Run, Never Hide album. He and songwriter Robert Tepper went to Miami and lived in an apartment while working on songs.

Mardones' neighbors included a family of five: a mother, a father who worked in set design, and three teenagers (two girls and a boy). One day, the father walked out, leaving the family destitute. Mardones, wanting to help in any way he could, started paying the teens for odd jobs such as walking his dog or picking up groceries. The dog-walker was 16-year-old Heidi. One morning, after Mardones had spent most of the night working on the main riff from "Into the Night," Heidi, dressed for school in a rather mature fashion, came up to walk the dog. According to Mardones, when Tepper made a stray remark after she left, Mardones shut him down, saying "Pal, she's just 16 years old, leave her alone."

Mardones tells of taking that line and running with it, slowly spinning the tale of this family across lyrics such as "It's like having a dream / Where nobody has a heart" highlighting the struggles of the father in set design, and the main chorus being about bringing the family out of poverty. Mardones went on to cite the song's success and subsequent radio interviews done with Heidi to clear up the controversy as what helped lift the family out of their poverty. Through the exposure, Heidi would meet and ultimately marry the son of a Puerto Rico-based real estate mogul. Heidi's husband brought the family to Puerto Rico to live with the couple, and gave the brother a job in his company.

In the Professor of Rock interview, Mardones also sheds light on his powerful vocal performance. The singer cut the lead vocal in three takes, impressing album producer and longtime Styx engineer Barry Mraz. The notorious howling instrumental bridge was originally a guide vocal for a saxophonist, but upon completion, Mraz told the singer "We won't be using a saxophone on this record."

The song is unusual for being one of only ten recordings to ever ascend to the top 20 of the Billboard Hot 100 chart twice, in 1980 and 1989. Chubby Checker was first to do so with his cover of "The Twist", a single that went to No. 1 in September 1960 and again in January 1962.

== Commercial success ==
Mardones originally released "Into the Night" in June 1980. The song peaked at No. 11 on the Hot 100 for two weeks that September, logging 20 weeks on the chart before falling off in late October. Mardones was unable to duplicate "Into the Night"'s success and is considered a one-hit wonder.

In 1989, a "Where Are They Now?" Arizona radio segment spurred L.A. DJ Scott Shannon to add the song to his playlist, ultimately returning the song onto the national charts, on May 6. This time, it peaked at No. 20 the first week in July, adding 17 weeks to its previous run of 20, for a total of 37 (nonconsecutive) weeks. "Into the Night" was a hit on Adult Contemporary radio this time as well, where it spent 19 weeks and also peaked at No. 20 on the chart.

The original recording was in C minor. Shortly before his 2017 retirement, Mardones performed it in B minor to accommodate his aging voice.

== Music video ==
Mardones made a music video for the song, but, as it predated MTV by a year, it was not widely broadcast. It opens with Mardones walking down a street and approaching a house. The song plays over the video, and the lyrics serve as Mardones's monologue. He is met at the door by a bearded man who sings the opening line: "She's just 16 years old / Leave her alone." Mardones walks to the back of the house, peering through a window at a young girl sitting sullenly in her room. The video then cuts to Mardones at a pay phone, speaking to the girl on the other end of the line and professing his love. The video cuts again to Mardones returning to the girl's house, carrying a rolled-up carpet. He crawls through her bedroom window and unrolls the magic carpet. As Mardones takes the girl's hand, they take flight into the night sky. The video closes with Mardones serenading the girl as they embrace; the scene fades to black as they kiss.

For many years the video was difficult to find in its entirety, although clips were featured in infomercials for Time-Life Soft Rock compilations. On July 2, 2016, a full version of the video was uploaded to YouTube.

== Other recordings by Mardones ==
The original and best-known version of "Into the Night" is from his 1980 album Never Run, Never Hide with a duration of 4:32. The song was later re-recorded multiple times by Mardones:

- The 1989 version, released on his self-titled album from Curb Records to capitalize on the original's renewed success. (duration: 4:22)
- The 2002 version, from A Journey Through Time. (duration: 4:26)
- The 2002 acoustic version, also on A Journey Through Time. (duration: 4:08)
- The 2019 version, retitled "Into the Night V3", produced by Joel Diamond. (duration: 3:46)
- A new music video can be found on Diamond's YouTube channel.
- "Into the Night V3" was remixed twice, by Dirty Werk and by Eric Kupper. These versions are more influenced by dance than Mardones's trademark soft rock.

== Controversy ==
The controversial opening lyric has led the song to be cited as one of many problematic songs adult men have written and performed about wanting to have sex with teenage girls. Along with songs such as blues standard "Good Morning, Little School Girl", "Christine Sixteen" by Kiss, "Seventeen" by Winger and "Jailbait" by Ted Nugent, "Into the Night" has been interpreted as a song dealing in the sexualization of teenage girls by adult men. In these songs, where "young girls are deemed appropriate sex objects", men describe fantasies of statutory rape. The lyrical controversy dates back to the song's release, in which radio stations were originally hesitant to play the song due to the opening line. It was not until Mardones' label Polydor sent out a letter detailing his account of the song's origins that stations began playing the song.

== Chart performance ==
=== Weekly charts ===
Chart (1980)	Peak position
Canada Top Singles (RPM)	12
New Zealand Singles Chart	29
U.S. Billboard Hot 100	11
Chart (1981)	Peak position
Australian Singles Chart	19
Chart (1989)	Peak position
U.S. Billboard Hot 100	20
U.S. Billboard Adult Contemporary	20
U.S. Billboard Album Rock Tracks	23

=== Year-end charts ===
Chart (1980)	Position
Canada Top Singles (RPM)	85
US Top Pop Singles (Billboard)	69

== Personnel ==
1980 Polydor recording

- Benny Mardones – lead vocals, background vocals
- Bobby Messano, Ron Bloom – guitar
- Kinny Landrum – keyboards
- Leigh Foxx – bass
- Sandy Gennaro – drums
- Robert Tepper – background vocals
- Barry Mraz – producer, engineer
- David Gottlieb, Paul Speck – assistant engineers
- Recorded at Quadradial Cinema Recording Studios, North Miami, FL

1989 Curb recording

- Michael Lloyd – producer, engineer
- Benny Mardones – vocals, backing vocals
- Dennis Belfield – bass
- Duane Evans – acoustic piano, clavinet, fender rhodes, synthesizer, backing vocals
- Ron Bloom guitar
- Ron Krasinski – drums

2019 Silver Blue recording

- Benny Mardones – lead vocals
- Joel Diamond – producer

2019 Silver Blue remixes

- Benny Mardones – lead vocals
- Dirty Werk – remixer
- Eric Kupper – remixer

== Other versions ==
In 1983, the French Canadian singer Véronique Béliveau sings in French under the title Nuit d'août (translated into French: "August Night") for her album Transit.

Nick Kamen covered the song for his 1987 debut album Nick Kamen.

In 1991, reggae singer Junior Tucker had a No. 46 Australian hit with the song, re-titled "16 (Into the Night)".

In 1992, Taiwan's Harlem Yu released a cover version of the song on his album Harlem Music Station.

In 1995, Australian singer Peter Wilson released a cover of the song as a single.

In 1996, the group Fiji included a version of the song on their album Born and Raised.

In 2020, Julio Iglesias Jr. and Benny Mardones, before his passing, recorded the song as a duet for Julio's album, Under The Covers, released in 2022. The recording is dedicated in memory of Mardones.

== Sampling ==
The chorus to the 1992 song "Tsahan tsasn" ("White Snow") by Kalmyk singer-songwriter and composer Arkady Mandjiev features a progression influenced from "Into the Night".

Rapper Triple J used the melody and interpolated "Into the Night" for his song "16 Years Old".

The song was sampled by indie hip hop group Conrad Hilton on the song "Into the Night/Heat of the Night" and Decoy's version of "Into the Night", both of which feature Benny Mardones in the songs.

The song was sampled by Usher in his 2010 song "Making Love (Into the Night)" on the album Raymond v. Raymond.

American band Pure Bathing Culture interpolates part of the melody and refrain of "Into the Night" in their song "Scotty" from the 2013 album Moon Tides.

== See also ==
- List of 1980s one-hit wonders in the United States
