= A Journey Through Time (album) =

Studio album by Benny Mardones
- Released: 17 September 2002
- Genre: Pop rock
- Label: Crazy Boy Records
- Producers: Greg Ross, Joel Diamond, Jim Ervin, Duane Evans, Robert Tepper

Benny Mardones chronology
Bless a Brand New Angel (1998)	A Journey Through Time (2002)	Let's Hear It for Love (2006)

A Journey Through Time is the seventh studio album from American singer Benny Mardones. It was released in 2002 by Crazy Boy Records.

== Background ==
A Journey Through Time was originally intended as the soundtrack to the Mardones' documentary "Into The Night: The Benny Mardones Story". However, the album became a loosely separated project, acting as a "musical biography". The album saw Mardones recording the songs that were important to him personally, whether they were new songs or covers. Mardones' illustrated their significance in the liner notes.

On the album, a new version of "Into the Night" was recorded, along with an acoustic version. The album featured the previously unrecorded song "Fool for Falling in Love", a song written by Mardones and Roy Orbison. The album also features new versions of past Mardones songs including "Sheila C." and "How Could You Love Me". A cover of the Diana Ross & the Supremes/The Temptations song "I'm Gonna Make You Love Me" is included.

"I Need a Miracle" received national airplay and charted on the American Adult Contemporary charts, peaking at No. 30 in late 2002. The song "I Want It All" also entered the American Adult Contemporary charts, where it peaked at No. 25 in early 2003. In an August 2002 issue of Billboard, it was reported that the "I Need a Miracle" single had almost four dozen Adult Contemporary outlets who were believers in the song during its first week of release. It was also noted that this was rare for the format and that the record was therefore already garnering major attention.

== Critical reception ==
Professional ratings
Review scores
Source	Rating
AllMusic	3/5 stars

AllMusic stated: "This functions a bit as a musical biography, but it's a newly-written one, since all of the songs are new recordings. It's cleanly produced, but not extravagantly so, and Mardones sings with conviction, giving this real spine; if the new version of "Into the Night" is not a patch on the original - which, even if it flies under the radar, is so popular for a reason - it is hardly embarrassing, and the acoustic version reveals that Mardones can still breathe life into a song he's sung countless times. Throughout Journey Through Time he does this, singing his past as if it were his present. This may not win over doubters - after all, his powerful arena rock voice may have limited appeal - but for fans, this is a revealing and successful look back at his career, and a worthy companion to the documentary which, unfortunately, has yet to be released on video."

Upon release, Billboard reviewed the "I Need a Miracle" single, commenting: ""I Need a Miracle" is clearly a post-Sept. 11 anthem of hope and perseverance, and the mid-tempo showcases the edgy vocalist delivering an emotive performance - think a slightly more mellow Joe Cocker. But the real appeal for many AC stations is the "tribute" version of the song, which contains numerous statements of overt patriotism from "random" Americans. It's a tried-and-true formula that has worked before - remember Dennis DeYoung's "Desert Moon"? - and while it may be perceived as pretty cheesy at points, the song certainly works hard to tug at the heartstrings - and at what better time, with the first anniversary of our nation's greatest tragedy a mere month away."

== Track listing ==
No.	Title	Writer(s)	Length
1.	"Into the Night (2002 Version)"	Benny Mardones, Robert Tepper	4:25
2.	"I Need a Miracle"		3:50
3.	"I Want It All"	Barbara Orbison, Jörgen Elofsson	4:07
4.	"Unfinished Symphony"		4:53
5.	"Tonight"		3:46
6.	"I'm Gonna Make You Love Me"	Kenneth Gamble, Jerry Williams, Jerry Ross	3:37
7.	"Baby Don't"		4:20
8.	"Fool for Falling in Love"	Mardones, Roy Orbison	4:34
9.	"The World Can Change"		4:48
10.	"If I Could Have My Way"		5:10
11.	"Sheila C."	Mardones, Tepper, Duane Evans	4:46
12.	"Into the Night (Acoustic)"	Mardones, Tepper	4:06
13.	"How Could You Love Me (Bonus Track)"	Mardones, Evans	4:58

== Charts ==
=== Singles ===
"I Need a Miracle"

Chart (2002)	Peak position
U.S. Billboard Adult Contemporary	30

"I Want It All"

Chart (2002)	Peak position
U.S. Billboard Adult Contemporary	25

== Personnel ==
- Benny Mardones - vocals
- Greg Ross - producer, executive producer
- Joel Diamond, Duane Evans, Robert Tepper - producer
- Jim Ervin - keyboards, percussion, producer
- Jim Brickman - guest artist
- Mike Jackson - guitar, backing vocals
- Angie Jeree Singers, D.L. Byron - backing vocals
- Tamara Walker - vocals
- Bruce Cox - piano
- Kinny Landrum - keyboards
- Paul Levante, Bruce Watson - guitar
- Lance Morrison, Dean Rispler - bass
- Mark Levy - drums
- Tommy Oliver - orchestration
- Jesse Cannon, Csaba Petocz - engineer
- Alan Douches - mixing
