= Volto! =

American rock jam band

VOLTO!
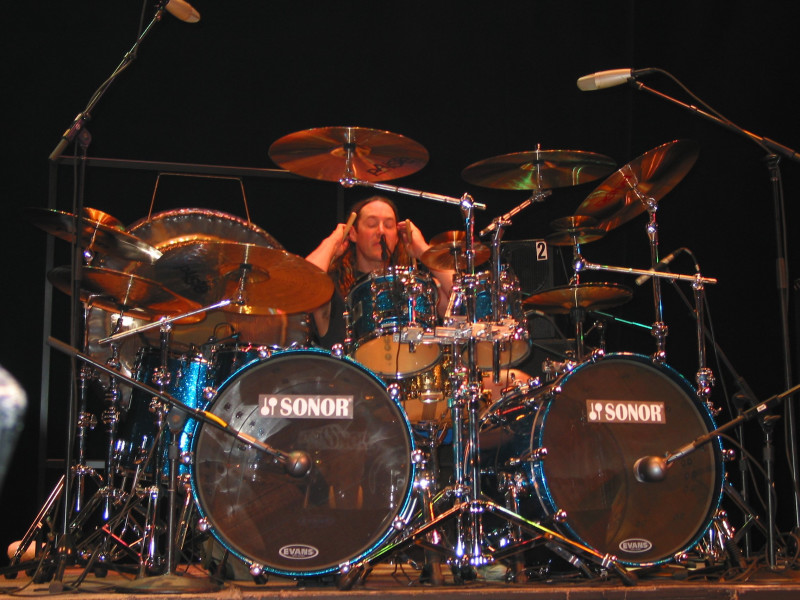
- Danny Carey performing with Volto! in 2005

Background information
- Origin: Los Angeles, United States
- Genres: Rock; jazz fusion; jam band; progressive rock
- Labels: Fantasy, Concord
- Members: Danny Carey; John Ziegler; Lance Morrison; Matt Rohde
- Website: voltoband.com

Volto! (often stylized VOLTO!) is an American rock jam band based in Los Angeles, California. First formed in the early 2000s, the current lineup consists of Lance Morrison on bass, Danny Carey (Tool) on drums, Matt Rohde on keyboards, and John Ziegler on guitars. Carey and Ziegler previously played together in Pigmy Love Circus and in jam sessions at a jazz club in Southern California's San Fernando Valley with Morrison.

== Discography ==
Albums

- Incitare (2013)

Music videos "Tocino" (2013)

== Personnel ==
- Danny Carey – drums
- Lance Morrison – bass
- Matt Rohde – keyboards
- John Ziegler – guitars
