= Thank God for Girls (album) =

Studio album by Benny Mardones
- Released: 1978
- Genre: Pop rock
- Length: 36:19
- Label: Private Stock
- Producer: Andrew Loog Oldham

Benny Mardones chronology
Thank God for Girls (1978)	Never Run, Never Hide (1980)

Thank God for Girls is the 1978 debut studio album from American singer Benny Mardones.

== Background ==
In 1977, Mardones met Richie Havens at Woodstock, who was impressed with the singer and offered him the slot of opening act on his upcoming tour. During the tour, Mardones caught the attention of producer Andrew Loog Oldham and the President of Private Stock Records, Larry Utall. A record contract was offered and Mardones ended up signing with Private Stock Records. Produced by Oldham, Mardones recorded his debut Thank God for Girls for the label. It was released in 1978; however, it failed to live up to expectations after the label went out of business shortly after its release.

"Susquehanna Lady" was released as a single from the album, however it failed to make any commercial impact. The album features covers of the Alessi Brothers song "All for a Reason" and the Bee Gees' "I Started a Joke". "All for a Reason" was released as a promotional single from the album. Mardones would later re-record "Hold Me Down" for his follow-up album Never Run, Never Hide. Mick Ronson provided guitar on the album, while drums were provided by Humble Pie drummer Jerry Shirley.

== Release ==
Thank God for Girls was originally released on vinyl in America and France only. Prior to the album's release, a limited edition four-track 12" vinyl sampler was released, featuring the tracks "All for a Reason", "Thank God for Girls", "I Started a Joke" and "Timeless". The release was advertised as a "Pre-Release Limited Edition Collector's EP" and was pressed on yellow colored vinyl.

The album remained out-of-print for many years. Later, Warrior Records issued the album for the first time on CD.

== Reception ==
Professional ratings
Review scores
Source	Rating
AllMusic	3/5 stars
Billboard	positive
Cash Box	positive

Upon release, Cash Box commented: "Mardones' songs deal explicitly with matters of the heart. Be it the exuberant title cut or introspective ballads such as "Timeless", Mardones displays a poignant flair for romanticism unequaled in today's music scene." Billboard described the album as "smooth and pop commercial", with Mardones "appealing to the young crowd". They added: "Mardones' own influences come from many sources, from the Bee Gees to Bob Seger. Mardones is especially strong on big rockers where he can build the intensity." The magazine picked the title track, "Susquehanna Lady" and "All for a Reason" as the "best cuts".

== Track listing ==
No.	Title	Writer(s)	Length
1.	"All for a Reason"	Billy Alessi, Bobby Alessi	5:10
2.	"Your Own Man"	Benny Mardones, David Leigh Byron	4:02
3.	"From Your Heart"	Mardones, Byron	3:34
4.	"Thank God for Girls"	Mardones, Hayden Wayne, Byron	5:21
5.	"I Started a Joke"	Barry Gibb, Robin Gibb, Maurice Gibb	5:09
6.	"Susquehanna Lady"	Mardones, Byron	5:07
7.	"Hold Me Down"	Mardones, Wayne, Byron	3:18
8.	"Timeless"	Mardones, Michael Wendroff	4:38

== Personnel ==
- Benny Mardones - vocals
- Mick Ronson - guitar
- Ron Frangipane - keyboards
- Hayden Wayne - keyboards, backing vocals
- Joey Stann - saxophone
- Mike Neville - bass
- Jerry Shirley - drums
- David Byron, Kimberley Carlson, Merle Miller, Erin Dickins - backing vocals

Production

- Andrew Loog Oldham - producer
- Carmine Rubino, Matt Murray, Neil Ceppos, Tom Mark - engineers
- Ron Frangipani - arranger
- Dom Romeo - mastering engineer
- Jim Massey - creative director
- Neil Terk - art direction
- B. Arnold - design
- Jim Houghton - photography
