= Scott Shannon =

American radio personality and record promoter (born 1947)

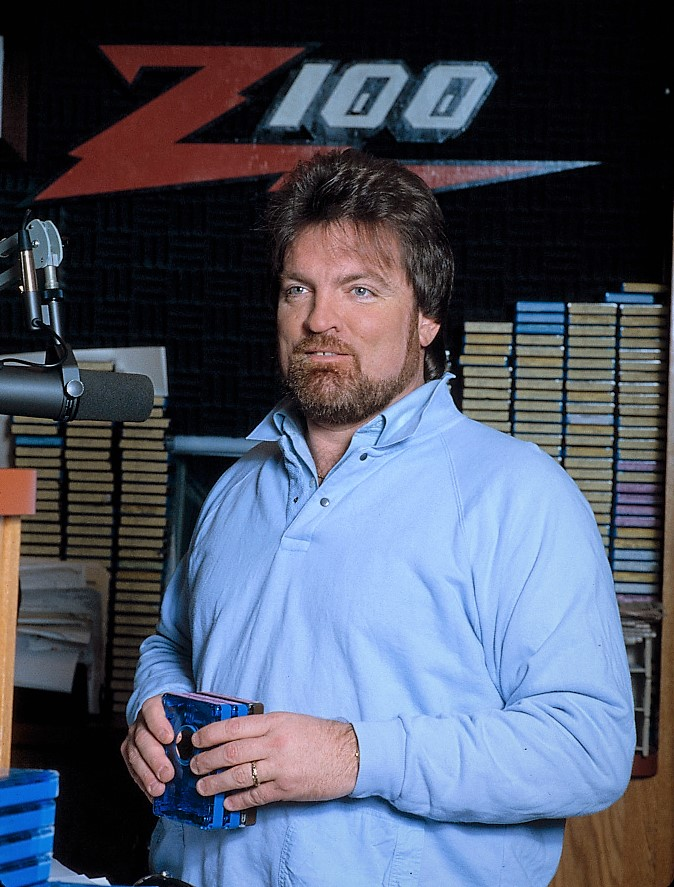
- Shannon in 1985
- Born: Michael Scott Shannon; July 25, 1947 (age 79); St. Louis, Missouri, U.S.
- Occupation: radio personality, record promoter
- Years active: since 1970

Michael Scott Shannon (born July 25, 1947) is an American radio disc jockey best known as the announcer of The Sean Hannity Show. He also hosted the morning show for WCBS-FM in New York City from 2014 to 2022 as well as Scott Shannon Presents America's Greatest Hits which is syndicated nationally with United Stations Radio Networks and Audacy. He previously worked for WHTZ, WPLJ, and The True Oldies Channel.

== Early radio career ==
Born in St. Louis, Missouri, Shannon grew up in Indianapolis, Indiana. He began his radio career at WFBS (1450 AM) in Spring Lake, North Carolina, which was later WMRV, while serving in the U.S. Army. From there he moved to WCLS (1580 AM) in Columbus, Georgia. After leaving the Army, Shannon worked full-time in radio at WABB in Mobile, Alabama, where he acquired the name Super Shan.

After a brief stint at WMPS in Memphis, he moved to Nashville, where he was the evening disc jockey at WMAK (1300 AM), later becoming that station's program director.

== Record-promotion career ==
Shannon left Nashville to take a job as a record promoter with Casablanca Records, and while there in 1977 recorded an album with Jack (Stack-A-Track) Grochmal. Calling themselves "Wildfire", they scored a number-49 hit on the Billboard Hot 100 remaking a 1959 Jerry Keller song titled "Here Comes Summer". Scott returned to radio in Washington, D.C., as program director of WPGC-FM, taking that station to the number-one spot in the Arbitron ratings. From there he moved to WQXI in Atlanta. Then, in Tampa, Florida, Scott, along with partner Cleveland Wheeler, developed the morning zoo radio format while at WRBQ-FM, a station known as "Q105". Again, he dominated in the ratings, this time making his station one of the most listened to in the United States. He was also primarily responsible for the renaissance of the musical career of vocalist Charlene, whose song "I've Never Been to Me" he revived by his programming of the long-dormant track.

Shannon also hosted a "Where are they now?" radio program in 1989, where the subject of the day was the one-hit wonder Benny Mardones, who had the 1980 hit "Into the Night". Scott began putting the record in rotation in 1989, and soon after, many other DJs around the nation added the song to their playlists. The song re-entered the top 20 singles chart, prompting a resurgence in Mardones's career, including a new re-recording of the song, a tour, and a new album.

== The Morning Zoo ==
Shannon is particularly known within the broadcasting industry for his work creating the "morning zoo" concept which debuted in Tampa in the early 1980s on WRBQ. The Q Morning Zoo show with Scott and Cleveland Wheeler was the template for hundreds of morning shows across America using the concept and name. For a period of time the trademark for the name "Morning Zoo" was owned by Edens Broadcasting, the owners of WRBQ during that period.

Shannon then took the concept to startup WHTZ (Z100) in New York City in 1983. Along with former disc jockey Ross Brittain of WABC's Ross & Wilson Show, he founded the Z Morning Zoo. He was the driving force in helping Z100 become the top-rated FM station in New York City within a mere 74 days of signing on the air. During this period, he served as one of the original VJs on VH1.

== Rockin' America ==
In 1984, Shannon started hosting Westwood One's weekly Scott Shannon's Rockin' America: The Top 30 Countdown on over 200 radio stations. This rapidly proved a popular show with its own countdown chart style and comic character element, known as "Mr. Leonard" (John Rio). The show used its own chart and was very close to the Radio & Records Magazine CHR Top 30 chart, albeit from two weeks before the broadcast weekend. The final show to air using its own compiled chart was for the weekend of August 28–30, 1987, which was very similar to the R&R chart published in the issue dated August 14, 1987.

Beginning with the broadcast of September 4–6, 1987 the countdown switched from its own compiled countdown to the R&R CHR Top 30 chart; however, it used the chart from two weeks earlier. Thus, for this broadcast, the R&R chart used was that published in the issue dated August 21, 1987. This continued into 1990.

When the show was renamed Scott Shannon's All Request Top 30 Countdown in mid-1990, the show utilized a hybridized chart. Since the shows were recorded two weeks in advance, request data and the R&R CHR Top 30 chart were used to predict where songs would place on the chart during the broadcast weekend, giving the show more flexibility to add fast-climbing songs to its playlist despite the two-week production delay, while removing songs that were performing poorly.

In March 1992, Shannon left Westwood One Radio Networks; this effectively brought an end to the show. He went on to start a new show named Scott Shannon's Battle of the Hits, produced by Cutler Productions and aired over the July 4th weekend in 1992. The show was aimed to bring new life into the top 40 countdown format which had been struggling right along with the top 40 format.

Rockin' America aired in the United Kingdom - proving particularly popular in Scotland - on Northants 96, Chiltern Radio where it was replaced by American Top 40, Signal Radio where it conversely replaced AT40, Marcher Sound, Radio Tay and Moray Firth Radio, Radio Wyvern, Radio Clyde where it was supported by McEwan's Lager, West Sound, Radio Forth, TFM and very briefly on Viking Radio. When it was first imported to the UK it was supported by Coca-Cola, although it was taken by fewer ILR stations than the UK-produced US chart show fronted by Paul Gambaccini and sponsored by Pepsi.

== Pirate Radio ==
In 1989, Shannon left WHTZ for Los Angeles to start up KQLZ, branded as "Pirate Radio". Pirate Radio employed a "Rock 40" concept, a top 40 format that emphasized hard rock and heavy metal music. As the 1990s began, top 40 radio overall experienced a decline, and Pirate Radio struggled in the Los Angeles ratings. Ultimately, Shannon was forced out of KQLZ in early 1991 and the station switched to conventional album-oriented rock.

== Return to New York ==
In 1991, Shannon returned to New York and resurfaced on Z100's biggest rival, WPLJ. This station had also been struggling since its glory days of the mid 1980s, and he became program director and morning drive co-host. At the outset, the station — whose direct rival was Z100 — used the slogan "Mojo Radio", downplaying the WPLJ call letters. This approach, however, was eventually changed. As part of WPLJ's makeover, Shannon copied a top 40 format sweeping the country that was geared more toward the adult contemporary audience, brought in co-host Todd Pettengill to form The Big Show, and began re-emphasizing the WPLJ call letters. While the station did well in the suburbs, it never caught on in New York City proper and was constantly tweaked during Shannon's tenure. On February 7, 2014, he departed from WPLJ.

Also in the 1990s, Shannon also served as a radio consultant for WPLY in Philadelphia and WKCI-FM in New Haven, Connecticut.

On February 25, 2014, WCBS-FM (CBS-FM) in New York announced that Scott Shannon would be hosting a brand new morning show entitled Scott Shannon in the Morning starting March 3. Upon the release of the first run of ratings after Shannon took over at WCBS-FM, his show was rated number one, although most of the audience was already established since CBS-FM was doing very well ratings-wise before Shannon's arrival. Shannon carried over the "Big Show" name from WPLJ.

In October 2014, United Stations Radio Networks announced that Shannon would host their new syndicated radio program Scott Shannon Presents America's Greatest Hits, a four-hour classic hits program featuring music of the 1970s, 1980s, and 1990s. Features include special countdowns on various topics or from the particular week from a past year, artist interviews, and other features such as one-hit wonders and hit cover versions of previous hit recordings. The new program premiered the weekend of November 1, 2014.

Shannon is also the host of the True Oldies Channel radio network and is the announcer for talk radio's The Sean Hannity Show.

On October 28, 2022, Shannon announced he was stepping down as the morning host of WCBS-FM and hosted his last show two months later on December 16, 2022.

On December 15, 2023, United Stations Radio Networks announced that Shannon's America's Greatest Hits program will end on December 31, 2023.

== Z100 documentary ==
Scott Shannon is featured prominently in a documentary film chronicling the launch and early success of WHTZ. Worst to First: The True Story of Z100 was directed by Mitchell Stuart and features interviews with Shannon, Z100 staff, other radio personalities, and recording artists including Tony Orlando, Madonna, and Debbie Gibson. The film was released to various VOD services on February 11, 2022.

== Awards and honors ==
Shannon is one of several disc jockeys honored in an exhibit at the Rock and Roll Hall of Fame in Cleveland, Ohio. In 2000, FMQB, a radio trade magazine, named Shannon "Program Director of the Century".

In 2003, he was inducted into the National Association of Broadcasters Hall of Fame in Washington, D.C., and in 2006 he was inducted into the National Radio Hall of Fame in Chicago.

In September 2010, Shannon was named Network/Syndicated Personality of the Year at the 2010 National Association of Broadcasters' Marconi Radio Awards.
