= Robert Tepper =

American singer-songwriter (b. 1950)

- Born: Robert Tepper; 30 May 1950 (age 76); Bayonne, New Jersey, U.S.
- Other names: Bobby Tepper; Robert Tepper
- Labels: Scotti Bros., MTM Music
- Children: 5
- Musical career
- Genres: Hard rock, AOR, soft rock, pop rock, rock
- Occupations: musician, songwriter, bassist, singer
- Instruments: bass guitar (early), vocals (tenor)
- Years active: 1980 — present
- Formerly of: Iron Butterfly (1990—1992)
- Website: roberttepper.net

Robert Tepper (born 30 May 1950) is an American songwriter, recording artist and singer, best known for his hit song "No Easy Way Out" from the Rocky IV motion picture soundtrack. He is also known for co-writing the hit song "Into the Night" with Benny Mardones.

== Life and career ==
Tepper was born in Bayonne, New Jersey on 30 May 1950.

He paired up with fellow singer Benny Mardones, and together they wrote Mardones' hit ballad Into the Night. Tepper then worked with Mardones on writing the latter's follow-up album Too Much to Lose in 1981.

In 1985, Tepper signed with Scotti Brothers and moved to Los Angeles. Actor/director Sylvester Stallone was taken with Tepper's song "No Easy Way Out", which subsequently led to its inclusion in the movie Rocky IV and to his song "Angel of the City" to be included in Stallone's 1986 film Cobra. "No Easy Way Out" climbed into the Top 40, reaching #22 on Billboard's Hot 100 in 1986, and momentarily putting Tepper in the public eye. Several European labels, including Ministry of Sound, released "No Easy Way Out" with their own dance versions, resulting in regular airplay on German radio stations that continues today (in particular evening dance and party programming in Munich featured on Charivari 95.5 and Radio Gong 96.3). The heavy metal group Bullet For My Valentine also recorded the song in 2008. Tepper released two solo albums for Scotti Bros. Records, but both albums received little promotion from the label. In 1986, one year after Rocky IV, another song from Tepper's debut album (titled No Easy Way Out) called "Angel of the City" became the insert montage song of Stallone´s film Cobra. Also in 1986, he co-wrote the single "Le Bel Age" for Pat Benatar, which peaked at #54 on the Billboard charts. A second album, Modern Madness was released in 1988. He went on to join the classic hard rock group Iron Butterfly for a few years. His third solo album No Rest For The Wounded Heart was released exclusively in Europe in 1996 on the MTM Music label.

In 2009, Sony/BMG re-released his first two albums digitally.

In 2012, he released his fourth solo album titled New Life Story. The music is a departure from the big rock sound of the 1980s and has been described as "acoustic, singer/songwriter with an electric tinge."

In 2023, Robert and musician/business partner Chris Cameron started Red Eye Syndicate LLC, a music licensing company.

Tepper lives in Los Angeles and has five children.

== Discography ==
=== Albums ===
- No Easy Way Out (Scotti Bros., 1985) Billboard 200 #144
- Modern Madness (Scotti Bros., 1988)
- No Rest for the Wounded Heart (MTM Music, 1996)
- New Life Story (2012)
- Better Than the Rest (AOR Heaven, 2019)
- Feels Like Monday (Heavy Breather, 2022)

=== Singles ===
Year	Title	Peak chart positions		Album
Year	Title	Hot 100	Mainstream Rock	Album
1986	"No Easy Way Out"	22	12	No Easy Way Out
1986	"Don't Walk Away"	85	—	No Easy Way Out
1986	"Angel of the City"	—	—	No Easy Way Out
1986	"If That's What You Call Lovin'"	—	—	No Easy Way Out
1988	"The Unforgiven"	—	—	Modern Madness
1988	"When You Dream of Love"	—	—	Modern Madness
2015	"Ain't No Rules"	—	—	Non-album singles
2017	"Looking for the Love"	—	—	Non-album singles
2018	"Whose Lonely Now"	—	—	Non-album singles
