= List of songs recorded by Amy Lee =

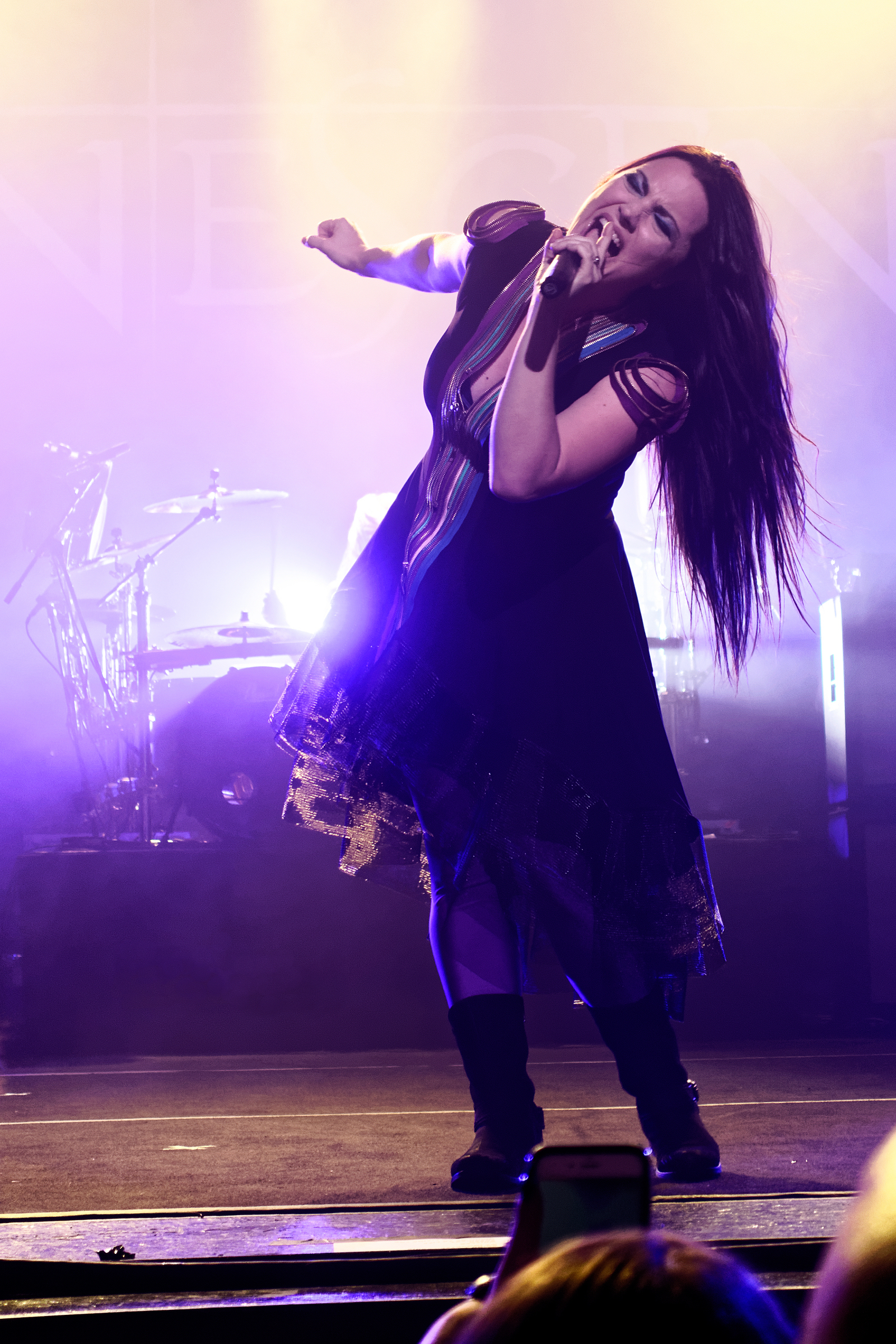
Amy Lee performing with Evanescence in Los Angeles, 2015.

American singer-songwriter and pianist Amy Lee has written and recorded music for two studio albums, released one extended play, and featured on three tribute albums, including Nightmare Revisited (2008).

In 2004, Lee recorded guest vocals for Seether's single "Broken" and Korn's 2007 acoustic rendition of "Freak on a Leash", which reached number twenty and 89 on Billboard Hot 100 respectively.

After leaving Evanescence's record label Wind-up Records in 2014, Lee announced on Twitter that she and Evanescence were independent artists. That year, she composed music for the film War Story (2014), and released the soundtrack album Aftermath featuring Dave Eggar. It reached number 47 on Billboard 200 and produced one promotional single called "Lockdown". Lee has also collaborated with Eggar on the films Indigo Grey: The Passage (2015) and Blind (2017). Lee also co-wrote "Speak to Me" with Michael Wandmacher for the film Voice from the Stone (2016).

In 2016, Lee released her debut extended play titled Recover, Vol. 1, which features four cover songs, including Led Zeppelin's "Going to California", "With or Without You" by U2, "Baby Did a Bad Bad Thing" by Chris Isaak, and Portishead's "It's a Fire". Later that year, Lee collaborated with several members of her immediate family to record the children's album Dream Too Much. The album includes eight original songs and four covers songs. The title track was released as a promotional single.

"Love Exists" is an English rendition of "L'amore esiste" by Francesca Michielin released as a stand-alone single in February 2017. Lee has also provided guest vocals and-co-written for songs by Lindsey Stirling in 2019, and Body Count, Wagakki Band and Bring Me the Horizon in 2020.

== Released songs ==
Key
†	Indicates single release
‡	Indicates song written solely by Amy Lee
#	Indicates promotional single release
•	Indicates song containing non-English lyrics

Song	Artist(s)	Writer(s)	Release(s)	Year	Ref.
"After" (Note: Song is an instrumental track and/or contains no lyrics.)	Amy Lee (featuring Dave Eggar)	Dave Eggar; Chuck Palmer	Aftermath	2014	
"Alice"	Amy Lee	Amy Lee ‡	Dream Too Much	2016	
"All About Anna"	Cellogram (featuring Amy Lee and K'noup)	Dave Eggar; Chuck Palmer	Cellogram	2018	
"Baby Did a Bad Bad Thing (Note: "Baby Did a Bad Bad Thing" is a 1996 song originally performed by Chris Isaak.)	Amy Lee	Chris Isaak	Recover, Vol. 1	2016	
"Beacon for the Blind"	Amy Lee, Dave Eggar and Chuck Palmer	Amy Lee; Dave Eggar; Chuck Palmer	Blind (Original Motion Picture Soundtrack)	2018	
"Bee and Duck"	Amy Lee	Amy Lee ‡	Dream Too Much	2016	
"Between Worlds"	Amy Lee (featuring Dave Eggar)	Dave Eggar; Amy Lee; Chuck Palmer	Aftermath	2014	
"Between Worlds"	Amy Lee (featuring Dave Eggar)	Dave Eggar; Amy Lee; Chuck Palmer	Indigo Grey: The Passage (Film score)	2015	
"Bill’s Wife Theme"	Amy Lee, Dave Eggar and Chuck Palmer	Amy Lee; Dave Eggar; Chuck Palmer	Blind (Original Motion Picture Soundtrack)	2018	
"Blind Opening Theme"	Amy Lee, Dave Eggar and Chuck Palmer	Amy Lee; Dave Eggar; Chuck Palmer	Blind (Original Motion Picture Soundtrack)	2018	
"Break In"	Halestorm (featuring Amy Lee)	Lzzy Hale; Aimée Proal; Rob Graves; Mark L. Holman	Halestorm Reimagined	2020	
"Broken" †	Seether (featuring Amy Lee)	Shaun Morgan; Dale Stewart	Disclaimer II	2004	
"Broken" †	Seether (featuring Amy Lee)	Shaun Morgan; Dale Stewart	The Punisher: The Album	2004	
"Can't Stop What's Coming"	Amy Lee (featuring Dave Eggar)	Amy Lee; Chuck Palmer; Dave Eggar	Aftermath	2014	
"Dark Water" •	Amy Lee (featuring Malika Zarra)	Amy Lee; Dave Eggar; Chuck Palmer	Aftermath	2014	
"Donkey and Chicken"	Amy Lee	Amy Lee ‡	Dream Too Much	2016	
"Dream of Ice"	Amy Lee, Dave Eggar and Chuck Palmer	Amy Lee; Dave Eggar; Chuck Palmer	Blind (Original Motion Picture Soundtrack)	2018	
"Dream Too Much" #	Amy Lee	Amy Lee; Lori Lee	Dream Too Much	2016	
"Drifter"	Amy Lee (featuring Dave Eggar)	Amy Lee; Dave Eggar	Aftermath	2014	
"First Kiss"	Amy Lee, Dave Eggar and Chuck Palmer	Amy Lee; Dave Eggar; Chuck Palmer	Blind (Original Motion Picture Soundtrack)	2018	
"Freak on a Leash"†	Korn (featuring Amy Lee)	Reginald Arvizu; Jonathan Davis; James Shaffer; David Silveria; Brian Welch	MTV Unplugged: Korn	2007	
"Going to California" (Note: "Going to California" is a 1971 song originally performed by Led Zeppelin.)	Amy Lee	Jimmy Page; Robert Plant	Recover, Vol. 1	2016	
"Goodnight"	Amy Lee	Amy Lee ‡	Blitz Locals	2000	
"Goodnight My Love" (Note: "Goodnight My Love" is a 1956 song originally performed by Jesse Belvin.)	Amy Lee	George Motola; John Marascalco	Dream Too Much	2016	
"Halfway Down the Stairs" (Note: "Halfway Down the Stairs" is a 1976 song originally performed by Jerry Nelson, as Robin the Frog, from The Muppet Show. It is an adaptation of "Halfway Down", a 1926 poem, by A. A. Milne.)	Amy Lee	Harold Fraser-Simon; Alan Alexander Milne; A. A. Milne	Muppets: The Green Album	2011	
"Hello, Goodbye" (Note: "Hello, Goodbye" is a 1967 song originally performed by The Beatles.)	Amy Lee	Lennon-McCartney	Dream Too Much	2016	
"Honeypot"	Amy Lee, Dave Eggar and Chuck Palmer	Amy Lee; Dave Eggar; Chuck Palmer	Blind (Original Motion Picture Soundtrack)	2018	
"I'm Not Tired"	Amy Lee	Amy Lee; Lori Lee	Dream Too Much	2016	
"I'll Never be Ready"	Veridia (featuring Amy Lee)	Deena Jakoub; Taylor Hill	The Beast You Feed	2018	
"I'm So Lonesome I Could Cry" (Note: Lee performed a live covered Johnny Cash's 1949 song, "I'm So Lonesome I Could Cry" in 2012. The version that appears on We Walk the Line: A Celebration of the Music of Johnny Cash was recorded at a concert at the Moody Theater in Austin, USA.)	Amy Lee	Hank Williams	We Walk the Line: A Celebration of the Music of Johnny Cash	2012	
"If You're a Star"	Amy Lee	Amy Lee; Joshua W. Hartzler	Dream Too Much	2016	
"It's A Fire" (Note: "It's a Fire" is a 1994 song originally performed by Portishead.)	Amy Lee	Geoff Barrow; Beth Gibbons; Adrian Utley	Recover, Vol. 1	2016	
"Little Bird"	Amy Lee	Amy Lee; John Lee	Dream Too Much	2016	
"Lockdown" #	Amy Lee (featuring Dave Eggar)	Amy Lee; Chuck Palmer	Aftermath	2014	
"Love Exists" † (Note: "Love Exists" is an English translation of "L'amore esiste", a 2015 song originally performed by Francesca Michielin.)	Amy Lee	Amy Lee; Fortunato Zampaglione; Michele Canova	Non-album single	2017	
"Love Goes On and On" †	Lindsey Stirling (featuring Amy Lee)	Lindsey Stirling; Alexander Seaver; Amy Lee	Artemis	2019	
"Love Hurts" † (Note: "Love Hurts" is a 1960 song originally performed by the Everly Brothers.)	Amy Lee & Dave Stewart	Boudleaux Bryant	Non-album single	2022	
"Mark’s Theme"	Amy Lee, Dave Eggar and Chuck Palmer	Amy Lee; Dave Eggar; Chuck Palmer	Blind (Original Motion Picture Soundtrack)	2018	
"Missing You"	Big Dismal (featuring Amy Lee)	Eric Durance; Chuck She	Believe	2003	
"Now I Know"	Renholdër (featuring Amy Lee)	Danny Lohner	Underworld Soundtrack	2003	
"One Day the Only Butterflies Left Will Be in Your Chest As You March Towards Your Death"	Bring Me the Horizon (featuring Amy Lee)	Oliver Sykes; Jordan Fish; Amy Lee	Post Human: Survival Horror	2020	
"Push the Button"	Amy Lee	Amy Lee ‡	Aftermath	2014	
"Remember to Breathe"	Amy Lee (featuring Dave Eggar)	Dave Eggar	Aftermath	2014	
"Resurrection"	Amy Lee	Unknown (Note: Writing credits for this song have not been confirmed.)	Indigo Grey: The Passage (Film score)	2015	
"Rubber Duckie" (Note: "Rubber Duckie" is a 1970 song originally performed by Jim Henson, as Ernie, from Sesame Street.)	Amy Lee	Jeff Moss	Dream Too Much	2016	
"Sakura Rising" •	Wagakki Band (featuring Amy Lee)	Yuko Suzuhana; Machiya; Amy Lee	Tokyo Singing	2020	
"Sally's Song" (Note: "Sally's Song" is a 1993 song originally performed by Catherine O'Hara, as Sally, from The Nightmare Before Christmas (1993).)	Amy Lee	Danny Elfman	Nightmare Revisited	2009	
"Shaving"	Amy Lee, Dave Eggar and Chuck Palmer	Amy Lee; Dave Eggar; Chuck Palmer	Blind (Original Motion Picture Soundtrack)	2018	
"Speak to Me" †	Amy Lee	Amy Lee; Michael Wandmacher	Voice from the Stone soundtrack	2017	
"Stand by Me" (Note: "Stand by Me" is a 1960 song originally performed by Ben E. King.)	Amy Lee	Ben E. King; Jerry Leiber and Mike Stoller	Dream Too Much	2016	
"The End of the Book"	Amy Lee	Amy Lee; John Lee; Joshua W. Hartzler; Lori Lee	Dream Too Much	2016	
"The Final Leap"	Amy Lee	Amy Lee ‡	Blind (Original Motion Picture Soundtrack)	2018	
"Through Your Eyes"	Amy Lee	Amy Lee ‡	Blind (Original Motion Picture Soundtrack)	2018	
"Voice in My Head"	Amy Lee (featuring Dave Eggar)	Amy Lee; Dave Eggar	Aftermath	2014	
"With or Without You" (Note: "With or Without You" is a 1987 song originally performed by U2.)	Amy Lee	Bono	Recover, Vol. 1	2016	
"When I'm Gone"	Body Count (featuring Amy Lee)	Tracy Marrow; Vincent Dennis; Will Dorsey; Amy Lee; Will Putney	Carnivore	2020	
"White Out"	Amy Lee (featuring Dave Eggar)	Dave Eggar; Chuck Palmer	Aftermath	2014	

== Unreleased songs ==
Key
•	Indicates song scheduled to be released

Song	Artist(s)	Writer(s)	Originating album	Year
"Amie" (Note: "Amie" is a 1973 song originally performed by Pure Prairie League.)	Amy Lee	Craig Fuller	Dream Too Much	2016
"Death Dealer's Descent" (Note: "Death Dealer's Descent" and "Down in the Lab" were still released on the Underworld Soundtrack in 2003 but without Lee's vocals.)	Renholdër (featuring Amy Lee)	Danny Lohner	Underworld Soundtrack	2003
"Down in the Lab"	Renholdër (featuring Amy Lee)	Danny Lohner	Underworld Soundtrack	2003
"Find a Way"	Amy Lee	Amy Lee; Dave Eggar	Unknown	2013
"I Will Follow You into the Dark" (Note: "I Will Follow You into the Dark" is a 2006 song originally performed by Death Cab for Cutie.)	Amy Lee	Ben Gibbard	—N/a	2016
"Move On Up" (Note: "Move On Up" is a 1971 song originally performed by Curtis Mayfield.)	Angélique Kidjo (Note: All artists who performed at the Nobel Peace Prize Concert 2011 joined Angélique Kidjo on stage to perform "Move On Up" as the finale.)	Curtis Mayfield	—N/a	2011
"Legends Never Die" (Note: "Legends Never Die" is a 2017 song by the Riot Games Music Team for the 2017 League of Legends World Championship. Lee's version was scrapped and replaced by Against the Current.)	Amy Lee	Alex Seaver; Justin Tranter	—N/a	2017
"Power" (Note: A reworked version of "Power" was released in 2007 by Black Light Burns called "Coward".)	The Damning Well (featuring Amy Lee)	Richard Patrick	—N/a	2003
"The Cartoon Network Song"	Amy Lee	Amy Lee ‡	—N/a	2004
"Your Love"	Amy Lee	Amy Lee; Tim McCord	Unknown	2009

== Bootleg covers ==
The following includes bootleg recordings of live cover songs from concerts, which were not officially released by Lee or under any other legal authority.

Song	Year recorded	Original artist	Notes
"One Thing"	2007	Finger Eleven	Performed during Finger Eleven's opening set for Evanescence's The Open Door Tour in Providence, Rhode Island
"Epiphany"	2007	Staind	Performed with Aaron Lewis during My Coke Fest in Johannesburg, South Africa
"Break In"	2012	Halestorm	Performed with Lzzy Hale during the Carnival of Madness tour
"Chains of Love"	2013	Ryan Adams	Performed with Paula Cole at a benefit concert in Rockport, Massachusetts
"Old Man"	2013	Neil Young	Performed with Paula Cole at a benefit concert in Rockport, Massachusetts
"Green Pastures"	2013	Emmylou Harris	Performed with Paula Cole at a benefit concert in Rockport, Massachusetts
"Both Sides, Now"	2013	Joni Mitchell	Performed with Paula Cole at a benefit concert in Rockport, Massachusetts
"With a Little Help From My Friends"	2013	The Beatles	Performed with Paula Cole at a benefit concert in Rockport, Massachusetts
"You've Got a Friend"	2013	Carole King	Performed with Paula Cole at a benefit concert in Rockport, Massachusetts
"Birdcage"	2014	Dave Eggar	Performed with Eggar at Bluegrass Underground
"Jacob's Visions"	2014	Dave Eggar	Performed with Eggar at Bluegrass Underground
"Cat's in the Cradle"	2017	Harry Chapin	Performed during Ugly Kid Joe's set at Graspop Metal Meeting
"Shatter Me"	2018	Lindsey Stirling (featuring Lzzy Hale)	Performed during the Synthesis Live tour with Lindsey Stirling

== See also ==
- List of songs recorded by Evanescence
- Evanescence discography
