= Amy Lee discography =

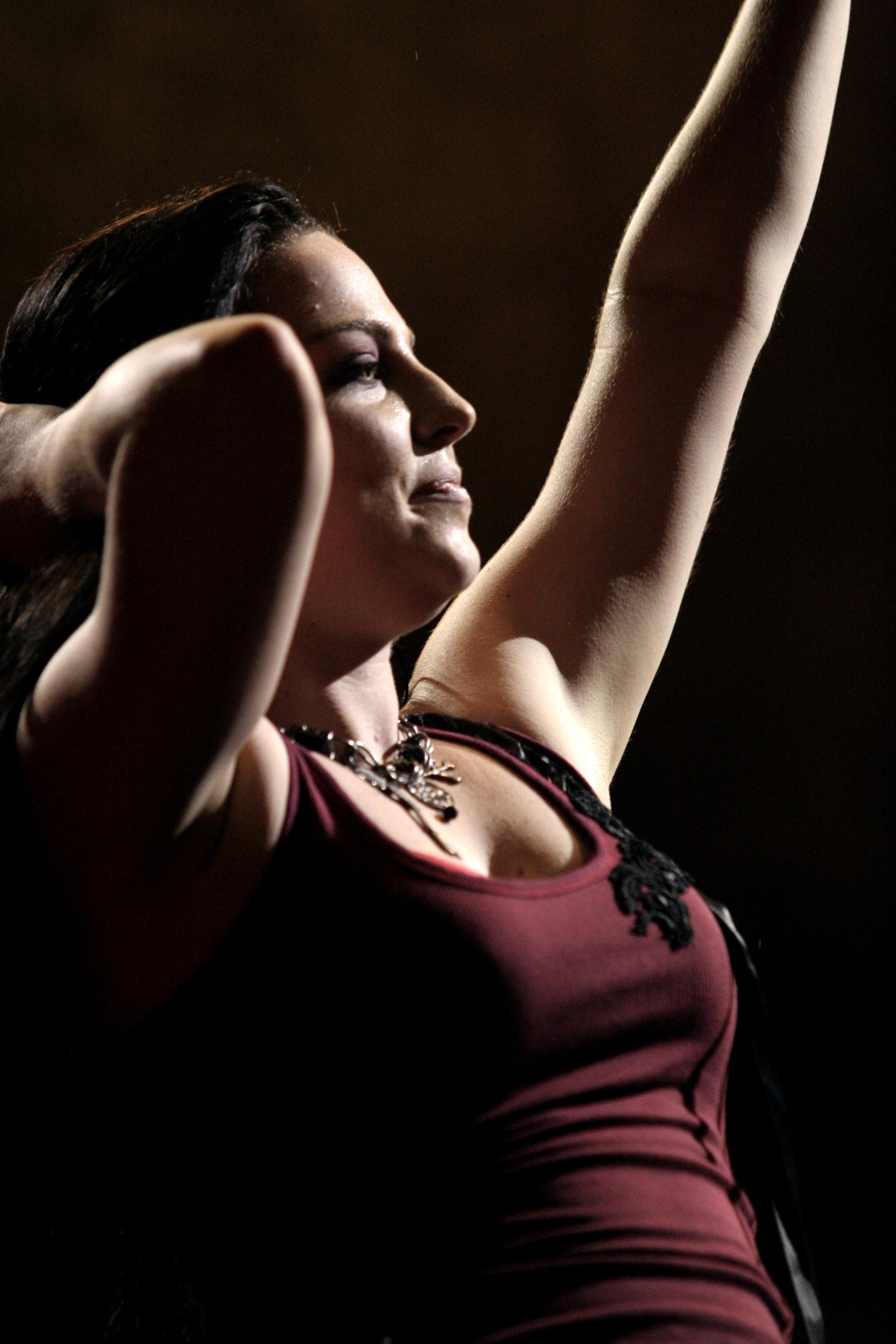
- Lee performing on stage in São Paulo in 2007
- Studio albums: 1
- EPs: 1
- Soundtrack albums: 1
- Tribute albums: 3
- Singles: 7
- Music videos: 15
- Promotional singles: 2
- Film scores: 4

American singer-songwriter, pianist and composer Amy Lee has released two studio albums, one extended play, five singles, two promotional singles, eight music videos and composed four film scores. Lee is also the co-founder and lead vocalist of the rock band Evanescence.

In 2004, Lee provided guest vocals on Seether's single "Broken", which reached number twenty on Billboard Hot 100. She then collaborated with Korn in 2007 on an acoustic rendition of "Freak on a Leash", which reached number 89 on Billboard Hot 100. Lee has also appeared on three tribute albums: Nightmare Revisited (2008), Muppets: The Green Album (2011) and We Walk the Line: A Celebration of the Music of Johnny Cash (2012).

During Evanescence's hiatus in 2013, Lee composed music for the film War Story, and released the soundtrack album Aftermath (2014) featuring Dave Eggar and promotional single "Lockdown". Aftermath reached number 47 on Billboard 200. In 2015, Lee and Eggar teamed up again on the score for Indigo Grey: The Passage, which won Best Film Score at the Moondance International Film Festival. In 2016, she released her debut extended play, Recover, Vol. 1, featuring four cover songs, as well as the children's album Dream Too Much. She released her second solo single "Speak to Me", from the film Voice from the Stone, in 2017.

== Albums ==
=== Studio albums ===
List of studio albums with selected chart positions
Title	Album details	Peak chart positions					
Title	Album details	US	BEL (WA)	BEL (FL)	NLD	ITA	UK
Aftermath	Released: August 25, 2014; Label: Self-released; Format: Digital download	47	153	132	92	49	67
Dream Too Much	Released: September 30, 2016; Label: Amazon; Formats: Digital download, CD	—	—	—	—	—	—

== Extended plays ==
List of extended plays with relevant details
Title	EP details
Recover, Vol. 1	Released: February 19, 2016; Label: Self-released; Format: Digital download

== Singles ==
=== As lead artist ===
List of singles as featured artist, showing year released and album name
Title	Year	Peak chart positions									Album
Title	Year	US Bub.	US Dig.	US Hard Rock Dig.	US Hard Rock	US Main	US Rock	NZ Hot	UK	UK Sales	Album
"Dream Too Much"	2016	—	—	—	—	—	—	—	—	—	Dream Too Much
"The End of the Book"	2016	—	—	—	—	—	—	—	—	—	Dream Too Much
"If You're a Star"	2016	—	—	—	—	—	—	—	—	—	Dream Too Much
"Love Exists"	2017	—	—	—	—	—	—	—	—	—	Non-album singles
"Speak to Me"	2017	—	—	—	—	—	35	—	—	—	Non-album singles
"Love Hurts" (with Dave Stewart)	2022	—	—	—	—	—	—	—	—	—	Non-album singles
"Hand That Feeds" (with Halsey)	2025	—	21	—	—	—	49	34	—	45	Ballerina
"End of You" (with Poppy and Courtney LaPlante)	2025	25	5	1	1	1	18	13	93	11	Non-album single
"—" denotes a recording that did not chart or was not released in that territory.

=== As featured artist ===
List of singles as featured artist, showing year released and album name
Title	Year	Peak chart positions							Certifications	Album
Title	Year	US	AUS	AUT	NLD	NZ	SWI	UK	Certifications	Album
"Broken" (Seether featuring Amy Lee)	2004	20	3	26	30	2	27	106	RIAA: 4× Platinum; ARIA: Platinum; BPI: Silver	Disclaimer II
"Freak on a Leash" (Korn featuring Amy Lee)	2007	89	—	—	—	—	—	—		MTV Unplugged: Korn
"Break In" (Halestorm featuring Amy Lee)	2020	—	—	—	—	—	—	—		Halestorm Reimagined
"—" denotes a recording that did not chart or was not released in that territory.

=== Promotional singles ===
List of promotional singles, showing year released and album name
Title	Year	Album
"Lockdown" (featuring Dave Eggar)	2014	Aftermath
"Dream Too Much"	2016	Dream Too Much

== Other appearances ==
=== As lead artist ===
List of non-single appearances, showing year released and album name
Song	Year	Release
"Goodnight"	2000	Blitz Locals
"Sally's Song"	2008	Nightmare Revisited
"Halfway Down the Stairs"	2011	Muppets: The Green Album
"I'm So Lonesome I Could Cry"	2012	We Walk the Line: A Celebration of the Music of Johnny Cash

=== As featured artist ===
List of non-single guest appearances, showing other artist(s), year released and album name
Title	Year	Other artist(s)	Album
"Missing You"	2003	Big Dismal	Believe
"Broken"	2004	Seether	The Punisher: The Album
"All About Anna"	2018	Cellogram featuring K'noup	Cellogram
"When I'm Gone"	2020	Body Count	Carnivore
"Sakura Rising"	2020	Wagakki Band	Tokyo Singing
"One Day the Only Butterflies Left Will Be in Your Chest as You March Towards Your Death"	2020	Bring Me the Horizon	Post Human: Survival Horror
"Love Goes On and On"	2022	Lindsey Stirling	Artemis
"1000 Years"	2023	Bush	The Art of Survival (Deluxe Edition)
"The Reckoning"	2024	Within Temptation	Worlds Collide Tour – Live in Amsterdam

== Music videos ==
=== As lead artist ===
List of music videos, showing year released and director
Song	Year	Director	Link
"It's a Fire" (Portishead cover)	2015	Eric Ryan Anderson	
"With or Without You" (U2 cover)	2015	Eric Ryan Anderson	
"Going to California" (Led Zeppelin cover)	2015	Eric Ryan Anderson	
"Baby Did a Bad, Bad Thing" (Chris Isaak cover)	2015	Eric Ryan Anderson	
"Dream Too Much"	2016	Stefano Bertelli	
"If You're a Star"	2016	Stefano Bertelli	
"The End of the Book"	2016	Stefano Bertelli	
"Speak to Me"	2017	Eric D. Howell	
"Love Hurts" (with Dave Stewart)	2022	Dave Stewart	
"Hand That Feeds" (with Halsey)	2025	Hannah Lux Davis	
"End of You" (with Poppy & Courtney LaPlante)	2025	Jensen Noen	

=== Guest appearances ===
List of music videos, showing year released and director
Song	Year	Director	Link
"Broken" (Seether featuring Amy Lee)	2004	Nigel Dick	
"God's Gonna Cut You Down" (Johnny Cash)	2006	Tony Kaye	
"Freak on a Leash" (Korn featuring Amy Lee)	2007	Alex Coletti	
"Break In" (Halestorm featuring Amy Lee)	2020	Unknown	
"Vaccinated" (Kyle Gass)	2021	Unknown	
"Love Goes On and On" (Lindsey Stirling featuring Amy Lee)	2022	Stephen Wayne Mallett and Lindsey Stirling	
"The Fire Within" (Within Temptation)	2022	SetVexy	

== Film scores ==
List of appearances by Lee as a composer, showing year released, director and album name
Year	Film	Director	Album	Notes
2014	War Story	Mark Jackson	Aftermath	Featuring composer Dave Eggar.
2015	Indigo Grey: The Passage	Sean Robinson	—N/a	With composers Dave Eggar and Chuck Palmer. Includes the songs "Between Worlds" and "Resurrection".
2016	I Am Her	Sasha Pezenik	—N/a	With composers Dave Eggar and Chuck Palmer.
2017	Blind	Michael Mailer	Blind (Original Motion Picture Soundtrack)	With composers Dave Eggar and Chuck Palmer. Includes the songs "Through Your Eyes" and "The Final Leap".
