= Speak to Me (Amy Lee song) =

Single by Amy Lee
- Released: March 17, 2017
- Recorded: 2017
- Studio: Skywalker Ranch (Nicasio, California)
- Length: 4:35
- Songwriters: Amy Lee; Michael Wandmacher

Amy Lee singles chronology
| "Love Exists" (2017) | "Speak to Me" (2017) | "Break In" (2020) |

Music video
- "Speak to Me" on YouTube

"Speak to Me" is a song by American singer-songwriter Amy Lee recorded for the independent film Voice from the Stone (2017). It was made available for digital download on March 17, 2017. Lee collaborated with the film's score producer Michael Wandmacher and director Eric Dennis Howell, with whom she got acquainted to Voice from the Stone and its plot. Inspired by the film's storyline, which she could relate to as a recent mother, Lee decided to contribute to the soundtrack with an original song. Musically, "Speak to Me" is a piano ballad instrumentally complete with strings, booming drums and cellos, and is lyrically from the perspective of the deceased protagonist communicating to her child. The song was featured in the end credits of the film.

"Speak to Me" received critical acclaim from music critics, who praised Lee's performance, its cinematic sound and poignancy. Lee collaborated with Howell on the music video, which was shot at the same location as the film, in Siena. It serves as a parallel backstory to the film, and features Lee singing and playing the piano near an ancient castle and scenes of her walking in the surroundings with a boy. The visual received positive feedback from critics who felt that it was a fitting accompaniment to the song's overall musical style and the film's tone.

== Background ==
After she and her band Evanescence left their record label and became independent in 2014, Lee worked on solo music and film scores, including writing music for the film War Story (2014) and releasing the soundtrack album Aftermath from the film. In October 2015, Lee stated that she was working on solo music, and that "It feels really good to have a lot of different things going on at once in the sense that I feel like I’m not just flexing one muscle".

In August 2015, it was revealed that Lee would write music for the ending credits of the independent film Voice from the Stone, directed by Eric Dennis Howell. In 2016, she started recording and finalizing the song; a video of her composing the song at Skywalker Ranch, where she played the piano and rehearsed the vocals was uploaded on her official YouTube channel on April 11, 2016. The video also featured various scenes of the film itself set to snippets from the song. "Speak to Me" premiered on March 17, 2017 when it was also available for digital download on iTunes Store and several other digital music outlets. The digital single contains two versions of the song, the first one being the one featured in the film and the second one being the studio recording of the song. Initially written only as the ending song of the film, "Speak to Me" was also used in the trailer after Howell and Wandmacher were both satisfied with the final result.

== Recording and composition ==
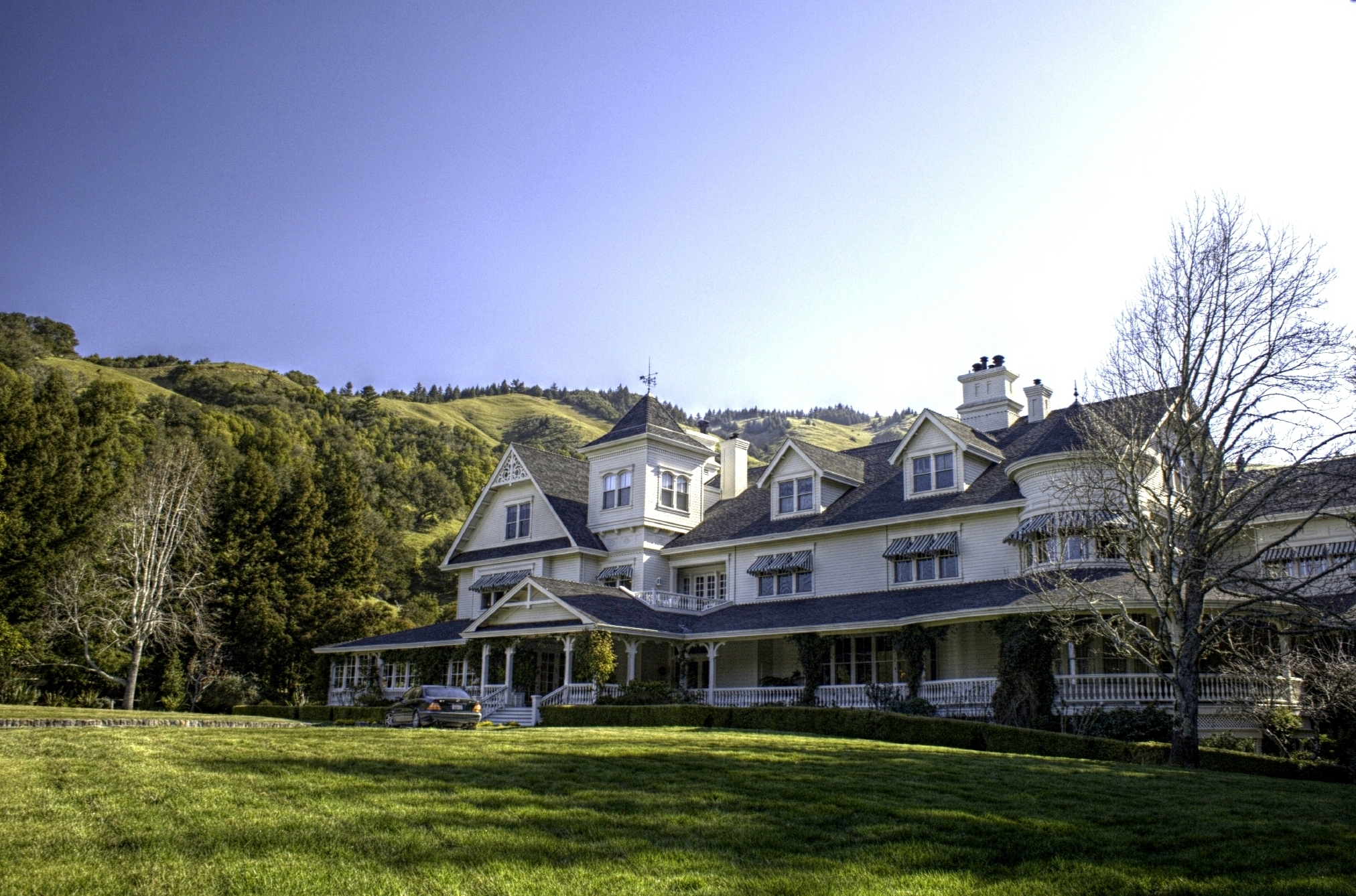
A picture of the Skywalker Ranch where "Speak to Me" was written and composed

Lee was initially contacted by the film's director to write music for it. Closely related with both the director of the film, Eric Howell, and the composer of its musical score, Michael Wandmacher, Lee had a conversation with both and "felt a surge of inspiration and immediately began writing" shortly afterwards. Lee elaborated how it was "a rare phenomenon to really share a creative vision so completely, and that made for a very powerful experience, and an end result that I am very proud of". She watched an unedited and incomplete version of Voice from the Stone in order to see if she would want to contribute to the film's score; Lee was impressed by it.

Since Voice from the Stone follows the story of a nurse trying to help a mute young boy who has recently lost his mother speak again, Lee felt that the plot "resonated very deeply" with her due to the fact that she had recently become a mother. The song she was asked to write was meant to illustrate the child's deceased mother's perspective and the feelings of unlimited love that extend even beyond death. In the film, the mother's character is a classical singer and a piano player who also enjoyed the perks of motherhood; Lee expressed her compatibility with the given description, saying, "There is no way that this could have been more me! It's meant to be me, it has to be me, and I'm writing this song!". The singer further added that "it wasn't a stretch, in any way, for me to put myself exactly in the spot where I needed to be to write this song".

Lee talked to the director and the score composer on the phone to discuss their opinions of what they think the ending song should sound like and Lee went to the piano right afterwards, conceiving the initial idea in an hour. She sent it to them afterwards and they both agreed that it is the direction they want to get on. Lee was invited to Skywalker Ranch which also served as the place where the film's audio mixing was being handled. Lee went to record there for three days which marked the first time she had separated from her recent child. She revealed that the situation "put me in exactly the right place, emotionally, to sing and write from that emotional place that I needed to be in". The recording studio and the scenery at the ranch were the ideal environment for the singer to finish the writing process. Whenever she would get a writer's block composing at the piano, Lee would bike into the forest, during which she would "feel the beauty of earth and loneliness, at the same time". "Speak to Me" was completely recorded in two weeks.

"Speak to Me" is a piano-led ballad which features Lee's vocals which were described as "haunting". Besides piano, its instrumentation is also provided by subtle strings as well as low-sounding drums and cellos which according to Billboard's Gil Kaufman "amp up the track's tension". According to Kaufman, the "chilling" song marked a return "into the spooky zone" for Lee. He further found her "signature emotion-choked vocals" present over the track's "haunting" piano line. Similar sentiments were offered by Riddhi Chakraborty from Rolling Stone India who felt that "Spoke to Me" marked a return to Lee's "signature style of powerhouse vocals combined with delicate piano", which he found to be similar to some of Evanescence's song, particularly "My Immortal" (2003) and "Lithium" (2006). Lyrically, the song finds the protagonist calling a "departed, ghostly" love as exemplified in the lyrics, "We are one breath apart, my love / And I'll be holding in it till we're together / Hear me call your name / Just speak, speak to me".

== Critical reception ==
Billboard's Gil Kaufman: "It's the perfect shot of Celtic-tinged gothic balladry for fans of Lee's band". Vanessa Vallon, writing for the website AXS noted that "Speak to Me" served as a demonstration by Lee of her "versatility"; she further described her vocal performance on the song as "gorgeously plead[ing]". Mike Wass from the music blog Idolator, deemed the song to be "strikingly beautiful" and noted how it "evokes the gothic drama and emotional intimacy of 'My Immortal'". Music Week journalist Ben Homewood felt that it would be an understatement to say that the song's usage in the trailer for the film "heightens the drama on display". Writing for LemonWire, Jessica Tamez praised Lee's vocals, describing them as "liquid gold to say the very least" and adding that she managed to convey the same "intensity and beauty" characteristics of all her work. Tamez went on to praise the singer for her ability "adequately capture the depth of a situation and magnify that with such elegance [which] distinguishes her amongst fellow artists" and observed that the melody of "Speak to Me" managed to be a fitting accompaniment to the film's profundity. Keith Spera from The Advocate described the song as "lush".

"Speak to Me" was one of the songs shortlisted by Oscar voters for the Academy Award for Best Original Song, but did not make the final nominations.

== Music video ==
A music video for the song was filmed in Siena in Italy, which also served as the filming location for Voice from the Stone. Lee collaborated with Howell on the video and they both imagined it as a "parallel and backstory to the film" which explores the relationship between the main protagonist and her son, played by Lee's son Jack, and the notion that "love is stronger than death". The five-minute video features Lee singing and performing the song on a piano at an ancient castle in Tuscany, Italy, and walking around its surroundings. It opens with a close-up black-and-white shot of Lee lip-syncing the song's lyrics. She is later seen walking with a seemingly lonely child at a garden. For the clip, Lee is dressed in a medieval-styled gown which she co-designed with the Voice from the Stone costume designer.

The clip premiered on Lee's official YouTube channel on March 27, 2017. According to Chad Childers from Loudwire, it served as a proof that she was "certainly embracing the vibe and the feel" of the song. McKenzie Dillon from the website MXDWN, who described the song itself as "hauntingly beautiful" felt that its visual "follows the same tone". Lindy Smith from the Alternative Press summarized the clip as "visually-stunning" and "enchanting".

== Live performances ==
"Speak to Me" was performed during the encore of the set list of Evanescence's Synthesis Tour (2017–18). The performance featured Lee playing the piano accompanied by an orchestra.
