= Silvio Raffo =

Italian writer and translator (born 1947)

Silvio della Porta Raffo
- Born: December 6, 1947 (age 78); Rome, Italy
- Occupations: Writer, translator and teacher
- Years active: 1960s-present

Silvio Raffo (born December 7, 1947) is an Italian writer and translator. He is the most prolific translator of English and American women writers from English to Italian. A screen adaptation of his 1996 novel Voice from the Stone has been directed by Eric Howell.

== Life and career ==
Silvio Raffo was born in Rome, Italy. He graduated from the Università Cattolica with a thesis on Latin language. In 1986 he founded the literary club "La Piccola Fenice" in Varese. A poet, writer and translator, he has lectured in Italy, Switzerland and Norway, and is a visiting professor in London.

He was shortlisted for the Strega Prize in 1997 for his novel La voce della pietra , and has won several poetry prizes, including the Premio Gozzano, Premio Cardarelli, Premio Montale, Premio Ada Negri, and Premio Jean Vigo. He has long contributed to the leading Italian publishing house Mondadori as a translator and essayist. For Mondadori he translated into Italian Emily Dickinson's works, for which he is best known.

He currently lives in Varese and is a former teacher of Italian literature at Liceo Ernesto Cairoli. He has presented stage performances with his former student Silvia Bottini.

== Poet ==
He published his first poetry collection in 1976, followed by many others, notably Lampi della visione and L'equilibrio terrestre, both for Crocetti Editore. His work was praised, among others, by the Nobel Prize-candidate poet Maria Luisa Spaziani.

== Novelist ==
A prolific novelist, he has published eight novels, among which are La voce della pietra (Voice from the Stone, 1996), shortlisted for the Premio Strega in 1997, and Virginio, both published by Il Saggiatore. When it first came out, Voice from the Stone was greatly praised by the English novelist Muriel Spark.

== Translator and essayist ==
To date, he is the most prolific translator of English women writers, having so far translated works by Emily Dickinson, Christina Rossetti, Edna St. Vincent Millay, Emily Brontë, Dorothy Parker, and Sara Teasdale, who he first translated and had published in Italy. The result of his many years' studies on Emily Dickinson, he published in 2009 the essay "La Sposa del Terrore" (The Terror's Bride). A new biography of the poet of Amherst is going to be published in 2011.

== The Premio Guido Morselli ==
In 2008, in Varese, together with professor and researcher Ms Linda Terziroli, he established the "Premio Guido Morselli", both a literary award and a series of conferences concerning the work of Guido Morselli, a writer whose novels were published only after his suicide in 1974.

== Voice from the Stone and Hollywood ==
In 2010, a screen adaption of his 1997 novel, Voice from the Stone, was announced. The novel was adapted for the screen by Mark Wheaton and produced by Dean Zanuck and Stefano Gallini. According to the Internet Movie Database, the film originally had Japanese cult movie director Hideo Nakata set to direct until Eric Howell, director of Academy Award 2010 shortlisted film Ana's Playground, took over the helm.

Emilia Clarke stars in the supernatural thriller.

== Selected bibliography ==
=== Poetry ===
- "Lampi della visione", Crocetti Editore, 1988
- "L'equilibrio terrestre", Crocetti Editore, 1992
- "Maternale", Nem, 2007

=== Novels ===
- "Lo specchio attento", Edizioni Studio Tesi, 1987
- "La voce della pietra", Il Saggiatore, 1996
- "Virginio", Il Saggiatore, 1997
- "Eros degli inganni", Bietti, 2010
- "Voice from the Stone", ebook version , 2017

=== Translations ===
- "Oscar Wilde: tutti i racconti", Newton & Compton, 1997
- "Emily Dickinson: tutte le poesie", Meridiani Mondadori, 1999
- "Christina Rossetti: nostalgia del cielo", Le Lettere, 2001
- "Brontë: poesie", Mondadori, 2004

=== Essays ===
- "Donna, mistero senza fine bello", T.E. Newton, 1994
- "Poesia", Zanichelli, 2001
- "La Sposa del terrore", Hermaion, Book Editore, 2009
- "Io sono nessuno", Le Lettere, 2011
