= List of awards and nominations received by Evanescence =

Evanescence awards and nominations
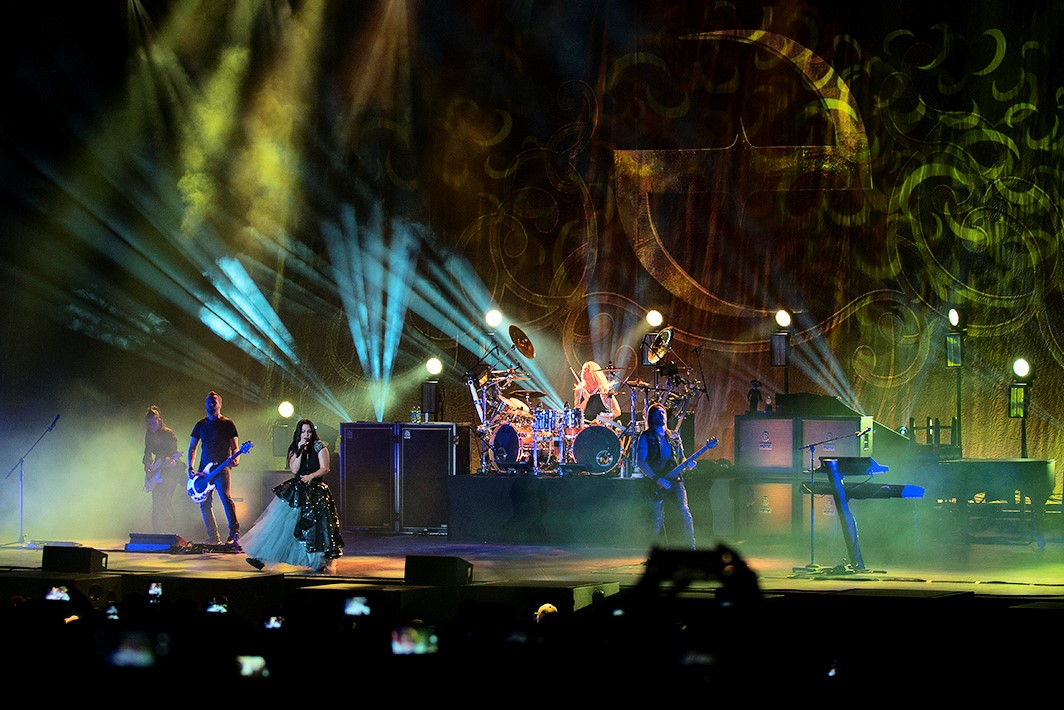
- Evanescence performing in Verona, Italy in 2019
Awards and nominations
Award	Wins	Nominations
American Music Awards	0	3
Billboard Music Awards	2	3
Brit Awards	0	1
Danish Music Awards	1	1
ECHO Awards	2	3
Grammy Awards	2	7
International Dance Music Awards	0	1
Kerrang! Awards	1	5
Loudwire Music Awards	3	7
MTV Video Music Awards	0	7
MTV Europe Music Awards	0	6
Los Premios MTV Latinoamérica	2	4
MTV Australia Awards	1	1
MTV Asia Awards	0	2
MuchMusic Video Awards	1	2
NME Awards	1	1
NRJ Music Awards	2	4
Planeta Awards	1	2
Revolver Golden Gods Awards	1	4
Rock Sound Awards	1	1
Teen Choice Awards	2	2
World Music Awards	1	1

Totals (Note: Certain award groups do not simply award one winner. They acknowledge several different recipients, have runners-up, and have third place. Since this is a specific recognition and is different from losing an award, runner-up mentions are considered wins in this award tally. For simplification and to avoid errors, each award in this list has been presumed to have had a prior nomination.)
- Wins: 24
- Nominations: 68

American rock band Evanescence has won 24 awards and received 68 nominations from various organizations and publications. Founded in 1994 by singer and pianist Amy Lee and former guitarist Ben Moody, Evanescence's debut studio album, Fallen, was released in 2003.

After the success Fallen and their first single "Bring Me to Life", Evanescence won two Grammy Awards awards out of five nominations in 2004. The following year, the single "My Immortal" was nominated in the category of Best Pop Performance by a Duo or Group with Vocals. In 2008, The Open Door's "Sweet Sacrifice" received a nomination for Best Hard Rock Performance. Among other accolades, the band has also won three Loudwire Music Awards, a Kerrang! Award, a Revolver Golden Gods Music Award, a Rock Sound award, and received nominations for a Brit Award, three American Music Awards, and five MTV Video Music Awards.

== American Music Awards ==
The American Music Awards is an annual awards ceremony created by Dick Clark in 1973. Evanescence received one nomination in 2003 and two in 2004.

Year	Nominee / work	Award	Result
2003	Fallen	Favorite Pop/Rock Album	Nominated
2004	Evanescence	Favorite Pop/Rock Band/Duo/Group	Nominated
2004	Evanescence	Artist of the Year	Nominated

== Billboard Music Awards ==
The Billboard Music Awards is an honor given by Billboard, a publication and music popularity chart covering the music business. Evanescence was nominated in three categories for the 2003 event.

Year	Nominee / work	Award	Result
2003	Evanescence	New Group Artist of the Year	Won
2003	"Bring Me to Life"	Soundtrack Single of the Year	Won
2003	"Bring Me to Life"	Mainstream Top 40 Single of the Year	Nominated

== Brit Awards ==
The BRIT Awards are the British Phonographic Industry's annual pop music awards. Evanescence were nominated in one category on the ceremony.

Year	Nominee / work	Award	Result
2004	Evanescence	International Breakthrough Artist	Nominated

== Danish Music Awards ==
The Danish Music Awards are the most important music awards of Denmark. Evanescence has won once.

Year	Nominee / work	Award	Result
2004	Evanescence	Foreign Newcomer of the Year	Won

== Echo Awards ==
Echo Awards is a German music award granted every year by the Deutsche Phono-Akademie (an association of recording companies). Each year's winner is determined by the previous year's sales.

Year	Nominee / work	Award	Result
2004	Evanescence	International Group Of The Year	Won
2004	Evanescence	International Rock/alternative	Won
2004	Evanescence	International Newcomer Of The Year	Nominated

== Grammy Awards ==
Evanescence has won two awards out of seven nominations.

Year	Nominee / work	Award	Result
2004	Evanescence	Best New Artist	Won
2004	Fallen	Album of the Year	Nominated
2004	Fallen	Best Rock Album	Nominated
2004	"Bring Me to Life"	Best Hard Rock Performance	Won
2004	"Bring Me to Life"	Best Rock Song	Nominated
2005	"My Immortal"	Best Pop Performance by a Duo or Group with Vocals	Nominated
2008	"Sweet Sacrifice"	Best Hard Rock Performance	Nominated

== International Dance Music Awards ==
Year	Nominee / work	Award	Result
2004	"Bring Me to Life"	Best Alternative Rock Dance	Nominated

== Kerrang! Awards ==
The Kerrang! Awards is an annual music awards show in the United Kingdom, founded by the music magazine, Kerrang!. The awards feature a mixture of readers' and critics' awards. The annual Kerrang! Awards ceremony is usually held in mid-August in London. The annual awards ceremony features performances by prominent artists, and some of the awards of more popular interest are presented in a televised ceremony.

Year	Nominee / work	Award	Result
2003	Evanescence	Best International Newcomer	Won
2003	"Bring Me to Life"	Best Single	Nominated
2004	"Going Under"	Best Single	Nominated
2012	Evanescence	Best International Band	Nominated
2012	Amy Lee	Hottest Female	Nominated

== Loudwire Music Awards ==
Year	Nominee / work	Award	Result
2011	"What You Want"	Rock Song of the Year	Won
2011	Evanescence	Comeback of the Year	Won
2011	Evanescence	Artist of the Year	Nominated
2011	Evanescence	Rock Album of the Year	Nominated
2011	Amy Lee	Rock Goddess of the Year	Nominated
2012	Amy Lee	Rock Goddess of the Year	Won
2016	Amy Lee	Rock Goddess of the Year	Nominated

== MTV Awards ==
=== MTV Video Music Awards ===
The MTV Video Music Awards were established in 1984 by MTV to celebrate the top music videos of the year. Evanescence received seven nominations.

Year	Nominee / work	Award	Result
2003	"Bring Me to Life"	Best New Artist in a Video	Nominated
2003	"Bring Me to Life"	Best Rock Video	Nominated
2004	"My Immortal"	Best Rock Video	Nominated
2020	"Wasted on You"	Best Rock	Nominated
2021	"Use My Voice"	Best Rock	Nominated
2025	"Afterlife"	Best Rock	Nominated
2025	Evanescence	Best Group	Nominated

=== MTV Europe Music Awards ===
Year	Nominee / work	Award	Result
2003	"Bring Me to Life"	Best Song	Nominated
2003	Evanescence	Best Group	Nominated
2003	Evanescence	Best New Act	Nominated
2006	Evanescence	Best Rock	Nominated
2007	Evanescence	Rock Out	Nominated
2012	Evanescence	Best World Stage Performance	Nominated

=== Los Premios MTV Latinoamérica ===
Year	Nominee / work	Award	Result
2003	Evanescence	Best New Artist – International	Won
2003	Evanescence	Best Rock Artist – International	Nominated
2004	Evanescence	Best Rock Artist – International	Nominated
2007	Evanescence	Best Rock Artist – International	Won

=== MTV Australia Awards ===
MTV Australia Awards (previously known as the MTV Australia Video Music Awards or AVMA's) started in 2005 and is Australia's first awards show to celebrate both local and international acts. Evanescence won one award on the ceremony.

Year	Nominee / work	Award	Result
2007	The Open Door	Album Of The Year	Won

=== MTV Asia Awards ===
Year	Nominee / work	Award	Result
2004	Evanescence	Favorite Breakthrough Artist	Nominated
2004	Evanescence	Favourite Rock Act	Nominated

== MuchMusic Video Awards ==
The MuchMusic Video Awards is an annual awards ceremony presented by the Canadian music video channel MuchMusic.

Year	Nominee / work	Award	Result
2007	Evanescence	People's Choice: Favorite International Group	Nominated
2007	"Call Me When You're Sober"	Best International Video – Group	Won

== NME Awards ==
The NME Awards are an annual music awards show founded by the music magazine NME. Evanescence has received one award in 2013.

Year	Nominee / work	Award	Result
2013	Amy Lee	Hottest Woman	Won

== NRJ Music Awards ==
Year	Nominee / work	Award	Result
2004	Evanescence	Best International New Artist	Won
2007	Evanescence	Best International Group/Duo of the Year	Won
2007	The Open Door	Best International Album of the Year	Nominated
2007	"Call Me When You're Sober"	Music Video of the Year	Nominated

== Planeta Awards ==
The Planeta Awards is an annual Peruvian awards ceremony established by Radio Planeta. Evanescence has received one award from two nominations.

Year	Nominee / work	Award	Result
2007	Evanescence	Rock Artist of the Year	Nominated
2007	"Sweet Sacrifice"	Best Female Vocal Interpretation (Amy Lee)	Won

== Revolver Golden Gods Awards ==
The Revolver Golden Gods Awards is an annual awards ceremony held by Revolver, an American hard rock and heavy metal magazine.

Year	Nominee / work	Award	Result
2012	Amy Lee	Best Vocalist	Won
2012	Evanescence	Album of the Year	Nominated
2012	Evanescence	Comeback of the Year	Nominated
2012	Evanescence	Most Dedicated Fans	Nominated

== Rock Sound Awards ==
The Rock Sound Awards is a set of awards presented annually by Rock Sound magazine.

Year	Nominee / work	Award	Result
2023	Evanescence	Hall of Fame Award	Won

== Teen Choice Awards ==
The Teen Choice Awards is an awards show presented annually by the Fox Broadcasting Company.

Year	Nominee / work	Award	Result
2003	"Bring Me to Life"	Choice Music Rock Track	Won
2004	Evanescence	Choice Rock Group	Won

== World Music Awards ==
The annual World Music Awards, founded in 1989, is an international awards show that honors recording artists based on their worldwide sales figures, which are provided by the International Federation of the Phonographic Industry. On the ceremony Evanescence won one award.

Year	Nominee / work	Award	Result
2004	Evanescence	Best Rock Artist	Won
