= Silvia Bottini =

Italian actress and model

- Bottini in the image which became a meme
- Born: 1981 (age 43–44); Malnate, Varese, Italy
- Occupations: Actress; model
- Website: silviabottini.com

Silvia Bottini (born 1981) is an Italian actress and model. She has frequently collaborated with Silvio Raffo.

== Early life ==
Bottini was born in 1981 in the province of Varese, Italy. She first studied acting at the Liceo classico Ernesto Cairoli in Varese with Silvio Raffo and Anna Bonomi. She later won a scholarship to enter the Scuola di teatro Alessandra Galante Garrone in Bologna, graduating with her diploma in 2007.

== Career ==
Upon graduation, she joined Teatro della Tosse in Genoa as one of two applicants accepted out of 300. Some of her castings during this time were in Marco Manchisi's Il fantoccio, Alessandro Bergallo's Generazioni Componibili and Jon Fosse's Sonno (in Italian translation).

She has collaborated with Silvio Raffo on several projects, including stage performances of Ovid's poetry and other works.

Bottini moved to Los Angeles, in the U.S. in 2015. She is a cast member of the Italian Comedy Club in Los Angeles. Besides acting, she has also worked as a make-up artist. She worked on the Los Angeles part of the 2017 music video for "Senza Pagare" by J-Ax, Fedez, and T-Pain; the shoot also featured Paris Hilton, Pio e Amedeo, and Ferragni.

== Internet meme ==
In 2008, Bottini was in a relationship with a stock photographer. While they were vacationing in Shanghai, she modeled for several of his photos, including one with her crying. In 2011, she found that the stock photograph of her crying was being used as an Internet meme, satirizing people who complain about "First World problems" (for example, "there's not enough dressing on my salad"). Bottini initially disliked the meme as trivializing her acting career, especially since she received no royalties from them. By 2019, she told BBC News that she had reconciled with her Internet fame, and was working on a short film about the "First World Problems" character.

== Partial filmography ==
- Il cantico di Maddalena (2011)
- Fragile (2011)
- Bella addormentata (2012)
