= Indigo Grey: The Passage =

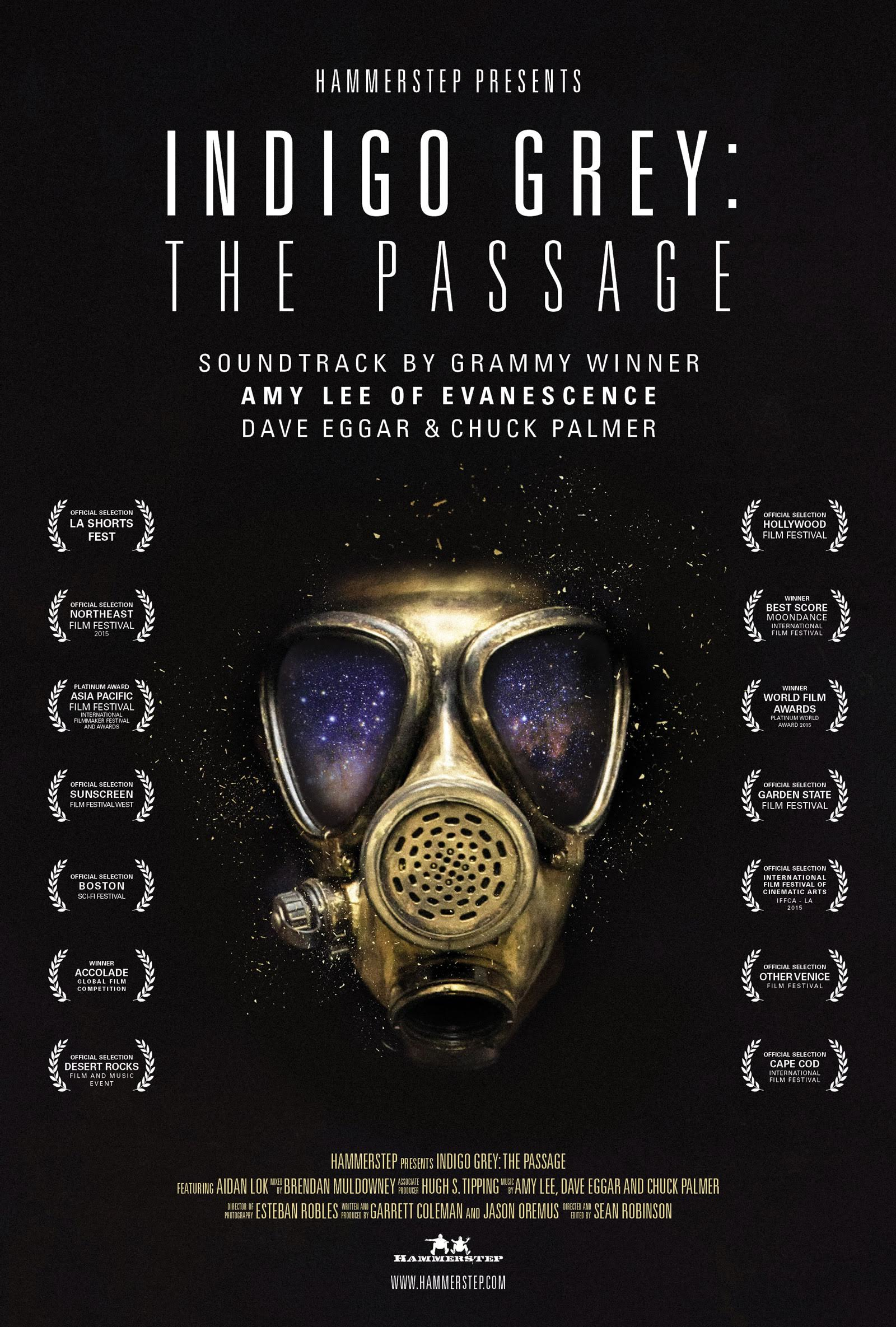
- Directed by: Sean Robinson
- Written by: Jason Oremus; Garrett Coleman
- Produced by: Jason Oremus; Garrett Coleman
- Starring: Adian Lok and Hammerstep
- Cinematography: Esteban Robles
- Edited by: Sean Robinson
- Music by: Amy Lee, Dave Eggar, Chuck Palmer
- Release date: September 2015
- Running time: 7 minutes
- Country: United States
- Language: English

Indigo Grey: The Passage is a 2015 American science fiction film directed by Sean Robinson and written and produced by Jason Oremus and Garrett Coleman. It features Aidan Lok, neo-Irish dance troupe Hammerstep, and has received international attention for its soundtrack composed by Amy Lee, Dave Eggar and Chuck Palmer.

ABC News announced the release of the film on September 15, 2015: "Evanescence's Amy Lee Composes Score to Short Film, 'Indigo Grey: The Passage.'" Robinson told Billboard on November 4, 2015: "Amy's involvement is what really catapulted the project, lending it more visibility than we expected. This film is about taking risks and exploring the lines between fantasy and reality, and by daring to embrace the unknown, we are empowered to experience a catharsis beyond the realm of convention." Rolling Stone interviewed Lee about the film November 5, 2015, publishing an article titled: "Evanescence singer-keyboardist Amy Lee realizes her long-term goal of film scoring with the soundtrack to sci-fi short "Indigo Grey: The Passage." Shortly after, ABC News quoted Lee on her score for the film: "Evanescence's Amy Lee Talks Composing Music for Choreography: "That Is Sort of Anti-Rock""

Out Magazine announced on January 8, 2016 that the film would be premiering at the Film Society of Lincoln Center. IrishCentral reviewed the film January 14, 2016 "Brilliant short film combines Irish dance and martial arts"

== Plot ==
"A Young boy's discovery of a mysterious gas mask provides a glimpse into an alternate reality."

== Critical reception ==
Huffington Post featured an in-depth review by music Journalist Morena Duwe, who wrote: "Whisking you away with its sweeping cinematography, the film was well edited, elegantly directed, and hypnotically choreographed to a riveting soundtrack. Indigo Grey: The Passage is a truly one-of-a-kind project that merges the worlds of film, dance, sci-fi, art and music. With its lack of dialogue, the young Lok's budding acting performance is extremely impactful as he relies solely on his emotional expression and movement to carry the narrative. A lavish feast of sensory stimulation, this short film has successfully captured the attention of its viewers by transporting them to another dimension and most impressively, all within its humble seven minutes." The film won the Thelma K. Bloch Award for the Arts at the 2015 Williamsburg Independent Film Festival.
