= Goodnight My Love (1956 song) =

Single by Jesse Belvin
- B-side: "I Want You With Me Xmas" (Reissued in 1957 with "Let Me Love You Tonight" as the B-side)
- Released: October 1956
- Recorded: 1956
- Genre: R&B
- Length: 3:06
- Label: Modern Records
- Songwriters: George Motola; John Marascalco
- Producer: John Marascalco

"Goodnight My Love" is a popular song written by George Motola and John Marascalco in 1956.

== Background ==
The song was originally recorded by Jesse Belvin and released in 1956. John Marascalco produced the recording for Modern Records. Some sources claim that Barry White - who would have been 11 years old at the time - played piano on this recording. However, in an interview in 1995, White denied this.

== Charts ==
The Jesse Belvin recording reached #7 on the US Billboard R&B chart in 1956. The McGuire Sisters cover, also released in 1956, reached #32 on Billboard's pop chart.

The Paul Anka 1968 recording reached #27 on the Billboard singles chart in a 10-week chart run in 1969. The single peaked at #18 on the Record World chart and #13 in Canada.

== Recorded versions ==
- Amy Lee Feat. John Lee on Dream Too Much (2016)
- Dee Dee Sharp 1963
- The Honeys 1969
- Jerry Vale 1969
- Jane Morgan 1969
- El DeBarge
- Paul Anka 1968
- Paula Abdul 1992
- Jesse Belvin 1956
- Earl Grant 1956
- Brook Benton 1968
- Tavares 1977
- Gloria Estefan 1994
- The Fleetwoods, whose 1963 version reached #32 on the U.S. Pop chart.
- The Four Seasons 1963
- Art Garfunkel 1996
- Jay and the Americans 1969
- Screamin' Jay Hawkins
- John Holt
- Ben E. King 1965
- Gladys Knight & the Pips
- Los Lobos 1987
- The McGuire Sisters 1956
- Little Milton 1984
- Aaron Neville 2012
- Rocke-Pelle with Sigurd Jansen and his Rockin' Five. Recorded in Oslo on June 20, 1958. Released on the single Fontana 268 003 TF
