= Amy Lee =

American musician (born 1981)

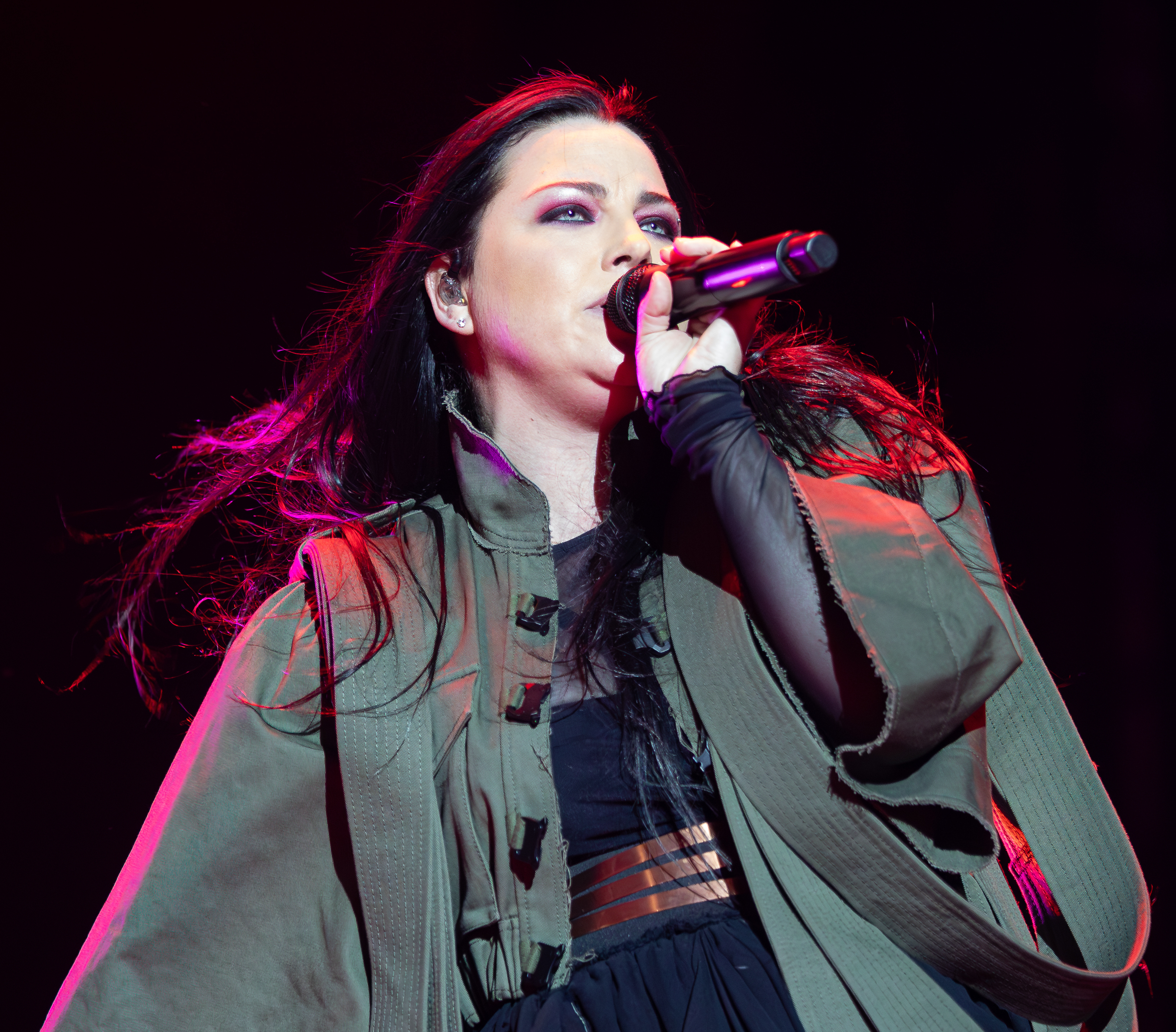
- Lee performing with Evanescence in 2023
- Born: Amy Lynn Lee; December 13, 1981 (age 44); Riverside, California, U.S.
- Occupations: Singer-songwriter; musician
- Spouse: Josh Hartzler (m. 2007)
- Children: 1
- Musical career
- Origin: Little Rock, Arkansas, U.S.
- Genres: Alternative metal; gothic metal; alternative rock; symphonic metal; nu metal
- Instruments: Vocals; keyboards
- Years active: 1994–present
- Labels: Wind-up; BMG
- Member of: Evanescence
- Website: amyleeofficial.com

Amy Lynn Lee (born December 13, 1981) is an American singer-songwriter and musician. She is the lead vocalist, keyboardist, lead songwriter, and co-founder of the rock band Evanescence. A classically trained pianist, Lee began writing music at age 11 and co-founded Evanescence at 13, inspired by various musical genres and film scores from an early age. Lee has participated in other musical projects, including Nightmare Revisited and Muppets: The Green Album, and composed music for several films, including War Story (2014), Indigo Grey: The Passage (2015), and the song "Speak to Me" for Voice from the Stone (2017). She has also released the covers EP Recover, Vol. 1 (2016), the soundtrack album to War Story, the children's album Dream Too Much (2016), and collaborated on songs with various artists including Korn, Seether, Bring Me the Horizon, Lindsey Stirling, Body Count, Wagakki Band, Halsey, Poppy, and Courtney LaPlante.

Alongside her awards and nominations with Evanescence, Lee's other accolades include the Songwriter Icon Award from the National Music Publishers Association (2008), Best Vocalist at the Revolver Golden Gods Awards (2012), Rock Goddess of the Year at Loudwire Music Awards (2012), Best Film Score by the Moondance International Film Festival for Indigo Grey: The Passage (2015), and the Hollywood Music in Media Award for Best Original Song in Independent Film for "Speak to Me" (2017). In 2012, VH1 named Lee one of the top 100 greatest women in music. Lee is the American chairperson for the international epilepsy awareness foundation Out of the Shadows, and in 2012 was honored with United Cerebral Palsy's Luella Bennack Award for her work.

== Early life and musical start ==
Amy Lee was born on December 13, 1981, in Riverside, California, to parents John Lee, who worked as a disc jockey and voice-over artist, and Sara Cargill. The oldest of five siblings, Lee has two living sisters. She had a younger sister who died at age three from an unidentified illness when Lee was six years old, and a younger brother who died in 2018 at age 24 after struggling with severe epilepsy for most of his life. Lee said that when her little sister died, her "whole perception of life changed", and it influenced her rumination on death. She wrote the songs "Hello" from Fallen and "Like You" from The Open Door for her late sister. After her sister's death, Lee did not allow herself "a lot of outward grief" to protect her parents' emotions. She spent time by herself creating, which became a self-soothing medium.

Lee discovered a passion for the piano in early childhood, wanting to play the instrument at age six after hearing her mother play. Classical music was her first musical influence as a child, inspiring her to become a musician and composer. She was first inspired by Mozart when she watched the 1984 film Amadeus at eight years old. Beethoven was another early classical inspiration, as well as Danny Elfman and Hans Zimmer's film scores. She wanted to take piano lessons, and studied classical piano for nine years. Lee considers the Lacrimosa movement of Mozart's Requiem her favorite piece of music, and wove it into The Open Door song "Lacrymosa".

Lee began writing poetry about eternity and loneliness at age 10. Her mother had expressed concern about her writing, suggesting she see a therapist. Lee thought about taking antidepressants at the time but chose not to as she felt it would take her "soul away" and she "wouldn't be able to feel anything." One of the first songs she remembered writing was an instrumental piece called "Eternity of the Remorse", writing the sheet music when she was 11. Her first song with lyrics was called "A Single Tear", which she wrote for an eighth-grade assignment, recording it on a cassette tape and playing guitar while her friend from choir did backup vocals.

During her pre-teen years, Lee's family moved to many places, including West Palm Beach, Florida, and Rockford, Illinois, eventually settling in Little Rock, Arkansas. When her family moved to Little Rock, Lee had a lot of pent-up "negativity". In Little Rock, she attended Pulaski Academy, a private college preparatory school, starting in junior high. She described the school as a "weird fit" for her, where she was a loner for a while, and experienced bullying for dressing differently, which she would later embrace during high school. Lee found solace in writing, and joining the school choir helped her slowly gain confidence in her voice. She was in the alto section of her choir. Lee was initially insecure as a singer, and only used singing as a vehicle for her writing. A self-described "choir nerd", she became president of her high school's choir, and wrote a choir piece called "Listen to the Rain", which the choir teacher liked and asked her to direct. The piece was performed by the choir in graduation.

Originally wanting to focus on classical or film score composing, Lee's plan changed as her "tastes got darker". In late childhood and throughout her teens, she listened to a variety of musical styles, including alternative music, grunge, hard rock, industrial music, death metal, groove metal, and electronica artists like Björk and Portishead. Lee's earliest memory of wanting to fuse various musical genres, especially contrasting styles, was when she was training in classical piano and noticed that a "real shreddy" section of a composition from Baroque composer Bach resembled heavy metal. She found "so many similarities to be drawn, almost more so the further out you go on both sides".

Lee's extra-curricular activities involved working on music, playing music with others from school, and freelance painting. She spent most of her free time making music at her house late at night. By age 13, Lee was inspired to form her own band, her musical vision for it being a fusion of her diverse musical tastes including cinematic and classical music, alternative, metal, and electronic music. In 1994, she met budding guitarist Ben Moody when she was 13 at a Christian youth camp; when others in the camp were playing sports, she played piano and he played acoustic guitar and she thought they could play music together. Lee thinks what drew them together at the time was that they "didn't fit in that well" and were "out of [their] element in this silly camp environment."

== Career ==
=== 1994–present: Evanescence ===
In 1994, Lee played Moody a cassette tape of her playing guitar and singing a song she wrote and the two began working on music at Lee's home. They were soon performing acoustic sets at bookstores and coffee houses in Little Rock and co-founded Evanescence. What made Lee want to start Evanescence was "the idea of combinations that were unlikely". Lee wanted to combine her various musical tastes, "bringing something from the cinematic and classical symphonic world and marrying it to metal, hard rock and alternative music." "There was all this music that was inspiring me. And Evanescence was the product of these two extremes combining". The duo independently recorded two EPs: Evanescence EP (1998) and Sound Asleep EP (1999). Their demos got them airplay on the local modern rock station in Little Rock and helped them develop a local fanbase. Although Lee and Moody performed live with guest musicians, Evanescence remained a duo. After graduating high school, Lee attended Middle Tennessee State University to study music theory and composition for film scoring, but left after a semester to solely focus on Evanescence. They packaged a demo CD, Origin (2000), to showcase to record labels.

Evanescence was signed by Wind Up Records in 2001, and moved to Los Angeles, where they completed their debut album, Fallen (2003). Most of Lee's writing on Fallen was driven by her mindset during a relationship she was in with an abusive man. Some of the songs on the album were composed by Lee and Moody when they were young teens, including three songs originally from their earlier independent records. Lee and Moody said they did not consider their music to be "goth" or nu metal. In October 2003, Moody left the band in the middle of the Fallen tour, citing "creative differences". Lee said it was a relief that he left because of tensions created within the band. "It was a really uncomfortable situation for everybody ... completely unstable and unhappy. ... I was afraid everything we worked for had the potential of going down the toilet." Tour guitarist John LeCompt commented in 2006 that Lee "gained authority as soon as Ben Moody walked out the door. They had an equal partnership, but he was the man, he had to strangle the band, all the life out of it". In Lee's termination letter to Evanescence's manager, she stated that Moody was physically and verbally abusive to her. With Moody gone, "a weight had been lifted".

Lee's creative disagreements with Moody included his strict approach to songwriting and focus on commerciality; he would "always be corralling" her ideas, and wanting to push the band in a more commercial, pop direction, and his influences were "a lot different" than hers. "A lot of the reason it's been so much fun writing [post-Moody] is that we're not thinking about that. It's like, 'What do we like? What's fun?'", and there is "no pressure of wanting to rule the world", Lee explained. In 2005, Moody conceded that they had different approaches: "[Amy] is much more creative than I am ... I am a bit more commercial minded ... she is more educated musically, and she wanted to explore that. ... I think in my immaturity at the time, I did that in just a way-too-controlling manner — it was like my way or the highway. We just couldn't meet in the middle, so I was like, 'The hell with it.'"

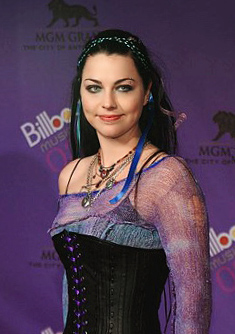
Amy Lee at the Billboard Music Awards (2003)

Lee called former Cold guitarist Terry Balsamo to replace Moody on the Fallen tour, and he soon became Evanescence's permanent lead guitarist and Lee's co-writing partner. She and Balsamo "clicked" and "connected on a lot of musical interests". During the tour, Lee wrote a song titled "The Last Song I'm Wasting on You", recording it in a bathroom on an analog recording device. When asked if the track was about Moody, Lee said, "If I answer that, then I'm not hiding anything anymore. But I just sort of answered it, didn't I?". She later deemed it "one of those personal, hard moments, when beauty is born out of pain".

After finishing the tour for Evanescence's live album and DVD Anywhere but Home (2004) and overwhelmed by label pressure, Lee retreated to her house, cut off contact with people, and spent the next 10 months writing music again, painting and going to therapy. She said of her first therapy sessions, "For the first, I don't know, lots of sessions, I'd just go in and cry. Every time. I guess I was letting out all the ghosts of my past." Lee found comfort in therapy, an environment where she felt she could speak freely and "not feel that anything I said was wrong". She referenced a session of interpreting recurring themes in her dreams, acknowledging a longstanding feeling of "always something looming under the surface", which she later overcame. During this time, Lee had invasive experiences with stalkers that forced her to leave her house a couple of nights. This experience led her to write the song "Snow White Queen" from her and a stalker's perspective. Other songs Lee wrote throughout these months included "Lacrymosa" and "Together Again".

Lee collaborated with Balsamo, co-writing music together for Evanescence's second album, The Open Door (2006). The writing experience for The Open Door was "the best process" Lee ever had because she had "free reign"[sic] and could "do whatever I wanted without being judged". In 2006, Lee said that when she listened back to Fallen, she "hear[d] all the vulnerability and the fear and all the childish things in me that are just human." While Lee was drowning in the misery of her experiences in Fallen, she said The Open Door is largely about her "purging the trials", acknowledging her issues and deliberating "what do I have to do to work this out", coming from a more hopeful place and with a more reflective outlook. Throughout the stages of making The Open Door, Lee had moved from California, rented a place in Florida, and eventually settled in New York. Following the album's tour cycle, Lee took a break to recollect herself and live life away from the industry.

After about 18 months, Lee began writing music again, and took harp lessons out of a desire to learn the instrument. In 2009, Evanescence began playing live shows again, with Lee realizing that she missed this part of her life, stating: "I had to get back together with all the guys, and we practiced all the old stuff ... and I enjoyed it so much. I started falling back in love with that part of me, the Evanescence part. I'd kind of been doing everything else, writing-wise, by myself, and I was like, 'Oh yeah, I love this stuff too. Maybe we should all make a record!'" Evanescence's third studio album, the self-titled Evanescence, was released in 2011. Lee said that the album's title was a reflection of it being "about the band"; unlike previous albums, the record was composed collaboratively as a band with all bandmembers contributing. Its lyrical themes include Lee "falling back in love" with Evanescence, her being inspired by nature and the ocean, brokenness, the quest for freedom, and falling in love. Different from The Open Door, which was "all about me and my personal experiences", Evanescence also includes Lee's musings on events that occurred to others in her life. "But really, whatever makes me feel the most, that's what's on the record, because that's what I need to get off my chest."

After the touring cycle for Evanescence, Lee took an extended break. In October 2013, Wind-up Records sold part of their catalog of artists, including Evanescence and their master recordings, to Bicycle Music Company. In January 2014, it was reported that Lee had filed a lawsuit against Wind-up Records for $1.5 million in unpaid royalties owed to the band. In March, Lee announced on her Twitter that she and Evanescence had been released from her Wind-up Records contract and she was now an independent artist; she stated: "Today, for the first time in 13 years, I am a free and independent artist. I have wanted this for so long and I am so happy", adding that this meant she was "free to do anything, Ev[anescence] included."

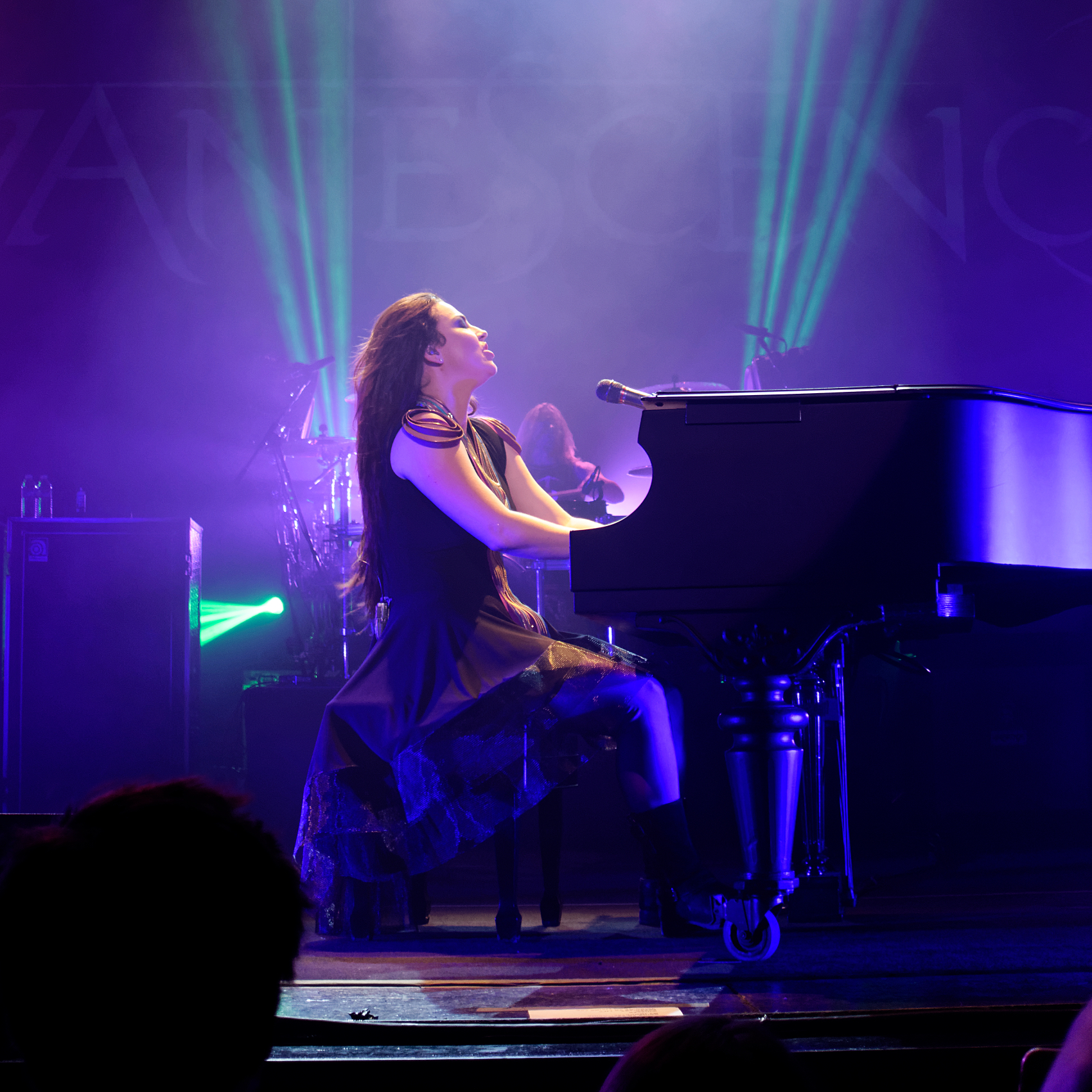
Amy Lee performing with Evanescence in 2015

Following several solo projects by Lee from 2014 to 2017, including film scoring, and Evanescence's resumed touring in 2015, the band worked on their fourth studio album, Synthesis, released in 2017. Synthesis is an album of orchestral and electronica re-recordings of the band's previous material in addition to two new songs and instrumentals. The album's release was followed by the Synthesis Live concert tour in which the band performed with a live orchestra for the first time.

In April 2020, Lee announced the release date of Evanescence's fifth album, The Bitter Truth. In a Q&A with Forbes in May 2020, Lee mentioned that the "image and idea" of the band from the early days was "something that combined multiple dramas, from the dramatic to the rock to the classical to the score", and that although many things have changed since, the "idea that started this whole thing is still there". Four songs from the album were released as singles throughout 2020 and 2021 during the COVID-19 pandemic, while a virtual live-streamed show was performed by the band from their recording base at Rock Falcon Studio, Nashville, in December 2020. The album was released on March 26, 2021.

The band's sixth studio album, Sanctuary, was released on June 5, 2026.

=== 2000–present: Solo work ===
==== 2000–2007: Early solo projects ====
Lee performed backup vocals for "Missing You", a song on Big Dismal's 2003 debut album Believe, and sang backup vocals on two songs with supergroup The Damning Well, though her vocals were taken off the final release due to record label issues. Lee later performed a duet with her then-boyfriend Shaun Morgan on the track "Broken" for Seether's 2004 album Disclaimer II. The song is in the soundtrack for the 2004 film The Punisher.

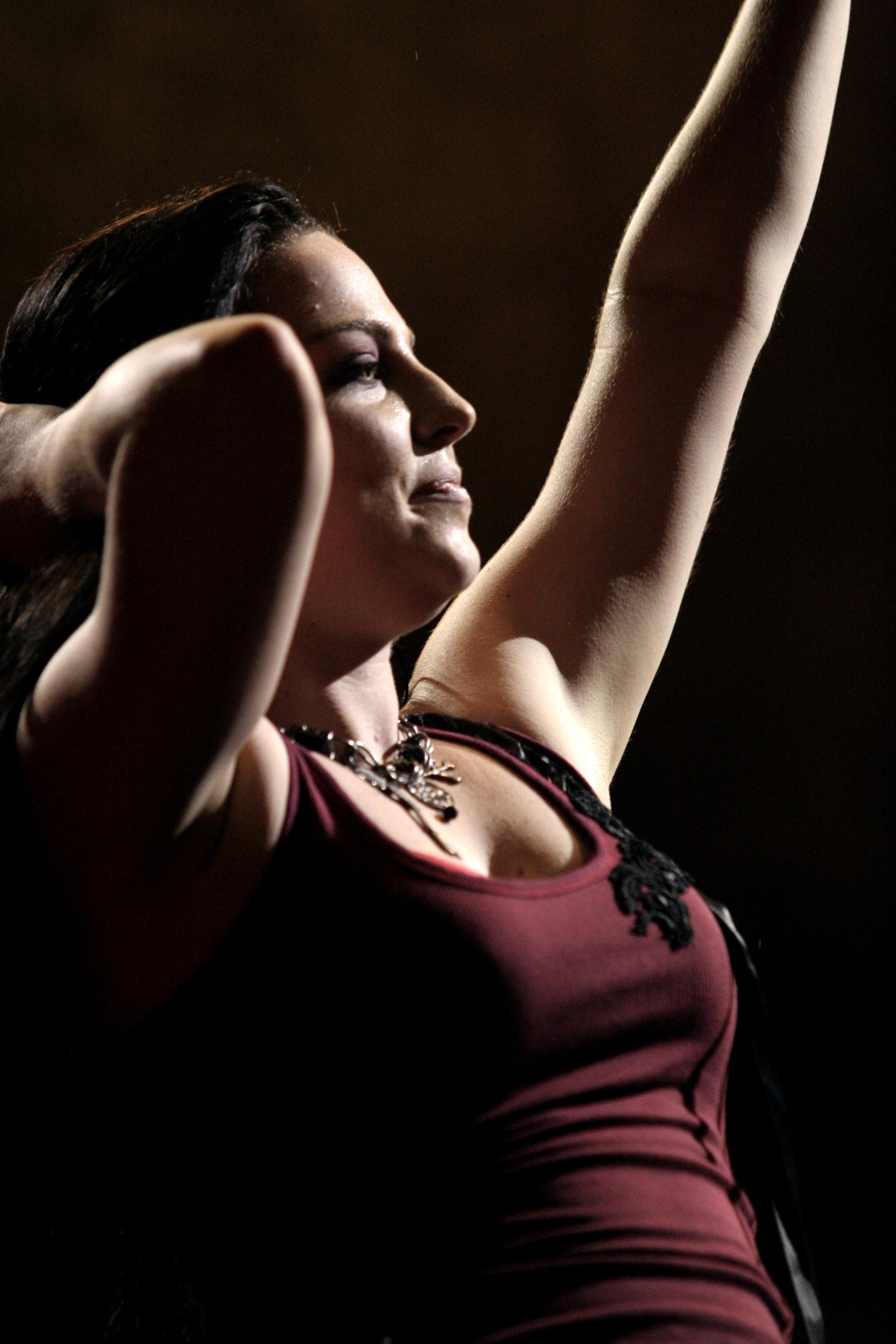
Lee in São Paulo, Brazil, in 2007

In 2004, Lee said she was working on music for The Chronicles of Narnia: The Lion, the Witch and the Wardrobe, but that the music was rejected by the studio for being "too dark". The producers of Narnia then stated that Evanescence music was never planned for the soundtrack. Lee said that she used part of the instrumental she wrote to segue into the last track of the album, "Good Enough".

Lee became the American chairperson for Out of the Shadows in 2006. This organization is an international foundation with the goal of providing education about epilepsy. Lee's younger brother, Robby, was previously diagnosed with this condition. The singer also made a brief guest appearance in the music video for Johnny Cash's "God's Gonna Cut You Down" in late 2006. As each celebrity featured in the shoot was allowed to choose what they would be doing for the video, Lee chose to appear laying flowers on a grave. Her scene was recorded at Trinity Church in Manhattan, during which she wore a black velvet coat that previously belonged to Tim Burton.

In February 2007, Lee performed with Korn on their song "Freak on a Leash" for MTV Unplugged: Korn. The song was also released as the first single from the album. In November 2007, VH1 produced a mockumentary in the style of Behind the Music, titled Rock Band Cometh: The Rock Band Band Story, to promote the video game Rock Band. She is one of the celebrity cameos featured on the show.

==== 2008–2012: Tribute albums ====
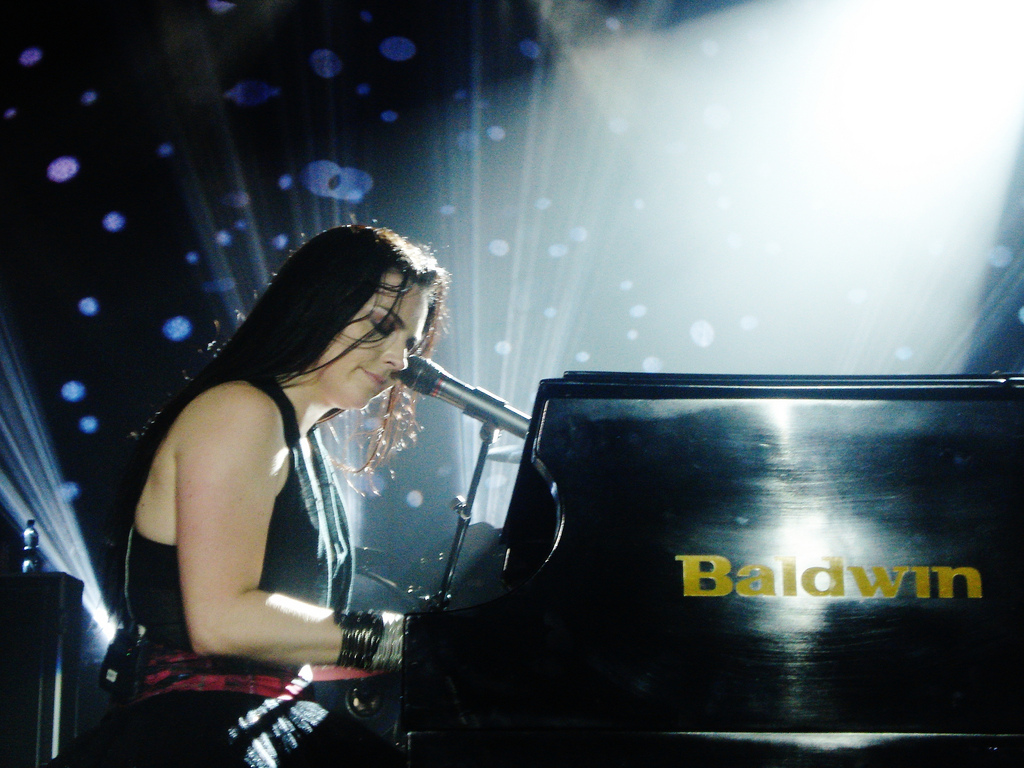
Lee performing during a concert in 2011

In June 2008, the National Music Publishers Association presented Lee with their 2008 Songwriter Icon Award, which "recognizes outstanding songwriters for their personal achievement".

For Walt Disney Records' September 2008 release of Nightmare Revisited, Lee covered "Sally's Song". The album contains new material and covers of songs from the original Nightmare Before Christmas soundtrack. Lee performed live renditions of "Sally's Song" during the October 17 Nightmare Before Christmas re-release premiere in Hollywood, and for an October 13 appearance on The Tonight Show with Jay Leno.

During an October 2008 interview for Spin.com, Lee noted that she was writing new songs, possibly for a solo album project. Citing influences in folk and Celtic music, she says her current writings feel like she is going back to her "really old" roots. She gave no potential release date, but said of her reason for this new direction, "I need to show that I'm more than a one trick pony."

Lee stated during an October 2008 interview with The Gauntlet that she did not know whether or not she would begin a solo career, saying that she was "at a point where I don't know what is next". She noted that Evanescence was still together as a band but that she found touring to be monotonous. She reiterated that she was continuing to write songs, although she did not yet know what purpose they would serve.

In a Spin interview in March 2010, Lee stated that she was "in a very different creative space then" regarding her previous work on new material, and that while she wrote some good songs, nothing from those efforts would be included in the band's album Evanescence, which was released on October 7, 2011.

In 2011, Lee covered "Halfway Down the Stairs" for Muppets: The Green Album and "I'm So Lonesome I Could Cry" for the tribute album We Walk the Line: A Celebration of the Music of Johnny Cash in 2012.

In 2012, Lee received United Cerebral Palsy's Luella Bennack Award. The organization stated:

The committee has selected Amy for this award for her commitment to bring attention to issues of education and personal dignity of people living with a disability by serving as the International spokesperson Out of the Shadows. Also, the message and integrity of Amy Lee's music has undeniably healed, inspired and transformed millions of women worldwide. Because of her personal pledge to making life more accessible and understood by everyone, we cannot conceive of a more interesting, motivated and deserving individual to honor on Luella's behalf.

==== 2013–2015: Aftermath and Recover ====
On December 2, 2013, it was announced that Lee had teamed up with American composer Dave Eggar to create music for the American drama film War Story. During an interview with MTV, Lee explained that it would be a "surprise" to her fans; the fact that the film was "dark" and lacking of conversations made it a "beautiful, sad platform for music". She added that for the music she blended various sounds and tones, mostly consisting of keyboard. Speaking about the song "Push the Button" which she originally penned for the movie, Lee explained that it marked a departure for her due to its electronic sound. She added, "I did it all myself, which was crazy, because I'm used to engineering and writing and mixing demos in my house, but being responsible for that being the end product was a new challenge for me." On August 6, Lee announced that the soundtrack album would be called Aftermath and that it would be released on August 25. Lee contributes to all ten tracks, which features Eggar on eight of them and American/Moroccan musician Malika Zarra on one. Lee revealed a 36-second teaser of the album on the same day. It is her first full-length solo album to not involve her band Evanescence.

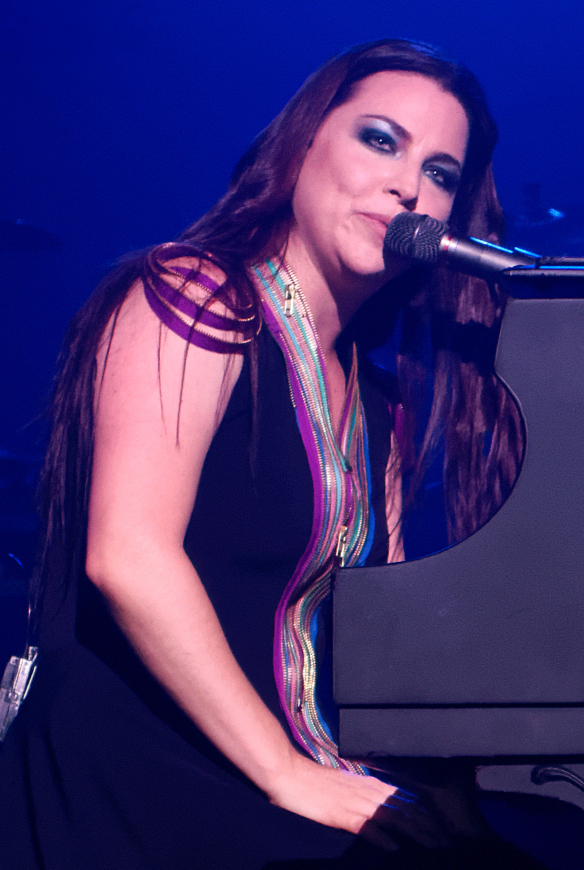
Lee in 2015

In March 2015, Lee and Eggar announced that they were recording music, along with Chuck Palmer, for Hammerstep's short film Indigo Grey: The Passage, which was released on September 14, 2015. The film features the songs "Between Worlds" and "Resurrection". Lee composed and recorded "Speak to Me", the title song to Eric D. Howell's 2017 film Voice from the Stone, during August 2015. The accompanying music video was also directed by Howell. It was filmed on October 22, 2015, on the Castle of Celsa estate near Siena, Italy. During a radio interview in July 2015, Lee said that she had been recording cover songs and expressed an interest in releasing them online. On October 27, 2015, she released the first song from the collection with Portishead's 1994 song "It's A Fire", followed by U2's 1987 song "With or Without You" on November 10, 2015, Led Zeppelin's 1971 song "Going to California" on December 1, 2015, and Chris Isaak's 1996 song "Baby Did a Bad, Bad Thing" on December 15, 2015. They are featured on Lee's debut extended play, Recover, Vol. 1, which was released on February 19, 2016. The cover songs are accompanied by music videos directed by Eric Ryan Anderson.

Lee confirmed in an interview with Rolling Stone that she is "definitely working and making music with every intention of people hearing it at this point," as of October 2015. She also stated that she does not have "any news or plans" for new Evanescence music, but assured fans on Twitter that the band has not broken up saying, "We don't follow the rules of a commerce-driven timeline. Inspiration drives us. We're wide open." She later stated during an interview with Loudwire that "there is Evanescence in the future". In December 2015, Lee confirmed that she plans to complete some songs from an Evanescence album (originally produced by Steve Lillywhite) that was rejected by Wind-up Records in 2010. She explained that she was "devastated" and "furious" over the rejection, but was determined to move forward and ended up being "angry enough to write Evanescence's heaviest album", titled Evanescence. Although three songs from the Lillywhite sessions ended up on it, Lee admitted, "I was still left feeling unsatisfied about what I lovingly refer to as my 'broken record'."

==== 2016–present: Dream Too Much and artist collaborations ====
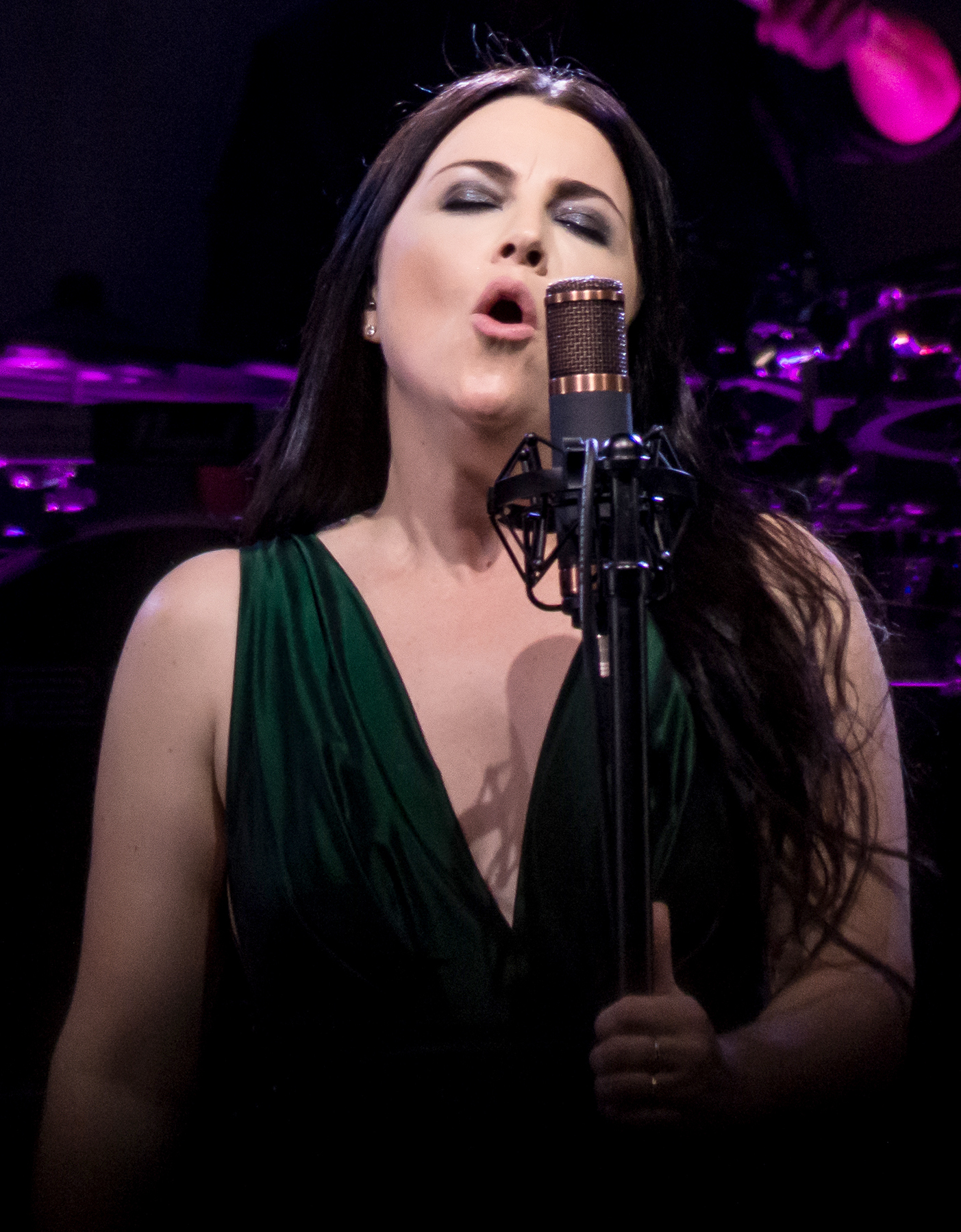
Amy Lee performing in October 2017

On June 17, 2016, Amazon.com announced that Lee was scheduled to release the "family" album Dream Too Much exclusively through Amazon Prime Music. It features "original music for kids and families" and was released on September 30, 2016. The album was a collaboration that involved her father, who is the lead vocalist on "Goodnight My Love", and her sisters.

On September 14, 2016, MTV News reported that Lee had worked on music for the film Blind, starring Alec Baldwin and Demi Moore. The film was premiered at the Woodstock Film Festival on October 13, 2016. On February 10, 2017, Lee released an English-language cover of Francesca Michielin's "L'amore esiste" ("Love Exists"), which she heard while working on a film project in Italy. With Guy Sigsworth as producer and Dave Eggar providing string arrangements, Lee recorded her translated and reinterpreted version of the song over the course of a week at Flux Studios in New York City. In March 2017, the song "Speak to Me" was made available on streaming platforms. It features as the end theme music for the film Voice from the Stone. In 2018, Lee collaborated with Veridia on their single, "I'll Never Be Ready", where she played piano. She stated that collaborating on the song helped her cope with the passing of her brother, Robby.

In 2019, Amy collaborated with Lindsey Stirling on Stirling's 2019 album Artemis on the track and in the music video for "Love Goes On And On".

Amy appeared on Body Count's song "When I'm Gone" off their seventh album Carnivore, which was released on March 6, 2020.

On July 31, 2020, American rock band Halestorm re-released their song "Break In", featuring Lee's vocals. The single was included on the Halestorm: Reimagined EP.

On September 19, 2020, Japanese rock band Wagakki Band released a song "Sakura Rising" featuring Lee. The song was written and recorded the day before their orchestral show in Osaka on February 16, 2020, where Lee performed as a guest, but it was finished through file sharing due to the coronavirus pandemic.

On October 30, 2020, Lee featured on the Bring Me the Horizon song "One Day The Only Butterflies Left Will Be In Your Chest As You March Towards Your Death" from their EP Post Human: Survival Horror.

Lee voiced a character in the 2023 film Metalocalypse: Army of the Doomstar.

In 2025, Lee and singer Halsey collaborated on the song "Hand That Feeds" for the action thriller film Ballerina. The track topped the Billboard Hot Rock & Alternative Songs chart prior to the film's release. For the same film, Evanescence performed "Fight Like A Girl" featuring K.Flay, which was used in the end credits of the film. That year, Lee also collaborated with singers Poppy and Courtney LaPlante for the song "End of You", produced by Jordan Fish and released on September 4, 2025.

== Artistry ==
=== Songwriting ===
Lee is a singer-songwriter and classically-trained pianist. As its main songwriter, Lee infused her love of sonic contrasts and various genres in Evanescence. She described her natural writing process as being "shut in" in isolation. She prefers the feeling of a "clean slate" before she starts writing music, not setting a plan and "going with the flow of inspiration". "An idea can come from anywhere—and oftentimes doesn't feel like I'm setting out to make some epic song." Writing primarily with keyboards and music software, Lee has also engineered, programmed, mixed, and produced music. When demoing, Lee would layer chord progressions and sound effects, including piano, electronic sounds and drum loops. A multi-instrumentalist, she plays and has written with other instruments such as organ, harp, and guitar. (Note: Other instruments:) She generally writes lyrics last, working on music and sounds first before completing melodic ideas and realizing what she feels inspired to write about; often a mood she develops sonically informs her lyrically. Lee said that she rarely starts writing with a specific intention, and discerns what she wants to express after stream of consciousness writing, which she later hones in on lyrically.

Lee regarded the process of creation and expressing herself through the arts as emancipation for herself, a cathartic outlet through which she could pour various emotions and process difficult experiences. For her, writing has to come from an honest place and an internal need to create. Her experience with death and grief as child influenced her perspective and creative work, including her music, lyrics, and drawings. "I spent a lot of time being creative by myself because I was trying to express something that I couldn't say ... trying to paint a picture of the inside". Later in her teen years, her struggle with abuse she experienced also informed much of her writing. She attributed the dramatic sounds she developed in Evanescence to her desire to channel her biggest emotions through music. In 2007, she stated that it was recently that she could start drawing "from all emotions to make music, not just the painful ones." Lee did not view her music and lyrics as morose, stating that, while some of her experiences reflected such emotions in the music, it came "from the perspective of somebody who wants to live, wants to be happy and wants to love life".

Lee often writes songs that relate to several things, remarking that her feelings are "complicated, all the time. It's never just one thing. Hardly ever, do I just feel happy or just feel sad. It's always a weird combination of things that make no sense, and that's how I write my music." Her thematic inspirations largely come from "an internal place ... perception and reactions to the events of my life but also to the outside world." Some of her writing has been inspired by her "vivid" dreams, and the idea of life after death. Some lyrics are also her talking to herself while trying to navigate situations. Lee is also lyrically inspired by stories of courage, people overcoming struggles and "stepping forward after they’ve been through something major." Over time, Lee became more outspoken in her lyrics. Topics she has written about in Evanescence include: loss, abuse, fears, numbness, harassment, solitude, artifice, relationship dynamic, sorrow, relationship with music, aimlessness, contentment, mental health, defiance, indulgence, longing, nature, dreams, the music industry, identity, autonomy, disillusionment, speaking up, social issues, illusions, spiritual uncertainty, perseverance, and solidarity.

=== Voice ===
Lee sings in a mezzo-soprano register. The Boston Globe has described her voice as an "ethereal soprano" in a review of "Going Under", highlighting her ability to move with power and brightness through upper registers.

=== Musical influences ===
Lee has cited influence from composers such as Mozart, Danny Elfman, and Hans Zimmer, and artists like Björk, Portishead, Massive Attack, Korn, Nine Inch Nails, Tori Amos, Radiohead, Shirley Manson and Garbage, Nirvana, Soundgarden, Pantera, Depeche Mode, Rob Zombie, White Zombie, The Smashing Pumpkins, Pearl Jam, Metallica, Joan Jett, and A Perfect Circle.

=== Style and imagery ===
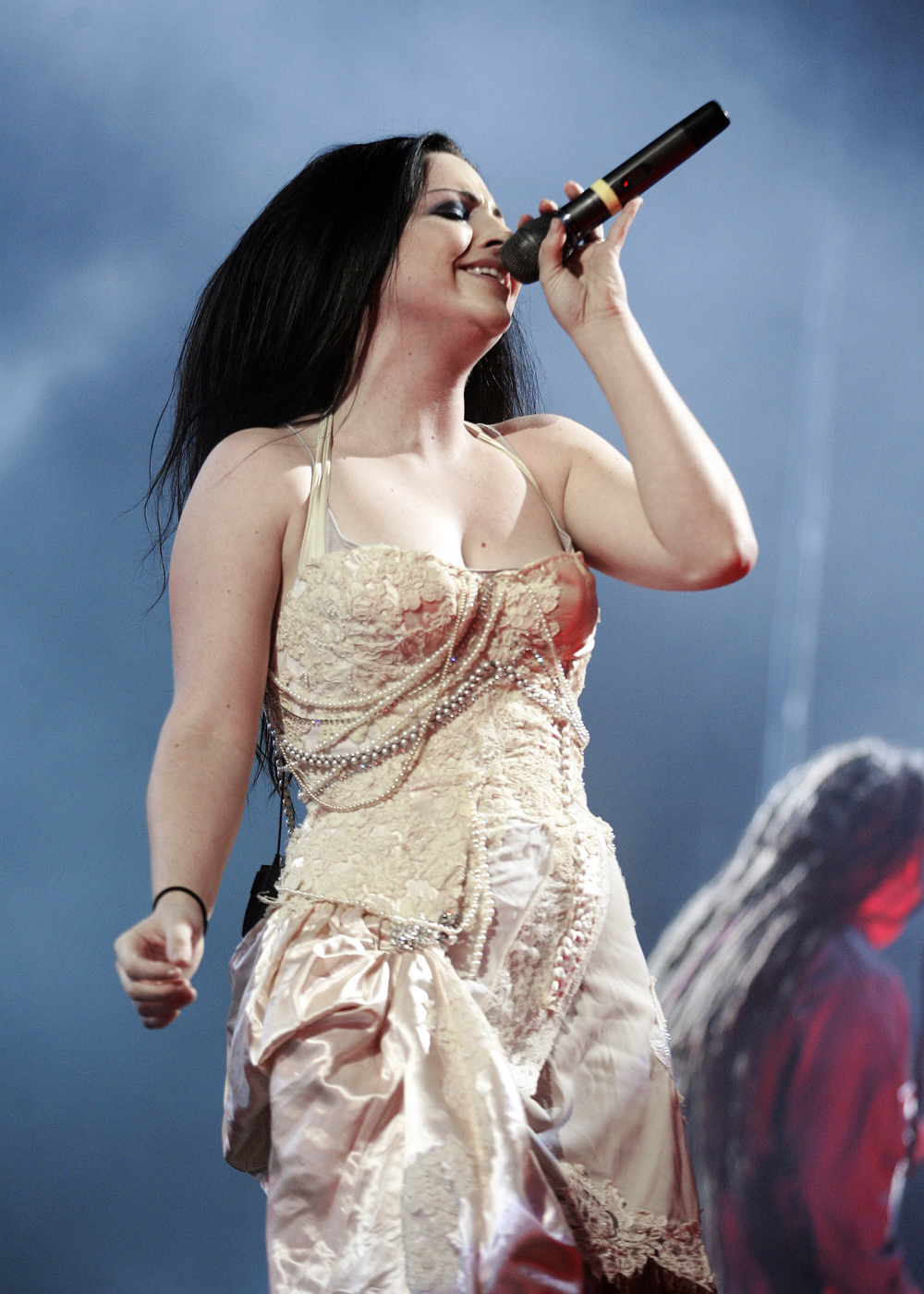
Lee performing in Miami, Florida, in 2007

Lee has a recognizable fashion style, marked by her taste for Victorian-styled clothing and occasional use of gothic make-up. She has been labelled a "gothic rock superstar" and a "style icon". Her image was described as "independent and self-assured".

Lee designs many of her own clothes, including those worn in the music video for "Going Under", the dress worn for the cover of The Open Door and the dress she wore to the Nobel Peace Prize Concert in 2011. After she designed the dress she wore at the 2004 Grammy Awards, she chose Japanese designer H. Naoto to make it for her. In 2003, Lee said she wears "lots of funky stuff onstage", and likes to "mix it up" with "two basic elements ... rock, metal and chains and stuff, mixed with fairies and Victorian clothing, fantasy".

Lee explained and showcased some of her wardrobes in 2011, commenting that she would rather make her own clothes because it is hard to find exactly what she wants elsewhere. She likes "asymmetrical things" and "a little bit of chaos" in her outfits, and "when it comes to the band, I want to dress to fit the music." Lee said she used to wear corsets more often in the early years when she wasn't as confident on stage, and it wasn't about "goth" but more about making her feel like "you're about to ride a rollercoaster and you're strapped in and not going to fall out."

Lee also guided Evanescence imagery since its start, including the title theme, videos, and album artwork.

In 2006, Blender listed Lee as one of the hottest women in rock alongside such singers as Joan Jett, Courtney Love and Liz Phair. In 2013, Lee ranked first in NME.com's "Hottest Women in Music" award.

== Personal life ==
Lee was in a relationship with Seether's singer Shaun Morgan from 2003 to 2005. In May 2007, Lee married therapist Josh Hartzler. The couple's child, a son, was born in July 2014.

Lee said that she has never been formally religious but considers herself a Christian. She said that Evanescence was not a Christian band and did not have any religious affiliation.

Lee has spoken about mental health and stated that she has experienced anxiety and depression from an early age. She considered her creative process to be a self-soothing activity.

== Discography ==
- Aftermath (2014)
- Recover, Vol. 1 (2016)
- Dream Too Much (2016)

== Filmography ==
- I Love the New Millennium (herself)
- VH1's 100 Greatest Hard Rock Songs (herself)
- Metalocalypse: Army of the Doomstar (voice)

== Awards and nominations ==
Year	Award	Category	Nominated work	Result	Ref
2007	Kerrang! Awards	Sexiest Female	Amy Lee	Won	
2008	National Music Publishers Association	Songwriter Icon Award	Amy Lee	Won	
2011	Revolver	Hottest Chicks in Hard Rock	Amy Lee	Won	
2011	Loudwire Music Awards	Rock Goddess of the Year	Amy Lee	Nominated	
2012	United Cerebral Palsy	Luella Bennack Award	Amy Lee	Won	
2012	VH1	Top 100 Greatest Women in Music	Amy Lee	#49	
2012	Revolver Golden Gods Award	Best Vocalist	Amy Lee	Won	
2012	Kerrang! Awards	Hottest Female	Amy Lee	Nominated	
2012	Loudwire Music Awards	Rock Goddess of the Year	Amy Lee	Won	
2013	NME Awards	Hottest Woman	Amy Lee	Won	
2015	Independent Music Awards	World Beat Song	"Dark Water" (feat. Malika Zarra)	Won	
2015	Moondance International Film Festival	Film Score	Indigo Grey: The Passage	Won	
2016	Family Choice Awards	Children's album	Dream Too Much	Won	
2017	Parents' Choice Award	Silver Honor in Music	Dream Too Much	Won	
2017	Hollywood Music in Media Awards	Original Song - Independent Film	"Speak to Me" (with Michael Wandmacher)	Won	
2021	She Rocks Awards	Powerhouse Award	Amy Lee	Won	
2025	Revolver Awards	Song of the Year	"End of You" (with Poppy and Courtney LaPlante)	Won	
2027	Grammy Awards	Best Metal Performance	"End of You" (with Poppy and Courtney LaPlante)	Pending	
