= Voice from the Stone =

2017 film by Eric D. Howell

- Release poster
- Directed by: Eric D. Howell
- Screenplay by: Andrew Shaw
- Based on: Voice from the Stone by Silvio Raffo
- Produced by: Dean Zanuck; Stefano Gallini-Durante
- Starring: Emilia Clarke; Marton Csokas; Caterina Murino; Remo Girone; Lisa Gastoni; Edward George Dring
- Cinematography: Peter Simonite
- Edited by: Clayton Condit
- Music by: Michael Wandmacher
- Production companies: Zanuck Independent; Code 39 Films
- Distributed by: Momentum Pictures
- Release dates: April 20, 2017 (MSPIFF); April 28, 2017 (United States)
- Running time: 87 minutes
- Country: United States
- Language: English
- Box office: $87,273

Voice from the Stone is a 2017 American supernatural gothic psychological horror film directed by Eric D. Howell from a screenplay by Andrew Shaw, based on the 1996 novel of the same name by Silvio Raffo. It stars Emilia Clarke, Marton Csokas, Caterina Murino, Remo Girone, Lisa Gastoni and Edward George Dring. Shot in Italy, the film follows a young patient of a female psychologist, who gave a promise to the dying mother to remain silent, until her spirit returns.

The film had its world premiere at the Minneapolis–Saint Paul International Film Festival on April 20, 2017. It was released in the United States in select theaters and on video on demand and digital HD on April 28, 2017, by Momentum Pictures.

== Plot ==
In post-World War II Italy, Malvina is on her deathbed at her ancestral home. She tells Jakob, her adolescent son, that another woman will come, a woman who will love him, and that the next words he speaks will call Malvina back to him.

Seven months later a British nurse specializing in children’s care, Verena, arrives. Jakob hasn't spoken since his mother died and Verena is the latest English-speaking (per Malvina's wishes) nurse recruited by Klaus, Jakob's father. Verena meets estate keeper Alessio and retired house maid Lilia. Though polite, Jakob is cold and distant.

Verena learns that Malvina's family owned the estate and surrounding quarries for 1,200 years. Malvina was the first descendant not to run the quarry, instead becoming a world famous pianist. Since most of the men who worked there died during the second world war, she allowed the quarry to flood, though Alessio still lights a flame for long-dead quarrymen, proclaiming "Life. Death. Love. The stone was everything."

When Verena looks in on Jakob one night, she finds him with his ear to the stone wall in his room, listening. Klaus fears that Jakob believes he can hear Malvina in the stone. Verena worries that she is inadequate and that Jakob's condition requires a mental health specialist.

When Verena sees Jakob on the ledge of a tall tower, she endangers herself to rescue him – making her (and Jakob) realize that she cares for him and must stay to help him. She caringly explains that the voice he hears is real, but that it is just his mind playing tricks on him. The next day Verena sees him listening to Malvina's tombstone in the family mausoleum. Alessio informs her that 40 generations are buried there "in the stone". Verena, who was orphaned around Jakob's age, tells the boy that she already knows that wishing to hear dead loved ones does not make it happen.

Verena, who cannot play piano, encourages the gifted Jakob to do so, as he has refused to play since Malvina died. Lilia, a confidant to Malvina, develops a close relationship with Verena. Lilia visits her room most evenings to talk about Jakob, and Malvina, and Verena's disconnected life of helping, then having to leave, a series of children.

Verena becomes more attached to the stone, listening to walls, the quarry and even Malvina's tomb. She tears her skirt one day and Lilia gives her a dress of Malvina's. This initially angers Klaus, but upon seeing Verena in a state of undress, he notices the striking physical similarity between Verena and his wife. Klaus has stalled on making a sculpture of Malvina, and Verena agrees to model nude so the statue can be completed. Verena starts dreaming about sleeping with Klaus.

Verena catches Jakob listening to the stone wall in Malvina's near empty bedroom. She joins him and hears Malvina's voice, confirming that her spirit is living in the stone. Verena speaks to a picture of Malvina, promising to care for both Jakob and Klaus. She sleeps with Klaus after he finishes his work on the statue, and Jakob becomes friendlier towards her, though still remaining silent.

Klaus feels guilty and decides to fire her since Jakob still isn't speaking. Distraught, and suffering from the same fever Malvina had, Verena pleads with Jakob to speak so that she will not be sent away. When she does leave, Klaus suddenly begs her to stay in his and Jakob's lives. She wants to ask Lilia's advice, only to learn that Lilia committed suicide on the day of Malvina's death. As she flees the house she collapses and is carried to Malvina's bedroom.

In her fevered state, she has numerous hallucinations. She sees Lilia, then sees Alessio entombing her with Malvina, who runs her hand over Verena's face. Verena wakes up on the bed, seemingly recovered. Klaus takes her to see Jakob. Jakob goes to Verena, embraces her and says "I miss my mama", to which Verena replies, "I'm here, I'm right here". Jakob smiles and runs to his father. "Verena", who now wears Malvina's signature ring and plays the piano flawlessly, says that "I hardly know the woman I see. We are, none of us, quite who we were." Alessio is pleased to see that "Malvina" is back, restoring the happy family.

== Cast ==
- Emilia Clarke as Verena
- Marton Csokas as Klaus Rivi
- Caterina Murino as Malvina Rivi
- Remo Girone as Alessio
- Lisa Gastoni as Lilia
- Edward George Dring as Jakob Rivi

== Production ==
Principal photography on the film began in Italy in November 2014, and concluded on December 23, 2014. The film was shot on location in Tuscany, Lazio, and at Cinecittà studios in Rome.

In August 2015, it was revealed that Evanescence singer Amy Lee would be composing and singing the song for the closing credits of the film. The song, titled "Speak to Me", was recorded at California's Skywalker Ranch, and was released on March 17, 2017. Lee filmed a video to accompany it with the Voice from the Stone crew on location in Tuscany.

== Reception ==
On the review aggregator website Rotten Tomatoes, the film holds an approval rating of 38% based on 24 reviews, with an average rating of 5.5/10. The website's critics consensus reads, "Voice from the Stone strands some solid performances in a would-be thriller distinctly devoid of spine-tingling moments." On Metacritic, which assigns a weighted average score out of 100 to reviews from mainstream critics, the film received an average score of 42, based on reviews from 7 critics, indicating "mixed or average" reviews.
