= We Walk the Line: A Celebration of the Music of Johnny Cash =

We Walk The Line: A Celebration of the Music of Johnny Cash

Live album by Various artists
- Released: August 7, 2012
- Recorded: April 20, 2012
- Genre: Country, folk rock
- Length: 64:12 (CD); 77:33 (DVD)
- Label: Legacy Records
- Director: Conor McAnally
- Producer: Keith Wortman

We Walk The Line: A Celebration of the Music of Johnny Cash is a live tribute album to country musician, Johnny Cash. The album features various interpretations of Cash's hits and songs he had covered on his American Recordings albums. The concert presented artists from a wide variety of genres and were backed by an all-star band led by Grammy Award-winning producer and musical director Don Was, country songwriter and musician Buddy Miller, drummer Kenny Aronoff, keyboardist Ian McLagan, and multi-instrumentalist Greg Leisz. The profits from the ticket sales and album release will benefit "Charley's Fund", a non-profit organization that works to find a cure for the fatal childhood disease Duchenne muscular dystrophy.

== Track listing ==
No.	Title	Writer(s)	Artist(s)	Length
1.	"Folsom Prison Blues"	J. Cash	Brandi Carlile	3:52
2.	"Ring of Fire"	J. Carter, M. Kilgore	Ronnie Dunn	3:15
3.	"Hey Porter"	J. Cash	Buddy Miller	3:07
4.	"Hurt"	T. Reznor	Lucinda Williams	4:00
5.	"Wreck of the Old 97"	B. Johnson, N. Blake	Rhett Miller	2:36
6.	"Jackson"	G. Rodgers, B. Wheeler	Carolina Chocolate Drops	3:31
7.	"The Long Black Veil"	M. Wilkin, D. Dill	Iron & Wine	2:53
8.	"Big River"	J. Cash	Kris Kristofferson	2:31
9.	"Why Me Lord"	K. Kristofferson	Shelby Lynne	3:10
10.	"Help Me Make It Through the Night"	K. Kristofferson	Pat Monahan	3:51
11.	"It Ain't Me Babe"	B. Dylan	Shelby Lynne and Pat Monahan	3:46
12.	"Sunday Morning Coming Down"	K. Kristofferson	Kris Kristofferson and Jamey Johnson	4:42
13.	"Get Rhythm"	J. Cash	Andy Grammer	2:50
14.	"Cocaine Blues"	T. J. Arnall	Shooter Jennings and Amy Nelson	2:43
15.	"I'm So Lonesome I Could Cry"	H. Williams	Amy Lee	3:15
16.	"Cry, Cry, Cry"	J. Cash	Sheryl Crow	2:42
17.	"I Still Miss Someone"	J. Cash, R. Cash, Jr.	Willie Nelson	2:45
18.	"If I Were a Carpenter"	T. Hardin	Sheryl Crow and Willie Nelson	3:07
19.	"Highwayman"	J. Webb	Willie Nelson, Kris Kristofferson, Shooter Jennings, and Jamey Johnson	3:07
20.	"I Walk the Line"	J. Cash	Full Ensemble	2:29

Note: The songs are credited as they appear in the liner notes.

== DVD sequencing and features ==
The concert itself is sequenced differently than the album and features band and song introductions by Matthew McConaughey.

Bonus features include a rehearsal performance of "I Still Miss Someone" by Willie Nelson, a performance of "The Man Comes Around" by McConaughey, a featurette titled "Johnny Cash, His Life and Music" (featuring interviews from the ensemble), and "Walk the Line: The Making of a Celebration", a behind the scenes look on how the concert was conceived.

== Chart performance ==
Chart (2012)	Peak position
US Billboard 200	200
US Billboard Top Country Albums	38
