= Recover, Vol. 1 =

EP by Amy Lee
- Released: February 19, 2016
- Recorded: 2015
- Genre: Rock
- Length: 13:53
- Label: Self-released
- Producer: Amy Lee; Steve Lillywhite; Will B. Hunt

Amy Lee chronology
Aftermath (2014)	Recover, Vol. 1 (2016)	Dream Too Much (2016)

Recover, Vol. 1 is an extended play by Amy Lee, released on February 19, 2016. It features four cover songs performed by Lee.

== Background ==
During a radio interview in July 2015, Lee said that she had been recording cover songs and expressed an interest in releasing them online. On October 27, 2015, she released the first song from the collection with Portishead's 1994 song "It's a Fire", followed by U2's 1987 song "With or Without You" on November 10, 2015, Led Zeppelin's 1971 song "Going to California" on December 1, 2015, and Chris Isaak's 1996 song "Baby Did a Bad Bad Thing" on December 15, 2015. They are compiled on Recover, Vol. 1. The cover songs are accompanied by music videos directed by Eric Ryan Anderson. Lee released a statement about the EP on her official Facebook profile, writing,

"Making these covers has been a really satisfying outlet for me lately. I get to play with music I already love and know so well, and instead of just singing my own parts over the speakers (like I've done for years with some of these!), I'm getting inside it. You asked for it, so I'm putting the first 4 on an EP for sale on iTunes".

== Track listing ==
No.	Title	Writer(s)	Producer(s)	Length
1.	"It's a Fire" (Portishead cover)	Geoff Barrow; Beth Gibbons; Adrian Utley		3:38
2.	"With or Without You" (U2 cover)	Bono; The Edge; Larry Mullen Jr.; Adam Clayton		4:08
3.	"Going to California" (Led Zeppelin cover)	Jimmy Page; Robert Plant		3:23
4.	"Baby Did a Bad Bad Thing" (Chris Isaak cover)	Chris Isaak	Amy Lee; Steve Lillywhite; Will B. Hunt	2:44
