= Dream Too Much =

Studio album by Amy Lee
- Released: September 30, 2016
- Recorded: 2016
- Studio: Spaceway Productions
- Genre: Children's music
- Length: 27:31
- Label: Amazon
- Producer: Will Hunt

Amy Lee chronology
Recover, Vol. 1 (2016)	Dream Too Much (2016)

Dream Too Much is a children's album by Amy Lee, lead singer of the American rock band Evanescence. The album was written with multiple members of her immediate family, and was released through Amazon Prime on September 30, 2016. Videos for each song were released via Amazon Video, with the animated music video for "Dream Too Much" being inspired by her two-year-old son.

== Background ==
Lee revealed that she had initially thought that she would not have enough time to work on music as a mother, but noticed that motherhood gave her "a showering of inspiration and fuel". Thus, Lee revealed that except for the everyday errands, she still had time to be creative and record music for Dream Too Much. Lee said the album was going to feature only four or five songs as a sixtieth birthday present for her father, John Lee. However, her manager was approached by Amazon to do a full children's album, and she accepted it.

Aside from the original songs written for the album, Lee also covered Ben King's "Stand By Me" (1961) and "Hello, Goodbye" (1967) by the Beatles. A writer with Loudwire noted the broader reach of these songs which could appeal to adult listeners as well.

== Track listing ==
No.	Title	Writer(s)	Length
1.	"Stand by Me"	Ben E. King; Jerry Leiber; Mike Stoller	2:18
2.	"Dream Too Much"	Amy Lee; Lori Lee	3:05
3.	"Bee and Duck"	A. Lee	0:36
4.	"I'm Not Tired"	A. Lee; L. Lee	2:15
5.	"Little Bird"	A. Lee; John Lee	3:23
6.	"Alice"	A. Lee	0:47
7.	"Rubber Duckie"	Jeff Moss	2:08
8.	"Hello, Goodbye"	John Lennon; Paul McCartney	2:59
9.	"Donkey and Chicken"	A. Lee	1:23
10.	"The End of the Book"	A. Lee; L. Lee; J. Lee; Josh Hartzler	2:58
11.	"If You're a Star"	A. Lee; J. Lee; Hartzler	2:56
12.	"Goodnight My Love"	George Motola; John Marascalco	2:43
Total length:			27:31
