= War Story (2014 film) =

- Film poster
- Directed by: Mark Jackson
- Written by: Mark Jackson; Kristin Gore
- Produced by: Catherine Keener; Kristin Gore; Matt Ratner; Shona Tuckman
- Starring: Catherine Keener; Ben Kingsley; Hafsia Herzi
- Cinematography: Reed Morano
- Edited by: Kate Abernathy
- Music by: Amy Lee; Dave Eggar; Chuck Palmer
- Production companies: Caney Fork Films; Kreate Films; Sicily Movie; Tilted Windmill Productions
- Release date: January 19, 2014 (Sundance)
- Running time: 90 minutes
- Country: United States
- Language: English

War Story is a 2014 American drama film directed by Mark Jackson from a screenplay by Jackson and Kristin Gore. It stars Catherine Keener, Hafsia Herzi and Ben Kingsley. The film had its world premiere at 2014 Sundance Film Festival on January 19, 2014, and later screened at 2014 International Film Festival Rotterdam. Its music was composed by Amy Lee, Dave Eggar, and Chuck Palmer.

== Premise ==
A war photographer, Lee goes to Sicily instead of going back home to New York City, to forget about being taken hostage in Libya. In Sicily, she crosses paths with her former lover and mentor Albert and tries to help Hafsia, a young Tunisian migrant, escape to France.

== Cast ==
- Catherine Keener as Lee
- Hafsia Herzi as Hafsia
- Ben Kingsley as Albert
- Donatella Finocchiaro as Daria
- Vincenzo Amato as Filippo

== Music ==
Music for the film was composed by Amy Lee of rock band Evanescence, and Dave Eggar. The soundtrack album was released on August 25, 2014.

== Reception ==
War Story received a mixed to negative response from critics, with a 47% rating on rotten tomatoes. Todd McCarthy in his review for The Hollywood Reporter praised the film, calling it "A compelling, beautifully filmed character study of a war zone photographer in personal turmoil." Mark Adams of Screen International praised the film by saying that it is "A dense and taut drama, a study on post-traumatic stress disorder that at its best is strikingly tense and heavy with sadness." Chris Michael in his review for The Guardian, gave the film three out of five stars and said that "Catherine Keener exudes dark anxiety in Mark Jackson's tale of the European immigrant experience." Metacritic, which uses a weighted average, assigned the film a score of 50 out of 100, based on 13 critics, indicating "mixed or average" reviews.

== Accolades ==
Year	Award	Category	Recipient	Result
2014	International Film Festival Rotterdam	Tiger Award	Mark Jackson	Nominated
