= Aftermath (Amy Lee soundtrack) =

Soundtrack album by Amy Lee
- Released: August 25, 2014
- Recorded: 2013–2014
- Length: 29:47
- Label: Self-released
- Producer: Amy Lee; Dave Eggar; Chuck Palmer; Johnny Nice

Amy Lee chronology
Aftermath (2014)	Recover, Vol. 1 (2016)

Aftermath is the soundtrack album for Mark Jackson's drama film War Story. It contains music from and inspired by the film, composed, produced and mixed by keyboardist Amy Lee, cellist Dave Eggar and drummer Chuck Palmer. Aftermath was independently released by Lee on August 25, 2014. It is Lee's first studio album release as a solo artist.

== Background ==
Lee and Eggar were acquaintances of film director Mark Johnson, who informed them the feelings he wanted musically expressed for the characters. Lee said that "probably half of the music isn’t in the film, we’re just working in this big, black open playing field."

A song with world music elements was requested for the film, and Dave Eggar suggested Moroccan singer Malika Zarra to sing the song. Lee wrote the lyrics in English and worked with Zarra, who used them to sing in Arabic, and then worked on the melodies, arrangement, mixing and production in her studio, building the framework of the song. Lee layered her vocals on it, Palmer added the drum loop, and other musicians played the oud and hammer dulcimer. The song, "Dark Water", was not used in the film, and Lee included it in the soundtrack album.

In a January 2014 interview with MTV News, Lee stated that the material has "a lot of blending of sounds, a lot of ominous tones. I play a lot of keyboard, and a lot of Taurus pedal. There's a lot of low drones." Apart from melodic playing, she and Eggar also "built walls of sounds, out of blaring cellos and trombones and synthesizers and harp, all on top of each other" that are atmospheric. Lee also wrote the electronic song "Push the Button" for Jackson, who was looking for a song for a specific scene that was sonically different from the rest of the score. The song was mixed and produced by Lee.

Lee announced the project on her Twitter account in December 2013.

== Critical reception ==
Professional ratings
Review scores
Source	Rating
Kerrang!	KKKK
Dead Press!	7/10 stars

George Garner of Kerrang! praised Lee's efforts for edging away from the heaviness of Evanescence. He described the album as containing all minimalist pianos and eerie strings, and that it was the best representation of Lee's voice and talent to date.

== Track listing ==
No.	Title	Writer(s)	Producer(s)	Length
1.	"Push the Button"	Amy Lee	Lee	3:13
2.	"White Out"	Dave Eggar; Chuck Palmer	Palmer; Eggar	1:29
3.	"Remember to Breathe"	Eggar	Lee	1:24
4.	"Dark Water" (featuring Malika Zarra)	Lee; Eggar; Palmer	Lee; Eggar; Palmer; Johnny Nice	3:29
5.	"Between Worlds"	Eggar; Lee; Palmer	Lee; Palmer	3:35
6.	"Drifter"	Lee; Eggar	Lee	1:55
7.	"Can't Stop What's Coming"	Lee; Palmer; Eggar	Palmer; Lee	2:04
8.	"Voice in My Head"	Lee; Eggar	Lee; Eggar; Palmer	3:47
9.	"Lockdown"	Lee; Palmer	Lee; Eggar; Palmer	4:58
10.	"After"	Eggar; Palmer	Palmer	3:53

== Credits and personnel ==
Credits are taken from the album's liner notes and War Story's film credits.

- Amy Lee – vocals, keyboards, programming, producer, mixing, lyrics
- Dave Eggar – cello, producer, mixing
- Chuck Palmer – drums, programming, producer, mixing
- Johnny Nice – performer, producer
- Malika Zarra – vocals
- Joel Hoekstra – guitar
- Amanda Ruzza – bass
- Thad DeBrock – performer
- Ramona Lawla – performer
- Kenia Mattis – performer
- Dave Nelson – performer
- Luke Notary – performer
- Donnie Reis – performer
- Max ZT – performer
- Brandon Terzig – performer
- Brendan Muldowney – mixing
- Pete Doell – mastering
- Dan Mandell – art direction, designer

== Charts ==
Chart (2014)	Peak position
Belgian Albums (Ultratop Flanders)	153
Belgian Albums (Ultratop Wallonia)	132
Dutch Albums (Album Top 100)	92
Italian Albums (FIMI)	49
UK Albums (OCC)	67
UK Indie Chart (OCC)	18
UK Indie Breakers Chart (OCC)	2
US Billboard 200	47
US Top Rock Albums (Billboard)	15
US Top Soundtracks (Billboard)	3
