= Michael Wandmacher =

American composer (born 1967)

- Also known as: Khursor
- Born: October 29, 1967 (age 59); Minneapolis, Minnesota, U.S.
- Genres: Film score; rock
- Occupations: Composer, arranger, producer, musician
- Instruments: Guitar, synthesizer

Michael Wandmacher (born October 29, 1967) is an American composer of film, television, and video game scores.

== Life and career ==
Wandmacher was born in Minneapolis. He began his career composing music for local news media and television commercials before scoring short and feature films by local filmmakers. While following a series of email exchanges that started via a film music newsgroup, Wandmacher met Alan Silvestri and was invited to Los Angeles to participate in several scoring sessions. They composed music for the English-language releases of several Jackie Chan films including Armour of God and Drunken Master II. He eventually found success with the black comedy horror film Modern Vampires. Wandmacher co-composed the score with Danny Elfman, the brother of the film's director Richard Elfman. Wandmacher permanently relocated to Los Angeles.

The majority of Wandmacher's work consists of genre films particularly horror and thriller films. In 2015, Wandmacher composed the score to the role-playing video game Bloodborne.

Wandmacher also creates remixes under the pseudonym "Khursor". As such, he has worked with Godhead including a track on The Shadow Realigned album. The Khursor remix of Sting's Every Breath You Take was featured on the trailer for the third season of The Americans.

Wandmacher was the string arranger on Evanescence's 2026 album Sanctuary.

== Filmography ==
=== Film ===
Year	Title	Director	Notes
1986	Armour of God	Jackie Chan; Eric Tsang	Miramax English version
1992	Twin Dragons	Ringo Lam; Tsui Hark	Miramax English version
1993	Supercop 2	Stanley Tong	Miramax English version
1994	Drunken Master II	Lau Kar-leung	Miramax English version
1997	Street Gun	Travis Milloy	
1998	Modern Vampires	Richard Elfman	
1998	With or Without You	Wendell Jon Andersson	
1999	Freestyle: The Victories of Dan Gable	Kevin Kelley	Documentary
2000	Farewell, My Love	Randall Fontana	
2001	The Accidental Spy	Teddy Chan	Miramax English version
2001	Max Keeble's Big Move	Tim Hill	
2001	On the Borderline	Michael Oblowitz	
2003	From Justin to Kelly	Robert Iscove	Composed with Gregory Siff
2005	Cry Wolf	Jeff Wadlow	
2007	The Killing Floor	Gideon Raff	
2007	Man of Two Havanas	Vivien Lesnik Weisman	Documentary
2008	Never Back Down	Jeff Wadlow	
2008	Train	Gideon Raff	
2008	Punisher: War Zone	Lexi Alexander	
2009	My Bloody Valentine 3D	Patrick Lussier	
2010	Freakonomics	Various	Documentary
2010	Piranha 3D	Alexandre Aja	
2011	Drive Angry	Patrick Lussier	
2012	Werewolf: The Beast Among Us	Louis Morneau	
2013	The Haunting in Connecticut 2: Ghosts of Georgia	Tom Elkins	
2013	The Last Exorcism Part II	Ed Gass-Donnelly	
2014	13 Sins	Daniel Stamm	
2016	Underworld: Blood Wars	Anna Foerster	
2017	Voice from the Stone	Eric Dennis Howell	
2017	A Symphony of Hope	Brian Weidling	Documentary
2018	Patient Zero	Stefan Ruzowitzky	
2019	Trick	Patrick Lussier	
2024	Aftermath	Patrick Lussier	
TBD	47 Meters Down: The Wreck	Patrick Lussier	Post-production

=== Television ===
Year	Title	Notes
1997	Tokyo Pig	US version
2002	She Spies	
2005–06	Night Stalker	10 episodes
2006	South Beach	9 episodes
2011–12	Breaking In	19 episodes
2013–23	The Goldbergs	163 episodes
2017	Imaginary Mary	5 episodes
2018	Into the Dark	Episode: "Flesh & Blood"
2019–20	Schooled	34 episodes

==== TV films and miniseries ====
Year	Title	Director
2004	Crimes of Fashion	Stuart Gillard
2009	Ben 10: Alien Swarm	Alex Winter

=== Video games ===
Year	Title	Notes
2005	Madagascar	
2006	Over the Hedge	
2008	Madagascar: Escape 2 Africa	
2010	Singularity	Composed with Charlie Clouser
2012	Twisted Metal	
2015	Bloodborne	Composed with Ryan Amon, Tsukasa Saitoh, Yuka Kitamura, Nobuyoshi Suzuki and Cris Velasco
