= Big Dismal =

American Christian rock band

- Origin: Florida
- Genre: Christian rock
- Years active: 2003–2005, 2023-present
- Label: Wind-up
- Members: Eric Durrance; Chuck Shea; Gary Sobel; Corey Lane

Big Dismal is a Florida-based Christian rock band, which released three albums. Their first, Believe, was released by Wind-up Records in May 2003. The band was active until 2005, and then reformed in 2023.

== History ==
The band formed in Tallahassee, Florida in the late 1990s, with Eric Durrance singing from 2003 to 2005. Other band members included guitarist Chuck Shea, bassist Gary Sobel, and drummer Corey Lane. Durrance left the band after two years.

Their debut album was released by Wind-up Records, which (according to Rolling Stone) while not officially Christian in its affiliation, marketed the band (and others, like 12 Stones), to a Christian and mainstream market. Its single "Reality" reached No. 3 in the Christian rock charts.

The band had three consecutive No. 1 singles off their debut record, Believe on Christian Rock radio ("Remember (I.O.U.)", "Reality" and "Just the Same"). "Remember (I.O.U.)" was named Song of the Year in Christian Rock Radio by Radio and Records, having remained at No. 1 on the chart for six weeks. Big Dismal was named Band of the Year in the Christian Rock market by Radio and Records and were also nominated for a Dove award in 2004 for Christian Rock Album of the Year.

The band reformed to release two singles 20 years after their debut, releasing "Fly Again" (2023) and "Stay in the Fight"(2023). "Fly Again" went to #1 on ChristianRock Radio charts, and "Stay in the Fight" went to #1 on the same charts and remained there for over 30 weeks in 2024.

== Discography ==
Studio albums

- Believe – Released: May 20, 2003, Wind-up

Singles

- Fly Again – Released February 2023, Independent Release
- Stay in the Fight – Released December 2023, Independent Release

=== Other ===
- "Rainy Day" and "Reason I Live", on The Passion of the Christ: Songs (2004)
