= Dave Eggar =

American cellist, pianist and composer

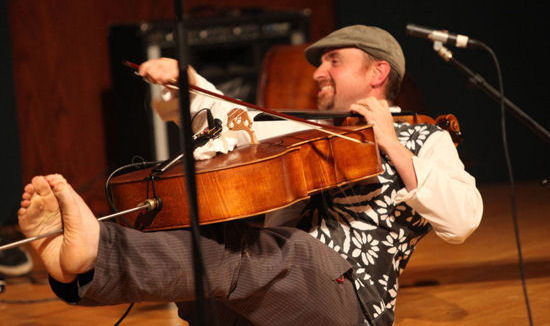
- Eggar in 2017

Background information
- Born: New York, United States
- Genres: Jazz; classical; world; reggae
- Occupations: Musician; composer
- Instruments: Cello; piano
- Years active: 1998–present
- Labels: Domo; Chesky
- Website: www.domomusicgroup.com/daveeggar

Dave Eggar is an American cellist, pianist and composer.

== Early life ==
Eggar was a musical prodigy as a child, beginning to play the cello and piano at age three and performing as a singer and actor on Broadway and at the Metropolitan Opera at age seven. He trained as a classical cellist at the Juilliard School, and later graduated from Harvard University and the Juilliard School's Doctoral Program. He debuted in Carnegie Hall at 15 as the youngest winner in the history of the Artists International competition. He has appeared throughout the world as a classical soloist, including concerto appearances at Avery Fisher Hall, Carnegie Hall, London's Barbican Center, the Paris Opera, and the Hollywood Bowl. In fact, that is Dave's cello leading the way at the top of Coldplay's "Viva La Vida". He is the winner of the prestigious Sony Elevated Standards Awards for Excellence in classical music. Eggar has appeared as featured soloist with the Thailand Philharmonic, The Sydney Symphony, the Melbourne Symphony, The Aspen Festival Orchestra, The Juilliard Orchestra, The Harvard-Radcliffe Orchestra, the Queensland Symphony, Phiharmonia Virtuosi, the Westchester Symphony, Stamford Symphony, the Metropolitan Opera Orchestra and the New York Philharmonic.

A virtuoso in many styles on both piano and cello, Eggar has performed, recorded, and arranged for artists in many genres including Phillip Phillips, Tony Bennett, Lindsey Stirling, Andrea Bocelli, Frank Ocean, Talib Kweli, Evanescence, Chromeo, RJD2, Fall Out Boy, Patti Smith, Michael Brecker, Chris Potter, Dave Sanborn, John Pattitucci, Mark Jackson, Amy Winehouse, Foreigner, Harry Belafonte, Meryl Streep, Lonnie Holley, Paul Simon, James Taylor, O.A.R., Beyoncé, Imagine Dragons, Nate Ruess, Gavin DeGraw, John Legend, Taylor Swift, Coldplay, Brett Eldredge, Ingrid Michaelson, Zayn Malik, Rachel Platten, A Great Big World, Breaking Benjamin, Five for Fighting, The Manhattan Transfer, Richard Bona, Roberta Flack, David Foster, Josh Groban, Trans-Siberian Orchestra, Grace VanderWaal, King Princess, H.E.R., Fiona Apple, King Princess, Bon Jovi, Roberta Flack, Abbey Lincoln, Joshua Bell, Wynton Marsalis, Carly Simon, DJ Spooky, Pete Seeger, Ralph Stanley, Robin and Linda Williams, Amber Rubarth, Gil Goldstein, Lucia Micarelli, Jukebox the Ghost, Martín Zarzar, Dina Fanai, and Esperanza Spalding.

Eggar's work is prominently featured on Esperanza Spalding's Grammy-winning record Chamber Music Society and Frank Ocean's Channel Orange. Dave toured extensively in 2012-2015 as a regular member of the Phillip Phillips Band (winner of American Idol 2011. He has also performed frequently as the solo cellist with singer Amy Lee and Evanescence. He regularly tours with his own band Deoro and with the Craig St Ramblers. 2017-2018 Saw Mr. Eggar on tour with Evanescence worldwide as part of the "Synthesis" Tour. Summer 2018 Eggar collaborative project "Cellogram" With Chuck Palmer opened for the Evanescence/Lindsey Stirling co-bill tour in 31 Cities. Cellogram's self-titled EP peaked at no 2 on the World Music iTunes Charts.

Mr. Eggar's own record, Kingston Morning (produced by Chuck Palmer) was nominated for a Grammy in 2011 for their version of Michael Brecker's epic song "Itsbynne Reel". The team's subsequent record "Deoro XX" won the Popular Voting Award for World Beat at the Independent Music awards the following year. Mr. Eggar has a long relationship with Chesky records, producing David Chesky's record Area 51 in 2006 which was nominated for a Grammy, and recording and producing "String Theory: The Concertos of David Chesky", which won Best Classical Record at the Independent Music Awards (2012). His latest release: Aftermath: Music from and Inspired by the film War Story is a collaboration with Evanescence composer and front woman Amy Lee. The team composed the score to Marc Jackson's film and then released Aftermath as a soundtrack with bonus tracks. Aftermath debuted at No. 3 on the Billboard Soundtrack Charts and No. 47 on the Billboard Top 200 Albums Chart.

A founding member of the FLUX string quartet, Mr. Eggar has premiered over 100 works of contemporary composers such as Morton Feldman, Charles Ives, John Cage, Alvin Lucier, Robert Paterson, Conlon Nancarrow, Frank Zappa, Sir Harrison Birtwhistle, Augusta Ried Thomas, Roger Reynolds, Somei Satoh, Ornette Colemann, Anthony Braxton, Gregg Kallor, Elliott Sharp and many others. He has also performed with numerous contemporary classical music ensembles, and is currently a core member of the highly acclaimed American Modern Ensemble in New York City.

Eggar's compositions and playing can be heard in the worlds of dance and film. He has collaborated with the New York City Ballet, the Jose Limon Company, Attack Theater, Pendulum Aerial Arts, Shen Wei Dance, KAIROS Dance Theater, San Francisco Ballet, and Complexions Contemporary Ballet. In 2014-2015 he created in collaboration with Bylle Redford, Will Calhoun, Chuck Palmer called "The Way of the Rain" featuring special guest Robert Redford. This unique show, which creates a powerful dialogue between music, visual arts, and dance, was performed January 2015 as an official Special Events selection of the Sundance Film Festival at the Complex in Salt Lake City Utah. Eggar has won fellowships and awards from ASCAP, The Leonard Bernstein Foundation, National Foundation for Advancement in the Arts, The MacDowell Colony, Yaddo, Japan/US Friendship Commission, National Endowment for the Arts and many others.

When not onstage, Dave is an avid Karate student and attends the Shotojuku Dojo in Astoria where he studies Shotokan with senseis Kai Leung, James Luk and Eddie Nieto. On January 17, 2016, Eggar received his Black Belt from the Shotojuku Dojo.

== Discography ==
- Serenity (1998)
- Angelic Embrace (2002)
- Left of Blue (2005)
- Kingston Morning (2010)
- The Yoga Sessions: Mozart (2010)
- Deoro XX (2011)
- String Theory (2011)(Chesky)
- Aftermath (with Amy Lee) (2014)
- Skillet – Unleashed (I Want to Live) (2015)
- Indigo Grey (2015)
- From the Mountaintop (performed as The New Appalachians) (2015)
- Dragonfly (2024)

With Abbey Lincoln

- Abbey Sings Abbey (Verve, 2006 [2007])

With Chris Potter

- Song for Anyone (Sunnyside, 2007)
- Imaginary Cities (ECM, 2013 [2015])
