= Lost Whispers =

Compilation album by Evanescence
- Released: December 9, 2016
- Recorded: 2002–2016
- Studios: MSR, New York City (Note: Track 2)
- Length: 42:16
- Label: Bicycle Music Company
- Producers: Amy Lee; Dave Fortman; Nick Raskulinecz

Evanescence chronology
Evanescence (2011)	Lost Whispers (2016)	Synthesis (2017)

Lost Whispers is a compilation album by American rock band Evanescence. It was released on December 9, 2016 on digital music platforms, and included in the six-LP vinyl box set The Ultimate Collection released on February 17, 2017, by Bicycle Music Company. The album is a collection of B-sides, outtakes, bonus tracks, and two new recordings: "Lost Whispers", a 2009 tour intro, and a re-recording of "Even in Death", originally on their 2000 demo album, Origin.

== Background and release ==
After the world tour for their 2011 self-titled third studio album, Evanescence took a hiatus from November 2012 to April 2015, during which the members pursued their own projects. During that period, Evanescence also parted ways with their long-term record label Wind-up Records. Amy Lee stated that she was working on solo projects, and there were no current plans for new Evanescence music yet, but the band would continue to tour. In February 2016, Lee said the band was working on a vinyl box set.

On October 11, 2016, the band announced the six-LP vinyl box set The Ultimate Collection. It includes all three Evanescence studio albums—Fallen (2003), The Open Door (2006), and Evanescence (2011)—the previously unreleased 2000 demo CD Origin, the compilation album Lost Whispers, a studio version of the tour intro "Lost Whispers", a studio recording of the song "Even In Death", as well as a 52-page casebound book with art, handwritten lyrics, photos and rarities. On December 9, 2016, Lost Whispers was independently made available for streaming and download on several music platforms, including the iTunes Store, Spotify and Anghami. It includes a recording of the intro "Lost Whispers", originally performed in a 2009 concert; the re-recorded and reworked "Even in Death"; the song "Missing" from their first live album Anywhere but Home (2004); the studio version of "Breathe No More" from the Elektra soundtrack; and B-sides, outtakes, and bonus tracks from all three of their studio albums. The six-LP box set was released on February 17, 2017, by The Bicycle Music Company.

A song from 1996, "Even in Death" was a "rough demo" that Lee wanted to re-record and include on Fallen. Lee said re-recording it felt "like that song was truly redeemed because the early recording we have is not an enjoyable recording, but I really love that song. It was a beautiful experience to be able to take that and live in it now and give it the treatment I would give to any one of our songs with the ability I have now. Now I'm in love with that song again." The recording of "Even in Death" was uploaded on the band's official YouTube account on February 16, 2017.

Craft Recordings released a stand-alone re-issue of Lost Whispers on blue translucent vinyl for Record Store Day on April 21, 2018, limited to 2,500 copies.

== Track listing ==
No.	Title	Writer(s)	Length
1.	"Lost Whispers" (intro)	Amy Lee	0:59
2.	"Even in Death" (2016 version)	Lee; Ben Moody; David Hodges	4:22
3.	"Missing" (from Anywhere but Home)	Lee; Moody; Hodges	4:16
4.	"Farther Away" ("Bring Me to Life" B-side)	Lee; Moody; Hodges	3:59
5.	"Breathe No More" (from Elektra soundtrack)	Lee	3:49
6.	"If You Don't Mind" (The Open Door outtake)	Lee; Will Boyd; Terry Balsamo	2:57
7.	"Together Again" (The Open Door outtake)	Lee	3:19
8.	"The Last Song I'm Wasting on You" ("Lithium" B-side)	Lee	4:07
9.	"A New Way to Bleed" (from Evanescence deluxe edition)	Evanescence	3:46
10.	"Say You Will" (from Evanescence deluxe edition)	Evanescence	3:41
11.	"Disappear" (from Evanescence deluxe edition)	Evanescence	3:06
12.	"Secret Door" (from Evanescence deluxe edition)	Evanescence; William B. Hunt	3:54
Total length:			42:16

== Release history ==
Region	Date	Format	Label	Ref.
Various	December 9, 2016	Digital download	Bicycle Music Company	
Various	February 17, 2017	LP (as part of The Ultimate Collection)	Bicycle Music Company	
United States	April 21, 2018	LP	Craft Recordings	

== Personnel ==
Credits adapted from the liner notes of Lost Whispers.

- Amy Lee – performer (1, 2), production (1, 2), mixing (1, 2), engineering (1)
- Dave Eggar – performer (2)
- Dave Fortman – production (3–8)
- Nick Raskulinecz – production (9–12)
- Derik Lee – engineering (2)
- Ryan Dorn – mastering (1, 2)
