= Everybody's Fool =

2004 song by Evanescence

Single by Evanescence

from the album Fallen
- Written: 1999
- Released: May 31, 2004
- Genre: Nu metal
- Length: 3:15
- Label: Wind-up
- Songwriters: Amy Lee; Ben Moody; David Hodges
- Producer: Dave Fortman

Evanescence singles chronology
"My Immortal" (2003)	"Everybody's Fool" (2004)	"Call Me When You're Sober" (2006)

Music video
- "Everybody's Fool" on YouTube

"Everybody's Fool" is a song by American rock band Evanescence from their debut studio album, Fallen. Wind-up Records released the song on May 31, 2004, as the album's fourth and final single. It was written by Amy Lee in 1999 about the promotion of unrealistic and hyper-sexualized ideals of perfection in the music industry, with detrimental influence on the youth's expectations and self-image. Guitarist Ben Moody and David Hodges also share songwriting credits on the song, which was produced by Dave Fortman.

Critical reception towards "Everybody's Fool" was generally positive, with critics highlighting the song's concept and Lee's voice. The accompanying music video was directed by Philipp Stölzl, and features Lee portraying several characters depicting behind-the-scenes struggles and perfected, glamorous images promoted on screen. The song was performed by Evanescence on their first live album and DVD Anywhere but Home (2004).

== Background and release ==
Lee wrote "Everybody's Fool" in 1999 about the lie of pop stardom life and unrealistic, over-sexualized images that warped the youth's expectations. In a 2004 VH1 interview, Lee explained how the song came about: "My little sister was really getting into these, I don't want to offend anyone, but like really fake, cheesy, slutty female cracker-box idols, and it really pissed me off. She started dressing like them and she was like 8 years old. So I gave her the talk and I wrote a song." She said it is not about a specific person, but about a collective of the industry that promotes detrimental images and ideals of perfection while "nobody looks like that. It's all fake and it's really hurting a lot of girls' and women's self images."

Songfacts stated that the song's concept "seems like it's always relevant". When asked about the song in 2016, Lee said that she wrote it as "an angsty teenager" about her "frustration with fakeness" that sprung at the time from all the "bubblegum pop acts" that were "put together like products" influencing young people, including her younger siblings. She said she also acknowledged that "you never know what's going on inside anybody, no matter what they seem like", and that it is a song she has "disconnected" from over the years.

Guitarist Ben Moody and David Hodges also share songwriting credits on the song, produced by Dave Fortman. The Millennium Choir performed background vocals. According to the sheet music published by Alfred Music Publishing at the website Musicnotes.com, "Everybody's Fool" is written in the key of D minor, set in a time signature of common time and performed in a tempo of 92 beats per minute. Lee's vocals in the song range from the note of A_{3} to the note of D_{5}.

When the label planned for a fourth single from the album, Lee wanted the song "Imaginary" to be the single, but the label chose "Everybody's Fool"; it was released as Fallen's fourth and final single on May 31, 2004 in Australia and the United Kingdom.

== Reception ==
"Everybody's Fool" received generally positive reviews. Scott Juba of The Trades graded the song an A, writing that it depicts "the stinging betrayal of deception and the refusal to become blinded by deceit any longer", and a "defiance" in Lee's voice gives it a "bold edge" while its "heavy drums and soaring guitars further enhance the strong sound." Adrien Begrand of PopMatters concluded that the song "take[s] things to a more over-the-top, theatrical level." Simon Cusens of ABC Online gave the song 3 out of 5 stars calling it "a cold, sad and angry song that I would only like to listen to without it being repeated again." MTV News' Joe D'Angelo said that the lyrics "rail against idealistic, media-constructed images" and Lee's "disembodied" voice in the song "resonates"." Sam Law of Kerrang! wrote, "Fittingly, the song itself is an epic substantial showcase of Evanescence's raw power that requires no dressing-up". Johnny Loftus of AllMusic classified "Everybody's Fool" as a nu metal song.

The song peaked at number 36 on Billboard's Alternative Songs chart on May 8, 2004. On June 13, 2004, "Everybody's Fool" debuted and peaked at number 23 on the Australian Singles Chart. It spent five weeks on the chart appearing at number 42 in its last week on July 11, 2004. On the UK Singles Chart, the song debuted at number 24 on June 12, 2004, which became its peak position. The following week, it dropped to number 40, and last charted on June 26 at number 49. It also charted in other European countries upon its release.

== Music video ==
The music video for "Everybody's Fool" was directed by Philipp Stölzl and filmed in Los Angeles, California in mid-April 2004. The video features Lee in different characters, including a wholesome teenager, a biker chick, a pop idol, and a glamorous spokesmodel. Talking about the filming, Lee said: "There's this one scene with everybody on motorbikes that every time I see it I just crack up. It's the slow-mo scene where I take off the helmet and swoosh my hair and look at the camera, and it kills me. It's so hilarious, it's ridiculous. [...] It's a really different thing for us to do because it's not performance at all. Everybody was laughing at me the whole time. I was just like, 'Please don't laugh at me. Just give me five minutes so I can do this.'"

The message of the video is in the name of the products her character advertises, "Lies". Lee conceptualized the video around the lyrics to the song. She said the video is "more along the lines of exposing the real behind-the-scenes [lives] of some of these people. It's basically showing the glamorous lifestyle and the depressed, selfish misery behind it." She added that the topic was "like beating a dead horse at this point, but at the time [of writing the song] Britney Spears was just coming out. But I still think it's relevant." Lee said a lot of scenes were cut from the video by music-video stations, including a pill-popping scene, and she was happy that at least "the blood stayed in".

Joe D'Angelo of MTV News wrote that the video "comments on the correlation between a phony facade and corroded self-esteem." The scenes end with Lee "contemplating her deeds on the verge of tears", and she "realizes that besides the products, her advertisements were also selling negative self-images". The Montreal Gazette's Jordan Zivitz said it is "both an effective statement on impossible ideals of beauty (scenes in which the haggard singer rages in a dingy apartment are contrasted with fake commercials in which she's made up to the nines), and a great satire on picture-perfect videos", while Lee's portrayal has "a ring of truth to it" as she "doesn't have much love for the widely embraced model of human perfection."

== Live performances ==
"Everybody's Fool" was part of the set list of Evanescence's first worldwide tour for Fallen. A live version of the song from their Le Zénith, Paris concert was featured on their first live album and DVD, Anywhere but Home (2004), along with an acoustic version performed in the behind-the-scenes section of the DVD. The band also opened a 2016 US show with the song. Lee said in a 2016 interview that she had "disconnected" from the song, which is why they rarely play it.

== Track listing ==
- European and Australian CD single
1. "Everybody's Fool" (Album Version) – 3:15
2. "Taking Over Me" (Live from Cologne) – 4:06
3. "Whisper" (Live from Cologne) – 5:22
4. "Everybody's Fool" (Instrumental) – 3:15

== Credits and personnel ==
Credits for "Everybody's Fool" are taken from Fallen's liner notes.

- Amy Lee – writing, vocals, piano, keyboards, choral arrangements
- Ben Moody – writing, guitar
- David Hodges – writing, piano, keyboards
- Francesco DiCosmo – bass guitar
- Josh Freese – drums
- The Millennium Choir: Beverly Allen, Dwight Stone, Eric Castro, Geri Allen, Joanne Paratore, Karen Matranga, Lesley Paton, Melanie Jackson, Rick Stubbs, Susan Youngblood, Talaya Trigueros – background vocals
- Dave Fortman – producer, mixer
- Jeremy Parker – engineer

== Charts ==
=== Weekly charts ===
Weekly chart performance for "Everybody's Fool"
Chart (2004)	Peak position
Australia (ARIA)	23
Belgium (Ultratop 50 Flanders)	35
Belgium (Ultratip Bubbling Under Wallonia)	3
Bolivia (Notimex)	5
Greece (IFPI)	11
Ireland (IRMA)	32
Italy (FIMI)	16
Netherlands (Dutch Top 40)	7
Netherlands (Single Top 100)	35
Norway (VG-lista)	17
Scottish Singles Sales (Official Charts)	25
Switzerland (Schweizer Hitparade)	35
UK Singles (Official Charts)	24
US Alternative Airplay (Billboard)	36

=== Year-end charts ===
Year-end chart performance for "Everybody's Fool"
Chart (2004)	Position
Netherlands (Dutch Top 40)	31

== Certifications ==
Region	Certification	Certified units/sales
New Zealand (RMNZ)	Gold	15,000^{‡}
United Kingdom (BPI)	Silver	200,000^{‡}
^{‡} Sales+streaming figures based on certification alone.

== Release history ==
Release dates and formats for "Everybody's Fool"
Region	Date	Format(s)	Label(s)	Ref.
United States	March 8, 2004	Mainstream rock; active rock; alternative radio	Wind-Up	
Australia	May 31, 2004	CD	Wind-up; Epic	
United Kingdom	May 31, 2004	CD	Wind-up; Epic	
