= Origin (Evanescence demo album) =

Demo album by Evanescence
- Released: November 4, 2000
- Studio: Sound Asleep Studios
- Length: 46:27
- Label: Bigwig Enterprises (distribution)

Evanescence chronology
Sound Asleep (1999)	Origin (2000)	Fallen (2003)

Origin is a demo album by American rock band Evanescence. A compilation of demos written and home-recorded by co-founders Amy Lee and Ben Moody from 1996 to 1999, the CD was self-released and sold at local shows, and then packaged to showcase to record labels. It includes songs Lee and Moody composed for their earlier independent EPs in the 1990s, including "Whisper", "Imaginary", and "My Immortal", which appear on their debut album Fallen (2003). A total of 2,000 copies of the CD were made and sold by the website of a local company, Bigwig Enterprises, from November 4, 2000 to 2003.

== Background ==
As Evanescence, Lee and Moody had composed and home-recorded demos, including two EPs, Evanescence (1998) and Sound Asleep (1999), which they sold at their live shows. Their early demos got them airplay on the local modern rock station in Little Rock, which helped them develop a local fanbase. Although they played live with local guest musicians, Evanescence remained a duo. "The idea of a full band playing these songs was something that only came along later", Lee recalled. Moody said that at the time he and Lee were focused on writing music over playing live shows, and they did not want to have a band join their writing process; "we just wanted it to be the two of us and so we'd play once or twice a year." In 2003, Moody stated that he did not remember how many EPs they released, and he viewed their EPs as "really just a means"; CDs "we could sell ourselves at our shows so we could go out and buy pizza. They really weren't official releases".

They sold the demo CD Origin at local shows in 2000. After driving to Memphis, Tennessee to get it mastered at Ardent Studios, they packaged the CD, wanting to shop it to record labels. 500 copies of the CD were initially pressed. A total of 2000 copies were made, and sold starting November 4, 2000 on the website of a local company, Bigwig Enterprises, which promoted it as Evanescence's "debut CD". (Note: Amy Lee: "It has happened. There is a very dodgy company - that would be the perfect way to put it. There's a guy that's ripping people off all over the Internet selling our demos; and he's selling it like it's Evanescence's first CD. It's not our first CD.") The Bigwig website said that "Whisper" was the lead single from Origin, receiving airplay on local radio in Little Rock. Bigwig stated that the CD was out of print by early February 2003, before Evanescence's debut single "Bring Me to Life" was released on the Daredevil soundtrack album. Immediately after the release of their debut album Fallen (2003), the CD was sold for US$400 on eBay. In 2003, Lee and Moody encouraged fans who were interested in their demos to download it rather than purchase it for such high prices online. When Lee was asked about a company acquiring their demos to sell them, she stated: "It has happened. There is a very dodgy company ... There's a guy that's ripping people off all over the Internet selling our demos; and he's selling it like it's Evanescence's first CD. It's not our first CD. [...] If you want to hear our old stuff, if you must, download it please. Don't try to spend your dollars and buy that CD; it has gone for that much before."

Origin contains tracks from Lee and Moody's earlier EPs, including "Whisper", "Imaginary", "My Immortal", and "Where Will You Go", the first three later appearing on Fallen (2003). "Imaginary" and "Where Will You Go" first appeared on the duo's 1998 Evanescence EP, and "My Immortal" was an outtake from that EP. "Whisper" is originally from their 1999 EP Sound Asleep. The track "Even in Death" is from 1996, and is one of the songs Lee wanted on Fallen. They recorded the demos with an 8-track recorder at Moody's apartment and Lee's family's attic. They re-recorded "Whisper" and "Imaginary" for Fallen, while "My Immortal"'s demo recording from Origin was used by their label Wind-up Records on Fallen. As with other releases since the start of Evanescence, Lee was the core writer.

Although initially considered their debut album, Origin is a collection of demos. Lee confirmed it was a dressed up demo CD, and stated in 2003:

"It's not our first CD, it's demos we recorded ... We weren't there yet, we weren't finished, and a lot of the songs are demos of songs that ended up on Fallen. ... We packaged it together and it looks like an album because we were wanting to look professional for record labels."

Moody added: "That wasn't really an album but our demos. We made it into an album to make it more appealing to the record companies, but it was never an official release ... We also did a lot of songs and demos after that. It was just a stepping stone for us." He expressed dissatisfaction with their pre-Fallen material, stating, "we didn't have the technology, so a lot of our early recordings were just shit."

Lee said in 2007 that they were still finding themselves back then, and "it's hard to listen to the really old stuff without laughing at myself a little. But of course those songs will always be special to me, and remind me of a time in my life that was both wonderful and terrible." She stated that she's "always liked the idea of one day putting out a b-sides and rarities CD."

== Release ==
Origin was released commercially in February 2017 as a part of Evanescence's The Ultimate Collection vinyl box set. Deeming it to be "like an embarrassing old diary" for herself, Lee explained why she included it in the box set:

It's something I've always cringed about because ever since we made a real studio album and honed in our sound and became Evanescence and made Fallen, I'm like, 'OK, everything before this we were just practicing.' But many fans love Origin and talk about Origin and wish Origin would be released. I've been against it for 13 years, but for the first time I guess I have enough separation from it to look at it and feel like, 'Y'know what? I see why that's cool. As a fan, I want to listen to that too.' So having that whole change of heart was really huge.

In another interview, she stated:

I can look at it from the outside and appreciate it too. Not just be wrapped up in my own head that nothing is ever good enough, which is an easy path to go down for me. ... I’m finally far enough away from it that I don’t feel like that I’m afraid people are gonna think that’s my ability right there. I think that I've done enough stuff and there's been a space and time in between that I can appreciate it for what it is, which is just the tiny bud of the artist that I've become. And I'm proud of it in a weird way.

Lee re-recorded the track "Even in Death" for the 2016 compilation album Lost Whispers, which was included in the box set. She stated that re-recording it felt "like that song was truly redeemed because the early recording we have is not an enjoyable recording, but I really love that song."

== Critical reception ==
Professional ratings
Review scores
Source	Rating
Spin	2/5 stars

Sam Law of Kerrang! said that "there's limited reason for anyone other than die-hards to seek it out", deeming "Lies" the stand out track for Lee's "towering classical soprano delivery – the peak nu-metal synth/guitar interplay and additional death growls courtesy of Living Sacrifice vocalist Bruce Fitzhugh".

== Track listing ==
All tracks are written by Amy Lee, Ben Moody and David Hodges, except where noted.

Origin track listing
No.	Title	Writer(s)	Length
1.	"Origin" (Intro)		0:35
2.	"Whisper"		3:56
3.	"Imaginary"		3:31
4.	"My Immortal"		4:26
5.	"Where Will You Go"		3:47
6.	"Field of Innocence"		5:13
7.	"Even in Death"		4:09
8.	"Anywhere"		6:03
9.	"Lies"	Lee, Moody	3:49
10.	"Away From Me"		3:30
11.	"Eternal" (Instrumental)		7:22
Total length:			46:27

== Personnel ==
Credits adapted from the liner notes of Origin.

Evanescence

- Amy Lee – vocals, piano, keyboards, arrangements
- Ben Moody – guitar, programming
- David Hodges – keyboards, backing vocals

Production

- Ben Moody – engineering
- Soundforge – recording technology
- Mastered at Ardent Studios in Memphis, Tennessee

Additional musicians

- Will Boyd – bass on "Away From Me"
- Bruce Fitzhugh and Stephanie Pierce – vocals on "Lies"
- Suvi Petrajajrvi, Sara Moore, Catherine Harris, and Samantha Strong – female vocal ensemble on "Field of Innocence"

Additional personnel

- Adrian James – package design
- Amy Bennett – site photography
- Rocky Gray – cover photo
- Ben Moody Sr. – band photography
