= Going Under (Evanescence song) =

2003 song by Evanescence

Single by Evanescence

from the album Fallen
- Released: June 16, 2003
- Genre: Nu metal; gothic metal
- Length: 3:35
- Label: Wind-up
- Songwriters: Amy Lee; Ben Moody; David Hodges
- Producer: Dave Fortman

Evanescence singles chronology
"Bring Me to Life" (2003)	"Going Under" (2003)	"My Immortal" (2003)

Music video
- "Going Under" on YouTube

"Going Under" is a song by American rock band Evanescence from their debut studio album, Fallen (2003). It was released by Wind-up Records as the album's second single on June 16, 2003. Lee wrote the song about coming out of a difficult relationship. Guitarist Ben Moody and David Hodges share songwriting credits on the song, produced by Dave Fortman. Musically, "Going Under" is primarily a nu metal and gothic metal song featuring electronic drum beats and a piano interlude.

"Going Under" received generally positive reviews from music critics, who praised its anthemic theme and Lee's voice. The song charted in the top ten in Greece, Italy, New Zealand, Portugal, and the United Kingdom as well as the top 20 in Australia, Austria, Canada, Finland, France, Germany, Ireland, the Netherlands, Norway, Spain, and Switzerland. It was also certified platinum in New Zealand. An accompanying music video was directed by Philipp Stölzl in Berlin, and the outfits worn in it were designed by Lee. The video depicts a feeling of being trapped and overexposed, with shots of Lee underwater and the band performing live while spectators from the audience and elsewhere turn into demon-like bodies.

== Background and composition ==
Lee wrote "Going Under" about "coming out of a bad relationship". She described the feeling as, "when you're at the end of your rope, when you're at the point where you realize something has to change, that you can't go on living in the situation that you're in." Lee later said that after completing the songs in Fallen that came out of an abusive relationship, she was listening to her words on "Going Under" and felt that in the chorus she would have liked to have written instead the notion of "I'm leaving and I'm not going to put up with this anymore", thinking to herself "you know what you need to do and you're not doing it." The song is an expression of her "coming to the realization that I was going to stand up for myself and make a change", and was the most honest she had been lyrically at the time. Lee wanted it to be the album's first single. The song was produced by Dave Fortman. Ben Moody and David Hodges also share songwriting credits on it.

Lyrically, the song acknowledges a hard relationship that is beyond repair and needs to end, with an empowering angle. Lee's vocals change from a whisper to a scream throughout the song. According to the sheet music published by Alfred Music Publishing on the website Musicnotes.com, "Going Under" is set in common time and performed in slow and free tempo of 84 beats per minute. The verses are in the key of B minor, while the chorus in its relative, D major. Lee's vocal range for the song runs from the low musical note of E_{3} to the high musical note of D_{5}.

AllMusic described "Going Under" as "nu-metal grind lightened by the tinkling pianos and hip-hop-inspired backing vocals". Billboard said the song is characterized by the "stop/start cadence" of the guitar, "rippling piano and Lee's defiant wail". Loudwire called it an "arena ready, anthemic rocker". It was described as one of the band's "gothic metal hits" by The Gamer, and as "goth-meets pop" by Houston Chronicle. MusicOMH said it contains "Lee's temptress vocals, pseudo-electronic beats à la Linkin Park, understated but menacing metallic riffs in the background, and a ripping, radio-friendly rock chorus", alongside goth and pop elements. The Boston Globe said "Going Under" is "a mix of Lee's ethereal soprano, piano interludes, and layers of serrated guitar crunch". In the song, Lee "shifts from a deeper register to her piercing soprano above bracing nu-metal riffs", Rolling Stone wrote.

== Release ==
"Going Under" was initially supposed to serve as the first single from Fallen but its release was scrapped in favor of "Bring Me to Life". It was released as the second single from Fallen on August 18, 2003. The UK single, released 22 September 2003, contains the album version of the song, a live acoustic version recorded at WNOR in Norfolk, Virginia, as well as an acoustic cover of Nirvana's "Heart-Shaped Box" recorded at WXDX-FM in Pittsburgh. The music video for the song is also included on the CD single.

== Critical reception ==
Tim Sendra of AllMusic called "Going Under" "one of the harder tracks" on Fallen. Vik Bansal of MusicOMH said the song "is more than strong enough to ensure Evanescence aren't consigned to the bin of one-hit wonders" after "Bring Me To Life". Sam Law of Kerrang! noted that "Going Under" was "the moment Lee stepped properly into the spotlight", and it became an "unassailable anthem for fans struggling through hard times". Christopher Gray of The Austin Chronicle said that "Going Under" is one of the album's songs connected by "yoking Lee's inner turmoil to the band's tumultuous riffs". In his criticism of the album, PopMatters writer Adrien Begrand deemed Lee's voice and delivery the song's highlight, with her vocals "swirl[ing] around the by-the-numbers guitars and drum machine". Christa Titus, writing for Billboard, regarded "Going Under" to be "just as impressive" as their debut single, and the combination of the guitar's "stop/start cadence", the "rippling piano" and Lee's "defiant wail pack a startling wallop." Rolling Stone said the song is an example of the "horror-movie-level ambience" in the album "that was as chilling as it was campy".

In 2004, "Going Under" was nominated for the Kerrang! Award for Best Single. In 2011, Mary Ouellette of Loudwire placed "Going Under" at number seven on her list of 10 Best Evanescence songs, calling it a "perfect arena ready, anthemic rocker" and praising Lee's gradually increasing vocals, which show "her massive range and ability to control her larger than life pipes." Brittany Porter from AXS placed it at number two on her list of the band's best ten songs in 2016.

== Commercial performance ==
"Going Under" did not chart on the main US Billboard Hot 100, but peaked at number four on the Bubbling Under Hot 100 Singles, which acts as a 25-song extension to the Hot 100. It also peaked at number five on the Alternative Songs chart on October 5, 2003, where it has spent a total of 25 weeks charting. "Going Under" also reached 26 on the US Mainstream Rock chart, and 24 on the Active Rock chart. On March 25, 2017, the song debuted on the Hard Rock Digital Song Sales chart, and peaked at number 14 on April 10, 2021.

The single entered the top 30 in various countries across Europe. It debuted and peaked at number eight on the UK Singles Chart on October 4, 2003, and at number two on the UK Rock & Metal Singles and Albums Charts. In 2013, it re-entered the UK Rock & Metal Singles and Albums Charts at the position of 23. In Italy, the song debuted at number 16 on October 16, 2003 and later peaked at number nine on January 1, 2004, spending a total of five weeks in the chart's top 20. "Going Under" also peaked at number 16 in France, number 15 in Germany and 13 in Switzerland. In Australia, it debuted and peaked at number 14 on the ARIA charts on August 31, 2003. It was certified gold by the Australian Recording Industry Association (ARIA) in 2003, denoting shipment of 35,000 copies in that country. In New Zealand, the song peaked at number four on October 5, 2003 and spent a total of 13 weeks on the chart.

== Music video ==
The music video for "Going Under" was filmed in Berlin, Germany under the direction of Philipp Stölzl, the same director of the clip for "Bring Me to Life". Lee designed both outfits she wears in the music video. She stitched the white dress used in the underwater scenes during her recovery from an illness at a hotel in Los Angeles, California, which was the original filming location intended for the music video. She said that the dress was ripped up and contained "shreds of different fabric" that swirl underwater; she deemed it something "someone who died would wear". The red corset she wears was custom-made for US$2,500.

The video begins with Lee in a dressing room before a concert, with multiple women touching her face and their faces begin to distort. Moody is shown being overwhelmed by several reporters and photographers at a press conference, where he sees their faces distort. Lee and the band perform the song on stage, and throughout the performance the audience's faces transform from normal to demonic-like zombies. Several shots show Lee underwater, surrounded by glowing jellyfish. At the end of the video, Lee looks at Moody whose face shortly turns into a demon, alarming Lee who walks offstage.

In 2013, Lee explained that the video was a hint at the more plastic, darker side of fame, and "bit of a metaphor to my feelings about being so overexposed all of a sudden ... It felt pretty unnatural at times, and it is a little scary when it feels like everybody feels like they know you inside and out on a very deep level ... [the video is] a little bit of an allusion to that." According to Joe D'Angelo of MTV News, the shots of Lee drowning in the video show a "distressed and emotionally wrought heroine". The video ranked at number four on Billboard's list of The 15 Scariest Music Videos Ever in 2013, writing: "Evanescence compares the trappings of fame to being haunted by ghouls". In 2016, the song's video was also included on the UK Official Charts Company's list titled "13 of the scariest, spine-chilling videos in the history of music", with writer Justin Myers calling the scenes of audience members turning into zombies "pretty freaky".

== Live performances and usage in media ==
Evanescence performed the song live at the 2003 Teen Choice Awards taking place on August 2, and at the 2003 American Music Awards on November 16. A live performance of the song from their Le Zénith, Paris concert during the Fallen tour is featured on their 2004 live album and DVD, Anywhere but Home. Evanescence performed the song at the 2011 Rock in Rio festival on October 2, 2011, and on Jimmy Kimmel Live! on October 15, 2011.

"Going Under" can be heard in the credits of the video game Enter the Matrix, and also features at the end of the trailer of the 2006 film Tristan & Isolde. The song was also released as downloadable content for Rock Band Network.

== Track listings ==
- CD single
1. "Going Under" (album version) – 3:34
- European CD maxi-single
1. "Going Under" (album version) – 3:34
2. "Going Under" (live acoustic version) – 3:12
3. "Heart-Shaped Box" (Nirvana cover, live acoustic version) – 2:47
4. "Going Under" (video version) – 4:00
- German and Canadian single
1. "Going Under" (album version) – 3:36
2. "Going Under" (live acoustic version) – 2:52

== Charts ==
=== Weekly charts ===
Weekly chart performance for "Going Under"
Chart (2003–2004)	Peak position
Australia (ARIA)	14
Austria (Ö3 Austria Top 40)	14
Belgium (Ultratop 50 Flanders)	28
Belgium (Ultratop 50 Wallonia)	37
Canada (Billboard)	14
Finland (Suomen virallinen lista)	19
France (SNEP)	16
Germany (GfK)	15
Greece (IFPI)	9
Ireland (IRMA)	18
Italy (FIMI)	9
Netherlands (Dutch Top 40)	26
Netherlands (Single Top 100)	16
New Zealand (Recorded Music NZ)	4
Norway (VG-lista)	12
Portugal (AFP)	2
Romania (Romanian Top 100)	99
Scottish Singles Sales (Official Charts)	9
Spain (Promusicae)	17
Sweden (Sverigetopplistan)	11
Switzerland (Schweizer Hitparade)	13
UK Singles (Official Charts)	8
UK Rock & Metal (Official Charts)	2
US Alternative Airplay (Billboard)	5
US Bubbling Under Hot 100 (Billboard)	4
US Mainstream Rock Airplay (Billboard)	26

Chart (2013)	Peak position
UK Rock & Metal (OCC)	23

Chart (2021)	Peak position
Canada Digital Song Sales (Billboard)	37

=== Year-end charts ===
Year-end chart performance for "Going Under"
Chart (2003)	Position
Australian Rock (ARIA)	6
Netherlands (Dutch Top 40)	186
Sweden (Hitlistan)	58
Switzerland (Schweizer Hitparade)	79
UK Singles (OCC)	194
US Modern Rock Tracks (Billboard)	21

Chart (2004)	Position
Brazil (Crowley)	71

== Certifications ==
Certifications and sales for "Going Under"
Region	Certification	Certified units/sales
Australia (ARIA)	Gold	35,000^{^}
Brazil (Pro-Música Brasil)	Gold	30,000^{‡}
Denmark (IFPI Danmark)	Gold	45,000^{‡}
New Zealand (RMNZ)	Platinum	30,000^{‡}
United Kingdom (BPI)	Platinum	600,000^{‡}
^{^} Shipments figures based on certification alone.^{‡} Sales+streaming figures based on certification alone.

== Release history ==
Release dates and formats for "Going Under"
Region	Date	Format(s)	Label(s)	Ref.
United States	June 16, 2003	Alternative radio	Wind-up	
United States	July 7, 2003	Mainstream rock; active rock radio	Wind-up	
Australia	August 18, 2003	CD	Wind-up	
United States	August 25, 2003	Hot adult contemporary; contemporary hit radio	Wind-up	
Europe	September 8, 2003	CD	Wind-up; Epic	
United Kingdom	September 22, 2003	CD; DVD	Wind-up; Epic	
