= Francesco DiCosmo =

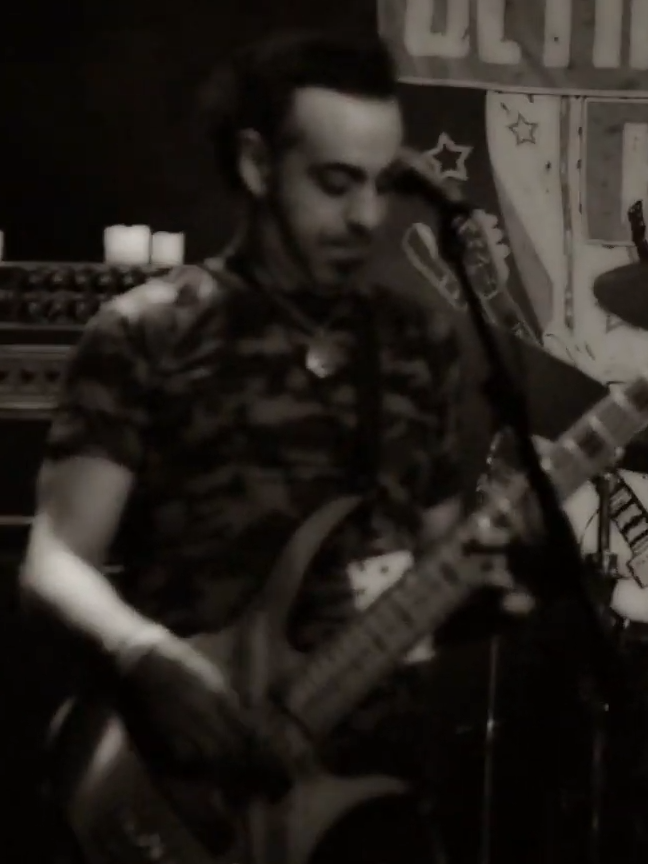
- DiCosmo in 2018

Background information
- Also known as: Cosmo
- Born: September 2, 1963 (age 62); Hartford, Connecticut, US
- Genres: Hard rock
- Occupations: Musician, composer, songwriter
- Instruments: Bass guitar, vocals

Francesco DiCosmo (born September 2, 1963) is an American rock musician, best known for his work with Evanescence, Thin Lizzy, and Chris Poland of Megadeth, and is an experienced live bassist and singer, and session musician playing bass guitar, keyboards, and guitar. He has also recently formed his AllStar Band with drummer/vocalist Chad Cancino and guitarist/keyboardist Torbjorn Andersson, and also works as a composer for film and TV.

== Career ==
DiCosmo started to learn the bass guitar aged 15, and played with a number of bands in the northeastern Pennsylvania area, before moving to Los Angeles and being chosen by Billy Sheehan to take part in the Musicians Institute Scholarship Contest. DiCosmo attended the institute during the 1990s, graduating in 1995, and subsequently teaching and providing private tuition.

In the late 1990s, DiCosmo joined Mumbo's Brain with former Megadeth guitarist Chris Poland, and also performed on Poland's solo album Chasing the Sun. He later worked with Stanley Whittaker (ex-Happy the Man), with whom he formed Spirit Noise, along with his brother Rico DiCosmo. He subsequently undertook more session work with a number of artists.

In 2002, DiCosmo worked with Evanescence on their debut album Fallen, which was released the following year. The album produced a number of hit singles featuring DiCosmo's playing, including "Bring Me to Life" and "My Immortal". The album earned the band five nominations at the 46th Grammy Awards: Album of the Year, Best Rock Album, Best Rock Song, Best Hard Rock Performance and Grammy Award for Best New Artist, winning Best New Artist and Best Hard Rock Performance.

Between 2006 and 2009, DiCosmo played bass guitar as a member of Thin Lizzy, in a reformed version of the band in which Phil Lynott originally played bass. DiCosmo performed as part of a line-up featuring guitarists Scott Gorham and John Sykes, and drummer Tommy Aldridge. When Sykes left the band, it was reorganised with a new line-up and DiCosmo was replaced by Marco Mendoza.

DiCosmo later toured with ex-Toto frontman Bobby Kimball, and returned to session work with artists such as Ronnie Montrose and Jason Bonham.
