= Philipp Stölzl =

German director

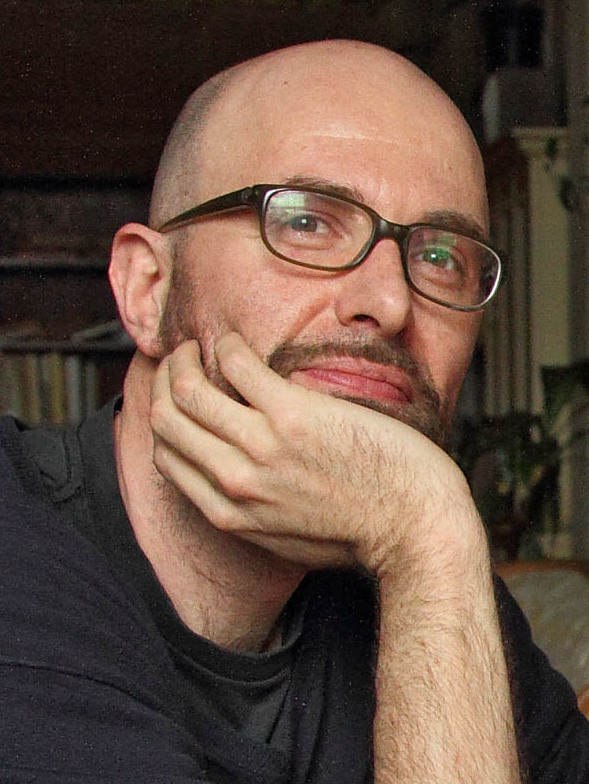
- Stölzl in 2011
- Born: 1967 (age 58–59); Munich, Bavaria, West Germany
- Occupation: Director

Philipp Stölzl (born 1967 in Munich) is a German director. He began to direct music videos in the mid-1990s and directed his first feature film in 2002.

== Life and career ==
Philipp Stölzl was trained as a set and costume designer at the Münchner Kammerspielen where he graduated in 1988. He worked in these professions in German theatres and began to work for films in 1996. He debuted as director in 1998 with the music video for Rammstein's "Du riechst so gut". He has continued to direct videos for artists such as Mick Jagger, Marius Müller-Westernhagen, Madonna, and Garbage's Bond theme "The World Is Not Enough". He has also directed commercials.

His first feature film as director was Baby from 2002. It was followed by North Face (2008), Young Goethe in Love (2010), Erased (2012) and The Physician (2013). Stölzl's work for the opera stage includes a production of Charles Gounod's Faust in 2008 and Giuseppe Verdi's Il trovatore in 2013.

== Selected works ==
=== Films directed ===
- 1999: Morituri Te Salutant (short film)
- 2002: Baby
- 2008: North Face (Nordwand)
- 2010: Young Goethe in Love (Goethe!)
- 2012: Erased
- 2013: The Physician (Der Medicus)
- 2016: Winnetou (TV miniseries)
- 2019: Ich war noch niemals in New York
- 2021: Chess story (Schachnovelle).
- 2025: The Physician II (Der Medicus II)

=== TV series directed ===
- 2023: The Swarm, Adapted from the eponymous novel by Frank Schätzing, co-directed with Barbara Eder and Luke Watson.

=== Operas directed ===
- 2005: Der Freischütz: Südthüringisches Staatstheater
- 2006: Rubens und das Nicht-Euklidische Weib: Ruhrtriennale
- 2007: Benvenuto Cellini: Salzburger Festspiele
- 2008: Faust: Theater Basel
- 2009: Der fliegende Holländer: Theater Basel, later-on also at the Teatro Liceo of Barcelona
- 2010: Rienzi: Deutsche Oper Berlin
- 2010: Die Fledermaus: Staatsoper Stuttgart
- 2011: Orpheus in der Unterwelt: Staatsoper Berlin
- 2012: Parsifal: Deutsche Oper Berlin
- 2013: Il trovatore: Theater an der Wien
- 2013: Il trovatore: Staatsoper Berlin
- 2015: Cavalleria rusticana and Pagliacci: Osterfestspiele Salzburg
- 2018: Frankenstein: Hamburg State Opera at Kampnagel (world premiere)
- 2019: Rigoletto: Bregenzer Festspiele

=== Plays directed ===
- 2014: Frankenstein: Theater Basel

=== Music videos directed ===
- 1997: "Stripsearch": Faith No More
- 1997: "I'm Leavin' U": Bootsy Collins
- 1997: "Du hast": Rammstein
- 1997: "Engel": Rammstein
- 1997: "Das Modell": Rammstein
- 1998: "Stripped": Rammstein
- 1998: "Du riechst so gut": Rammstein
- 1998: "Pretty When You Cry": VAST
- 1998: "Un giorno disumano": Gianna Nannini
- 1998: "Ich bin wieder hier": Marius Müller-Westernhagen
- 1998: "Die Flut": Joachim Witt
- 1998: "Un... ich lauf": Joachim Witt
- 1999: "The World Is Not Enough": Garbage
- 1999: "Easy": Velvet Belly
- 2000: "Supermann": Marius Müller-Westernhagen
- 2000: "Nimm mich mit 2000": Marius Müller-Westernhagen
- 2000: "American Pie": Madonna
- 2000: "Minor Earth Major Sky": A-ha
- 2001: "Rock'n'Roll-Übermensch": Die Ärzte
- 2003: "Bring Me to Life": Evanescence featuring Paul McCoy
- 2003: "Going Under": Evanescence
- 2003: "Il Canto": Luciano Pavarotti
- 2004: "Ich bin die Sehnsucht in dir": Die Toten Hosen
- 2004: "In the Shadows": The Rasmus
- 2004: "Everybody's Fool": Evanescence
- 2004: "Sick and Tired": Anastacia
- 2004: "Old Habits Die Hard": Mick Jagger
- 2005: "Eins": Marius Müller-Westernhagen
- 2005: "Heavy on My Heart": Anastacia
- 2008: "Strom": Die Toten Hosen
