= Baby (2002 film) =

2002 film

- Directed by: Philipp Stölzl
- Written by: Wolfgang Kohlhaase; David Hamblyn
- Cinematography: Michael Mieke
- Edited by: Sven Budelmann
- Music by: Ingo L. Frenzel
- Release dates: 2 July 2002 (Filmfest München); 26 February 2004
- Running time: 104 minutes
- Country: Germany
- Language: German

Baby is a 2002 German drama film directed by Philipp Stölzl, starring Alice Dwyer, Lars Rudolph and Filip Peeters. It tells the tragic story of a father, his daughter and the father's best friend, after the wives of the two men have died in a car crash. The film was Stölzl's feature-film debut.

== Cast ==
- Alice Dwyer as Lilli
- Lars Rudolph as Paul
- Filip Peeters as Frank
- Christian Grashof as Stiefel
- Hamid Bundu as Tommy
- Irina Platon as Lana
- Mischa Hulshof as Johann
- Fedja van Huêt as Polizist
- Marc Prätsch as Wachmann
- Illa Schöppe as Ramona

== Release ==
The film premiered on 2 July 2002 at Filmfest München. It was released theatrically in Germany on 26 February 2004.

== Reception ==
David Rooney of Variety wrote:

A suspenseful melodrama about an unorthodox family unit, Baby represents a slick but distancing feature debut for German commercials and musicvideo director Philipp Stolzl, who made clips for Rammstein, Faith No More, Garbage and Madonna, among others. Blighted by a script that fails to create even one engaging character with any evident emotional transition, the film aims for a droll, dark register but comes off as merely smug and cold.
