= Fallen (Evanescence album) =

- Original physical cover (Note: Reissues have a picture with slightly different colors and with the band's name and album's title covering the top corner of the image.)

Studio album by Evanescence
- Released: March 4, 2003
- Recorded: August–December 2002
- Studios: Track Record, Inc. (North Hollywood, California); Ocean (Burbank, California); NRG (North Hollywood, California); Conway (Hollywood, California)
- Genres: Nu metal; alternative metal; gothic metal
- Length: 48:40
- Label: Wind-up
- Producer: Dave Fortman

Evanescence chronology
Origin (2000)	Fallen (2003)	Anywhere but Home (2004)

Singles from Fallen
- 1. "Bring Me to Life" Released: January 13, 2003; 2. "Going Under" Released: June 16, 2003; 3. "My Immortal" Released: December 8, 2003; 4. "Everybody's Fool" Released: May 31, 2004

Fallen is the debut studio album by American rock band Evanescence, released on March 4, 2003, by Wind-up Records. Co-founders singer and pianist Amy Lee and guitarist Ben Moody began writing and recording songs as Evanescence in 1994, and after independently releasing two EPs and a demo CD, they signed to Wind-up in January 2001. Several of the songs from their earlier independent releases feature on Fallen. The album was recorded between August and December 2002 in several studios in California. It is Evanescence's only studio album to feature Moody, who left the band in October 2003.

The album yielded four singles: "Bring Me to Life", "Going Under", "My Immortal", and "Everybody's Fool". "Bring Me to Life" and "My Immortal" charted in the top 10 of over 10 countries, including the US, UK and Australia. The album topped the charts in more than 10 countries. In the United States, Fallen debuted at number seven on the Billboard 200 with 141,000 copies sold in its first week, peaking at number three in June 2003. It was certified diamond by the Recording Industry Association of America in November 2022, denoting shipments of over 10 million copies in the US. Fallen is Evanescence's most commercially successful album to date, selling over 17 million copies worldwide, making it the sixth best-selling album of the 21st century.

Fallen received generally positive reviews from music critics. Evanescence received five nominations at the 46th Grammy Awards: Album of the Year, Best Rock Album, Best Rock Song, Best Hard Rock Performance, and Best New Artist, winning the latter two. At the following year's ceremony, "My Immortal" was nominated for Best Pop Performance by a Duo or Group with Vocals. Evanescence embarked on their first headlining concert tour, the Fallen Tour, in 2003. A live album and concert DVD with behind the scenes footage was released in 2004, titled Anywhere but Home.

== Background ==
Lee and Moody met as teenagers in Little Rock, Arkansas, in 1994. She brought him a cassette tape of her playing guitar and singing a song she wrote, and they became musical collaborators, playing and working on music at Lee's home, and occasionally performing acoustic sets at book stores and coffee houses in the Little Rock area. Lee had a 16-track recorder that she and him would use alongside Pro Tools, "fake strings and choirs" on her keyboard, and layer sounds and beats for their early material, which they mixed and produced. "We were basically just putting it down to remember what we wanted", Lee said. Lee's musical vision for Evanescence was "the idea of combinations that were unlikely". She aimed to combine her different musical tastes, "bringing something from the cinematic and classical symphonic world and marrying it to metal, hard rock and alternative music." "There was all this music that was inspiring me. And Evanescence was the product of these two extremes combining".

They recorded two independent EPs as Evanescence, self-releasing them in the late 1990s. Their early demos got them airplay on the local modern rock station in Little Rock, which helped them develop a local fanbase, allowing them to play a couple of bigger production shows a year and hire other musicians to perform other instruments live. Although they played with guest musicians, Evanescence remained a duo. "The idea of a full band playing these songs was something that only came along later", Lee said. Moody said that Lee and he were focused on writing music over playing live shows, and they did not want to have a band join their writing process; "we just wanted it to be the two of us and so we'd play once or twice a year." They packaged a demo CD, Origin (2000), to shop it to record labels, and signed with Wind-up Records in 2001. Origin and their earlier EPs contain demo versions of some of the songs that would later appear on Fallen.

In a 2004 MTV interview, Moody said that he and Lee rarely wrote together, it was "maybe two or three times in eight years did we actually sit down and write together in the same room." Lee said that she and Moody never sat down and wrote together, and instead would combine their respective parts in songs. From the start, Lee would only ever write music by herself, considering it a vulnerable process and feeling disrespected by Moody. The creation of Fallen largely consisted of her and Moody writing music separately and then adding to each other's work, due to tension and significant creative differences between them. Lee's creative disagreements with Moody included his strict approach to songwriting and focus on commerciality; he would "always be corralling" her ideas, and wanting to push them in a more commercial, pop direction. She indicated that with Moody there was a "pressure of wanting to rule the world". "It was always a push and pull between us, for me", she said. "Fallen really is a lot of compromise. It definitely leaned toward what he wanted a lot of the time." Creative restrictions included instrumentation decisions such as her wanting to play organ on the record and Moody not wanting that. She stated that at one point, all her "pianoplaying rights were stripped away" from her because Moody felt she "was getting too much attention", so a keyboard player was hired.

Moody said in a 2003 interview that he focused on making the album "as accessible as possible, to as many people as possible". He later conceded that they had different approaches, adding that Lee is "more creative" and "more educated musically", and he is "more commercial minded" and likes making "songs people can adhere to."

Lee expressed that the making of Fallen was stressful because "we had to remember [that] at least one big single had to be totally radio-friendly." In 2006, she said that Moody and the label "packed down and condensed" the original versions of the songs, and she thought that "in some respects, it felt like it was pulling some of the artistic integrity out". In the early 2020s, Lee recalled the process of making Fallen and the obstacles faced:

"When we were making the first album there was so much back-and-forth and so much turmoil between us and the label and each other. I always had to fight to get my music made and I remember focussing more than anything on the work and on the fights and on, 'I’m gonna make this right.' The moment when you finally get to hear it back and enjoy it, those are shorter moments."

Lee deemed the "fight for credibility" as a creator to be one of the biggest challenges she faced early on, explaining: "It was the mentality of labels to tell, especially newer artists, that they need to have writers. ... And the reason that they wanted [men] to do it was because that's where the money was. That's where the power was. Everybody else wanted to be able to say they did that when I did that". She also noted that, for being the frontwoman "people assume that it's not yours. And some of the people around me were more than happy to let them believe that."

In a 2023 retrospective for the album's 20th anniversary, Lee stated that there are musical elements "that exist in the way that I hear things in my head that aren't in the mix on the album", such as some string arrangements and electronics. Lee reconciled with the mix of Fallen after bringing more of those elements to the forefront with Evanescence's 2017 album Synthesis.

== Writing and musical style ==
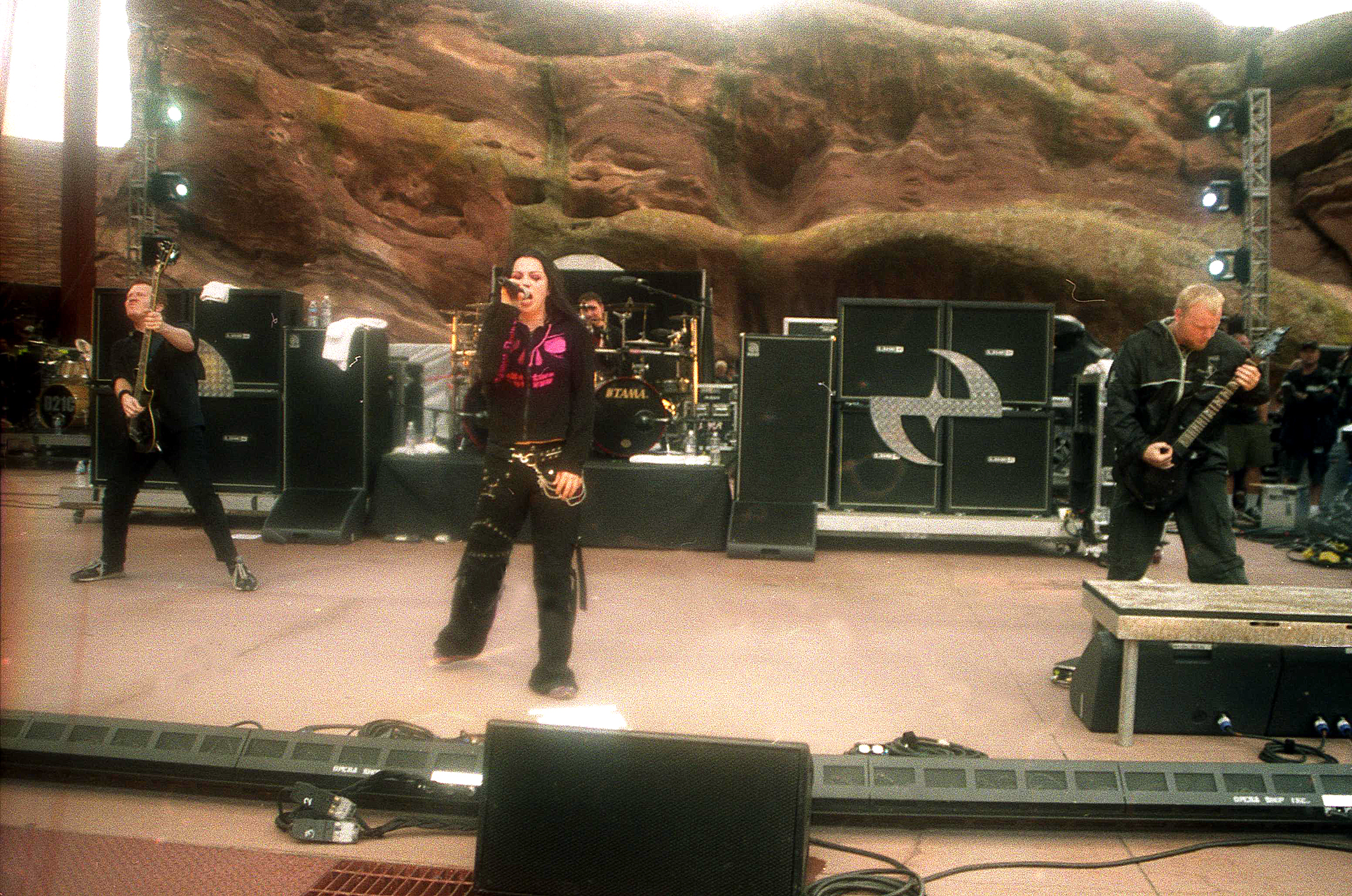
Evanescence performing at Red Rocks Amphitheatre in Morrison, Colorado in 2003

The album's songs were written by Lee and Moody, with Lee the core writer. The two wrote some of the songs when they were 15 and 16. "Imaginary", "My Immortal", and "Whisper" were originally from the duo's independent recordings in the 1990s. Lee composed some of the songs at her house on her keyboard. She wrote songs alone first on the piano or on acoustic guitar, and for Fallen she would write a song and work with Moody to "take it to the finish line." Lee wrote the album's lyrics except "My Immortal"'s, the melodies, much of the music, pianos, and all the choirs; she is credited with the choral arrangements. Lee also honed in on the string arrangements and electronic elements of the album, some of which are in the background.

Most of Lee's writing on Fallen was driven by her mindset during a relationship she was in with an abusive man. Lee wrote "Going Under" about "coming out of a bad relationship". She described the feeling as, "when you're at the end of your rope, when you're at the point where you realize something has to change, that you can't go on living in the situation that you're in." Lee later said that after completing the songs that came out of an abusive relationship, she was listening to her words on "Going Under" and felt that in the chorus she would have liked to have written instead the notion of "I'm leaving and I'm not going to put up with this anymore", thinking to herself "you know what you need to do and you're not doing it." She considered the song the most honest she'd been lyrically and a statement of standing up for herself, in contrast with "Bring Me to Life", which was more of a "cry for help". Billboard said that the "stop/start cadence" of the guitar, "rippling piano and Lee's defiant wail pack a startling wallop".

Written by Lee when she was 19, "Bring Me to Life" is stylistically a nu metal and rap rock song. The label forced them to add the male rapping vocal, which Lee did not want, after originally demanding they include a rap on eight of the songs on the album. She wrote the song after her then-acquaintance and future husband, Josh Hartzler, asked her if she was happy. Lee was in an abusive relationship at the time, and she lied in response, feeling like she "was completely outwardly acting normal". The acquaintance seeing through her facade inspired her to write the track. The song is about "open-mindedness" and "waking up to all the things you've been missing for so long", Lee said, realizing that "for months I'd been numb, just going through the motions of life." "From the sparkling piano to the epic choruses, to Lee's siren call", Billboard considered "Bring Me to Life" Fallen's "definitive track."

Lee wrote "Everybody's Fool" in 1999 about the lie of pop stardom life and unrealistic, over-sexualized images that warped the youth's expectations. In a VH1 interview, Lee explained that the song came about when her little sister was being influenced by such images. She said it is not about a specific person, but about a collective of the industry that promotes detrimental images and ideals of perfection while "nobody looks like that. It's all fake and it's really hurting a lot of girls' and women's self images." Songfacts stated that the song's concept "seems like it's always relevant". When asked about it in 2016, Lee said she wrote it as "an angsty teenager" about her "frustration with fakeness" that sprung at the time from all the "bubblegum pop acts" that were "put together like products" influencing young people, including her younger siblings. She said that she also acknowledged that "you never know what's going on inside anybody, no matter what they seem like", and it is a song she has "disconnected" from over the years, adding:

"It's interesting to write songs when you're in high school and then have them become your most famous songs, because you're stuck singing the stuff you were hung up on when you were in high school when you're 34. And I'm not really hung up about that so much anymore."

"My Immortal" is a piano power ballad, with words written by Moody about a fictional topic and the music written by Lee on piano when they were 15, after which Lee added the bridge. The version on the album is a demo from 2000 using a MIDI keyboard and Lee's vocals as a teen, which the label chose over Lee and Moody's re-recording for Fallen. During the production of Fallen, strings by Daredevil composer Graeme Revell were added to the demo recording. The re-recording Lee and Moody made for Fallen was used for the single and dubbed "band version", featuring guitar, drums and bass after the bridge and a new string arrangement by David Campbell.

"Haunted"'s production emphasizes "feeling overwhelmed by someone’s obsession with you", according to Billboard, with Lee "fighting both being possessed and her desire to give in to it." Lee wrote the song about fiction, thematically "from the eyes of a killer". "Tourniquet" is a reworked cover of Soul Embraced's "My Tourniquet", co-written by Soul Embraced guitarist and Evanescence tour drummer Rocky Gray. Gray told Lee the song was "coming from a Christian standpoint, but it's about suicide. It's from the perspective of someone who has just committed suicide and it's about the controversy in Christianity that if you commit suicide, will you go to heaven or hell?" Lee wrote the cover's melody and added the second verse. The line "I long to die" is from Baz Luhrmann's Romeo + Juliet, a film Lee was "obsessed" with.

"Imaginary" is a song from Lee and Moody's 1998 EP Evanescence. Lee wrote it about feeling the need to retreat to her safe haven as a young teen. Some of her lyrics were from poems she wrote as a seventh or eighth grader. Lee thought it reflected the core sound of Evanescence at the time, and wanted it to be Fallen's fourth single. Billboard described the combination of Lee's lyrics, the piano, "crashing drums" and the Millennial Choir as painting "a picture of the heavens shooting overhead". The midtempo "Taking Over Me"'s lyrics are about Lee being consumed by another person's obsession with her. Partly inspired by her then-acquaintance and future husband, Lee wrote the song as storytelling from the eyes of a stalker.

Lee wrote "Hello" about her little sister who died of an illness when Lee was six years old. The song is about "a day from that time". Lee relived those feelings as a teenager and found it "healing" to write about her experience. The song has a "chilled atmosphere", Billboard stated, and "relates, from a child’s perspective, the dawning agony of realizing someone is gone forever." The lyrics of "My Last Breath" imply a struggle for emotional and physical survival. The song was inspired by the loss from 9/11. "Whisper" is originally from Lee and Moody's 1999 EP Sound Asleep. Driven by guitar and Lee's "commanding voice", it features the "booming" Millennium Choir singing in Latin, ending the album "on a foreboding note", Billboard wrote.

Fallen was regarded as nu metal, alternative metal, alternative rock, gothic rock, and gothic metal. Loudersound described it as a bridge between "nu metal and both the rising symphonic metal and emo scenes". Lee and Moody said they did not consider their music to be "goth", with Moody adding that he thinks the "goth" label came because the songs sound sad and people think that "sad equals dark equals Goth. It's real easy for them to throw us in that box". Moody also disliked the nu metal label, stating: "I think the only nu-metal thing about us is the fact that on one song we have rap and singing". Lee also disagreed with the nu metal tag, attributing it to the rap rock of "Bring Me to Life".

== Recording ==
Fallen was recorded in California at Track Record Studios, NRG Recording Studios, Ocean Studios, and Conway Recording Studios, beginning at Ocean Studios in Burbank. Recorded and mixed from late August to early December 2002, the album was "built on overdubs" to supplement "the depth of production" that the music involves; "this type of record should be done to where it sounds larger than life", producer Dave Fortman said. Moody said he didn't want the album to "sound too fabricated". "I love electronics and I love digital manipulation, but I wanted to first establish us as a real rock band. We're actually playing all of those parts: The strings are real, the choirs are real, the piano is real."

Songs were recorded as demos before the recording sessions. Prior to making Fallen, they had recorded a demo of "My Immortal" at the radio station where Lee's father worked after it was empty late at night; this recording, with Lee's teen demo vocals and a MIDI keyboard, is the version used on Fallen per the label's demand, to Lee's displeasure. She stated:

"It's really hard for me to listen to the album version because we did it two years ago — it was just me and guitarist Ben [Moody], and I've grown so much as a performer since then ... It's not even a real piano. And the sound quality is bad because we had to break into the studio to record it late at night when no one was around because we couldn't afford a real session."

Lee later said she also dislikes it because she "sounds like a little kid" and the album version of the song does not use David Campbell's orchestration. When "My Immortal" became a single, Lee and Moody chose the recording they originally made for Fallen.

Jay Baumgardner lent Moody his guitar gear, including Gibson Les Paul and Gibson SG guitars, Marshall and Mesa Boogie amp heads with an old Mesa Boogie cabinet. Moody said, "It was an old cabinet that was tried-and-true on rock records. It was a no-brainer to use it. I know it was used on Papa Roach and, I think, Staind." The guitars on the album were recorded at Mad Dog Studios in Burbank. Fortman recorded the guitars through two different amps: Marshall on one side and Mesa/Boogie on the other. "The differences tonally and with the different frequencies in the two different amps really do create a larger stereo feel", he said. He used two Shure 57 mics and ran them through Neve 1081 preamps directly to Pro Tools.

Lee's vocals, recorded on a Neumann U47 tube mic, pianos and the background vocals by the Millennium Choir were recorded at NRG Recording Studios. The string arrangements were done by David Campbell and David Hodges except for "My Immortal", which had strings added by composer Graeme Revell for the song's inclusion in the Daredevil soundtrack. Campbell contributed orchestral strings, which was an "expense" Lee fought for as she did not want synthesized strings. A 22-piece string section was recorded in Seattle, and later mixed at the Newman Scoring Stage and Bolero Studios in Los Angeles. To record the 12-member Millennium Choir's voices, Fortman ran a stereo pair of U67s and their voices were then doubled or tripled for a larger sound. In the bridge of "Imaginary", Fortman said "there are probably 70-plus people performing at that moment", including "the choir that's been doubled, a string orchestra with 22 players doubled, then you add all of the bandmembers, and it's huge."

Drum tracks were recorded at Ocean Studios, with Josh Freese playing on selected songs to a click track, stereo guitars and vocals. Fortman recorded Freese's drums with C12As for overheads, Audio-Technica ATM25s on the toms, a D112 on the inside of the kick drum, a U47 on the outside, and an NS-10 speaker as an outside mic. He also used 414 microphones on the ride and hi-hat cymbals. He recorded the drums on two-inch tape on a Studer recorder, and bounced the tracks in Pro Tools.

Fallen was mixed over a two-week period at Conway Recording Studios in North Hollywood, and mastered by Ted Jensen at Sterling Sound in New York City.

Regarding Hodges' involvement in Fallen and his exit from Evanescence thereafter, Moody stated:

"We just ended up going in different directions. We worked well together for a while and then it was like... he's probably going to release solo stuff next year. If you can get a hold of that, you'll understand [and] you'll see how drastically different it is. We were just going in different directions so we chose to split ways before we built the whole image of the band based on somebody that wasn't going to be there."

In another interview, he said that Hodges mostly contributed string arrangements on the album.

== Release and tour ==
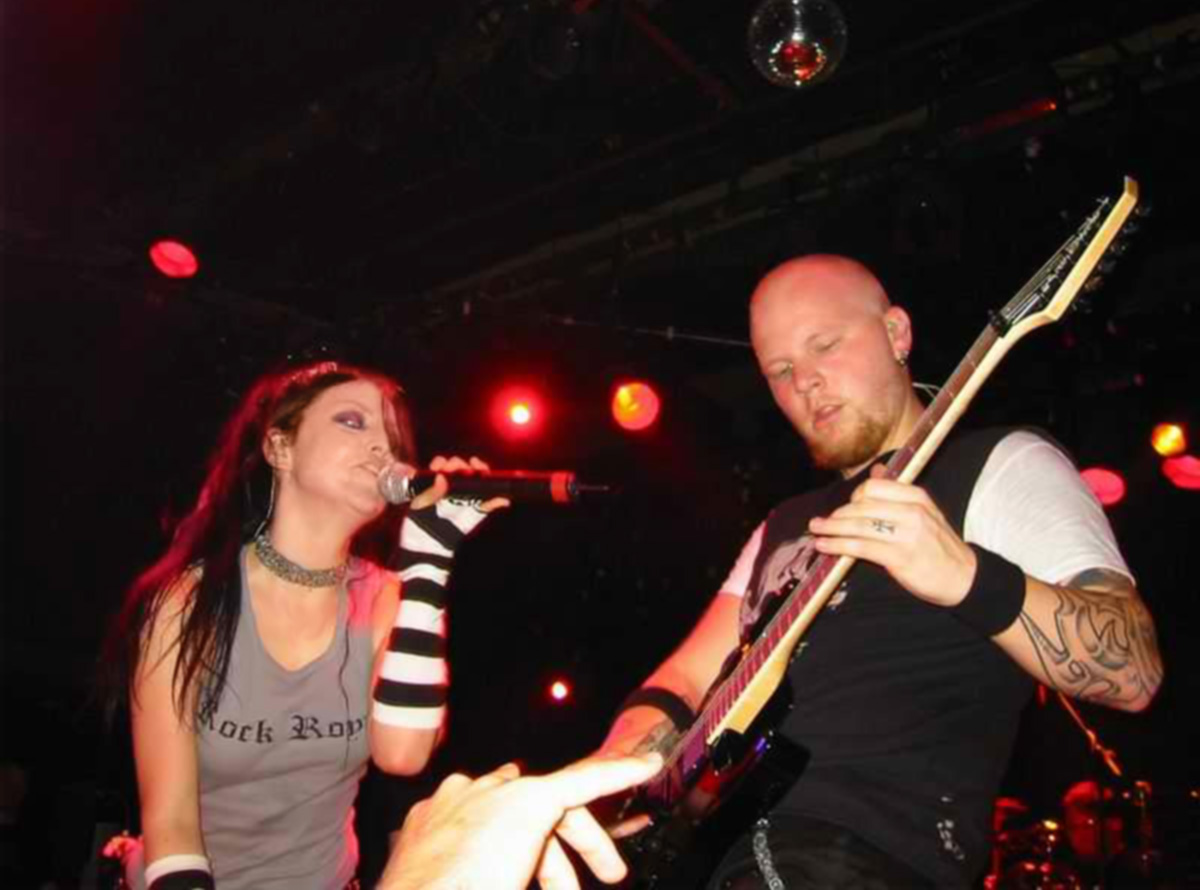
Evanescence's Amy Lee and Ben Moody in a 2003 Barcelona performance

"Bring Me to Life" and "My Immortal" first appeared in the film Daredevil and were included on the film's soundtrack, released in February 2003. Fallen was released on March 4, 2003.

Fallen was initially promoted by the label in the Christian market. Lee and Moody publicly made it clear in an April 2003 interview that they were not a Christian band and did not want to be associated with Christian rock. Moody's comments against being in the Christian market immediately prompted Wind-up Records chairman Alan Meltzer to send a letter to Christian radio and retail outlets explaining that despite the "spiritual underpinning that ignited interest and excitement in the Christian religious community", Evanescence were "a secular band, and as such view their music as entertainment" and the label then "strongly feels that they no longer belong in Christian retail outlets." Wind-up formally requested the recall of Fallen from Christian retailers and radio stations. After receiving the letter, many Christian radio stations pulled Fallen songs from their playlists.

Rolling Stone stated in April 2003 that while Wind-up had no official Christian affiliation, they had been marketing their bands "to both the Christian and mainstream music market." Wind-Up "began courting the Christian music market more than a year ago, making its first foray with 12 Stones' self-titled 2002 debut. Hooking up with powerhouse Christian music distributor Provident ... Wind-Up attempted to tap into a segment that generated sales of more than 50 million albums in 2002". Terry Hemmings, CEO of Provident, said that the decision to recall Evanescence's album likely would not hurt Wind-up's image in the Christian market, and that he was puzzled by the band's about-face, saying: "They clearly understood the album would be sold in these [Christian music] channels." Meltzer claimed their decision to promote Evanescence in the Christian market was made with the band's consent. Lee said that she had always opposed the promotion in the Christian market and the "Christian band" identification from the beginning, while Moody had supported it. Moody had misrepresented Evanescence in the past, talking about his religious beliefs as Evanescence's. The label had wanted to use the Christian market promotion as a marketing tool for the band, which she had opposed, stating that "it was an important fight to me because it felt false. That wasn't really what our music was. And I felt like they were selling somebody something that wasn't true." She noted that Evanescence "has never been a Christian band" and lyrically never had a religious affiliation.

On January 13, 2003, "Bring Me to Life" was released as the album's first single. Wind-up Records president Ed Vetri revealed that when the label introduced the song to radio, radio programmers rejected it, saying, "A chick and a piano? Are you kidding? On rock radio?" Some program directors would hear the female voice and piano at the start of the song and turn it off without listening to the rest of the song. A female voice on rock radio was a rarity, and the song was considered for airplay only after there was a male vocal on it. After the song was released on the Daredevil soundtrack, a grassroots fanbase grew and listeners began requesting air play for it, compelling radio stations to reconsider the band. On the worldwide success of the song, Lee said:

"Since we released [the song] on Daredevil it went all over the world, whether they wanted it to or not, so we had fans in countries we had never been to because they had the soundtrack and they heard it on the radio. So, it started blowing up all over the world and then we had a reason to tour all over the world. And that's how the whole international thing happened this early."

After the album's completion, Evanescence's touring lineup was hired, including guitarist John LeCompt, drummer Rocky Gray, and bassist Will Boyd. Evanescence performed on radio shows and on the festival circuit for weeks in early 2003. They embarked on their first headlining tour from April to May in the US. In June, they had to cancel shows in Germany due to Moody reportedly falling ill. That month, they accepted an offer from the video game company Nintendo to perform on the Nintendo Fusion Tour, which they headlined beginning on August 4, 2003. In an August 2003 interview, Moody said that Evanescence is "just Amy and I, and I want to keep it that way", adding that their process together is what works.

Moody left the band mid-tour in October 2003. Guitarist Terry Balsamo replaced him on tour and as Evanescence's lead guitarist. The band played some shows with Korn in Europe, with Evanescence originally set to headline however Lee wanted Korn to headline instead. Evanescence filmed a Paris concert of the Fallen tour for their first live album and concert DVD, Anywhere but Home (2004).

== Critical reception ==
Professional ratings
Review scores
Source	Rating
AllMusic	(Note: The critic's album rating was 3.5/5 when the review was published. AllMusic later changed the review's rating to 4/5 between November 2020 and March 2021; then to 4.5/5 in 2023; and to 5/5 in 2026.)
The Austin Chronicle	2.5/5 stars
Billboard	4.5/5 stars
Blender	3/5 stars
Cross Rhythms	9/10 stars
Entertainment Weekly	B−
Now	3/5 Ns
Rolling Stone	3/5 stars
Spin	4/5 stars
The Village Voice	B−

Fallen received generally positive reviews from music critics. Johnny Loftus of AllMusic wrote that the album includes "flashes of the single's PG-rated nu-metal ('Everybody's Fool,' 'Going Under'). But it's the symphonic goth rock of groups like Type O Negative that influences most of Fallen." Entertainment Weekly stated: "The genre now too old to be called nü-metal isn't exactly overflowing with spine-tinglingly great vocalists – let alone female ones. Amy Lee ... is an exception." Melissa of Spin characterized the album as having "a powdering of Andrew Lloyd Webber theatrics as Lee aces her piano A-levels, adds a string section, and tackles capital letter issues – God ('Tourniquet'), Love ('Going Under'), and Death ('Bring Me To Life') – with the grandeur they deserve."

Billboard's Christa Titus called Fallen a "highly polished, hook-filled affair." Writing for Rolling Stone, Kirk Miller said that when Lee "croons about lying 'in my field of paper flowers' or 'pouring crimson regret,' she gives Fallen a creepy spiritual tinge that the new-metal boys lack." Adrien Begrand of PopMatters opined that the album "has a small handful of transcendent moments, but a complete lack of musical adventurousness has the band mucking around either in stultifying nu-metal riffage, pretentious high school journal caterwauling, or even worse, both." Begrand praised Lee's "soaring, enchanting, angelic" voice, writing that "Evanescence would be nothing" without her. Christopher Gray of the Austin Chronicle found the album to be "a little too by the numbers to fully capitalize on Lee's obvious talents." According to Village Voice critic Robert Christgau, "their faith, as embodied in Amy Lee's clarion sopralto [sic], lends their goth-metal a palpable sweetness", concluding, "Now if only it wasn't goth-metal at all."

In 2017, Rolling Stone ranked Fallen number 99 on their list of "The 100 Greatest Metal Albums of All Time", calling it an "unlikely classic" with "a horror-movie-level ambience that was as chilling as it was campy". In 2025, Rae Lemeshow-Barooshian of Loudwire ranked Fallen at number 11 on a list of the top 50 nu-metal albums of all time.

== Commercial performance ==
Fallen has sold more than 17 million units worldwide, with 10 million in the US, since its 2003 release. The album debuted at number seven on the Billboard 200, with more than 141,000 copies sold in its first week, Fallen was the eighth-bestselling album of 2004 and the nineteenth-bestselling album of the 2000s. By October 2011 the album had spent 106 weeks on the Billboard 200, with 58 of those weeks in the top 20. Peaking at number three on June 14, 2003, it re-entered the chart at number 192 on March 13, 2010. Fallen spent 223 weeks on the Top Pop Catalog Albums chart after it fell off the Billboard 200. The Recording Industry Association of America (RIAA) certified the album platinum in April 2003 and 4× platinum in January 2004; in November 2022, it was certified diamond for 10 million units sold in the US.

On the UK Albums Chart, Fallen debuted at number 18 with sales of 15,589 copies. The album reached number one (with 38,570 copies sold) seven weeks later, after "Bring Me to Life" topped the UK Singles Chart. It sold 56,193 copies in December 2003, its highest week of sales (although it was number 28 on the chart that week). Fallen spent 33 weeks in the top 20 and 60 weeks in the top 75. It re-entered the UK chart at number 35 the week after the release of Evanescence's second studio album, The Open Door. Fallen also topped the charts in more than ten other countries and reached the top ten in over 20 countries. According to Nielsen SoundScan figures, after more than three months in the top 10 of the Canadian Albums Chart Fallen peaked at number one on August 13, 2003 with sales of 8,900 copies.

== Track listing ==
All tracks are written by Ben Moody, Amy Lee and David Hodges, except where noted.

No.	Title	Writer(s)	Length
1.	"Going Under"		3:34
2.	"Bring Me to Life" (featuring Paul McCoy)		3:55
3.	"Everybody's Fool"		3:15
4.	"My Immortal"	Moody; Lee	4:22
5.	"Haunted"		3:05
6.	"Tourniquet"	Moody; Lee; Hodges; Rocky Gray	4:38
7.	"Imaginary"	Moody; Lee	4:16
8.	"Taking Over Me"	Moody; Lee; Hodges; John LeCompt	3:48
9.	"Hello"		3:40
10.	"My Last Breath"		4:07
11.	"Whisper"	Moody; Lee	5:27
Total length:			44:07

Hidden track on reissued edition
No.	Title	Writer(s)	Length
12.	"My Immortal" (Band Version)	Moody; Lee	4:33
Total length:			48:40

Japanese edition bonus tracks
No.	Title	Writer(s)	Length
12.	"Farther Away"		3:58
13.	"My Immortal" (Band Version)	Moody; Lee	4:33
Total length:			52:38

Limited edition bonus DVD
No.	Title	Length
1.	"Bring Me to Life" (music video)

20th anniversary edition bonus disc and lp
No.	Title	Writer(s)	Length
1.	"My Immortal" (Band Version)	Moody; Lee	4:33
2.	"Breathe No More"	Lee	3:49
3.	"Farther Away"		3:59
4.	"Missing"		4:16
5.	"My Immortal" (Strings Version)	Moody; Lee	4:34
6.	"Bring Me to Life" (Demo 2002)		3:52
7.	"Bring Me to Life" (AOL Session – April 15, 2003)		3:37
8.	"Going Under" (Live Acoustic – 2003)		3:15
9.	"Bring Me to Life" (Live on Triple M’s Garage Session, Australia – June, 2020)		3:41
10.	"My Immortal" (Live at O2 Arena, London – November 14, 2022)	Moody; Lee	4:50
Total length:			40:26

20th anniversary 2-lp super deluxe edition box set bonus cassette (side A)
No.	Title	Writer(s)	Length
1.	"Imaginary" (Demo 10.10.01)	Moody; Lee	3:52
2.	"Whisper" (Demo 10.10.01)		3:38
3.	"Haunted" (Demo 10.10.01)		3:12
4.	"Everybody's Fool" (Final Demo 10.10.02)		2:44
5.	"Taking Over Me" (Demo 11.15.01)	Moody; Lee; Hodges; LeCompt	3:20
6.	"Missing" (Final Demo 10.03.02)		3:22

20th anniversary 2-lp super deluxe edition box set bonus cassette (side B)
No.	Title	Length
1.	"Going Under" (Demo 8.8.02)	3:22
2.	"Tourniquet" (Demo 7.24.02)	3:45
3.	"My Last Breath" (Demo 11.15.01)	3:35
4.	"Bring Me to Life" (Demo 3.18.02)	3:55
5.	"Fallen voice notes"	6:44

=== Notes ===
- "Tourniquet" is a cover of Soul Embraced's "My Tourniquet"
- The Fallen voice notes in the bonus cassette from the 20th anniversary limited 2-lp super deluxe edition contains early recordings of "Breathe No More", "Going Under", "Taking Over Me" and "Bring Me to Life".
- "Breathe No More" was originally a Fallen outtake prior to its inclusion on the soundtrack to the 2005 film Elektra.
- The strings version of "My Immortal" uses the re-recorded vocals.
- The June 2020 live version of "Bring Me to Life" was taken from Amy Lee's Garage Session performance.
- The live recording of "My Immortal" from the O2 Arena stop of the Worlds Collide Tour was mixed by Nick Raskulinecz. In addition to Lee, this version also featured guitarists Troy McLawhorn and Tim McCord, bassist Emma Anzai, and drummer Will Hunt.

== Personnel ==
Credits adapted from the liner notes of Fallen.

Evanescence

- Amy Lee – vocals, choral arrangements
- Ben Moody – guitars, tribal percussion, programming

Additional musicians

- David Hodges – piano, keyboards, additional programming; string arrangements (tracks 1–3, 5–11)
- Francesco DiCosmo – bass
- Josh Freese – drums
- David Campbell – string arrangements (tracks 1–3, 5–11)
- Graeme Revell – string arrangements (track 4)
- Zac Baird – additional programming
- Chris Johnson – additional programming
- Millenium choir – background choir: Beverly Allen, Geri Allen, Eric Castro, Melanie Jackson, Karen Matranga, Joanne Paratore, Lesley Paton, Dwight Stone, Rick Stubbs, Talaya Trigueros, Susan Youngblood (tracks 3, 5, 7, 11)
- Paul McCoy – guest vocals (track 2)

Technical

- Dave Fortman – production (tracks 1–3, 5–11); mixing (tracks 1, 3–11)
- Jay Baumgardner – mixing (track 2)
- Ben Moody – production (track 4); additional Pro Tools engineering
- Jeremy Parker – engineering
- Ted Jensen – mastering
- Jason Cupp – engineering assistance
- Dean Nelson – engineering assistance
- Ai Fujisaki – engineering assistance
- Sergio Chavez – engineering assistance
- Sam Storey – engineering assistance
- Mark Curry – strings recording, strings mixing
- John Rodd – strings recording
- Bill Talbott – strings engineering

Artwork

- Ed Sherman – art direction
- Frank Veronsky – photography

== Charts ==
=== Weekly charts ===
Weekly chart performance for Fallen
Chart (2003–2024)	Peak position
Argentine Albums (CAPIF)	3
Australian Albums (ARIA)	1
Australian Heavy Rock & Metal Albums (ARIA)	1
Austrian Albums (Ö3 Austria)	1
Belgian Albums (Ultratop Flanders)	3
Belgian Albums (Ultratop Wallonia)	4
Canadian Albums (Billboard)	1
Croatian International Albums (HDU)	14
Czech Albums (ČNS IFPI)	7
Danish Albums (Hitlisten)	1
Dutch Albums (Album Top 100)	2
European Albums (Music & Media)	1
Finnish Albums (Suomen virallinen lista)	1
French Albums (SNEP)	2
German Albums (Offizielle Top 100)	2
Greek Albums (IFPI)	2
Hungarian Albums (MAHASZ)	18
Irish Albums (IRMA)	3
Italian Albums (FIMI)	3
Japanese Albums (Oricon)	7
New Zealand Albums (RMNZ)	2
Norwegian Albums (VG-lista)	3
Polish Albums (ZPAV)	3
Portuguese Albums (AFP)	1
Scottish Albums (Official Charts)	1
Singaporean Albums (RIAS)	2
South African Albums (RISA)	3
Spanish Albums (AFYVE)	6
Swedish Albums (Sverigetopplistan)	3
Swiss Albums (Schweizer Hitparade)	2
UK Albums (Official Charts)	1
UK Rock & Metal Albums (Official Charts)	1
US Billboard 200	3
US Top Catalog Albums (Billboard)	1
US Top Christian Albums (Billboard)	1
US Top Hard Rock Albums (Billboard)	2
US Top Rock & Alternative Albums (Billboard)	16

Monthly charts

Monthly chart performance for Fallen
Chart (2004)	Peak position
Russian Albums (NFPF)	3

Decade-end charts

2000s decade-end chart performance for Fallen
Chart (2000–2009)	Position
Australian Albums (ARIA)	15
UK Albums (OCC)	87
US Billboard 200	19

=== Year-end charts ===
2003 year-end chart performance for Fallen
Chart (2003)	Position
Argentine Albums (CAPIF)	13
Australian Albums (ARIA)	15
Australian Heavy Rock & Metal Albums (ARIA)	2
Austrian Albums (Ö3 Austria)	17
Belgian Albums (Ultratop Flanders)	38
Belgian Alternative Albums (Ultratop Flanders)	18
Belgian Albums (Ultratop Wallonia)	17
Danish Albums (Hitlisten)	25
Dutch Albums (Album Top 100)	23
European Albums (Billboard)	3
Finnish Albums (Musiikkituottajat)	2
French Albums (SNEP)	10
German Albums (Offizielle Top 100)	9
Hungarian Albums (MAHASZ)	84
Italian Albums (FIMI)	13
Japanese Albums (Oricon)	54
New Zealand Albums (RMNZ)	6
Spanish Albums (PROMUSICAE)	15
Swedish Albums (Sverigetopplistan)	5
Swedish Albums & Compilations (Sverigetopplistan)	9
Swiss Albums (Schweizer Hitparade)	3
UK Albums (OCC)	15
US Billboard 200	8
Worldwide Albums (IFPI)	7

2004 year-end chart performance for Fallen
Chart (2004)	Position
Argentine Albums (CAPIF)	11
Australian Albums (ARIA)	7
Austrian Albums (Ö3 Austria)	15
Belgian Albums (Ultratop Flanders)	12
Belgian Alternative Albums (Ultratop Flanders)	5
Belgian Albums (Ultratop Wallonia)	16
Danish Albums (Hitlisten)	52
Dutch Albums (Album Top 100)	10
European Albums (Billboard)	5
Finnish Albums (Musiikkituottajat)	16
French Albums (SNEP)	20
German Albums (Offizielle Top 100)	10
Hungarian Albums (MAHASZ)	87
Italian Albums (FIMI)	41
New Zealand Albums (RMNZ)	14
Portuguese Albums (AFP)	5
Swedish Albums (Sverigetopplistan)	39
Swedish Albums & Compilations (Sverigetopplistan)	50
Swiss Albums (Schweizer Hitparade)	15
UK Albums (OCC)	59
US Billboard 200	6
Worldwide Albums (IFPI)	43

2006 year-end chart performance for Fallen
Chart (2006)	Position
Belgian Midprice Albums (Ultratop Flanders)	32
Belgian Midprice Albums (Ultratop Wallonia)	24
UK Albums (OCC)	191
US Catalog Albums (Billboard)	45

2007 year-end chart performance for Fallen
Chart (2007)	Position
US Catalog Albums (Billboard)	22

2008 year-end chart performance for Fallen
Chart (2008)	Position
US Catalog Albums (Billboard)	36

== Certifications and sales ==
Certifications for Fallen
Region	Certification	Certified units/sales
Argentina (CAPIF)	3× Platinum	120,000^{^}
Australia (ARIA)	6× Platinum	420,000^{^}
Austria (IFPI Austria)	Platinum	30,000^{*}
Belgium (BRMA)	Platinum	50,000^{*}
Brazil (Pro-Música Brasil)	2× Platinum	250,000^{*}
Brazil (Pro-Música Brasil) (Deluxe Edition/Remastered 2023)	Platinum	40,000^{‡}
Canada (Music Canada)	7× Platinum	700,000^{^}
Denmark (IFPI Danmark)	4× Platinum	80,000^{‡}
Finland (Musiikkituottajat)	Platinum	56,679
France (SNEP)	2× Platinum	600,000^{*}
Germany (BVMI)	4× Platinum	800,000^{‡}
Greece (IFPI Greece)	2× Platinum	40,000^{^}
Hungary (MAHASZ)	Platinum	20,000^{^}
Italy (FIMI) sales since 2009	Platinum	50,000^{‡}
Japan (RIAJ)	Platinum	250,000^{^}
Mexico (AMPROFON)	Platinum+Gold	225,000^{^}
Netherlands (NVPI)	Platinum	80,000^{^}
New Zealand (RMNZ)	5× Platinum	75,000^{^}
Norway (IFPI Norway)	Platinum	40,000^{*}
Poland (ZPAV)	Gold	20,000^{*}
Portugal (AFP)	2× Platinum	80,000^{^}
Russia (NFPF)	Platinum	20,000^{*}
South Africa (RISA)	Platinum	50,000^{*}
South Korea	—	35,918
Spain (Promusicae)	Platinum	100,000^{^}
Sweden (GLF)	Platinum	60,000^{^}
Switzerland (IFPI Switzerland)	2× Platinum	80,000^{^}
United Kingdom (BPI)	4× Platinum	1,353,676
United States (RIAA)	Diamond	10,000,000^{‡}
Summaries
Europe (IFPI)	3× Platinum	3,000,000^{*}
Worldwide	—	17,000,000
^{*} Sales figures based on certification alone.^{^} Shipments figures based on certification alone.^{‡} Sales+streaming figures based on certification alone.

== Release history ==
Region	Date	Format	Label	Catalog
United States	March 4, 2003	CD; digital download	Wind-up	60150-13063-2
Canada	April 1, 2003	CD; digital download	Wind-up; Epic	EK 91746
Austria	April 28, 2003	CD; digital download	Wind-up; Epic	WIN 510879 2
Germany	April 28, 2003	CD; digital download	Wind-up; Epic	WIN 510879 2
United Kingdom	April 28, 2003	CD; digital download	Wind-up; Epic	WIN 687043 2
Australia	May 19, 2003	CD; digital download	Wind-up; Epic	510879200
France	May 20, 2003	CD; digital download	Wind-up; Epic	WIN 510879 2
Japan	July 7, 2003	CD; digital download	Sony	EICP-253
Japan	September 9, 2003	Limited edition CD+DVD	Sony	EICP-242
Austria	January 26, 2004	CD reissue	Wind-up; Epic	WIN 510879 9
Germany	January 26, 2004	CD reissue	Wind-up; Epic	WIN 510879 9
France	February 4, 2004	CD reissue	Wind-up; Epic	WIN 510879 9
United Kingdom	February 23, 2004	CD reissue	Wind-up; Epic	WIN 510879 9
Austria	September 25, 2009	CD reissue	Wind-up; EMI	WIN 687043 2
Germany	September 25, 2009	CD reissue	Wind-up; EMI	WIN 687043 2
United Kingdom	September 28, 2009	CD reissue	Wind-up; EMI	WIN 687043 2
France	October 5, 2009	CD reissue	Wind-up; EMI	WIN 687043 2
Japan	October 12, 2011	Limited edition CD reissue	EMI	TOCP-54276
United States	May 21, 2013	Remastered LP (black and purple)	Wind-up	60150-13359-1
