= Anywhere but Home =

- Digital cover (Note: Physical editions have the band's name and album's title covering the top left corner of the image.)

Live album by Evanescence
- Released: November 23, 2004
- Recorded: May 25, 2004
- Venues: Le Zénith, Paris
- Genres: Alternative metal; nu metal; gothic metal
- Length: 61:31 (CD); 140:00 (DVD)
- Label: Wind-up
- Producers: James O'Brien; Amy Lee; Dave Fortman

Evanescence chronology
Fallen (2003)	Anywhere but Home (2004)	The Open Door (2006)

Anywhere but Home is the first live album and concert DVD release by American rock band Evanescence. It was released on November 23, 2004, by Wind-up Records. It includes a recording of a concert at Le Zénith in Paris, an hour of behind the scenes footage, three previously unreleased songs, and all four of the Fallen music videos.

== Background and release ==
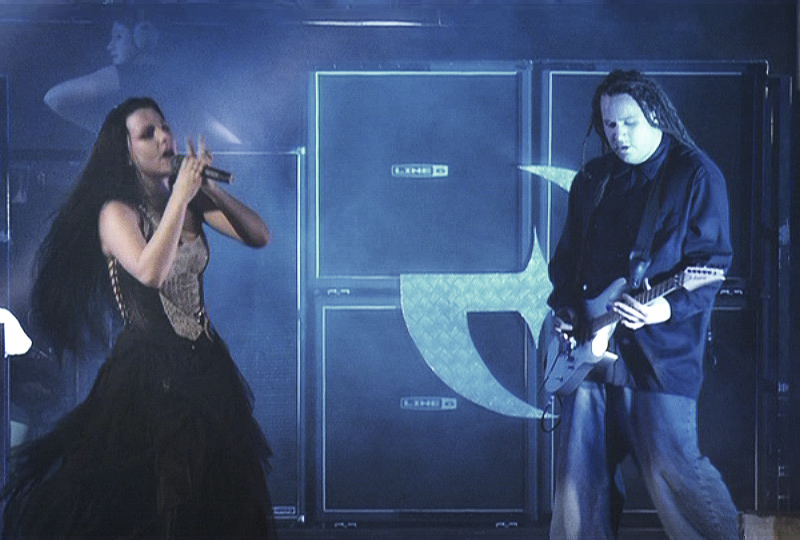
Evanescence performing at Le Zénith, Paris

Anywhere but Home was filmed during Evanescence's concert at Le Zénith in Paris on May 25, 2004. The concert was part of the tour in support of their debut album Fallen (2003). Every song from the album except "Hello" was performed at the show.

Three new songs were released on Anywhere but Home: "Missing", "Breathe No More" (a studio version of the song was later featured on the soundtrack to the 2005 film Elektra), and "Farther Away". While placed at the end of the disc, the CD insert shows "Missing" as track eight but it is actually track 14 and incorrectly labeled "Whisper".

A performance of "Bring Me to Life" from the 2003 Billboard Music Awards in Las Vegas can be found on the DVD's main menu by moving the cursor to the largest thorn on the left-hand side of the screen. The band symbol then becomes visible. When selected, this will take the user to the footage.

In December 2004, a couple in Maryland who had bought the album for their daughter, filed a class action lawsuit against Wal-Mart after hearing the word "fuck" sung during "Thoughtless", a cover of a Korn song. The lawsuit claimed that while the album contained this explicit word, there was no Parental Advisory sticker on the package. It also claimed that the album violated Wal-Mart's policy of not stocking music with explicit lyrics, and that the company had to be aware of the problem because the word was dubbed out of a free sample on the Walmart.com website. The lawsuit was resolved by court order of a deal which would allow those people who bought the album at a Maryland Wal-Mart location to receive a refund. Some copies have the Parental Advisory notice, yet other copies are still sold without it now.

== Reception ==
Professional ratings
Review scores
Source	Rating
AllMusic	3.5/5 stars
Classic Rock	4/5 stars

Johny Loftus of AllMusic deemed the album a "fine holdover" until the band's second studio album, and stated that it "reasserts Amy Lee's position at Evanescence's center" while she was "always the singular force" of Evanescence, with her "powerful vocals, strident public persona, and striking fashion sense [breaking] down the doors of the alternative metal boys club." He further praised Lee's vocals and engagement with the crowd. Geoff Barton of Classic Rock graded Anywhere but Home with four out of five stars.

On the Billboard 200, the album debuted at number 39 on December 11, 2004, selling 59,000 copies in its first week. On the Spanish DVD Chart, Anywhere but Home debuted at number one for the week ending November 28, 2004; it became the best-selling music DVD of 2004 in Spain.

== Track listing ==
=== CD ===
All tracks are written by Ben Moody, Amy Lee and David Hodges, except where noted.

No.	Title	Writer(s)	Length
1.	"Haunted"		4:04
2.	"Going Under"		3:57
3.	"Taking Over Me"	Lee; Moody; Hodges; John LeCompt	3:57
4.	"Everybody's Fool"		3:40
5.	"Thoughtless"	James Shaffer; Jonathan Davis; Brian Welch; Reginald Arvizu; David Silveria	4:37
6.	"My Last Breath"		3:53
7.	"Farther Away"		5:02
8.	"Breathe No More"	Lee	3:33
9.	"My Immortal"	Lee; Moody	4:38
10.	"Bring Me to Life"		4:43
11.	"Tourniquet"	Lee; Moody; Hodges; Rocky Gray	4:17
12.	"Imaginary"	Lee; Moody	5:25
13.	"Whisper"	Lee; Moody	5:45
14.	"Missing"		4:16
Total length:			61:31

=== DVD ===
==== Concert ====
58 minutes

1. "Haunted (intro)"
2. "Haunted"
3. "Going Under"
4. "Taking Over Me"
5. "Everybody's Fool"
6. "Thoughtless" (Korn cover)
7. "My Last Breath"
8. "Farther Away"
9. "Breathe No More"
10. "My Immortal"
11. "Bring Me to Life"
12. "Tourniquet"
13. "Imaginary"
14. "Whisper"

==== Music videos ====
17 minutes

1. "My Immortal"
2. "Everybody's Fool"
3. "Bring Me to Life"
4. "Going Under"

==== Behind the scenes ====
1 hour

1. "Life on the Road"
2. "Showtime"
3. "Bloopers"
4. "Evanescence Unleashed"
5. End credits: "Missing"

==== Extra ====
5 minutes

1. "Bring Me to Life" (Live in Las Vegas, included as an easter egg)

== Personnel ==
- Amy Lee – vocals, piano
- Rocky Gray – drums
- John LeCompt – guitar, vocals on "Bring Me to Life"
- Terry Balsamo – guitar
- William Boyd – bass

== Charts ==
=== Weekly charts ===
Album

Chart (2004–2005)	Peak position
Australian Albums (ARIA)	33
Austrian Albums (Ö3 Austria)	10
Belgian Albums (Ultratop Flanders)	36
Belgian Albums (Ultratop Wallonia)	46
Dutch Albums (Album Top 100)	18
French Albums (SNEP)	22
German Albums (Offizielle Top 100)	19
Greek Albums (IFPI)	1
Irish Albums (IRMA)	52
Italian Albums (FIMI)	33
Japanese Albums (Oricon)	35
Mexican Albums (Top 100 Mexico)	22
New Zealand Albums (RMNZ)	40
Portuguese Albums (AFP)	4
Swiss Albums (Schweizer Hitparade)	10
US Billboard 200	39

Video

Chart (2004–2005)	Peak position
Spanish Music DVD (PROMUSICAE)	1
UK Music Videos (Official Charts)	4
US Top Music Videos (Billboard)	3

=== Year-end charts ===
Video

Chart (2004)	Position
Spanish Music DVD (PROMUSICAE)	1

Album

Chart (2005)	Position
Mexican Albums (Top 100 Mexico)	65

== Certifications ==
Region	Certification	Certified units/sales
Album
Germany (BVMI)	Gold	100,000^{‡}
Greece (IFPI Greece)	Gold	10,000^{^}
Portugal (AFP)	Gold	20,000^{^}
Switzerland (IFPI Switzerland)	Gold	20,000^{^}
United Kingdom (BPI)	Silver	60,000^{‡}
United States (RIAA)	Gold	500,000^{^}
Video
Argentina (CAPIF)	Platinum	8,000^{^}
Australia (ARIA)	2× Platinum	30,000^{^}
Brazil (Pro-Música Brasil)	Gold	25,000^{*}
Canada (Music Canada)	Diamond	100,000^{^}
France (SNEP)	2× Platinum	40,000^{*}
Germany (BVMI)	3× Gold	75,000^{^}
Spain (Promusicae)	2× Platinum	50,000^{^}
United Kingdom (BPI)	Platinum	50,000^{^}
United States (RIAA)	5× Platinum	500,000^{^}
^{*} Sales figures based on certification alone.^{^} Shipments figures based on certification alone.^{‡} Sales+streaming figures based on certification alone.
