= My Immortal (song) =

2003 song by Evanescence

Single by Evanescence

from the album Fallen
- Released: December 8, 2003
- Recorded: 1997 (first demo); 2000 (Origin demo); 2002 ("band" version)
- Studio: NRG Recording (North Hollywood)
- Genre: Alternative rock
- Length: 4:33 ("band" version); 4:22 (album version)
- Label: Wind-up
- Songwriters: Amy Lee; Ben Moody
- Producers: Dave Fortman; Moody

Evanescence singles chronology
"Going Under" (2003)	"My Immortal" (2003)	"Everybody's Fool" (2004)

Music video
- "My Immortal" on YouTube

"My Immortal" is a song by the American rock band Evanescence from their debut album, Fallen (2003). It was released by Wind-up Records on December 8, 2003, as the album's third single, following its inclusion on the soundtrack to the film Daredevil. The song was written by singer and pianist Amy Lee and guitarist Ben Moody when they were 15 years old. Several versions were recorded, with the earliest in 1997. Wind-up used the recording from their 2000 demo CD on Fallen against Lee's wishes, which featured her demo vocals and a MIDI keyboard. Strings from Daredevil composer Graeme Revell were added during the production of Fallen. The single, dubbed "band version", is the re-recording Lee and Moody made for Fallen, featuring guitar, drums and bass and a string arrangement by David Campbell. An alternate version of the song appears on the band's fourth studio album, Synthesis (2017).

"My Immortal" is a piano power ballad, with lyrics about a fictional story of a lingering spirit that haunts someone. The song received generally positive reviews. It was commercially successful, peaking within the top ten in over ten countries. It charted at number seven on the US Billboard Hot 100 and topped the charts in Canada, Greece and Portugal. The single was certified Platinum in the United States, Australia, Denmark, Italy, New Zealand, and the United Kingdom. In 2005, it received a nomination for Best Pop Performance by a Duo or Group with Vocals at the 47th Grammy Awards. The music video directed by David Mould was filmed in black-and-white in the Gothic Quarter in Barcelona. The video was nominated for the MTV Video Music Award for Best Rock Video.

== Composition and lyrics ==
The song's lyrics were originally written by Moody about a fictional topic and the music written by Lee on piano when they were 15, after which Lee added the bridge. The lyrics refer to a spirit that haunts the memory of a grieving loved one, according to MTV. Lee considered it Moody's song as he wrote the lyrics. She contributed "a little bit" to the lyrics, but does not connect with the song as it does not have personal meaning to her. The earliest known demo of the song was a home-recording by Lee and Moody that solely featured Lee's vocals and piano and slightly different lyrics. It was intended to be included on their 1998 Evanescence EP but was cut before the EP's release. The song was re-recorded for their 2000 demo album, Origin. A version of the song is also featured on the 2003 EP, Mystary.

"My Immortal" is a piano power ballad. John Bean of The Providence Journal called it a "gothic ballad", while Michael Clark of the Houston Chronicle viewed it as "goth-meets-pop." Jim Kiest of San Antonio Express-News labeled the song an "alt-rock hit", and MTV described it as a "delicate, heartfelt ballad". A writer for IGN said "My Immortal" is thematically a song of pain and despair". According to Rolling Stone, Lee's vocals on the album song are accompanied by a simple piano and some "symphonic dressings". According to the sheet music published by Alfred Music Publishing on the website Musicnotes.com, the song is set in common time and performed in slow and free tempo of 80 beats per minute in the key of A major (F-sharp minor for the chorus). Lee's vocal range for the song runs from the low musical note of A_{3} to the high note of C♯_{5}.

== Recording ==
"My Immortal"
A 26-second sample of the chorus of "My Immortal", a piano ballad

The demo that Evanescence used on their 2000 demo CD was recorded at the radio station where Lee's father worked, after it was empty late at night. This recording, comprising a MIDI keyboard and Lee's demo vocal performance as a teen, is the version used on Fallen per the label's demand, to Lee's displeasure. The label's head of A&R had said in an interview with HitQuarters that when she heard the song she "knew it was a hit". Lee said that the label was "in love" with the song and, although Evanescence had other songs for the album, label executives had "listened to it too many times and they couldn't let it go so they had to put it on the album". She added:

"It's really hard for me to listen to the album version because we did it two years ago — it was just me and guitarist Ben, and I've grown so much as a performer since then ... It's not even a real piano. And the sound quality is bad because we had to break into the studio to record it late at night when no one was around because we couldn't afford a real session."

Lee later said she also dislikes it because she "sounds like a little kid" and the album version does not use David Campbell's orchestration. When "My Immortal" became a single, Lee and Moody chose the recording they had made for Fallen that the label originally rejected. This recording is dubbed the "band version", featuring guitar, drums and bass after the bridge and during the final chorus of the song, as well as Campbell's orchestration. It is the version used on the song's music video and for radio. The later pressings of Fallen contain the single version (or "band version") of "My Immortal" as a hidden track. Moody is credited on the album with producing the song, while on the single's CD Dave Fortman and Moody are credited with production on both the album version and "band version" of the song. The added strings on the album version were arranged by Graeme Revell for the Daredevil soundtrack.

== Critical reception ==
"My Immortal" received generally positive reviews. Kirk Miller of Rolling Stone said that the song "lets Lee wail about her personal demons over simple piano and some symphonic dressings". Richard Harrington of The Washington Post called it a "majestic" song. Blair R. Fischer from MTV News described "My Immortal" as a "delicate, heartfelt ballad". Reviewing a live show, IGN's Ed Thompson regarded it "one of the first and best songs Evanescence ever wrote". Blair R. Fischer of Chicago Tribune said that Lee sounds "simply heavenly on the aberrant, elegant strings-soaked ballad". Jordan Reimer of The Daily Princetonian found a "haunting beauty" in the song. Writing for The Guardian, Tom Reynolds deemed "My Immortal" a "whimpering post-breakup tune" and "overwrought", listing it as one of his top 25 "miserable" tracks.

In 2005, the song received a Grammy Award nomination for Best Pop Performance by a Duo or Group with Vocals. "My Immortal" has been considered by some media outlets as one of Evanescence's best songs, with Loudwire and Kerrang ranking it in the top five of their lists of best Evanescence songs.

== Chart performance ==
"My Immortal" peaked within the top 20 of over 10 countries. On the chart issue dated April 10, 2004, the song peaked at number seven on the Billboard Hot 100, and at number two on the Pop Songs chart on March 27, 2004. It also reached number 19 on the Adult Contemporary chart, and topped Billboard's Adult Pop Songs chart. On the Billboard Radio Songs chart, the song peaked at number seven on April 10, 2004. "My Immortal" was certified Platinum by the Recording Industry Association of America (RIAA) on January 31, 2019, for selling more than 1,000,000 copies in the United States. Its single release also helped Fallen move from number nine to number three on the Billboard 200 chart, selling another 69,000 copies. Nielsen Broadcast Data Systems placed the song at number six on the list of most played radio songs in 2004 with 317,577 spins.

Internationally, the song topped the charts of Canada, Greece, and Portugal. On the Australian Singles Chart, it debuted at number four on January 25, 2004, peaking at that position for three weeks. The next eight weeks, it remained in the top ten of the chart, and it last appeared at number 44 for the week of June 13, 2004. The single was certified platinum by the Australian Recording Industry Association (ARIA) for shipment of 70,000 copies in that country. On New Zealand's RIANZ chart, the song debuted at number 49 on December 19, 2003. On January 25, it climbed from number 34 to number seven. It fell to number eight the next week, then rose up to number two on February 8, blocked from the top position by Baby Bash's "Suga Suga". The next week, it fell to number nine, then spent three more non-consecutive weeks in the top ten. May 10 was its last week inside the top 50, appearing at number 32.

On December 14, 2003, "My Immortal" debuted at number seven on the UK Singles Chart which later also became its peak position. On February 15, 2004 the song dropped out of the top 100. It later re-entered at number 84 on July 13, 2008. After spending several weeks on different positions on the UK Rock Chart, on August 21, 2011, it peaked at number one. The next week, "My Immortal" moved to number two after being replaced by the band's single "What You Want" (2011); a week later, it returned to number one on the chart. The song re-entered the UK Singles Chart at number 81 on August 21, 2011 and at number 89 on October 16, 2011. It also charted for six weeks on Ireland's IRMA chart, peaking at number 20.

== Music video ==
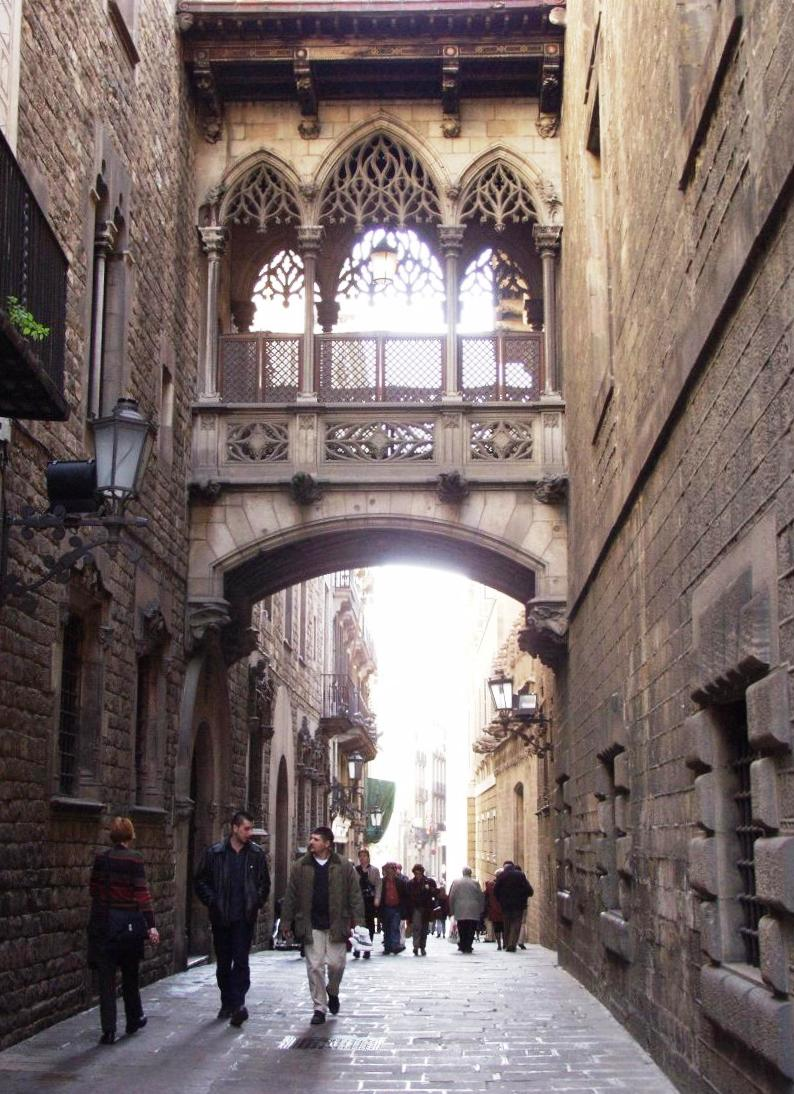
The music video for "My Immortal" was filmed in Barri Gòtic, Barcelona.

The music video, directed by David Mould, was filmed in black-and-white in Plaça de Sant Felip Neri, Gothic Quarter, Barcelona, on October 10, 2003. Lee said they filmed it in an "old area of town", with some of footage from a "scenic point, and there was a rooftop where you could see Barcelona below."

Lee said the video "is all about separation" and she wanted it "to depict real human sadness." The video was filmed two weeks before Moody's departure from the band. Lee admitted that the video's visuals were conspicuous in retrospect but the similarities between that and Moody's departure was coincidental.

According to Jon Wiederhorn from MTV News, the shots of the video are "evocative and artistic, resembling a cross between a foreign film and a Chanel advertisement." Joe D'Angelo of MTV News said that Lee's disconnection in the video shows a "distressed and emotionally wrought heroine." Rob Sheffield of Rolling Stone praised the video saying that Lee looked like a "teen-misery titan" and that she "tiptoed through a marble castle of pain". The music video received an MTV Video Music Award nomination for Best Rock Video at the 2004 MTV Video Music Awards.

== Live performances ==
Evanescence performed the song on the Late Show with David Letterman in March 2004, and at the 2004 Billboard Music Awards in December 2004. A live performance of the song from their Le Zénith, Paris show is featured on their concert CD/DVD, Anywhere but Home (2004). Evanescence performed the song on their 2011 Rock in Rio festival show on October 2, 2011.

== Usage in media ==
"My Immortal" was featured on the soundtrack of the film Daredevil (2003) along with "Bring Me to Life". The song has been used in several television episodes. In 2003, it was featured in the Smallville season three episode "Memoria". Lucy Walsh, a contestant of the 2008 show Rock the Cradle, covered the song in the fifth episode "Judge's Picks". In 2012, Dancer Hampton Williams performed to this song during his audition for the season 9 premiere of So You Think You Can Dance. In the show's eleventh season, the song accompanied a performance by the top seven women, choreographed by Mandy Moore. In 2023, it was featured in the Twisted Metal season one episode "EV3L1N".

== Personnel ==
Credits are adapted from the liner notes of Fallen.

- Amy Lee – vocals, keyboards
- Ben Moody – guitar, production
- David Hodges – keyboards (album version)
- Graeme Revell – string arrangements (album version)
- David Campbell – string arrangements (band version)
- Dave Fortman – production, mixing

== Track listings ==
- CD single (released December 8, 2003)
1. "My Immortal" (band version) – 4:33
2. "My Immortal" (album version) – 4:24
- CD maxi-single (released December 8, 2003)
1. "My Immortal" (band version) – 4:33
2. "My Immortal" (album version) – 4:24
3. "Haunted" (Live from Sessions@AOL) – 3:08
4. "My Immortal" (Live from Cologne) – 4:15

== Charts ==
=== Weekly charts ===
Weekly chart performance for "My Immortal"
Chart (2003–2004)	Peak position
Australia (ARIA)	4
Austria (Ö3 Austria Top 40)	11
Belgium (Ultratop 50 Flanders)	5
Belgium (Ultratop 50 Wallonia)	9
Canada (Billboard)	1
Canada AC Top 30 (Radio & Records)	15
Canada CHR (Nielsen BDS)	3
Canada Hot AC Top 30 (Radio & Records)	2
Colombia (Notimex)	3
Czech Republic (IFPI)	8
Denmark (Tracklisten)	7
Europe (Eurochart Hot 100)	9
Finland (Suomen virallinen lista)	9
France (SNEP)	11
Germany (GfK)	5
Greece (IFPI)	1
Hungary (Single Top 40)	6
Ireland (IRMA)	20
Italy (FIMI)	3
Netherlands (Dutch Top 40)	5
Netherlands (Single Top 100)	7
New Zealand (Recorded Music NZ)	2
Norway (VG-lista)	2
Poland (Polish Airplay Charts)	9
Portugal (AFP)	1
Romania (Romanian Top 100)	83
Scottish Singles Sales (Official Charts)	9
Spain (Promusicae)	4
Sweden (Sverigetopplistan)	9
Switzerland (Schweizer Hitparade)	7
UK Singles (Official Charts)	7
UK Rock & Metal (Official Charts)	1
US Billboard Hot 100	7
US Adult Contemporary (Billboard)	19
US Adult Pop Airplay (Billboard)	1
US Pop Airplay (Billboard)	2

=== Year-end charts ===
Year-end chart performance for "My Immortal"
Chart (2003)	Position
UK Singles (OCC)	185

Chart (2004)	Position
Australia (ARIA)	7
Austria (Ö3 Austria Top 40)	44
Belgium (Ultratop 50 Flanders)	23
Belgium (Ultratop 50 Wallonia)	42
Brazil (Crowley)	19
Germany (Media Control GfK)	42
Italy (FIMI)	7
Netherlands (Dutch Top 40)	26
Netherlands (Single Top 100)	38
New Zealand (RIANZ)	36
Sweden (Hitlistan)	65
Switzerland (Schweizer Hitparade)	30
US Billboard Hot 100	19
US Adult Contemporary (Billboard)	29
US Adult Top 40 (Billboard)	6
US Mainstream Top 40 (Billboard)	8

=== Decade-end charts ===
Decade-end chart performance for "My Immortal"
Chart (2000–2009)	Position
US Adult Top 40 (Billboard)	48

== Certifications ==
Certifications and sales for "My Immortal"
Region	Certification	Certified units/sales
Australia (ARIA)	Platinum	70,000^{^}
Brazil (Pro-Música Brasil)	Gold	30,000^{‡}
Denmark (IFPI Danmark)	Platinum	90,000^{‡}
Germany (BVMI)	Gold	150,000^{‡}
Italy (FIMI)	Platinum	50,000^{‡}
New Zealand (RMNZ)	2× Platinum	60,000^{‡}
Norway (IFPI Norway)	Gold	5,000^{*}
Spain (Promusicae)	Gold	30,000^{‡}
United Kingdom (BPI)	Platinum	1,060,398
United States (RIAA)	Platinum	1,000,000^{‡}
^{*} Sales figures based on certification alone.^{^} Shipments figures based on certification alone.^{‡} Sales+streaming figures based on certification alone.

== Release history ==
Release dates and formats for "My Immortal"
Region	Date	Format(s)	Label(s)	Ref.
United States	November 10, 2003	Contemporary hit; hot AC; mainstream rock; active rock; alternative radio	Wind-up	
United Kingdom	December 8, 2003	CD	Wind-up; Epic	
Australia	January 12, 2004	CD	Wind-up; Epic	
Canada	January 20, 2004	CD	Wind-up; Epic	
Denmark	February 2, 2004	CD	Wind-up; Epic	

== See also ==
- List of Canadian number-one singles of 2004
- Hot Adult Top 40 Tracks number-one hits of 2004
- List of UK Rock Chart number-one singles of 2011
- My Immortal (fan fiction)
