= Bring Me to Life =

2003 song by Evanescence

Single by Evanescence

from the album Fallen
- B-side: "Farther Away"
- Released: January 13, 2003
- Studio: Ocean (Burbank, California)
- Genre: Nu metal; rap rock; alternative rock; gothic metal
- Length: 3:56
- Label: Wind-up
- Songwriters: Amy Lee; Ben Moody; David Hodges
- Producer: Dave Fortman

Evanescence singles chronology
| "Bring Me to Life" (2003) | "Going Under" (2003) |

Music video
- "Bring Me to Life" on YouTube

"Bring Me to Life" is the debut single by American rock band Evanescence from their debut studio album, Fallen (2003). It was released by Wind-up as the album's lead single on January 13, 2003, following its inclusion in the soundtrack of the film Daredevil. The song was written by Amy Lee at age 19 about having been desensitized in an abusive relationship and realizing things she had been missing in life. Guitarist Ben Moody and David Hodges share songwriting credits on the song, which includes guest vocals from Paul McCoy of the band 12 Stones. Produced by Dave Fortman, "Bring Me to Life" is primarily a nu metal and rap rock song. The male vocals were forced by the label against Lee's wishes to market the song in the musical landscape of the time.

The song received a generally positive reception, with critics praising Lee's vocals and melody. One of Evanescence's most commercially successful songs, "Bring Me to Life" charted at number one in Australia, Chile, Colombia, Italy, Scotland, and the rest of the United Kingdom while receiving multi-platinum certifications in Australia, Italy, New Zealand, the United Kingdom, and the United States. It won the Grammy Award for Best Hard Rock Performance and was also nominated for Best Rock Song. Directed by Philipp Stölzl, the music video shows Lee singing and climbing on a skyscraper while having nightmares in her room. The song was reworked and rerecorded on Evanescence's orchestral-electronic fourth studio album, Synthesis (2017).

== Composition and recording ==
Lee wrote "Bring Me to Life" at age 19, after a then-acquaintance (who later became her husband) asked her if she was happy; Lee was in an abusive relationship and in turmoil, and was shocked the person saw through her facade as she felt she "was completely outwardly acting normal". "I felt like he could just see straight into my soul. That inspired the whole song", she explained. The song is about "open-mindedness" and "waking up to all the things you've been missing for so long". After the moment that inspired her to write it, she "realized that for months I'd been numb, just going through the motions of life." In 2022, Lee noted that she was finding her voice lyrically while making the album, realizing "how the more honest I was, the more powerful I felt"; the song was "in a broader way about breaking free from something I knew I had the power to if I was brave enough", and represented "true desires, unspoken frustrations and fears, standing up to the bullshit around me [that] I was just on the cusp of being able to defeat". It expressed a "cry for help", while "Going Under", which she wrote after "Bring Me to Life", was the next stage of her "coming to the realization that I was going to stand up for myself and make a change." Moody and David Hodges share writing credits on the track. According to Josey Scott, the former singer for Saliva, he was originally going to perform the male vocals on song but dropped out due to scheduling conflicts.

With pressure from the label to refine its production, Evanescence ultimately made around 10 demos of the song, which included changing the synths for the opening piano part, and the addition of real strings by David Campbell, an "expense" Lee "fought hard for over a less expensive synthetic alternative". Most of the song was recorded for the Daredevil soundtrack at Ocean Studios in Burbank, California. It was mixed by Jay Baumgardner in his studio, NRG Recording Studios in North Hollywood, on an SSL 9000 J. A 22-piece string section was recorded by Mark Curry in Seattle, and mixed at the Newman Scoring Stage and Bolero Studios in Los Angeles.

"Bring Me to Life" is stylistically a nu metal and rap rock song. In order to market it, the label forced them to add the male rapping vocal, which Lee did not want, or the song and album would not be released. The male vocal was a compromise after the label originally demanded they include a rap on eight of the songs on the album. During an interview, Lee stated: "It was presented to me as, 'You're a girl singing in a rock band, there's nothing else like that out there, nobody's going to listen to you. You need a guy to come in and sing back-up for it to be successful.'" Lee wrote Paul McCoy's part. On the chorus, Lee sings the lines "'Call my name and save me from the dark' over "surging guitars", and McCoy raps the lines "Wake me up/ I can't wake up/ Save me!". The song is set in common time and performed in a moderate tempo of 95 beats per minute. It is written in the key of E minor, and Lee's vocal range for the song runs from the low note of A_{3} to the high note of D_{5}.

Rolling Stone's Kirk Miller said that the song is stylistically a "case of mistaken identity", dooming the band to Linkin Park comparisons "thanks to [its] digital beats, clean metal-guitar riffs, scattered piano lines and all-too-familiar mix of rapping and singing." Blair R. Fischer of MTV called it a "ubiquitous rap-rock confection". Richard Harrington from The Washington Post described its sound as "crunching metallic". Ann Powers from the Los Angeles Times said that "with its lyrical drama and crunchy guitars, [the song] branded the band as overdone nu-metal." "Bring Me to Life" has also been classified as hard rock, alternative rock and a "crossover goth-metal smash". Nick Catucci of The Village Voice wrote that "piano tinkles, Lee's breathless keen, dramatic pauses, guitars like clouds of locusts, [and] McCoy's passing-12-kidney-stones guest vocals" characterize the song, which "sounds like church-burning, brain-eating European dark metal." Vik Bansal of MusicOMH said the track contains "Lee's temptress vocals, pseudo-electronic beats à la Linkin Park, understated but menacing metallic riffs in the background, and a ripping, radio-friendly rock chorus." MTV described it as "an unrelenting paean that begins as hauntingly delicate before piling on crumpled guitar lines and a rap" while "Lee's vocals soar above the whole sludgy mixture".

== Release ==
"Bring Me to Life" first appeared in a scene of the film Daredevil and was included on the film's soundtrack, released in February 2003. The song was released as Fallen's first single on April 7, 2003. Wind-up Entertainment president Ed Vetri revealed that when the label first introduced the song to radio, radio programmers rejected it, saying, "A chick and a piano? Are you kidding? On rock radio?" Some program directors would hear the female voice and piano at the start of the song and turn it off without listening to the rest of the song. A female voice on rock radio was a rarity, and the song was considered for airplay only after there was a male vocal on it. After the song was released on the Daredevil soundtrack, listeners began requesting air play for it, compelling radio stations to reconsider Evanescence.

Lee said that with the success of the single they "went from playing clubs to arenas in a matter of months" and "people in other countries were listening to it". On its international success, she stated:

"Since we released [the song] on Daredevil it went all over the world, whether they wanted it to or not, so we had fans in countries we had never been to because they had the soundtrack and they heard it on the radio. So, it started blowing up all over the world and then we had a reason to tour all over the world. And that's how the whole international thing happened this early."

The single includes "Farther Away" as a B-side. The first pressing of the Australian single contained the track "Missing" as a B-side, but this was omitted from later pressings and later released as a bonus track on the band's first live album, Anywhere but Home. An acoustic version was recorded and released on the "Bring Me to Life" DVD. In 2003, the song served as the official theme song for WWE's 2003 No Way Out event.

== Reception and accolades ==
AllMusic's Johnny Loftus called the song "misleading" due to the vocal duet but "flawless". Kelefa Sanneh of The New York Times said that "Bring Me to Life" "floats like a butterfly, stings like a bee and then hits like a brick." Writing for the Los Angeles Times, Ann Powers wrote that it is a "mix of voluptuous singing and metallic guitar (the latter enhanced by McCoy's rap-rock declamations)". Joe D'Angelo of MTV said the song is an "unrelenting paean that begins as hauntingly delicate before piling on crumpled guitar lines and a rap" and Lee's "vocals soar above the whole sludgy mixture to keep it from sinking into tired mediocrity." Adrien Bengrad from PopMatters called it a "quality single" although hearing it more led him to find it "nothing more than a bombastic distraction from the usual dreck" despite "the refreshing dose of melody". Christopher Gray of The Austin Chronicle deemed it "one of the more curious offerings to be had on the airwaves right now and lingers in the memory like the remnants of a particularly vivid nightmare".

Bryan Reeseman of Mix described "Bring Me to Life" as "grandiose and moody". Nick Catucci of The Village Voice deemed it a "fabulous breakthrough single" that sounds like "church-burning, brain-eating European dark metal." Writing for Kerrang!, Mike Rampton found the "manly rap" forced by their label to be "not good". John Hood of the Miami New Times said it is a "huge, heavy, and mightily histrionic" track that pits Lee's "soaring voice both with and against the rap-infused gruff of McCoy". In his review of Evanescence's second album, Don Kaye of Blabbermouth.net criticized the song for containing "annoying faux-rapping" as a "key component". For NPR, Suzy Exposito wrote that McCoy "came in to insulate chauvinistic rock listeners from Lee's operatic subjectivity". Melissa Maerz of Spin said that Lee thematically tackles death on the song with "grandeur". Rolling Stone called it "haunting, moody and cinematic".

"Bring Me to Life" won the Grammy Award for Best Hard Rock Performance at the 46th Grammy Awards, where it was also nominated in the category Best Rock Song. At the 2003 MTV Video Music Awards the band was nominated in the category for Best New Artist for "Bring Me to Life". The song received a nomination at the 2003 MTV Europe Music Awards for Best Song. At the 14th annual Billboard Music Awards, it won the award for Soundtrack Single of the Year. "Bring Me to Life" ranked number 69 on VH1's 100 Greatest Songs of the 2000s. In 2018, NPR named it one of the 200 greatest songs by 21st century women. In 2023, Rolling Stone ranked the song at number 43 on their "100 Greatest Heavy Metal Songs of All Time" list.

== Chart performance ==
"Bring Me to Life" peaked within the top 10 of more than 15 countries, and within the top 20 of several other countries, making it the band's most successful single to date. It was certified eleven-times platinum in 2026 for selling more than eleven million copies in the United States. It topped the Billboard Modern Rock Tracks and Pop 100 charts and peaked at number five on the Billboard Hot 100, becoming both Evanescence’s and McCoy’s first top 10 hit on the chart. It also peaked at number four on the Adult Top 40 chart. The song initially peaked within the Christian rock charts as well, because its lyrics were interpreted as a call for new life in Jesus Christ by several listeners. "Bring Me to Life" charted at number 73 on Billboard's Best of the 2000s Rock Songs Chart, the only song by a female-led band on that chart. The song topped the charts of Australia, Belgium, Italy and the United Kingdom. It peaked within the top 5 of Austria, Canada, France, Ireland, Germany, New Zealand, Norway, Netherlands, and Sweden. On the ARIA Singles Chart, "Bring Me to Life" peaked at number one where it stayed for six weeks.

"Bring Me to Life" charted within the top 20 of every other country of its release. In the United Kingdom, the song spent four weeks at the top of the UK Singles Chart, which in turn helped Fallen peak at the top of the UK Albums Chart. The song also topped the Eurochart Hot 100 ranking. On June 4, 2011, the song returned to the top of the UK Rock & Metal Singles Chart, eight years after its original release, remaining at number one for two weeks, on June 11, 2011, to June 25, 2011. It fell to number two, remaining there for three weeks, and on July 17, 2011, "Bring Me to Life" returned to number one again and remained there for three weeks. The song remained within the top 10 into October 2011. As of June 2018, the song has sold more than 745,000 copies in the United Kingdom.

== Music video ==
The music video for "Bring Me to Life" was directed by Philipp Stölzl and was filmed in Romania and according to Amy Lee took around 17 hours to shoot. Stölzl stated:

On the one hand, it brings out the most catchy part of the song, the bridge, the duet with the male and female vocals. On the other hand, it reflects the ['Daredevil'] soundtrack background of the song. I did not know if I would have to use a stunt double for most of the angles, which would have restricted me a lot, but then it turned out that Amy did everything herself, hanging on Paul's arm for hours without getting tired. In the end, she is the one who made that shot strong."

According to Joe D'Angelo of MTV News, Lee's "teetering on a ledge" in the video shows a "distressed and emotionally wrought heroine." Ann Powers from the Los Angeles Times wrote: "You might not immediately recognize Amy Lee's name, but you would know her if she plummeted past you from the top floor of a tenement building." Corey Moss of MTV felt that "as intense as a superhero movie, the sequence also gives a nice visual to the song's most memorable lyric, 'Save me.'" John Hood of Miami New Times wrote that the video's "gothopolis backdrop" would "make Tim Burton green with envy".

The music video peaked at number nine on MTV's Total Request Live in April 2003. It was nominated at the 2003 MTV Video Music Awards for Best Rock Video, but lost to Linkin Park's "Somewhere I Belong". On February 1, 2022, it surpassed 1 billion views on YouTube, becoming the first Evanescence music video to reach this milestone.

== Live performances ==
A live performance from the Fallen tour filmed at Le Zénith in Paris is included on Evanescence's first live album and concert DVD Anywhere but Home (2004). The live recording contains a piano and vocal solo before the song's intro. McCoy's studio vocals were performed by tour guitarist John LeCompt during the tour.

In October 2011, the band performed the song at the Rock in Rio festival. Lee performed the song with Japanese band Wagakki Band in February 2020, at Osaka-jō Hall in Osaka, Japan. Evanescence performed the song live with singer Sonny Sandoval in September 2022, and at Rock am Ring festival with guest singer Jacoby Shaddix in June 2023.

== 2017 Synthesis arrangement ==
"Bring Me to Life"

Promotional single by Evanescence

from the album Synthesis
- Released: August 18, 2017
- Genre: Orchestral; electronica
- Length: 4:18
- Label: BMG
- Songwriters: Amy Lee; Ben Moody; David Hodges
- Producers: Will Hunt (Spaceway); Amy Lee

Audio video
- "Bring Me to Life" on YouTube

In 2017, an orchestral and electronic version of the song was recorded for the band's fourth studio album Synthesis. It was made available for digital download and streaming on August 18, 2017; it was also made available for instant download for concertgoers of the band's Synthesis Tour. The Synthesis version of "Bring Me to Life" replaces the drums and guitar from the Fallen version with string arrangements accompanied by crashing cymbals, "tension-building" timpani drums and various electronic elements throughout. It also removes McCoy's vocal feature. Several critics described its new arrangement as "dramatic", with Billboard's Sadie Bell deeming it "just as rich" as the original and Rolling Stone's Brittany Spanos calling it a "cinematic take". Lee described the song as "new" to her again as she incorporated musical elements and vocals which she had "heard in [her] head" since its release.

== Personnel ==
Personnel are adapted from the Fallen liner notes.

- Amy Lee – vocals, keyboards
- Ben Moody – guitar
- David Hodges – keyboards
- Josh Freese – drums
- Francesco DiCosmo – bass guitar
- David Campbell – string arrangements
- Paul McCoy – guest vocals
- Dave Fortman – producing
- Jay Baumgardner – mixing
- Jeremy Parker – engineering

== Track listings ==
- European CD single
1. "Bring Me to Life" – 3:56
2. "Bring Me to Life" (Bliss Mix) – 3:59
- European CD maxi-single
1. "Bring Me to Life" – 3:56
2. "Bring Me to Life" (Bliss Mix) – 3:59
3. "Farther Away" – 3:58
4. "Bring Me to Life" (music video) – 4:14
- Australian CD maxi-single
1. "Bring Me to Life" – 3:56
2. "Bring Me to Life" (Bliss Mix) – 3:59
3. "Farther Away" – 3:58
4. "Missing" – 4:15
- French CD single
1. "Bring Me to Life" – 3:56
2. "Bring Me to Life" (Bliss Mix) – 3:59
- Subsequent pressings single
1. "Bring Me to Life" – 3:56
2. "Bring Me to Life" (Bliss Mix) – 3:59
3. "Farther Away" – 3:58
4. "Bring Me to Life" (music video) – 4:14
- International DVD
1. "Bring Me to Life" (video)
2. "Bring Me to Life"
3. "Bring Me to Life" (live acoustic version)
4. "My Immortal" (Live acoustic version)
5. Interview footage
- UK cassette single
1. "Bring Me to Life" – 3:56
2. "Farther Away" – 3:58
3. "Bring Me to Life" (Bliss Mix) – 3:59

== Charts ==
=== Weekly charts ===
2003 weekly chart performance for "Bring Me to Life"
| Chart (2003) | Peak position |
|---|---|
| Australia (ARIA) | 1 |
| Austria (Ö3 Austria Top 40) | 3 |
| Belgium (Ultratop 50 Flanders) | 7 |
| Belgium (Ultratop 50 Wallonia) | 2 |
| Canada (Nielsen SoundScan) | 3 |
| Canada CHR (Nielsen BDS) | 1 |
| Chile (Notimex) | 1 |
| Colombia (Notimex) | 1 |
| Croatia (HRT) | 6 |
| Denmark (Tracklisten) | 2 |
| Europe (Eurochart Hot 100) | 1 |
| Finland (Suomen virallinen lista) | 11 |
| France (SNEP) | 5 |
| Germany (GfK) | 2 |
| Greece (IFPI Greece) | 3 |
| Hungary (Single Top 40) | 6 |
| Ireland (IRMA) | 2 |
| Italy (FIMI) | 1 |
| Netherlands (Dutch Top 40) | 6 |
| Netherlands (Single Top 100) | 10 |
| New Zealand (Recorded Music NZ) | 3 |
| Norway (VG-lista) | 2 |
| Poland (Polish Airplay Charts) | 4 |
| Romania (Romanian Top 100) | 11 |
| Scottish Singles Sales (Official Charts) | 1 |
| Spain (Promusicae) | 11 |
| Sweden (Sverigetopplistan) | 2 |
| Switzerland (Schweizer Hitparade) | 6 |
| UK Singles (Official Charts) | 1 |
| UK Airplay (Music Week) | 5 |
| UK Rock & Metal (Official Charts) | 1 |
| US Billboard Hot 100 | 5 |
| US Adult Pop Airplay (Billboard) | 4 |
| US Alternative Airplay (Billboard) | 1 |
| US Mainstream Rock Airplay (Billboard) | 11 |
| US Pop Airplay (Billboard) | 1 |

2021–2026 weekly chart performance for "Bring Me to Life"
| Chart (2021–2026) | Peak position |
|---|---|
| Canada Digital Songs (Billboard) | 1 |
| Global 200 (Billboard) | 70 |
| Greece International (IFPI) | 26 |
| Portugal (AFP) | 88 |
| US Hot Rock & Alternative Songs (Billboard) | 21 |

=== Year-end charts ===
Year-end chart performance for "Bring Me to Life"
| Chart (2003) | Position |
|---|---|
| Australia (ARIA) | 6 |
| Australian Rock (ARIA) | 1 |
| Austria (Ö3 Austria Top 40) | 22 |
| Belgium (Ultratop 50 Flanders) | 30 |
| Belgium (Ultratop 50 Wallonia) | 11 |
| Brazil (Crowley) | 12 |
| Europe (Eurochart Hot 100) | 5 |
| France (SNEP) | 18 |
| Germany (Media Control GfK) | 11 |
| Ireland (IRMA) | 20 |
| Italy (FIMI) | 3 |
| Netherlands (Dutch Top 40) | 52 |
| Netherlands (Single Top 100) | 72 |
| New Zealand (RIANZ) | 22 |
| Romania (Romanian Top 100) | 79 |
| Sweden (Hitlistan) | 5 |
| Switzerland (Schweizer Hitparade) | 13 |
| UK Singles (OCC) | 11 |
| UK Airplay (Music Week) | 23 |
| US Billboard Hot 100 | 10 |
| US Adult Top 40 (Billboard) | 12 |
| US Mainstream Rock Tracks (Billboard) | 39 |
| US Mainstream Top 40 (Billboard) | 3 |
| US Modern Rock Tracks (Billboard) | 8 |

2025 year-end chart performance for "Bring Me to Life"
| Chart (2025) | Position |
|---|---|
| Global 200 (Billboard) | 195 |

=== Decade-end charts ===
Decade-end chart performance for "Bring Me to Life"
| Chart (2000–2009) | Position |
|---|---|
| Australia (ARIA) | 59 |
| US Alternative Songs (Billboard) | 26 |
| US Rock Songs (Billboard) | 73 |

== Certifications and sales ==
Certifications and sales for "Bring Me to Life"
| Region | Certification | Certified units/sales |
|---|---|---|
| Australia (ARIA) | 2× Platinum | 140,000^{^} |
| Belgium (BRMA) | Gold | 25,000^{*} |
| Brazil (Pro-Música Brasil) | Platinum | 60,000^{‡} |
| Canada (Music Canada) | Diamond | 800,000^{‡} |
| Denmark (IFPI Danmark) | Gold | 4,000^{^} |
| France (SNEP) | Gold | 315,000 |
| Germany (BVMI) | 3× Gold | 900,000^{‡} |
| Greece (IFPI Greece) | Gold | 10,000^{^} |
| Italy (FIMI) | 2× Platinum | 200,000^{‡} |
| New Zealand (RMNZ) | 5× Platinum | 150,000^{‡} |
| Norway (IFPI Norway) | Platinum | 10,000^{*} |
| Portugal (AFP) | 3× Platinum | 75,000^{‡} |
| Spain (Promusicae) | Platinum | 60,000^{‡} |
| Sweden (GLF) | Gold | 15,000^{^} |
| Switzerland (IFPI Switzerland) | Gold | 20,000^{^} |
| United Kingdom (BPI) | 4× Platinum | 2,583,856 |
| United States (RIAA) | 11× Platinum | 11,000,000^{‡} |
Streaming
| Greece (IFPI Greece) | 2× Platinum | 4,000,000^{†} |
^{*} Sales figures based on certification alone.^{^} Shipments figures based on certification alone.^{‡} Sales+streaming figures based on certification alone.^{†} Streaming-only figures based on certification alone.

== Release history ==
Release dates and formats for "Bring Me to Life"
| Region | Date | Format(s) | Label(s) | Ref. |
|---|---|---|---|---|
| United States | January 13, 2003 | Alternative radio | Wind-up | |
| United States | March 24, 2003 | Hot adult contemporary; contemporary hit radio | Wind-up | |
| Europe | April 7, 2003 | CD | Wind-up; Epic | |
| Europe | April 14, 2003 | Maxi-CD | Wind-up; Epic | |
| Australia | April 21, 2003 | CD | Wind-up; Epic | |
| Denmark | April 28, 2003 | CD | Wind-up; Epic | |
| United Kingdom | June 2, 2003 | CD; DVD; cassette | Wind-up | |

== Cover versions ==
Welsh singer Katherine Jenkins recorded a cover version of "Bring Me to Life" for her 2009 album Believe. It was released as the album's second single in October 2009.

In April 2026, artist DOMI released a techno-pop cover version of "Bring Me to Life", accompanied by an official music video, for the upcoming 2026 album.

== In popular culture ==
The song plays a key role in the 3rd and 6th episodes of the second season of the HBO comedy series The Rehearsal.

On May 29, 2025, "Bring Me to Life" was used as the official trailer song for the video game Elden Ring: Nightreign.

== See also ==
- List of Billboard Alternative Songs number ones of the 2000s
- List of Billboard Mainstream Top 40 number-one songs of 2003
- List of number-one hits of 2003 (Italy)
- List of number-one singles of 2003 (Australia)
- List of UK Rock & Metal Singles Chart number ones of 2003
- List of UK Rock & Metal Singles Chart number ones of 2011
- List of UK singles chart number ones of the 2000s
