= Intrust Bank Arena =

Multi-purpose arena in Wichita, Kansas

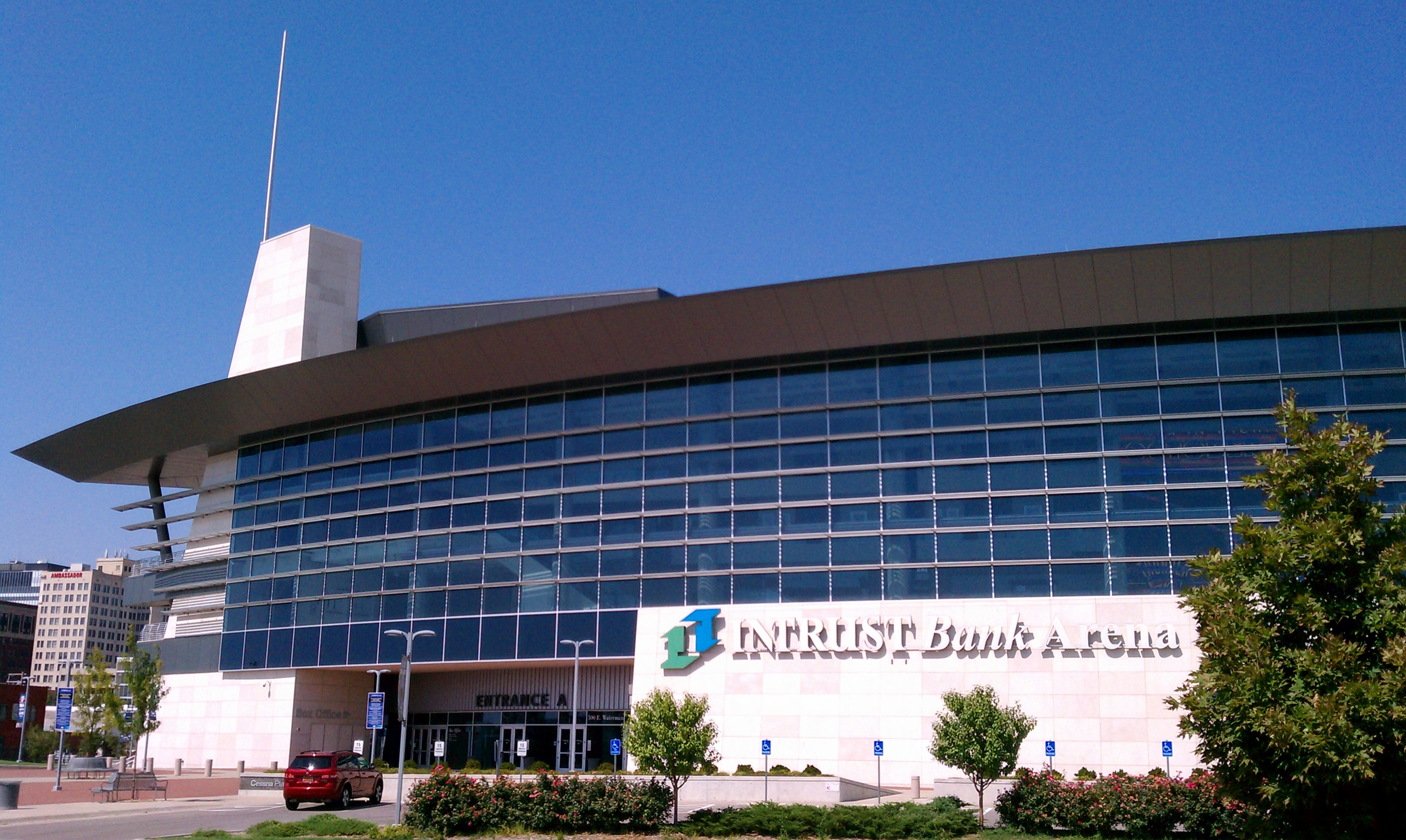
- Interactive map of Intrust Bank Arena
- Address: 500 East Waterman Street
- Location: Wichita, Kansas, U.S.
- Coordinates: 37°40′59″N 97°19′53″W
- Owner: Sedgwick County
- Operator: SMG (2010–2019)
- Capacity: Concerts: 15,750 (center stage); 10,100 (end stage); Basketball: 15,004; Ice Hockey: 13,450
- Surface: Multi-surface
- Record attendance: 16,172 (August 27, 2023; Concert by Zach Bryan)
- Field size: 32,000 sq ft (3,000 m^{2})

Construction
- Groundbreaking: December 4, 2007
- Opened: January 2, 2010
- Cost: $205.5 million ($303 million in 2025 dollars)
- Architects: Arena Design Consortium (HOK Sport, WDM Architects, Gossen Livingston Architects, McCluggage Van Sickle & Perry)
- Project manager: DIO Facilities Project Services
- Structural engineer: Walter P Moore
- Services engineers: M-E Engineers, Inc.
- General contractor: Hunt/Dondlinger

Tenants
- Wichita Thunder (ECHL) (2010–present); Wichita Force (CIF) (2015–2019)

Website
- intrustbankarena.com

Intrust Bank Arena is a 15,004-seat multi-purpose arena in Wichita, Kansas, United States. It is located on the northeast corner of Emporia and Waterman streets in downtown Wichita. It is owned by the government of Sedgwick County. The arena features 22 suites, 2 party suites, and over 300 premium seats. The arena is the second largest indoor arena in the state of Kansas, behind Allen Fieldhouse at KU, which seats 15,300. Locally, it has more seating than Charles Koch Arena at WSU, which seats 10,506.

It is home to the Wichita Thunder ice hockey team and previously to the Wichita Force indoor football team. The Wichita State Shockers men's basketball team uses the arena as an alternate site for games that attract more fans than can be accommodated at its on-campus Charles Koch Arena.

Intrust Bank Arena hosted first and second-round games for the NCAA Division I women's basketball tournament in 2011 and the NCAA Division I men's basketball tournament in 2018, Sweet 16 and Elite 8 games in the 2022 women's tournament, and 1st and 2nd-round games of the men's tournament in 2025. The arena was scheduled to host the 2021 tournament, until the NCAA announced all games would be held at the state of Indiana due to the COVID-19 pandemic. On March 19, 2019, Intrust Bank Arena hosted the first ever UFC event held in Kansas.

== History ==
The facility was known as Sedgwick County Arena during early planning stages, and was meant to replace the Kansas Coliseum located north of Wichita (it opened in 1977 and closed in 2010).

On November 9, 2004, Sedgwick County voters approved the downtown arena at a projected construction cost of $183,625,241 by a 52–48% vote. On April 4, 2005, Governor Kathleen Sebelius signed the Intrust Bank Arena tax bill authorizing Sedgwick County to collect a 1% sales tax beginning July 1, 2005 for 30 months. On January 10, 2008, Sedgwick County announced it had reached a 25-year, $8.75 million naming rights deal with Wichita-based Intrust Bank, the largest bank headquartered in Kansas. This complements a 20-year, $3 million deal with Cessna Aircraft Company to name an adjacent outdoor plaza, and a concourse area deal with Spirit AeroSystems.

It was announced on March 9, 2010, that the Intrust Bank Arena was voted the 'Best Arena' and 'Best Locker Rooms' and also voted third in the 'Best Press Box' category in the Central Hockey League's annual 'Best of the Best' poll. The Intrust Bank Arena cracked Pollstar's Top 50 Arena Venues for ticket sales during the first quarter of 2010. Intrust Bank Arena ranked 22nd in the United States and 45th worldwide. In 2010, net profit was $2,010,736 with depreciation of $4.4 million. In 2011, net profit was $389,659. In 2012, net profit was $703,000. Metallica set the all-time attendance record for a single-concert when it hosted 15,690 fans at the sold-out show on March 4, 2019.

The arena is owned by the government of Sedgwick County.

== Events ==
=== College basketball ===
- December 21, 2010 – Wichita State vs Tulsa
- March 20 & 22, 2011 – 2011 NCAA Division I women's basketball tournament – 1st and 2nd-round games
- November 25, 2011 – Wichita State vs UAB
- December 8, 2011 – Kansas State vs West Virginia
- December 22, 2012 – Wichita State vs Southern Miss
- December 14, 2013 – Wichita State vs Tennessee
- December 21, 2013 – Kansas State vs Gonzaga
- December 6, 2014 – Wichita State vs Saint Louis
- December 12, 2015 – Wichita State vs Utah
- December 19, 2015 – Kansas State vs Colorado State
- December 17, 2016 – Wichita State vs Oklahoma State
- December 16, 2017 – Wichita State vs Oklahoma
- March 15 & 17, 2018 – 2018 NCAA Division I men's basketball tournament – Rounds of 64 and 32
- December 15, 2018 – Wichita State vs Southern Miss
- December 14, 2019 - Wichita State vs Oklahoma
- December 5, 2021 - Wichita State vs Kansas State
- March 25 & 28, 2022 – 2022 NCAA Division I women's basketball tournament – Sweet 16 and Elite 8
- December 17, 2022 - Wichita State vs Oklahoma State
- December 9, 2023 - Wichita State vs South Dakota State
- March 20 & 22, 2025 – 2025 NCAA Division I men's basketball tournament – Rounds of 64 and 32
- March 16 & 17, 2027 – 2027 NCAA Division I men's basketball tournament – Opening round games

=== NBA preseason ===
- October 24, 2012 – Dallas Mavericks vs Oklahoma City Thunder
- October 23, 2013 – Chicago Bulls vs Oklahoma City Thunder
- October 17, 2014 – Toronto Raptors vs Oklahoma City Thunder

=== NHL preseason ===
- September 24, 2022 - St. Louis Blues vs Arizona Coyotes
- September 23, 2023 - St. Louis Blues vs Arizona Coyotes

=== Bull riding ===
- May 7 & 8, 2010 – PBR Built Ford Tough Series: Wichita Invitational
- September 23–24, 2011 – PBR Built Ford Tough Series: DEWALT Guaranteed Tough Invitational
- April 23, 2022 - PBR Pendleton Whisky Velocity Tour
- April 22, 2023 - PBR Pendleton Whisky Velocity Tour

=== Combat sports ===
- April 27, 2013 – VFC Fight Night: Wichita 1 Marcio Navarro vs Jake Lindsey
- March 9, 2019 – UFC Fight Night Wichita Derrick Lewis vs Junior Dos Santos
- April 8, 2022 - Bare Knuckle Fighting Championship 23
- June 12, 2023 - WWE Monday Night Raw
- November 4, 2023 - AEW Collision
- December 9, 2024 - WWE Monday Night Raw

=== Concerts / Shows / Events ===
List of Concerts / Shows / Events

2010

- Brad Paisley & The Drama Kings – January 9, 2010, with Miranda Lambert and Justin Moore
- ROKICT Local Music Night! – January 12, 2010
- George Strait & The Ace in the Hole Band – February 19, 2010, with Reba McEntire and Lee Ann Womack
- Elton John & Billy Joel – March 3, 2010
- Bon Jovi – March 11, 2010, with Dashboard Confessional
- Jeff Dunham – March 12, 2010
- The Winter Jam Tour Spectacular – March 21, 2010
- Taylor Swift – April 1, 2010, with Kellie Pickler and Gloriana
- The Gaither Homecoming – April 30, 2010
- Nickelback – May 14, 2010, with Shinedown, Breaking Benjamin and Sick Puppies
- Star Wars in Concert – May 22, 2010
- Daughtry – May 24, 2010, with Cavo and Lifehouse
- Brooks & Dunn – May 27, 2010, with Jason Aldean and Tyler Dickerson
- Tim McGraw – June 11, 2010, with Lady A and Love and Theft
- Michael Bublé – June 23, 2010, with Naturally 7
- The Eagles – June 30, 2010
- REO Speedwagon – July 13, 2010, with Pat Benatar
- Rascal Flatts – July 22, 2010, with Kellie Pickler and Chris Young
- Celtic Woman – August 7, 2010
- The Dave Matthews Band – August 14, 2010
- Rush – August 20, 2010
- Carrie Underwood – October 19, 2010, with Billy Currington and Sons of Sylvia
- The Zac Brown Band – November 6, 2010, with The Wood Brothers and Casey Driessen
- Dane Cook – November 16, 2010
- The Radio City Christmas Spectacular – November 20, 2010
- The Trans-Siberian Orchestra – December 15, 2010
- Barney Live in Concert – December 18, 2010
- Alegría – December 29, 2010 – January 2, 2011

2011

- Kid Rock & Twisted Brown Trucker – February 1, 2011, with Jamey Johnson and Ty Stone & The Truth
- Sesame Street Live – April 1, 2011
- The Winter Jam Tour Spectacular - February 27, 2011
- Kenny Chesney – April 13, 2011, with Billy Currington and Uncle Kracker
- James Taylor – April 30, 2011
- ZZ Top – May 12, 2011, with Lynyrd Skynyrd
- Avenged Sevenfold – May 14, 2011, with Three Days Grace and Bullet for My Valentine
- Tim McGraw - May 19, 2011, with Luke Bryan and The Band Perry
- Josh Groban – May 21, 2011, with Eric Lewis
- Keith Urban – August 16, 2011, with Jake Owen
- Sugarland – October 8, 2011, with Sara Bareilles
- Reba McEntire – November 5, 2011, with The Band Perry, Steel Magnolia and Edens Edge
- The Rock & Worship Roadshow – November 18, 2011
- The Trans-Siberian Orchestra - December 15, 2011

2012

- Brad Paisley - January 20, 2012, with The Band Perry and Scotty McCreery
- Disney Live – January 26, 2012
- The Winter Jam Tour Spectacular - February 24, 2012
- Jeff Dunham - February 25, 2012
- George Strait & The Ace in the Hole Band - February 18, 2012, with Martina McBride
- Sesame Street Live - March 9, 2012
- Jason Aldean – March 16, 2012, with Luke Bryan and Lauren Alaina
- Miranda Lambert – April 14, 2012, with Chris Young and Jerrod Niemann
- Tom Petty and the Heartbreakers – April 26, 2012, with Regina Spektor
- The Wichita RibFest Concerts – May 17–19, 2012, May 16–18, 2013 and May 16–18, 2014
- Barry Manilow – June 7, 2012
- Nickelback - June 8, 2012, with Bush, Seether and My Darkest Days
- Hillsong United – September 23, 2012
- Carrie Underwood - October 27, 2012, with Hunter Hayes
- Aerosmith – November 11, 2012, with Cheap Trick
- The Trans-Siberian Orchestra - December 5, 2012
- Eric Church – December 8, 2012, with Justin Moore and Kip Moore

2013

- Quidam – January 2–6, 2013
- Rascal Flatts - January 19, 2013
- Kid Rock & Twisted Brown Trucker - February 10, 2013, with Buckcherry and Hellbound Glory
- Three Days Grace – March 23, 2013, with Shinedown and P.O.D.
- The Winter Jam Tour Spectacular - March 29, 2013
- The Gaither Homecoming - April 5, 2013
- The Zac Brown Band - April 20, 2013, with Levi Lowrey and Dugas
- Jason Aldean - May 9, 2013, with Jake Owen and Thomas Rhett
- Taylor Swift - August 6, 2013, with Ed Sheeran and Casey James
- Rascal Flatts - August 9, 2013, with The Band Perry
- Blake Shelton – October 5, 2013, with Easton Corbin and Jana Kramer
- John Mayer – December 1, 2013, with Phillip Phillips
- The Trans-Siberian Orchestra - December 18, 2013

2014

- The Rock & Worship Roadshow - January 25, 2014
- Lady Antebellum – February 14, 2014, with Kip Moore and Kacey Musgraves
- The Winter Jam Tour Spectacular - March 1, 2014
- George Strait & The Ace in the Hole Band - April 4, 2014, with Merle Haggard & The Strangers and Lee Ann Womack
- Styx – May 14, 2014, with Foreigner, Don Felder and Llew Brown
- James Taylor - June 20, 2014
- Mötley Crüe – July 12, 2014, with Alice Cooper and The Raskins
- Five Finger Death Punch – October 20, 2014, with Volbeat, Hellyeah and Nothing More
- Eric Church – December 4, 2014, with Dwight Yoakam and Halestorm
- The Trans-Siberian Orchestra - December 5, 2014

2015

- Varekai – January 14–18, 2015 (7 shows)
- Bob Seger & The Silver Bullet Band – February 17, 2015, with The Heartless Bastards
- The Avett Brothers – February 26, 2015
- The Winter Jam Tour Spectacular - March 6, 2015
- Miranda Lambert - March 7, 2015, with Justin Moore, RaeLynn and Jukebox Mafia
- Fleetwood Mac – On with the Show – March 31, 2015
- Lil Wayne – June 12, 2015 with Ty Dolla Sign, Fetty Wap, Kid Ink, and Trey Songz
- Lady Antebellum – July 25, 2015, with Hunter Hayes and Sam Hunt
- Ariana Grande with Prince Royce – October 6, 2015
- Garth Brooks with Trisha Yearwood – December 3–6, 2015 (6 Sold Out Shows)

2016

- Barry Manilow – February 19, 2016
- The Winter Jam Tour Spectacular - March 10, 2016
- The Dave Matthews Band - May 11, 2016
- Journey - May 23, 2016 with The Doobie Brothers and Dave Mason
- Power 93.5 Powerhouse Jam II with Wiz Khalifa, Yo Gotti, XV, Dreezy, Luke Nasty, and Kevin Gates – June 9, 2016
- Kiss – July 25, 2016
- Blake Shelton - September 22nd, 2016 with RaeLynn
- Carrie Underwood – November 22, 2016

2017

- Red Hot Chili Peppers – January 16, 2017
- Twenty One Pilots – February 3, 2017 with Jon Bellion and Judah & the Lion
- The Winter Jam Tour Spectacular - March 31, 2017
- Eric Church – April 7, 2017
- Neil Diamond – July 14, 2017
- Paul McCartney – July 19, 2017
- Tim McGraw - September 21, 2017 with Brandy Clark
- Foo Fighters – November 13, 2017 with The Struts
- Trans-Siberian Orchestra – December 8, 2017

2018

- Avenged Sevenfold – February 6, 2018 with Bullet for My Valentine and Breaking Benjamin
- Pink – March 3, 2018 with Kidcutup
- The Winter Jam Tour Spectacular - March 9, 2018
- Skillet – March 9, 2018
- James Taylor and His All Star Band - May 24, 2018
- Journey and Def Leppard - July 16, 2018
- Imagine Dragons - July 30, 2018 with Grace Vanderwall
- Sugarland - August 18, 2018
- Lynyrd Skynyrd - September 29, 2018 with The Marshall Tucker Band
- Five Finger Death Punch - November 6, 2018 with Breaking Benjamin and Bad Wolves
- Lindsey Stirling - November 29, 2018

2019

- Luke Combs - February 7, 2019
- The Winter Jam Tour Spectacular - February 8, 2019
- Kelly Clarkson - March 2, 2019
- Metallica - March 4, 2019
- Shinedown - March 19, 2019
- Kenny Chesney - May 3, 2019
- Cardi B - July 24, 2019
- Alan Jackson - August 10, 2019
- Chris Stapleton - August 22, 2019
- Carrie Underwood – September 18, 2019
- Guns N' Roses - October 7, 2019
- Miranda Lambert - October 26, 2019 with Ashley McBryde
- The Chainsmokers - November 16, 2019

2020

- Trolls Live! - January 3–5, 2020
- George Strait & The Ace in the Hole Band - January 24, 2020, with Asleep at the Wheel
- The Winter Jam Tour Spectacular - February 7, 2020
- Kiss - February 19, 2020 with David Lee Roth
- Jason Aldean - February 15, 2020 with Morgan Wallen, Riley Green, and Dee Jay Silver
- Korn - February 16, 2020 with Breaking Benjamin and Bones UK
- Blake Shelton - March 11, 2020
- Arena closed for concerts from March 12, 2020 through June 9, 2021 due to COVID-19 pandemic.

2021

- Disney on Ice - June 10–13, 2021
- The Dude Perfect 2021 Tour - October 2, 2021
- TobyMac - October 9, 2021 with Tauren Wells, Jordan Feliz, We Are Messengers, Ryan Stevenson, Aaron Cole, and Cochren & Co.
- Toby Keith - October 15, 2021 with Matt Stell
- Lil Baby - November 3, 2021 with Moneybagg Yo, 42 Dugg, Mooski, and Morray
- Joe Rogan - December 3, 2021

2022

- Jeff Dunham - January 28, 2022
- The Winter Jam Tour Spectacular - February 10, 2022
- Slipknot - March 19, 2022 with In This Moment and Wage War
- Korn - April 1, 2022 with Chevelle and Code Orange
- Shinedown - April 28, 2022 with The Pretty Reckless and Diamante
- PAW Patrol Live! - May 17-18, 2022
- Brooks & Dunn - May 20, 2022, with Jordan Davis and Jackson Dean
- James Taylor and His All Star Band - July 16, 2022
- Dierks Bentley - August 6, 2022 with Ashley McBryde, Travis Denning and DJ Aydamn
- Morgan Wallen - August 25, 2022 with Hardy and Larry Fleet
- West Fest featuring Ice Cube and Cypress Hill - August 26, 2022 featuring Bone Thugs N Harmony and Ying Yang Twins
- Backstreet Boys - September 13, 2022
- Keith Urban - September 17, 2022 with Ingrid Andress
- Alabama with The Beach Boys - September 25, 2022
- Jason Aldean – October 29, 2022 with Gabby Barrett and John Morgan
- Hillsong United - November 15, 2022 with Chris Tomlin and Taya
- Trans-Siberian Orchestra - November 17, 2022
- Reba McEntire - November 19, 2022 with Terri Clark

2023

- The Winter Jam Tour Spectacular - February 17, 2023
- Monster Jam - February 25-26, 2023
- Disney On Ice - March 23-26, 2023
- Kenny Chesney - March 30, 2023 with Kelsea Ballerini
- Harlem Globetrotters - April 2, 2023
- Journey - April 8, 2023 with Toto
- Kane Brown - April 13, 2023 with Dustin Lynch and LoCash
- Koe Wetzel - April 15, 2023 with The Steel Woods and Red Shahan
- Walker Hayes - May 4, 2023 with Chris Lane and Nicolle Galyon
- Chris Stapleton - June 23, 2023 with Marty Stuart and Allen Stone
- Parker McCollum - July 8, 2023 with Jackson Dean and Tyler Halverson
- Wiz Khalifa and Snoop Dogg with the Ying Yang Twins - July 14th, 2023
- Hot Wheels Monster Trucks Live Glow Party - July 29 - 30, 2023
- Thomas Rhett - August 18, 2023 with Cole Swindell and Nate Smith
- Zach Bryan - August 27, 2023 with Charles Wesley Godwin and JR Carroll
- Lauren Daigle - September 28, 2023
- Cirque du Soleil - November 9 - 12, 2023

== Gallery ==
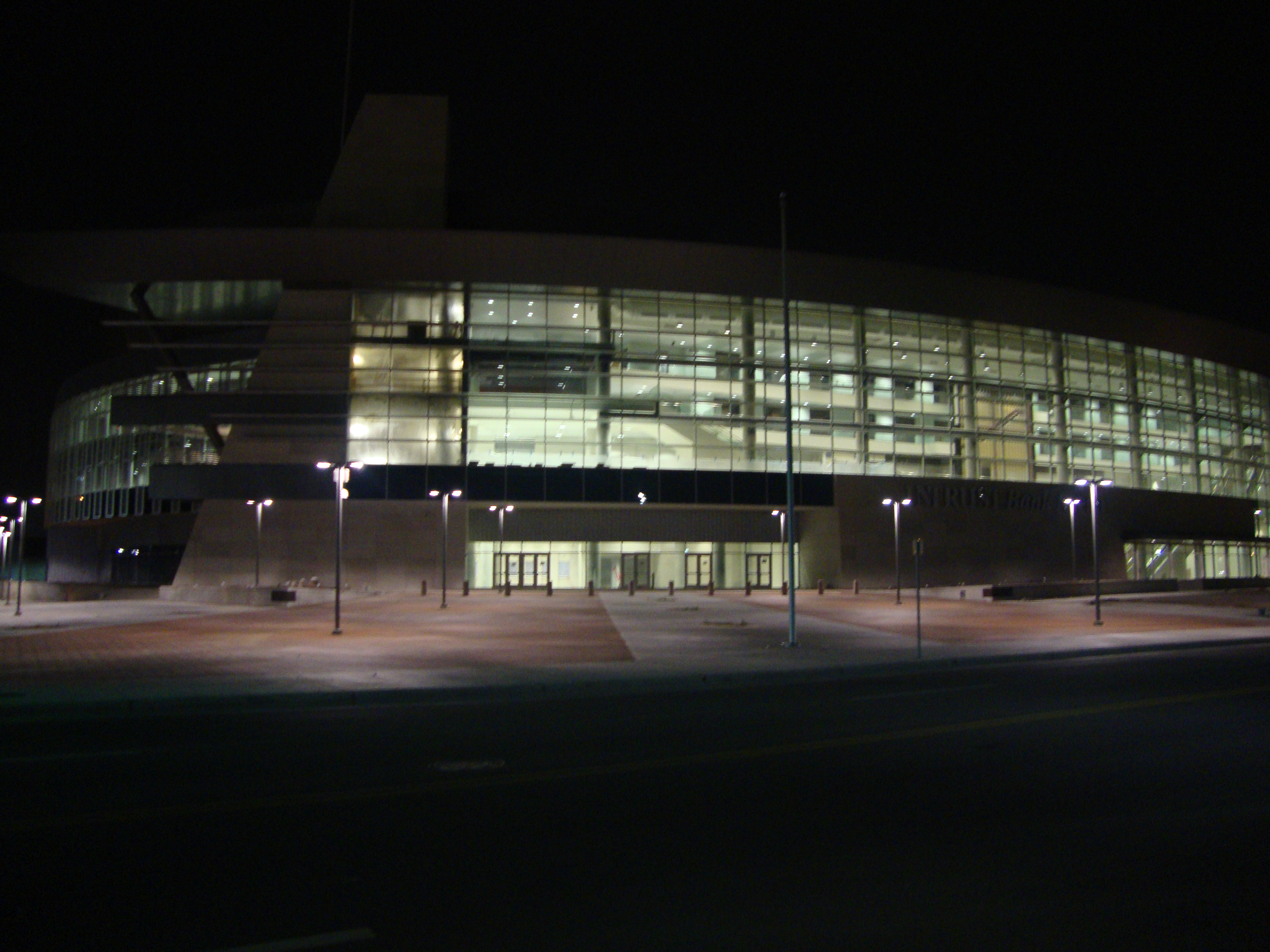
Intrust Bank Arena at night (2009)

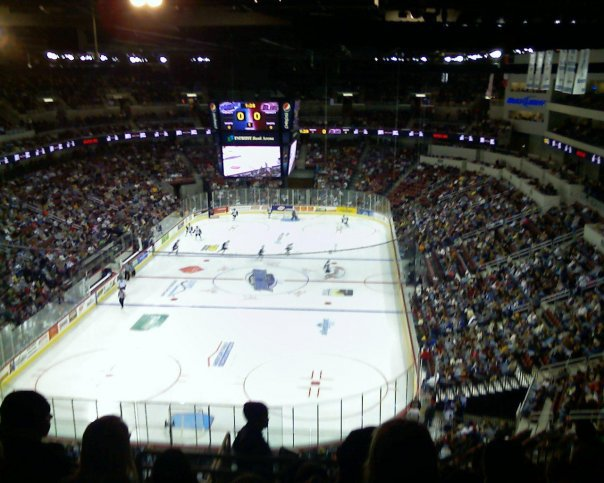
A Wichita Thunder game at Intrust Bank Arena (2010)

== See also ==
- List of NCAA Division I basketball arenas

Preceded by Kansas Coliseum	Home of the Wichita Thunder; 2010–present	Succeeded by current
