= Winter Jam Tour Spectacular =

Annual American Christian music tour

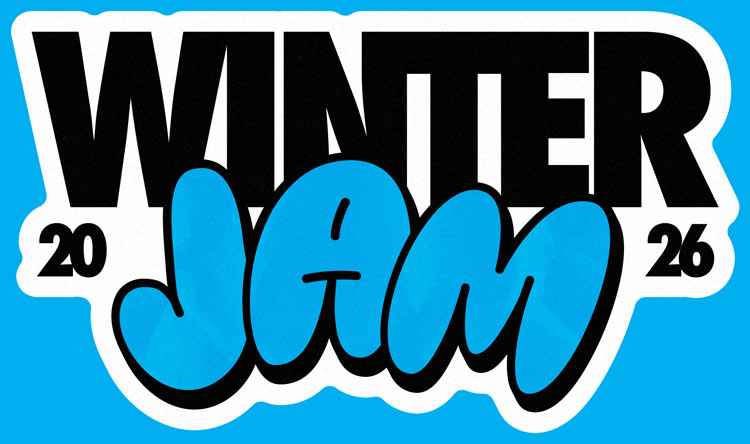
- Nickname: "WinterJam" "WJ" "WJ26"
- Genre: Christian rock, Christian rap, contemporary Christian music
- Dates: January - April (East Coast); November (West Coast)
- Locations: East Coast (1995–present); West Coast (2011–2017; 2023)
- Years active: 1995–present
- Founders: NewSong
- Website: www.jamtour.com

Winter Jam Tour Spectacular, also referred to as simply Winter Jam (and formerly known as January Jam from 1995 to 2000), is an annual American touring music festival featuring contemporary Christian music artists of all genres, stunt and/or comedy performances, as well as a tour speaker. It is the United States' largest annual Christian Music Tour.

Conceived and created in 1995, as "January Jam", by contemporary Christian music group NewSong and produced and promoted by the promotions company, Premier Productions, Winter Jam has run annually since 1995. From its inception in 1995 through the most recent 2026 tour, the Winter Jam Tour Spectacular has toured all over the United States of America. Tickets are not required for the tour, as a $10 general admission is collected at the door of each arena, though this was raised to a $15 suggested donation in 2018. In 2010 the tour was rated the number two tour in the world. As of April 2011, they reported more than half a million in total attendance for the Winter Jam Tour Spectacular 2011, first quarter, attendance, and 90,000 "decisions for Christ" for. The tour outpaced attendance for all other tours in the first quarter of 2011, including Bon Jovi, U2, X Factor Live, Lady Gaga, Brad Paisley and Justin Bieber, according to Pollstar's 2011 Worldwide First Quarter Ticket Sales "Top 100 Tour" chart.

In 2011, Winter Jam started doing the West Coast Tour in November of each year until 2018. The two tours were later combined to have both West Coast and East Coast dates starting in 2023.

== Artist Lineup By Year ==
=== East Coast ===
Year	Artists	Other Performer(s)	Ref.
2001	NewSong; Audio Adrenaline; Whisper Loud; Joy Williams; Pillar		
2002	NewSong; Newsboys; Michelle Tumes; Paige; Brother's Keeper; Phat Chance; Freddie Colloca		
2003	NewSong; Carman; Tait; Plus One; Natalie Grant; Daily Planet; According to John; KJ-52		
2004	NewSong; Audio Adrenaline; Relient K; Todd Agnew; Jadyn Maria; Sonicflood (certain cities)	Brock Gill (illusionist)	
2005	NewSong; tobyMac; Tait; Building 429; Rachael Lampa; Matthew West		
2006	NewSong; Newsboys; ZOEgirl; tobyMac; Hawk Nelson; Krystal Meyers	David Nasser (speaker) Sphere of Fear Motorcycle Stunt Show	
2007	NewSong; Steven Curtis Chapman; Jeremy Camp; Sanctus Real; Hawk Nelson; Britt Nicole	Tony Nolan (speaker) Andre The Hollywood Cowboy "The President" John Morgan	
2008	NewSong; MercyMe; Skillet; BarlowGirl; Mandisa; Group1Crew; pureNRG	Tony Nolan (speaker) Real Encounter's Xtreme BMX Skate Team	
2009	NewSong; tobyMac; Hawk Nelson; Brandon Heath; Francesca Battistelli; Stephanie Smith; pureNRG	Tony Nolan (speaker)	
2010	NewSong; Third Day; Newsboys; Tenth Avenue North; Fireflight; Sidewalk Prophets; Robert Pierre; Revive	Tony Nolan (speaker)	
2011	NewSong; Newsboys; David Crowder Band; Kutless; RED; Francesca Battistelli; KJ-52; Sidewalk Prophets; Chris August; Chris Sligh	Tony Nolan (speaker)	
2012	NewSong; Skillet; Sanctus Real; Peter Furler; Kari Jobe; Building 429; Group1Crew; Dara Maclean; We As Human; For King & Country	Nick Hall (speaker) Brock Gill (illusionist)	
2013	NewSong; tobyMac; Matthew West; RED; Jamie Grace; Royal Tailor; Sidewalk Prophets; Jason Castro; OBB; Capital Kings; Thousand Foot Krutch (certain cities)	Nick Hall (speaker)	
2014	NewSong; Newsboys; Lecrae; Tenth Avenue North; Thousand Foot Krutch; Plumb; Colton Dixon; Love & the Outcome; Everfound; Derek Minor	Nick Hall (speaker)	
2015	NewSong; Skillet; Jeremy Camp; Francesca Battistelli; Building 429; For King & Country; Family Force 5; Blanca; About a Mile; Veridia	Tony Nolan (speaker)	
2016	NewSong; For King & Country; Matthew West; Crowder; RED; Sidewalk Prophets; Lauren Daigle; Trip Lee; Tedashii; KB; Stars Go Dim; We Are Messengers	Tony Nolan (speaker)	
2017	NewSong; Crowder; Britt Nicole; Tenth Avenue North; Andy Mineo; Colton Dixon; Thousand Foot Krutch; OBB; Sarah Reeves; Steven Malcolm	Tony Nolan (speaker) Sadie Robertson	
2018	NewSong; Skillet; Kari Jobe; Building 429; KB; Jordan Feliz; Hollyn; Dan Bremnes; Mallary Hope; Westover	Nick Hall (speaker) John Crist (comedian)	
2019	NewSong; Newsboys United; Danny Gokey; Mandisa; Rend Collective; Ledger; Hollyn; Dan Bremnes; Manic Drive; Ty Brasel	Greg Steir (speaker) Zane Black (speaker)	
2020	NewSong; Crowder; Hillsong Young & Free; Passion; Andy Mineo; Building 429; RED; Austin French; Riley Clemmons; Ballenger; Zauntee	Greg Steir (speaker) Zane Black (speaker) Louie Giglio	
2021	(Weekend Tour): NewSong; Crowder; We The Kingdom; KB; Riley Clemmons; Colton Dixon; JJ Weeks; Apollo LTD		
2022	NewSong; Skillet; Tauren Wells; KB; Colton Dixon; I Am They; Bayside Worship; Abby Robertson	Shane Pruitt (speaker)	
2023	NewSong; We The Kingdom; Jeremy Camp; Andy Mineo; Anne Wilson; Disciple; Austin French; Thrive Worship; RENEE; Sean BE	Zane Black (speaker)	
2024	NewSong; Crowder; Lecrae; Cain; Katy Nichole; Seventh Day Slumber; SEU Worship; John Wesley; Lin D; Hulvey (certain cities)	Zane Black (speaker) Joseph O'Brien	
2025	NewSong; Skillet; Anne Wilson; KB; Colton Dixon; Micah Tyler; SEU Worship; The Band Table; We Are Vessel; Trip Lee (certain cities)	Zane Black (speaker)	
2026	NewSong; Chris Tomlin; Matthew West; Katy Nicole; Hulvey; Disciple; Emerson Day; Jeremy Rosado; Heath Brothers; Cliff Preston; Anne Wilson (certain cities); nobigdyl (certain cities)	Zane Black (speaker)	
2027	NewSong; Crowder; Anne Wilson; Andy Mineo (Feat. Magic & Bird); Strings & Heart; Terrian; RED; Natural State; CJ Emulous; Mary Clair; Bodie (certain cities)	Zane Black (speaker)	

=== West Coast ===
Year	Artists	Other Performer(s)	Ref.
2011	NewSong; Newsboys; Kutless; Matthew West; Red; Fireflight; KJ-52; For King & Country; Dara Maclean; Patrick Ryan Clark	Tony Nolan (speaker)	
2012	NewSong; tobyMac; RED; Sidewalk Prophets; Jamie Grace; Group 1 Crew; Chris August; Jason Castro; Dara Maclean; Capital Kings	Nick Hall (speaker)	
2013	NewSong; Newsboys; Crowder; Passion; Tenth Avenue North; Plumb; Thousand Foot Krutch; Building 429; Love & the Outcome; Everfound; Dara Maclean	Nick Hall (speaker)	
2014	NewSong; Hillsong United; Jeremy Camp; Francesca Battistelli; Colton Dixon; Disciple; Trip Lee; Everfound; About a Mile; Veridia	Tony Nolan (speaker) Jared Emerson	
2015	NewSong; Skillet; For King & Country; Jamie Grace; Lincoln Brewster; Family Force 5; Love & the Outcome; Stars Go Dim; We Are Messengers; OBB	Tony Nolan (speaker) Sadie Robertson	
2016	NewSong; Matthew West; Crowder; Britt Nicole; RED; Mandisa; KB; Tedashii; OBB; Sarah Reeves; Steven Malcolm	Tony Nolan (speaker)	
2017	NewSong; Lecrae; Mac Powell; Building 429; Andy Mineo; Moriah Peters (TRALA); Family Force 5; Westover; Mallary Hope; Dan Bremnes	Nick Hall (speaker)	
2023	NewSong; We The Kingdom; Jeremy Camp; Anne Wilson; Andy Mineo; Disciple; Austin French; Thrive Worship; RENEE; Sean BE	Zane Black (speaker)	
