= Patrick Clark =

Patrick Clark may refer to:

- Velveteen Dream (born 1995), American professional wrestler born Patrick Clark Jr.
- Patrick Clark (bishop) (1908–1954), Canadian bishop
- Patrick Clark (chef) (1955–1998), American chef
- Patrick Ryan Clark (born 1977), American Christian musician
- Pat Clark, English motorcycle speedway rider

== See also ==
- Patrick Clarke (fl. 1990s–2020s), Irish writer, director, producer and actor
- Patrick Clarke (American football) (born 1991), American football placekicker
