= Breslin Student Events Center =

Arena at Michigan State University

Jack Breslin Student Events Center
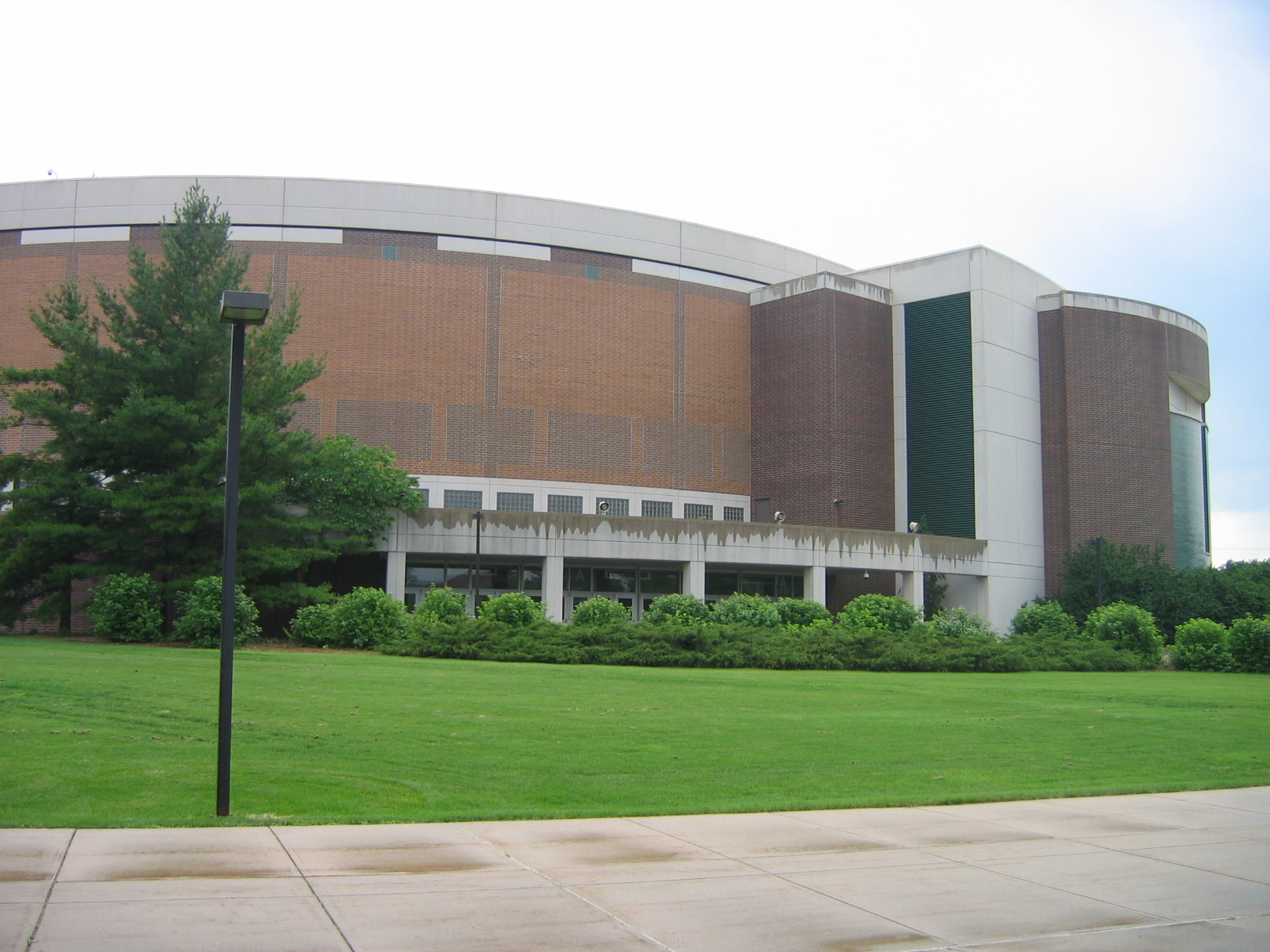
- The Jack Breslin Student Events Center
- Interactive map of Jack Breslin Student Events Center
- Location: 534 Birch Road; East Lansing, MI 48824
- Coordinates: 42.728227°N 84.492396°W
- Capacity: 14,759 (1989-2010); 14,797 (2010-present)
- Surface: Hardwood

Construction
- Groundbreaking: July 24, 1986
- Opened: November 9, 1989
- Cost: $45 million ($117 million in 2025 dollars)
- Architects: HNTB; Giffels, Hoyem, Basso, Inc.
- General contractor: Gilbane/Christman

Tenants
- Michigan State Spartans (men's & women's basketball, volleyball); MHSAA Basketball Finals

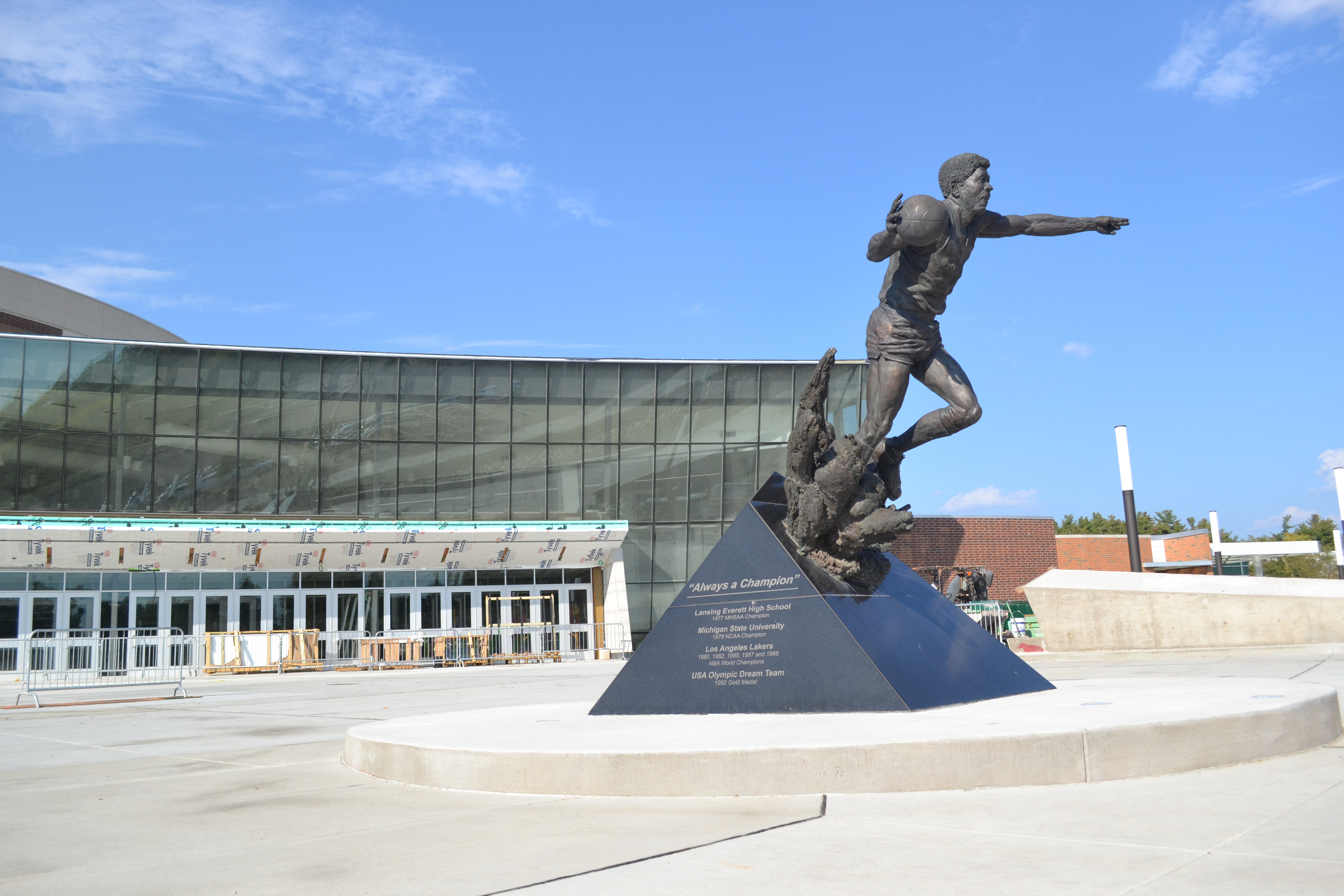
Magic Johnson statue, with the Gilbert Pavilion in the background

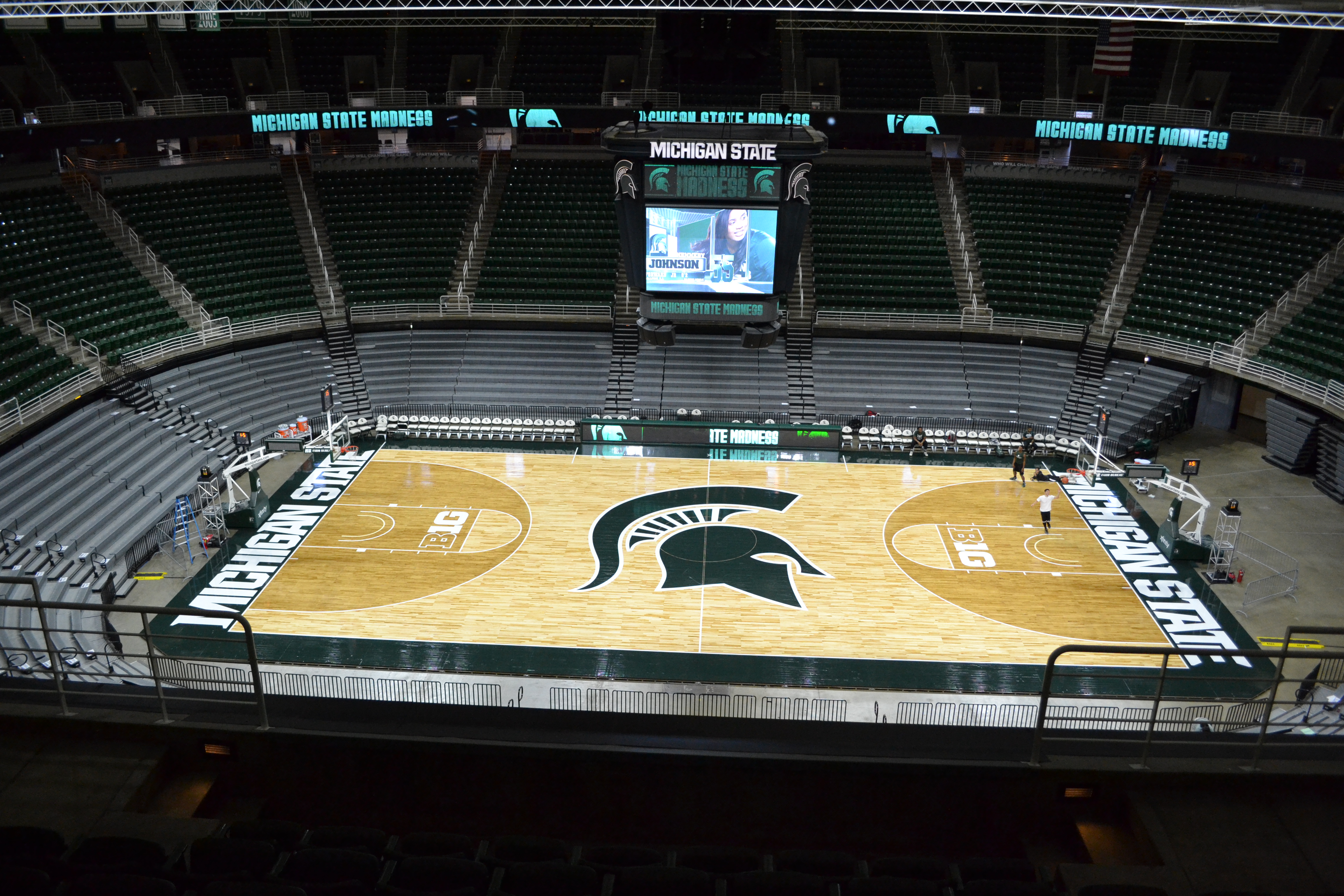
Breslin Center's new court as of 2016

The Jack Breslin Student Events Center is a multi-purpose arena at Michigan State University in East Lansing, Michigan. The arena opened in 1989, and is named for Jack Breslin, MSU alumnus, former athlete and administrator, who first began pushing for the arena in 1969. It is home to the Michigan State Spartans men's and women's basketball teams. Although it nominally contains 16,280 seats, the arena typically holds around 10,000 for most events depending on the floor or stage setup. The Breslin Center superseded Jenison Fieldhouse, which stands approximately 400 feet (120 m) to the northeast, which had served since 1939. In 2022 the women's volleyball team moved its home games from Jenison to the Breslin Center.

The arena's previous basketball court was the same floor where the Spartans won the 2000 NCAA Men's Tournament, which was at the RCA Dome in Indianapolis. The school purchased the floor from the NCAA and Final Four floor installer Horner Flooring after the title game, and had a plaque installed on the baseline near the Michigan State tunnel to commemorate the floor's purpose in the school's history. They updated their court before the 2016–2017 season that has a two-toned finish inside the arcs and a large Spartan Head in the middle.

The building not only serves as the home to MSU sports teams, but as the main large performance arena for the Lansing area. The Michigan State Bar Examination, large concerts, commencements, monster truck rallies, and circuses that travel to Mid Michigan are often held at the Breslin Center. With a large arena, it is Lansing's WWE venue. Many events for Michigan State are held here, including a plethora of career fairs and many Greek Life events.

The arena underwent a $50 million renovation starting in January 2016 that went until October 2017. This renovation changed many things about the Breslin, but the most notable was the addition of the Tom Izzo Basketball Hall of History. This addition includes both men's and women's basketball trophies throughout the years, along with tributes to notable former players, previous jerseys, and even a wax figure of Tom Izzo. Another notable addition, donated by Draymond Green, was a new weight room for the players. Other things included in the renovation were a locker room for former players, a players' lounge, and a recruiting room. The concourse was also widened, and improvements were made to the restrooms and concession stands for the benefit of the fans. Quicken Loans founder, Dan Gilbert, donated $15 million to both the addition and a scholarship fund. They named the outside of the Hall of History the Gilbert Pavilion in his honor.

== Upgrades ==
- 1997 – A color replay board above center court was added, dubbed SpartanVision.
- 2001 – An expansion added two, 8,000-square-foot (740 m^{2}) auxiliary gyms and office space.
- 2005 – A large black drop curtain to close off the upper deck in efforts to make smaller events "less empty" was added.
- 2006 – The scrolling advertisements were replaced at the score's table with TV screens.
- 2007 – The home team locker rooms were renovated and the ceilings raised, as players on both the men's and women's teams were approaching 7'.
- 2010 – The basketball floor was repainted to adopt the new shade of green and the new appearance of MSU Athletics.
- 2011 – A larger, HD overhead scoreboard and LED rings around the lower concourse were added.
- 2012 – The basketball floor was repainted again with a larger logo at center court, replacement of MSU logos with a Big Ten logo at the free throw lines, and removal of brighter wood inside the three-point line.
- 2016 – The basketball floor was repainted again, keeping the large Spartan logo in the center of the court and adding a two-tone design with darker colored wood for the area inside the three-point line and a single random stripe outside the visitors' 3 point line on the right.
- 2017 – A $50 million renovation added the Tom Izzo Hall of History, a new weight room, a former players' locker room, a players' lounge, and a recruiting room; widened the concourse; and updated the restrooms and concession stands.

== Notable entertainers who have performed at Breslin ==
Musical groups

- Aerosmith
- Anberlin
- Backstreet Boys
- Barenaked Ladies
- The Beach Boys
- The Black Watch (Royal Highland Regiment) Pipes and Drums
- Brand New
- Bush
- Counting Crows
- Daughtry
- Dave Matthews Band
- Death Cab for Cutie
- Def Leppard
- Extreme
- Goo Goo Dolls
- Incubus
- Jimmy Eat World
- KISS
- Maroon 5
- Meshuggah
- Milli Vanilli
- Mötley Crüe
- Muse
- No Doubt
- Pearl Jam
- Phil Lesh and Friends
- Poison
- R.E.M.
- Razorlight
- Red Hot Chili Peppers
- The Smashing Pumpkins
- Sons of Sylvia
- Tool
- Trans-Siberian Orchestra
- ZZ Top

Individual musical performers

- Bryan Adams
- Tori Amos
- Dierks Bentley
- Sarah Brightman
- Garth Brooks
- Cher
- Kenny Chesney
- Ani DiFranco
- Bob Dylan
- Don Henley
- Whitney Houston
- Jay Z
- Elton John
- Toby Keith
- Miranda Lambert
- Lil Uzi Vert
- Lil Wayne
- Ludacris
- John Mayer
- Reba McEntire
- Craig Morgan
- Nas
- Ted Nugent
- Dolly Parton
- Katy Perry
- Kenny Rogers
- Bob Seger
- Tupac Shakur
- Paul Simon
- George Strait
- Taylor Swift
- Josh Turner
- Shania Twain
- Keith Urban
- Kenny G
- Carrie Underwood
- Kanye West

Comedians

- Dave Chappelle
- Jeff Dunham
- Will Ferrell
- Kevin Hart
- Larry the Cable Guy
- Jay Leno
- Conan O'Brien
- Ron White
- Theo Von

Other

- Cirque du Soleil
- Capital City Comic Con
- The Harlem Globetrotters
- Monster Truck Nationals
- Sesame Street Live
- Stars on Ice
- World Wrestling Entertainment
- Winter Jam

== Notable conferences ==
- Order of the Arrow, National Order of the Arrow Conference (2006, 2012, 2015)
- Odyssey of the Mind World Finals, (2007, 2010, 2013, 2015, 2017, 2023, 2025)
- State of Michigan Democratic Convention (2018)

== See also ==
- List of NCAA Division I basketball arenas
