= Night of Joy (festival) =

Christian music event at Walt Disney World Resort, Florida

Coordinates: 28.4186°N 81.5811°W

Night of Joy was an annual contemporary Christian music festival that took place from 1983 to 2017 at Walt Disney World Resort in Florida. The festival was normally hosted at the Magic Kingdom in early September. It was cancelled in 2018 and replaced with a mainstream Eat to the Beat concert series, with Christian pop rock artists MercyMe and Tauren Wells joining the lineup. Night of Joy inspired two other Christian rock festivals in the Orlando region: Cornerstone Florida, which ran in the month of May from 2003 to 2007, and Rock the Universe at Universal Studios Florida, in operation since 1998.

== Venues ==
Most concerts were held at the Magic Kingdom, in front of the Cinderella Castle. Other venues included:

- Disney's Hollywood Studios for the 2008 and 2009 concerts
- ESPN Wide World of Sports Complex for the 2016 and 2017 concerts

Six artists have performed at all three venues: Casting Crowns, Chris Tomlin, MercyMe, Newsboys, Red and tobyMac. Several other artists have performed at two of these venues.

== Later Years (2010-2017) ==
=== 2017 ===
Friday, September 8:

- TobyMac
- MercyMe
- Zach Williams
- Natalie Grant
- Danny Gokey
- Matt Maher
- Colton Dixon
- Rend Collective

Saturday, September 9 (cancelled):

- Amy Grant
- Steven Curtis Chapman
- Kirk Franklin
- Jordan Feliz
- Crowder
- Jeremy Camp
- Tye Tribbett

The event returned at the ESPN Wide World of Sports and was scheduled to last two nights, but the September 9 event was cancelled as a precautionary measure against Hurricane Irma. Park tickets for September 9 could either be honored on September 8 or returned for a full refund.

=== 2016 ===
Friday, September 9:

- Stars Go Dim
- Matthew West
- Francesca Battistelli
- Zealand Worship
- Crowder
- Chris Tomlin
- OBB
- MercyMe
- Casting Crowns
- Thruflyte

Saturday, September 10:

- Veridia
- Thousand Foot Krutch
- Hillsong Young & Free
- RED
- For King & Country
- Tim Timmons
- Switchfoot
- Derek Minor
- Newsboys

=== 2015 ===
Friday, September 11:

- TobyMac
- MercyMe
- Jeremy Camp
- Colton Dixon
- Big Daddy Weave
- Francesca Battistelli
- Rend Collective
- I Am They
- Josh Wilson

Saturday, September 12:

- Skillet
- Lecrae
- For King & Country
- Mandisa
- Matt Maher
- Jamie Grace
- 7eventh Time Down
- Veridia

=== 2014 ===
Friday, September 5:

- Matthew West
- Chris Tomlin
- Hillsong United
- Building 429
- Mandisa
- For King and Country
- Matt Maher
- The Neverclaim

Saturday, September 6:

- MercyMe
- Phil Perry
- Casting Crowns
- Skillet
- Colton Dixon
- Britt Nicole
- Israel Houghton & New Breed
- 1 Girl Nation
- We as Human
- Rhett Walker Band

=== 2013 ===
Friday, September 6:

- MercyMe
- Steven Curtis Chapman & Michael W. Smith
- Skillet
- Mandisa
- For King and Country
- Audio Adrenaline
- Moriah Peters
- We As Human
- City Harbor

Saturday, September 7:

- Newsboys
- TobyMac
- Francesca Battistelli
- Group 1 Crew
- Building 429
- Plumb
- Matthew West
- Jamie Grace
- Gospel Music Association Winner Steven Musso

=== 2012 ===
Friday, September 7:

- Casting Crowns
- Chris Tomlin
- NEEDTOBREATHE
- Red
- Francesca Battistelli
- Brandon Heath
- Royal Tailor
- Disciple

Saturday, September 8:

- MercyMe
- Third Day
- Kutless
- Thousand Foot Krutch
- Lecrae
- Chris August
- Dara Maclean
- Yolanda Adams
- Gospel Music Association Winner Theresa Bailey

=== 2011 ===
Friday, September 9:

- Skillet
- Newsboys
- Jeremy Camp
- Disciple (band)
- Sidewalk Prophets
- Francesca Battistelli
- Group 1 Crew
- Matthew West

Saturday, September 10:

- MercyMe
- TobyMac
- Jars of Clay
- Sanctus Real
- Kutless
- Marvin Sapp
- VaShawn Mitchell
- Chris August

=== 2010 ===
Friday, September 10:

- Chris Tomlin
- David Crowder*Band
- Casting Crowns
- BarlowGirl
- Thousand Foot Krutch
- Group 1 Crew
- Tenth Avenue North
- Sidewalk Prophets

Saturday, September 11:

- MercyMe
- Third Day
- Family Force 5
- Smokie Norful
- Red
- Lecrae
- Day of Fire
- Britt Nicole

The event returned to Magic Kingdom after two years of being held at Disney's Hollywood Studios.

== Early Years (1983-2009) ==
=== 2009 ===
Friday, September 11:

- Above the Golden State
- Abandon
- Josh Wilson
- Chris Tomlin
- P.O.D.
- Newsboys
- Kutless
- Needtobreathe
- Leeland
- Superchick
Saturday, September 12:

Compilation album from Night of Joy 2009.

- Above the Golden State
- Abandon
- Josh Wilson
- MercyMe
- Flyleaf
- Skillet
- Jars of Clay
- Family Force 5
- GRITS
- Mandisa

The official 2009 lineup was announced in March 2009. It featured more rock bands than usual and incorporated three acts common to both days of the performance, following "Conversations" with acts performing one of the two days. This is the final Night of Joy held at Disney's Hollywood Studios.

=== 2008 ===
Friday, September 5:

- Chris Tomlin
- MercyMe
- Rebecca St. James
- BarlowGirl
- Matthew West
- Rush of Fools
- Brandon Heath
- Britt Nicole

Saturday, September 6:

- Casting Crowns
- tobyMac
- Music in the Rockies (Best of Show winner from GMA)
- Fred Hammond
- Marcos Witt
- Mandisa
- Aaron Shust
- Red (band)
- pureNRG

This is the first of two consecutive events held at Disney's Hollywood Studios. Previously, Night of Joy was held exclusively at the Magic Kingdom theme park.

=== 2007 ===
Friday, September 7:

- Third Day
- Chris Tomlin
- David Crowder Band
- Jaci Velasquez
- Brian Littrell
- BarlowGirl
- Leeland
- Jessie Daniels
- Sanctus Real

Saturday, September 8:

- Newsboys
- Steven Curtis Chapman
- Salvador
- Mark Schultz
- Smokie Norful
- Kutless
- Red
- Mary Mary
- Flyleaf
- Music in the Rockies

=== 2006 ===
Friday, September 8:

- BarlowGirl
- Casting Crowns
- MercyMe
- Rebecca St. James
- David Crowder Band
- Vicky Beeching
- Matthew West
- Todd Agnew
- Building 429

Saturday, September 9:

- BarlowGirl
- TobyMac
- Kirk Franklin
- Smokie Norful
- Jeremy Camp
- Crystal Stark
- The Afters
- ZOEgirl
- Hawk Nelson

=== 2005 ===
Friday, September 9:

- MercyMe
- Casting Crowns
- Audio Adrenaline
- Steven Curtis Chapman
- Mark Shultz
- Big Daddy Weave
- Nicole C. Mullen
- Matthew West
- Vicky Beeching

Saturday, September 10:

- Newsboys
- CeCe Winans
- Donnie McClurkin
- TobyMac
- Kutless
- Superchick
- Further Seems Forever
- Tree63
- Stellar Kart
- Kierra Sheard

=== 2004 ===
Friday, September 9:

- Michael W. Smith
- Avalon
- Jars of Clay
- Point of Grace
- FFH
- 4HIM
- Mark Shultz
- Across the Sky

Saturday, September 10:

- Third Day
- Skillet
- Stryper
- Rebecca St. James
- SONICFLOOd
- Steven Curtis Chapman
- downhere
- Warren Barfield

Sunday, September 11:

- Kirk Franklin
- Jaci Velasquez
- CeCe Winans
- Salvador
- Jump 5
- Jeremy Camp
- Joy Williams
- 12 Stones

=== 2003 ===
Friday, September 5:

- Petra
- Jars of Clay
- Michael W. Smith
- Stacie Orrico
- Rebecca St. James
- Nicole C. Mullen
- Switchfoot
- downhere
- Daily Planet

Saturday, September 6:

- The O.C. Supertones
- Point of Grace
- ZOEGirl
- Kirk Franklin
- Rachael Lampa
- Salvador
- Freddie Colloca
- Yolanda Adams

=== 2002 ===
Friday, September 6:

- Plus One
- Kirk Franklin
- Benjamin Gate
- Mary Mary
- Steven Curtis Chapman
- ZOEgirl
- Natalie Grant
- Phat Chance

Saturday, September 7:

- Petra
- Audio Adrenaline
- Michael W. Smith
- Jaci Velasquez
- Stacie Orrico
- Plus One
- Joy Williams
- Jump5

=== 2001 ===
Friday, September 7:

- Kirk Franklin
- Jars of Clay
- Plus One
- Jaci Velasquez
- Staci Orrico
- Rachael Lampa
- Salvador

Saturday, September 8:

- Michael W. Smith
- Jars of Clay
- Plus One
- Anointed
- Rebecca St. James
- Whisper Loud
- Salvador

=== 2000 ===
- Newsboys
- Jaci Velasquez
- Out of Eden
- Plumb
- Raze
- CeCe Winans

=== 1999 ===
- Michael W. Smith
- Fred Hammond
- Delirious?
- Jaci Velasquez
- Avalon
- Audio Adrenaline
- Out of Eden

=== 1998 ===
- God's Property
- Jars of Clay
- Avalon
- Third Day
- Bob Carlisle
- Greg Long

=== 1997 ===
- Steven Curtis Chapman
- Jars of Clay
- NewSong
- Anointed
- Sarah Masen
- Hezekiah Walker

=== 1996 ===
- dc Talk
- Michael W. Smith
- Newsboys
- Hezekiah Walker
- Rebecca St. James
- Clay Crosse

=== 1995 ===
- Carman
- Steven Curtis Chapman
- Audio Adrenaline
- Shirley Caesar
- Point of Grace

=== 1994 ===
- dc Talk
- Twila Paris
- Geoff Moore & The Distance
- Point of Grace
- Richard Smallwood Singers
- Whiteheart

=== 1993 ===
- Carman
- Steven Curtis Chapman
- 4HIM
- Shirley Caesar
- Bruce Carroll
- Susan Ashton

=== 1992 ===
- Petra
- dc Talk
- The Winans
- Steven Curtis Chapman
- Geoff Moore & The Distance
- Cindy Morgan

=== 1991 ===
- Petra
- Stryper
- REZ

=== 1990 ===
- Shirley Caesar
- Carman
- Steven Curtis Chapman
- DeGarmo & Key
- Petra
- REZ
- DC Talk
- Whiteheart

=== 1989 ===
- Margaret Becker & the Reckoning
- Shirley Caesar
- Phil Keaggy
- Petra
- REZ
- Michael W Smith
- Take 6

=== 1988 ===
- Geoff Moore & the Distance
- Mylon & Broken Heart
- Stryper
- Russ Taff
- Take 6
- White Heart
- BeBe & CeCe Winans

=== 1987 ===
- Kim Boyce
- The Clark Sisters
- Benny Hester
- The Imperials
- Petra
- Michael W Smith
- Randy Stonehill
- Greg X Volz

=== 1986 ===
- Darrell Mansfield
- Leon Patillo
- Petra
- Stryper
- Russ Taff
- Sheila Walsh
- The Winans

=== 1985 ===
Friday, May 7:

- The Archers
- Phillip Bailey
- Debby Boone
- Andraé Crouch
- Phil Driscoll
- Glad

Friday and Saturday, September 6 and 7:

- AD (band)
- David and the Giants
- David Meece
- Michael W Smith
- Petra
- White Heart

Night of Joy 1985 is the only instance where an event occurred outside of September.

=== 1984 ===
- Debby Boone
- Clark Sisters
- Dion
- Amy Grant
- Darrell Mansfield
- Leon Patillo
- REZ

=== 1983 ===
- Leon Patillo (First performer to headline Disney's Night of Joy.)
- Shirley Caesar
- Petra
- Phil Keaggy
- Sheila Walsh
- Benny Hester
- David Meece
- Scott Wesley Brown
