= Numb (Veridia song) =

Single by Veridia

from the album The Beast You Feed
- Released: July 27, 2018
- Recorded: 2018
- Genre: Alternative
- Length: 3:17
- Songwriters: Veridia; Michelle Buzz; Mike Hart
- Producer: Matt Squire

Veridia singles chronology
"Still Breathing" (2016)	"Numb" (2018)	"I Won't Stay Down" (2018)

Music video
- "Numb – Live Video" on YouTube

"Numb" is a song by the Alternative band Veridia that was released as the first single from their first full-length album The Beast You Feed. "Numb" was released to all major outlets on July 27, 2018.

== Composition ==
Mary Nikkel of "RockOnPurpose" describes it "an introduction to a new era of Veridia", praising the lyrical theme of "numbing out our pain"."

Joshua Andre from 365DaysofInspiringMedia similarly found the lyrics to be "probing and asking question after question; encouraging us to be better".

=== Song meaning ===
Joshua Andre interprets the song as "tug(ging) at the human soul, and encourag(ing) us to act like the very opposite of what the song is saying."

Deena Jakoub of Veridia says, "I realized that in taking action to numb painful emotions, I was also numbing beautiful ones. While trying to numb heartbreak, I was simultaneously numbing my ability to feel the love around me.... I've decided to stop letting fear, anxiety, and depression prevent me from having incredible experiences, from loving and truly knowing myself and others."

== Music video ==
The video footage for Numb was recorded live at the Analog in Nashville on October 6, 2018.

List of music videos, showing year released, Album and source links
Year	Title	Album	Source	Note
2018	"Numb"	The Beast You Feed	YouTube Go	Live video filmed at the album release concert

== Chart performance ==
Chart	Peak position
U.S. Billboard Christian Rock	26
