= Pretty Lies =

EP by Veridia
- Released: September 25, 2015
- Length: 17:20
- Labels: Word, Curb, Fervent

Veridia chronology
| Inseparable (2014) | Pretty Lies (2015) | Summer Sessions vol 1 (2016) |

Pretty Lies is the second extended play from Veridia. Word Records alongside Curb Records along with Fervent Records released the EP on September 25, 2015.

== Critical reception ==
Professional ratings
Review scores
| Source | Rating |
|---|---|
| 365 Days of Inspiring Media | 4.5/5 stars |
| HM Magazine | 3.5/5 stars |
| New Release Today | 4.5/5 stars |

Darcy Rumble, rating the EP three and a half stars for HM Magazine, describes, "the band has taken a polished rock sound, threw in some electronica and strings influence to produce a catchy alt-rock record." Awarding the EP four and a half stars from New Release Today, Jonathan J. Francesco states, "Pretty Lies is not only a commanding encore, but a huge step forward for the band." Joshua Andre, giving the EP four and a half stars at 365 Days of Inspiring Media, writes, "there's something musically on this EP for everyone".

== Track listing ==
Track list
| No. | Title | Length |
|---|---|---|
| 1. | "Crazy in a Good Way" | 2:53 |
| 2. | "Pretty Lies" (featuring Matty Mullins) | 3:45 |
| 3. | "At the End of the World" | 3:51 |
| 4. | "Say a Prayer" | 3:27 |
| 5. | "Pretty Lies [Valot Remix]" (featuring Matty Mullins) | 3:24 |
| Total length: | | 17:20 |

== Chart performance ==
| Chart (2015) | Peak position |
|---|---|
| US Top Christian Albums (Billboard) | 30 |
| US Heatseekers Albums (Billboard) | 22 |
