= The Beast You Feed =

Studio album by Veridia
- Released: October 26, 2018
- Length: 32:52
- Label: Independent

Veridia chronology
Summer Sessions vol 1 (2016)	The Beast You Feed (2018)

Singles from The Beast You Feed
- 1. "Numb" Released: July 27, 2018; 2. "I Won't Stay Down" Released: September 28, 2018; 3. "Cheshire Smile" Released: October 19, 2018

The Beast You Feed is the first full-length album from Veridia with the album's title being inspired by a Cherokee proverb. It was independently released on October 26, 2018 and was funded by a highly successful crowd funding campaign.

== Critical reception ==
Professional ratings
Review scores
Source	Rating
365 Days of Inspiring Media	4.5/5
JesusWired	87%

Courtney Simpson from JesusWired.com stated, "Veridia has satisfied our heart's desire to hear more of what's pouring from their hearts by at last releasing a full length album... They certainly did not waste it either."

Kayla Hefter from Onestowatch.com wrote, "Their songs combine rock, alternative-pop, and electronic elements, each telling a unique story. The Beast You Feed takes you on an emotional journey that leads you from dark confessional songs to songs of declaration and realization."

Joshua Andre at 365 Days of Inspiring Media, giving the EP a rating of four and a half out of five, wrote, "The Beast You Feed hits hard and delves into many different issues. Even if you aren't a fan of hard rock, there will be something from the release that will inspire and encourage you."

=== Singles ===
"Numb", the album's first single released on July 27, 2018 describes "drowning out sadness with music". The second single, "I Won't Stay Down", released on September 28, 2018, and serves as "both a battle cry and an ode to the discovery of inner strength". The third single, "Cheshire Smile", released on October 19, 2018, a week before the album, serves as an "example of covering up sadness with a smile."

== Track listing ==
No.	Title	Length
1.	"Numb"	3:17
2.	"Cheshire Smile"	3:28
3.	"Feed the Animal"	2:58
4.	"Savage"	3:12
5.	"Ghosts"	3:27
6.	"I Won't Stay Down"	3:26
7.	"Reckless"	3:35
8.	"Dopamine"	3:14
9.	"Perfume"	3:13
10.	"I'll Never Be Ready" (featuring Amy Lee)	3:02
Total length:		32:52

== Chart performance ==
Chart (2018)	Peak position
US Heatseekers Albums (Billboard)	14
US Top Alternative Albums (Billboard)	18
US Independent Albums (Billboard)	38
US Top Rock Albums (Billboard)	44
