= Bright Side (album) =

Studio album by OBB
- Released: September 30, 2014
- Genres: Worship, Christian rock, CCM, Christian alternative rock, pop rock
- Length: 42:50
- Label: Curb
- Producer: Justin Ebach

Bright Side is the first studio album from OBB. Curb Records released the album on September 30, 2014. They worked with Justin Ebach in the production of this album.

== Critical reception ==
Professional ratings
Review scores
Source	Rating
365 Days of Inspiring Media	4/5 stars
New Release Today	4/5 stars
Worship Leader	4/5 stars

Awarding the album four stars at Worship Leader, Jay Akins states, "Bright Side is a solid offering of music that works well in a student ministry or outreach setting." Sarah Fine, giving the album four stars by New Release Today, writes, "Technicalities aside, this is a strong debut from a band that has the potential to stay the course for years to come." Rating the album four stars from 365 Days of Inspiring Media, Jonathan Andre says, "what Bright Side delivers is good radio pop- and if the album is taken and listened as it is rather than what we all wish it to be, the album will serve as a great vessel for praise and worship, which is exactly what OBB accomplish within these 12 tracks."

== Track listing ==
No.	Title	Writer(s)	Length
1.	"Gone"	Justin Ebach, Jacob Oswald, Nicholas Oswald, Zach Oswald	2:59
2.	"Who Cares If We're Dancing"	Ebach, J. Oswald, N. Oswald, Z. Oswald	3:07
3.	"All Eyes on You"	Ebach, J. Oswald, N. Oswald, Z. Oswald, Nate Sallie	3:23
4.	"Up Close and Personal"	Ebach, Ross King, J. Oswald, N. Oswald, Z. Oswald	4:22
5.	"That Kind of Faith"	Ebach, J. Oswald, N. Oswald, Z. Oswald, Tony Wood	3:26
6.	"Your Love is an Ocean"	Paul Allen, Ebach, J. Oswald, N. Oswald, Z. Oswald	3:38
7.	"Bright Side"	Ebach, J. Oswald, N. Oswald, Z. Oswald	3:55
8.	"Looking for a Girl"	Ebach, J. Oswald, N. Oswald, Z. Oswald, Wood	3:41
9.	"Above it All"	Ebach, J. Oswald, N. Oswald, Z. Oswald	3:27
10.	"Beyond This Moment"	Chuck Butler, Ebach, J. Oswald, N. Oswald, Z. Oswald, Wood	4:33
11.	"My Relief"	Ebach, J. Oswald, N. Oswald, Z. Oswald	3:44
12.	"Wake Me Up (Acoustic)"	Matt Armstrong, Ebach, Micah Kuiper, J. Oswald, N. Oswald, Z. Oswald	2:35
Total length:			42:50

== Chart performance ==
Chart (2015)	Peak position
US Top Christian Albums (Billboard)	22
US Heatseekers Albums (Billboard)	10
