= Inseparable (EP) =

EP by Veridia
- Released: February 25, 2014
- Genres: Christian alternative rock, alternative rock
- Length: 16:57
- Labels: Word, Curb, Fervent

Veridia chronology
| Inseparable (2014) | Pretty Lies (2015) |

Inseparable is the first extended play from Veridia. Word Records alongside Curb Records along with Fervent Records released the EP on February 25, 2014.

== Critical reception ==
Professional ratings
Review scores
| Source | Rating |
|---|---|
| Christian Music Zine | 4.5/5 stars |
| Indie Vision Music | 4/5 stars |
| Jesus Freak Hideout | 4/5 stars |
| Jesus Wired | 5/5 stars |
| New Release Today | 4/5 stars |

Awarding the EP four stars from Jesus Freak Hideout, Wayne Myatt stated: "Deena Jakoub provides some pretty remarkable vocals throughout this album...It's not often that an artist can put out a fine debut project like this." Jonathan J. Francesco, giving the EP four stars at New Release Today, wrote "VERIDIA's debut effort exudes talent and potential...For a band just making an initial splash on the music scene, VERIDIA has hit a home run." Rating the EP four stars for Indie Vision Music, Jonathan Andre said: "VERIDIA and their explosion onto the artist roster at Word Records is a refreshing and invigorating moment, as the band remind us that female fronted bands are still alive and popular today, just as male fronted bands are continually being enjoyed and loved by fans from around the world...A great first musical offering from a band that has a great future in both the mainstream and Christian industry, well done VERIDIA for such a powerful and impacting album!" Joshua Andre, signaling in a four and a half star review by Christian Music Zine, said: "Deena's vocals are exquisite! Inseparable is pretty awesome". Indicating in a five star review for Jesus Wired, Angel Journey responded: "Every song is a lyrical masterpiece that will cause much needed reflection and meditation."

== Track listing ==
Track list
| No. | Title | Length |
|---|---|---|
| 1. | "We Are the Brave" | 3:35 |
| 2. | "Disconnected" | 3:13 |
| 3. | "Furious Love" | 3:30 |
| 4. | "Mechanical Planet" | 3:02 |
| 5. | "Mystery of the Invisible" | 3:37 |
| Total length: | | 16:57 |

== Chart performance ==
| Chart (2015) | Peak position |
|---|---|
| US Top Christian Albums (Billboard) | 17 |
| US Heatseekers Albums (Billboard) | 4 |
