= Veridia =

American alternative rock band

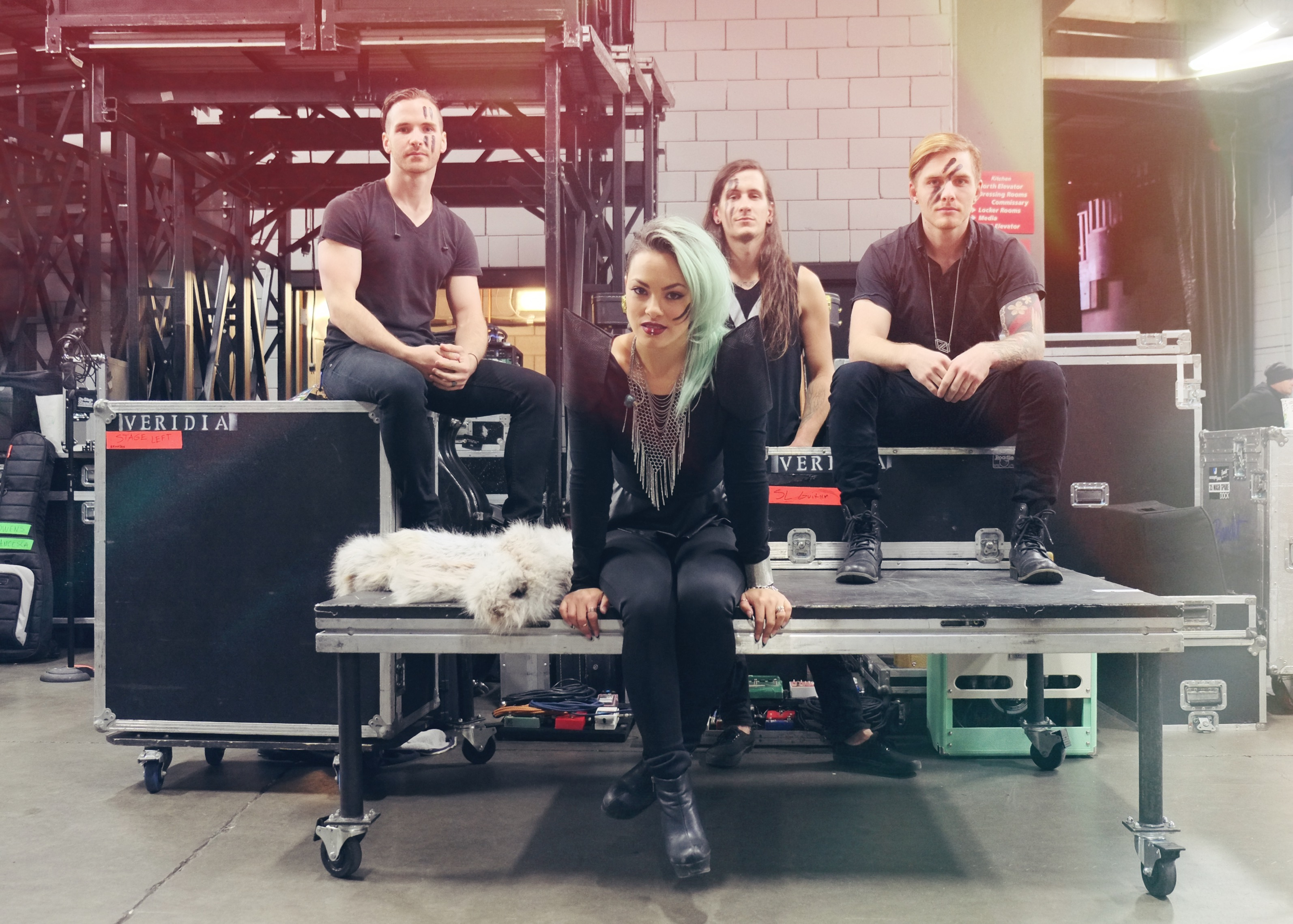
- Veridia in 2014. From left to right: Brandon Brown, Deena Jakoub, Kyle Levy, Trevor Hinesley.

Background information
- Origin: Nashville, Tennessee
- Genres: Alternative rock
- Years active: 2013–present
- Labels: Word/Curb, Razor & Tie
- Members: Deena Jakoub; Brandon Brown; Kyle Levy
- Past members: Trevor Hinesley
- Website: veridiamusic.com

Veridia, often stylized in all capital letters as VERIDIA, is an American alternative rock band from Nashville, Tennessee. Formed in 2013, the group now consists of Deena Jakoub (vocals), Brandon Brown (guitar), and Kyle Levy (drums). The band's music has been charted on Christian rock and contemporary Christian music charts, although the band themselves reject this label.

They released Inseparable EP in 2014 and Pretty Lies EP in 2015 on Word Entertainment/Curb, Warner Music Group. Summer Sessions Vol. 1 EP was released in 2016 as a free download. The Beast You Feed, their first full-length album, was independently released on October 26, 2018.

== History ==
=== Beginnings (2012–2013) ===
Veridia formed when Deena Jakoub (vocals) and Brandon Brown (guitar) moved from Dallas to Nashville after the end of their previous band Don't Wake Aislin, in late 2012. Seeking a new start with a fresh sound, they quickly recruited Trevor Hinesley (guitar) and Kyle Levy (drums) to round out the quartet (unnamed at the time) in December 2012. They do not have a bassist as a permanent band member in the band, nor do they have one performing in a live setting.

In early 2013, the group began writing and demoing songs with various co-writers and producers in Nashville while trying to determine what they would name their newly formed group. They eventually settled on Veridia, a combination of the words "veritas" (Latin for "truth") and "veridical" (also meaning "truth"). Of the name, Jakoub says, "Veridia means 'of truth.' It's our creed, to strive for raw honesty in all that we do, being true to ourselves, the ones we love and in our music." To include a form of "truth" as part of their name was inspired by Kahlil Gibran. They call the naming process one of the biggest early challenges the band had overcome. In a Q&A at Pulse Radio headquarters in 2016, guitarist Hinesley stated that the name for the band was almost "Aviara". "We had the dumbest band names in the world," he said. "Don't hire us if you need a band name!"

=== Inseparable EP and Winter Jam (2014–2015) ===
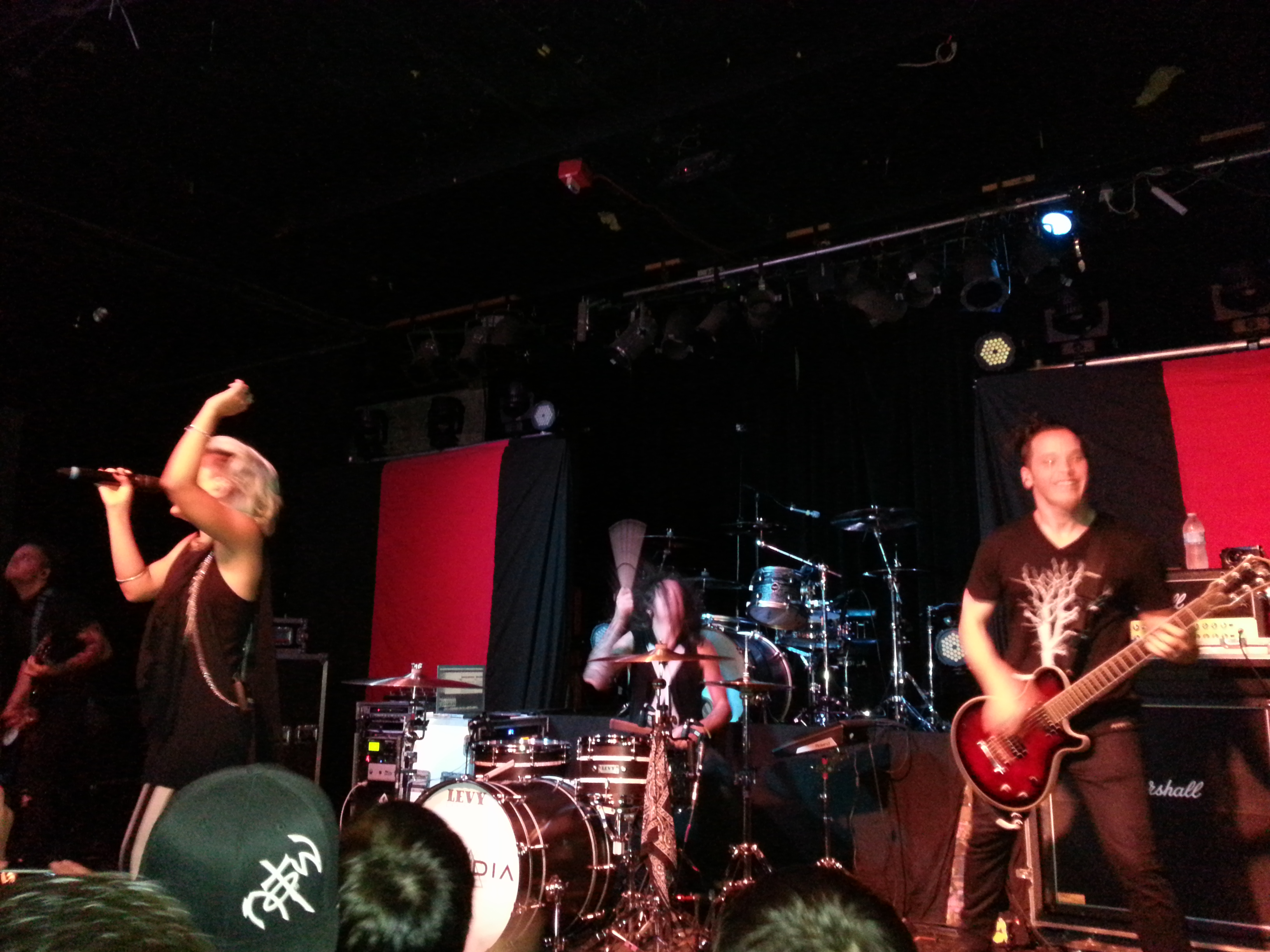
The band playing at a venue in 2014

Before recording Inseparable, the band wrote more than 70 songs trying to develop their sound and find their identity as a young band. Of those songs, they eventually narrowed the list down to 5 songs they would take into the studio with three different producers. "We Are the Brave," "Disconnected," and "Furious Love" were produced by Ian Eskelin; "Mechanical Planet" was produced by Matt Bronleewe; "Mystery of the Invisible" was produced by Stephen Keech (of Haste the Day). Jakoub is quoted as to have been listening to bands such as Chvrches, Twenty One Pilots, and Panic! at the Disco while helping write songs.

On February 4, 2014, the band released an album trailer video on YouTube and launched an iTunes pre-order with "We Are the Brave" as an instant free track. And on February 24, the band partnered with HM Magazine to stream the album the day before it was released.

The song was later picked up by ESPN for use in their television broadcasts of NCAA Softball.

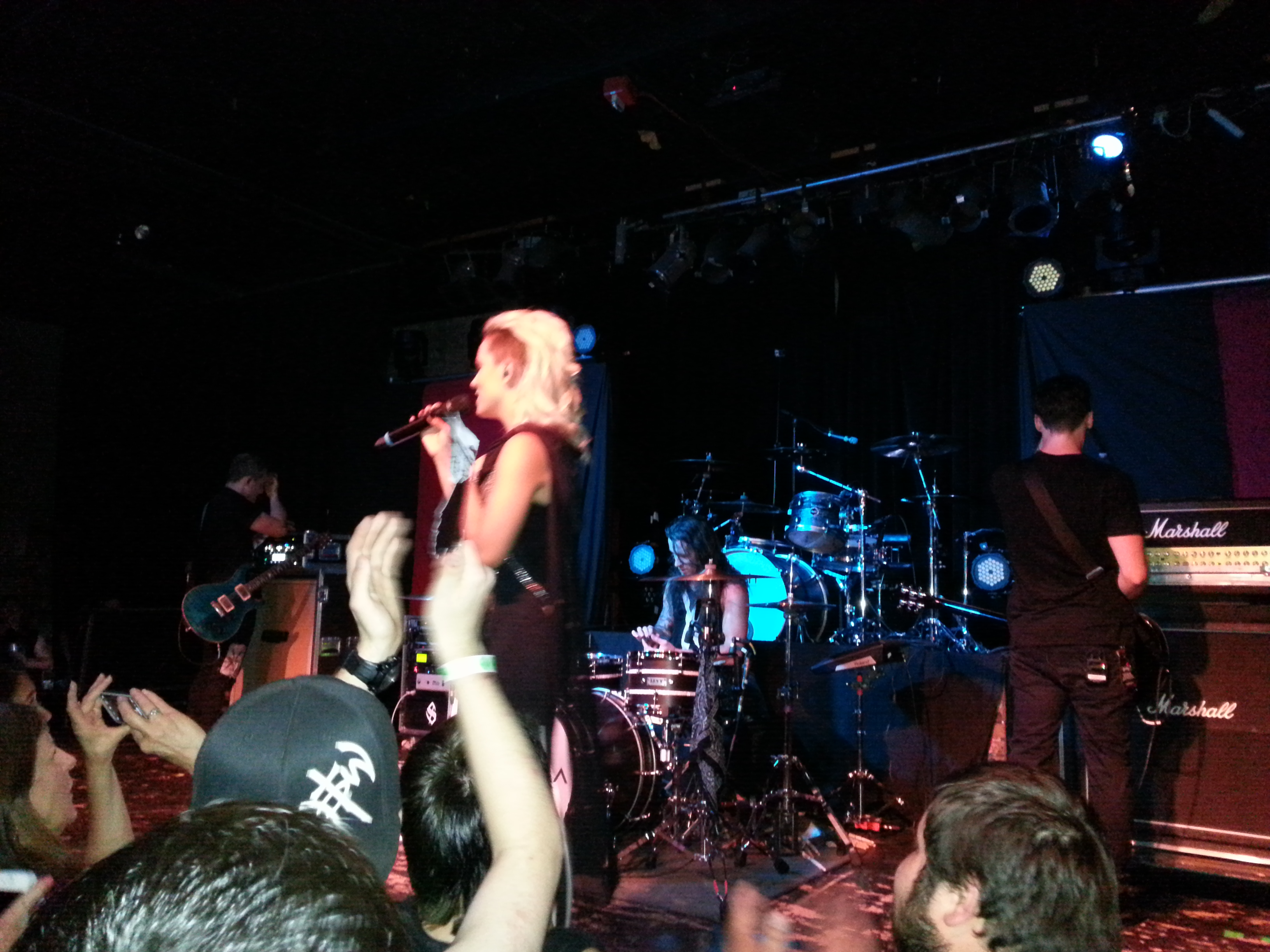
Veridia performing in 2014

the band was tapped to open Suburbia Music Festival in Plano, Texas on May 4, 2014. The festival, produced by Live Nation and headlined by David Guetta, Alabama Shakes, and J. Cole, was the band's second show ever and first show in the Dallas metroplex, hometown of Jakoub and Brown.

A music video for "Disconnected" was filmed in Austin, Texas with director Traci Goudie the week of May 5, 2014, and later released on July 21, 2014.

They went on their first tour as the opening act for Red and Demon Hunter in August 2014.

They performed at Voodoo Music + Arts Experience in New Orleans, Louisiana on Halloween (October 31, 2014), which was produced by Live Nation and headlined by Foo Fighters, Outkast, Arctic Monkeys, and Skrillex.

They served as the opening act on Winter Jam West 2014 boasting attendance of 112,000 over nine shows across arenas in New Mexico, Arizona, California, Idaho, Washington, and Oregon. They will open for the East 2015 leg of the tour, playing 47 shows in arenas across the east coast, midwest, and south.

=== Pretty Lies EP (2015–2016) ===
In mid-2015, the group released a set of five videos of acoustic songs not on the "Inseparable" EP, titled Summer Sessions. In April 2016, they released these songs as a free download called Summer Sessions, Vol. I.

In 2015, they released their second EP, Pretty Lies. The title track featured vocals from Matty Mullins of Memphis May Fire. The music video was released on March 10, 2016, and a commentary video, featuring Jakoub, and filmed in Nashville, Tennessee, was also released.

In late 2015, the band began their first headlining tour, the "Only the Crazy Survive Tour". For their tour, they partnered with Mocha Club, an organization committed to helping people in Africa.

In 2016, they went on a summer tour with band Random Hero and ILIA. That September, they also played at Night of Joy for the second year in a row.

=== Touring, Hinesley departure and hiatus (2016–2017) ===
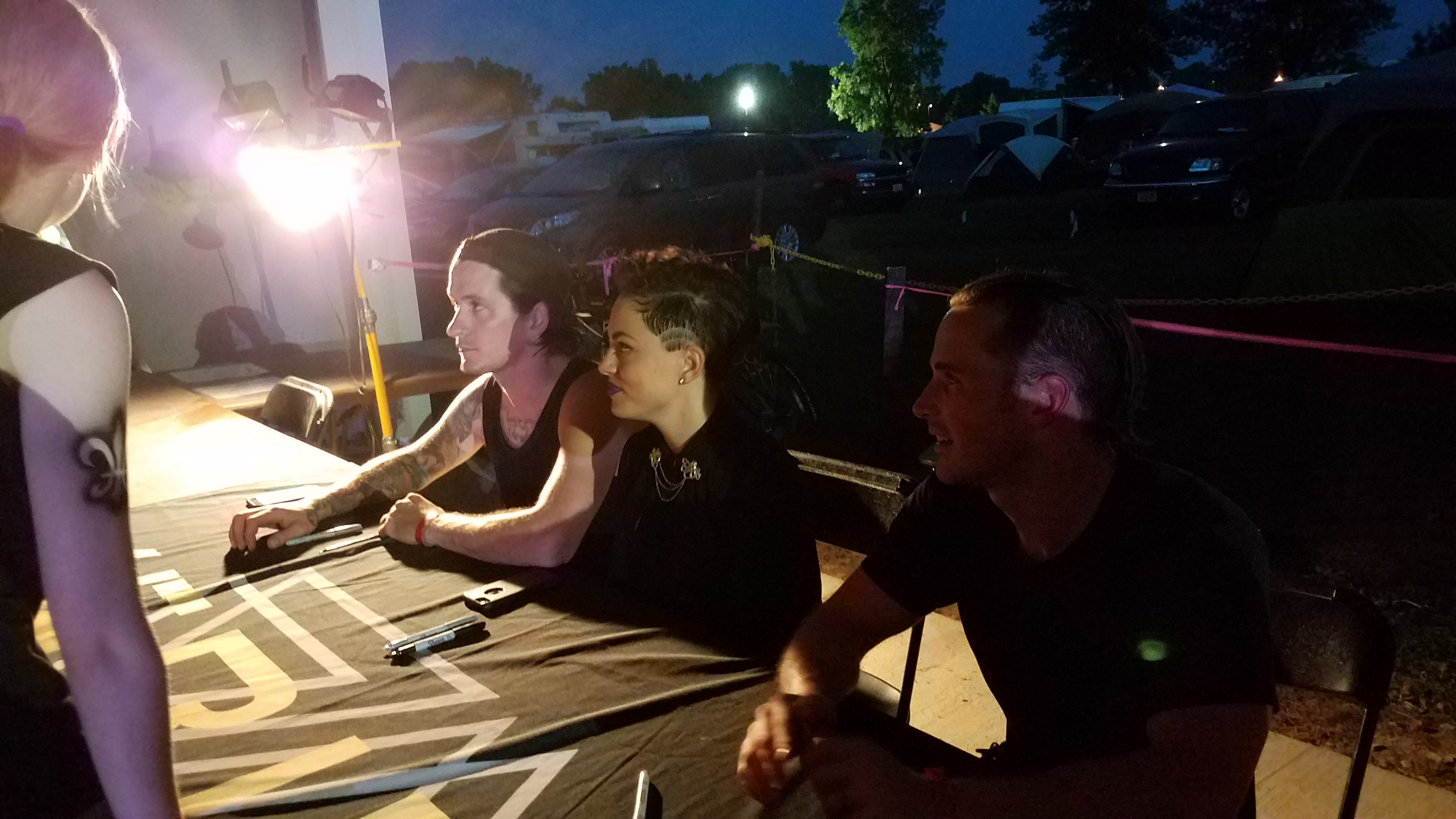
Veridia interacting with fans after their show in 2017

On September 16, 2016, the band released "Still Breathing", to radio on September 23. Being previously recorded on the Summer Sessions EP, it was rerecorded as full band electric song for the release.

On October 22, 2016, the band announced that Trevor Hinesley was leaving to focus on health and to spend more time with his family. Hinesley would not join the band for their tour with Evanescence, but would play with them on the Christmas Rock Night in Germany in December, the band's first international show. On October 28, the band went on tour with Evanescence, opening in Dallas, Texas. On October 31, 2016, they released a music video for "Still Breathing", filmed in a haunted house in Nashville, Tennessee.

During the early months of 2017, Deena Jakoub's father died. Jakoub went to Egypt, where he was from, for the first time to bury him according to his wishes. The band went on hiatus for most of 2017 in order to take more time to spend with family.

=== The Beast You Feed (2018–present) ===
The Beast You Feed album release concert, October 6, 2018
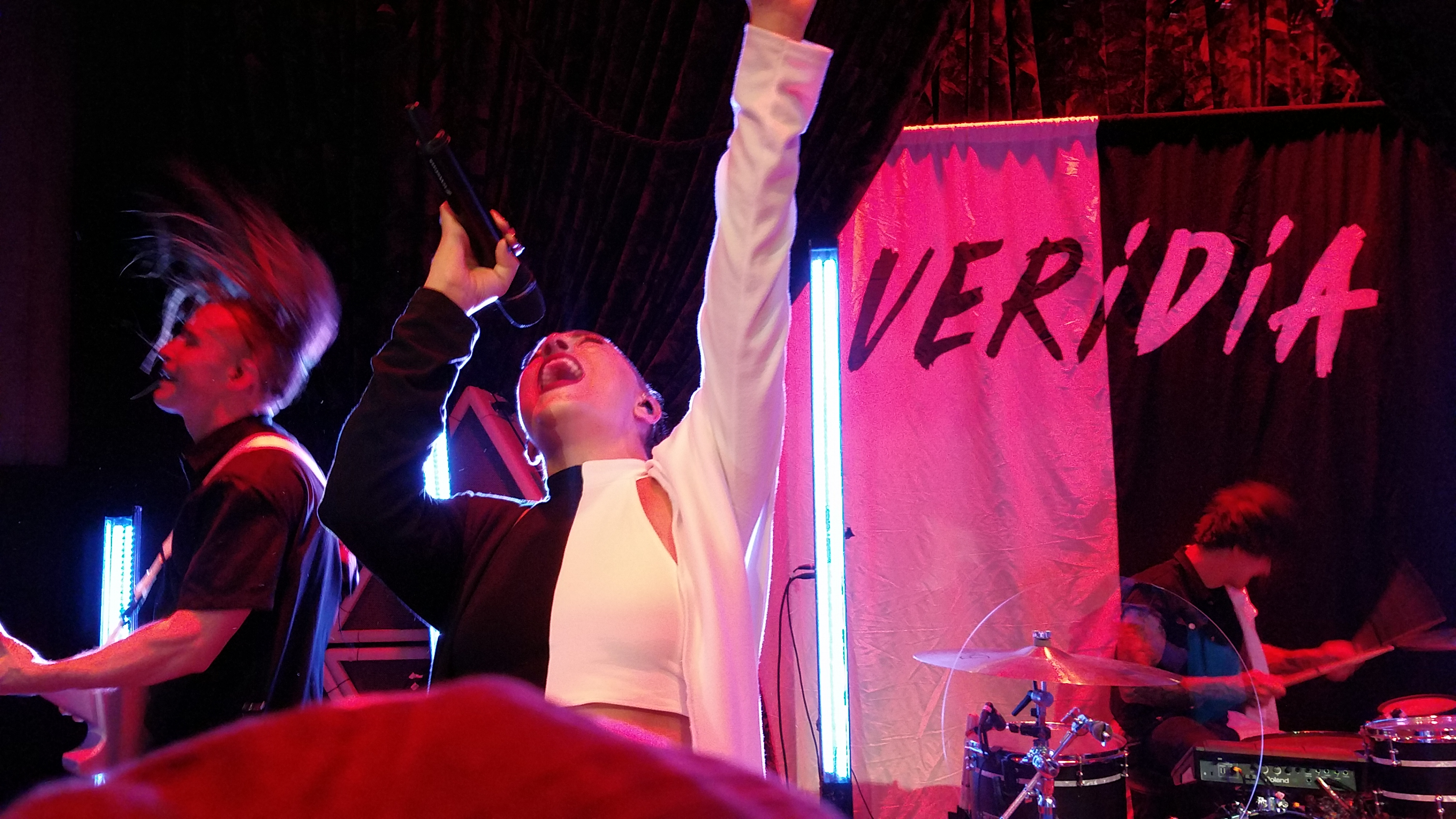
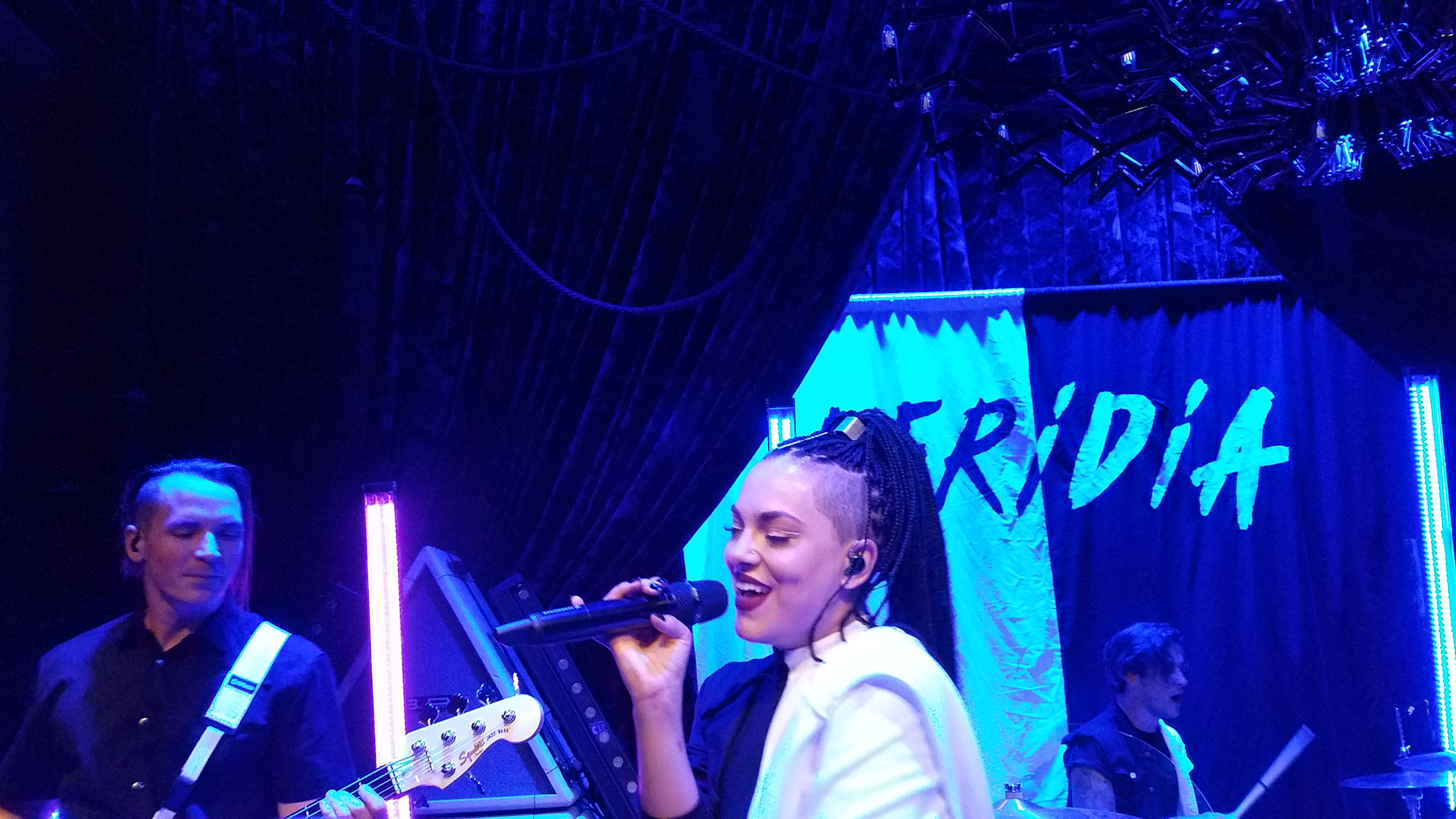

On January 7, 2018, the band announced that they had signed with Razor & Tie, and they were heading into the studio. The band recorded ten songs for the full-length album and held frequent live streams to update fans in the studio. While the band was recording the album, the Razor & Tie record label was acquired by Concord Music. This led to VERIDIA being released from Razor & Tie, later announcing that they would be releasing the album independently and launching a crowdfunding campaign. On June 29, they announced that the album, The Beast You Feed, would be released in late 2018 and launched a PledgeMusic campaign for the album's release. In less than a month, the band surpassed their goal. On July 27, 2018, they released the first single, "Numb", off the album. The album was officially released on October 26, 2018. Other singles from the album include "I Won't Stay Down" released on September 28, 2018 and "Cheshire Smile" released on October 19, 2018.

In 2019, the group toured the US and Europe with Evanescence and the US with Icon for Hire

On April 3, 2020, the band released "Blood Diamond" followed by "Light It Up" on September 25 and "Crushed Velvet" on November 20.

On January 14, 2022, the band released "Pain Reliever", the title track from their upcoming EP. They plan to perform with Evanescence and Within Temptation in April 2022 as part of the Worlds Collide tour.

== Style ==
They have been compared to Jesus music, contemporary Christian music, and female-fronted rock bands such as Flyleaf and Fireflight, their style fitting into alternative rock, and have been noted to have pop rock sounds. Signed to Christian record label, Word Records, they have been reviewed extensively by Christian media and have played and charted on Christian radio.

Jakoub has attempted to distance the band from the Christian band label stating, "we've actually never classified our music as 'Christian rock', we have always been an alternative band on all formats." "I don't believe in using faith as a marketing tool, it's not a commodity. Just let an artist write from that place of vulnerable honesty, and let the listener connect through their own story."

== Discography ==
=== Studio albums ===
List of studio albums, with selected chart positions
Title	Album details	Peak chart positions		
Title	Album details	US Heatseeker	US Christian	US Rock Album
The Beast You Feed	Released: October 26, 2018; Label: Independent; Formats: CD, digital download	14	—	44
"—" denotes a recording that did not chart or was not released in that territory.

=== Extended plays ===
List of extended plays, with selected chart positions
Title	Album details	Peak chart positions	
Title	Album details	US Heatseeker	US Christian
Inseparable	Released: February 25, 2014; Label: Word/Curb, Warner Music Group; Formats: CD, digital download	4	17
Pretty Lies	Released: September 25, 2015; Label: Word/Curb, Warner Music Group; Formats: CD, digital download	22	30
Summer Sessions, Vol. I	Released: April 7, 2016; Label: Word/Curb, Warner Music Group; Formats: free digital download	—	—
Pain Reliever	Released: September 18, 2022; Label: Independent; Formats: CD, digital download	—	—
"—" denotes a recording that did not chart or was not released in that territory.

=== Singles ===
List of singles, with selected chart positions showing year released and album name
Title	Year	Peak chart positions			Album
Title	Year	US Christian	US Christian Rock	US Hot AC/CHR	Album
"We Are the Brave"	2014	—	1	—	Inseparable EP
"Disconnected"	2014	40	12	12	Inseparable EP
"Furious Love"	2014	34	—	8	Inseparable EP
"Pretty Lies" (featuring Matty Mullins)	2015	36	1	29	Pretty Lies EP
"Still Breathing"	2016	26	2	21	non-album track
'Numb"	2018	—	26	—	The Beast You Feed
"I Won't Stay Down"	2018	—	—	—	The Beast You Feed
"Blood Diamond (الماسة الدم)"	2020	—	—	—	non-album track
"Light It Up"	2020	—	—	—	non-album track
"Crushed Velvet"	2020	—	—	—	non-album track
"Pain Reliever"	2022	—	—	—	Pain Reliever EP
"—" denotes a recording that did not chart or was not released in that territory.

=== Music videos ===
List of music videos, showing year released, Album and source links
Year	Title	Album	Source	Note
2014	"Disconnected"	Inseparable	YouTube Go	
2014	"Furious Love"	Inseparable	YouTube Go	
2016	"Pretty Lies"	Pretty Lies	YouTube Go	
2016	"Still Breathing"	Still Breathing	YouTube Go	
2018	"Numb"	The Beast You Feed	YouTube Go	Live video filmed at the album release concert
2019	"Perfume"	The Beast You Feed	YouTube Go	
2019	"I Won't Stay Down"	The Beast You Feed	YouTube Go	
2019	"I'll Never Be Ready"	The Beast You Feed	YouTube Go	
2020	"Blood Diamond (الماسة الدم)"	Blood Diamond Single	YouTube Go	Audio only video
2020	"Light It Up"	Light It Up Single	YouTube Go	Audio only video
2022	"Pain Reliever"	Pain Reliever	YouTube Go	
2022	"Poppies"	Pain Reliever	YouTube Go	

== Media usage ==
List of songs featured on various productions
Song	Where	Type
"We Are the Brave"	NCAA Softball (ESPN)	Television
"We Are the Brave"	2015 SBENU LOL Champions Korea Summer Opening Title	
"Mystery of the Invisible"	Risen: Songs that Celebrate the Epic Film	Soundtrack
