= SpartanVision =

Media production and broadcasting department of Michigan State University Athletics

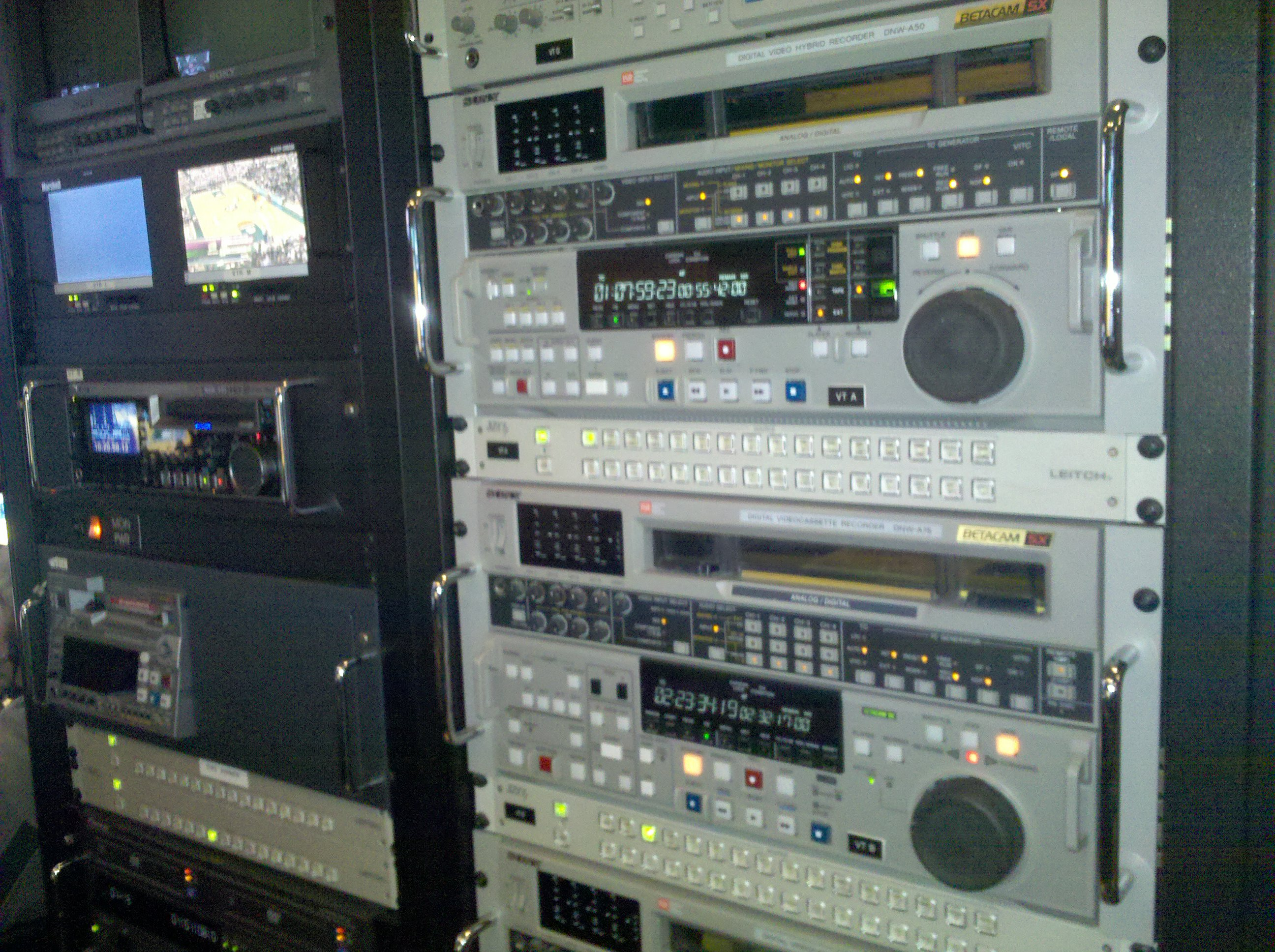
Spartan Vision control room

SpartanVision is the in-house broadcasting department of Michigan State University (MSU) and its Athletic Communications Department that operates the large video screens located at the Breslin Center, Munn Ice Arena, and Spartan Stadium. SpartanVision also produces the Spartan Sports Zone, now called Spartan All-Access, a television show hosted by MSU personality Dave Ellis that airs on The Big Ten Network and FSN.

SpartanVision has three full-time producers and hires student employees to help. The staff also helps with the msuspartans.com daily show and provides material to visiting networks.
