= Brock Gill =

American illusionist (born 1975)

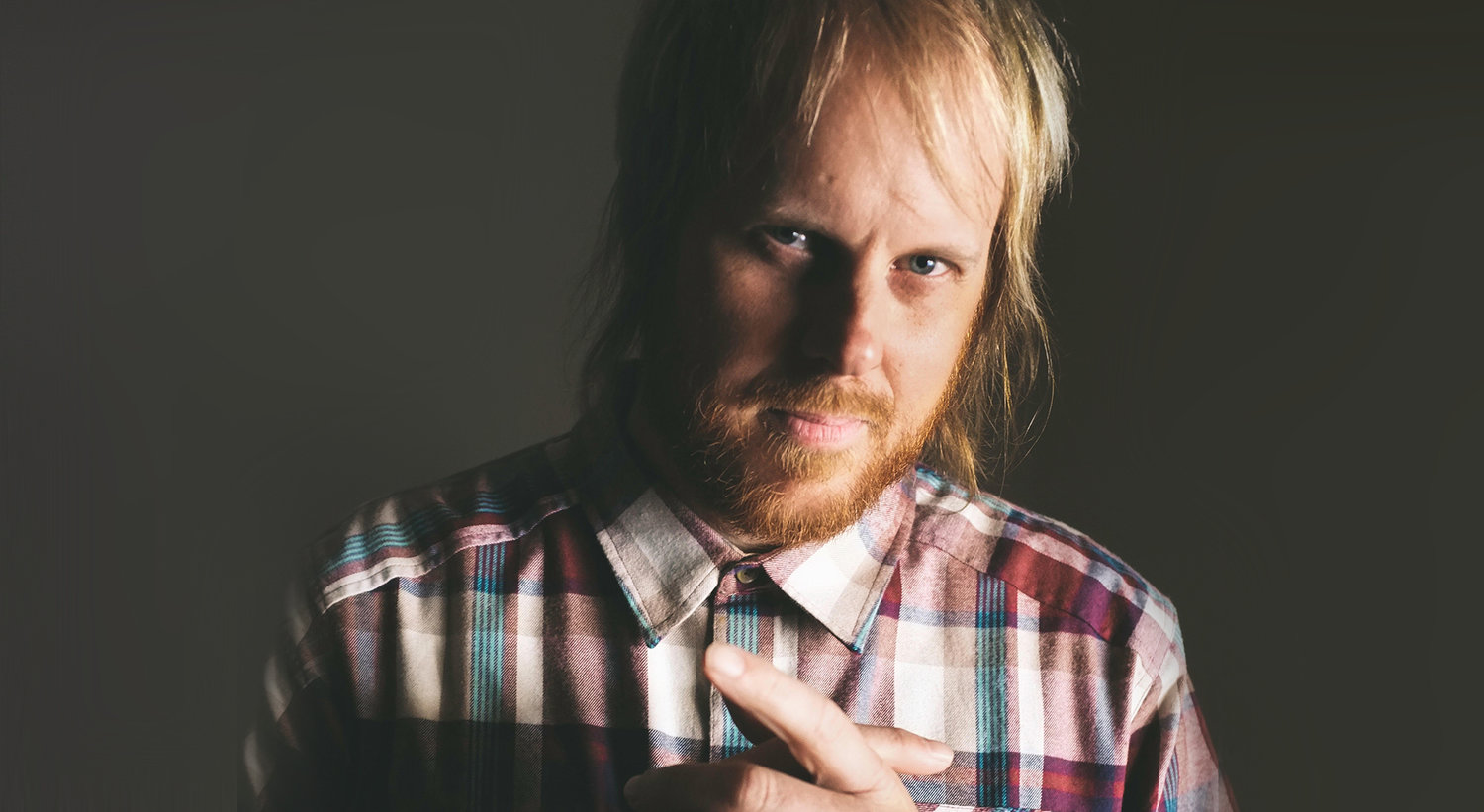
- Born: Brock David Gill; January 6, 1975 (age 51)
- Education: East Texas Baptist University
- Occupation: Illusionist Evangelist Stunt Performer
- Agent: Greg Oliver Agency (GOA) Red Letter Management Group
- Known for: Creative Evangelism
- Spouse: Andrea "Auny" Gill (married 1999 - present)
- Parents: Roger Gill (father); Linda Gill (mother)

Brock Gill (born January 6, 1975) is an illusionist, stunt artist and evangelist based out of Nashville, Tennessee.

== Early years ==
Gill attended East Texas Baptist University and had a reputation for having spontaneous church services in the open air quad on campus, baptizing people in the campus fountain.

At age 22 Gill felt led to become an illusionist and evangelist when working the graveyard shift at a saw mill in Texarkana. With ear plugs in and no one to talk to, he started praying, which led to his ministry. A youth pastor at the church in Texarkana where he was doing ministry took him to a magic shop. The man behind the counter did a simple trick, awakening something in Gill.

== Personal life ==
Gill is married to Aundrea “Auny" Gill. Gill and Auny met in 1997 while attending East Texas Baptist University where she was studying to become a child psychologist. The two married on May 8, 1999, at her father’s church in Shepherd, Texas.

The couple originally resided in Texas, later moving into a motorhome as they traveled the United States evangelizing through illusion. They now reside in Nashville, Tennessee.

== Career ==
In 1994, Gill started his career ministering through illusion.

Gill has shared the stage with many well known speakers, worship leaders, and artists such as Franklin Graham, Luis Palau, John Piper, David Nasser, Adrian Rogers, Toby Mac, Audio Adrenaline, Third Day, Relient K, Jaci Velasquez, Skillet, Mercy Me, Casting Crowns, and others.

He has performed for such organizations as Focus On The Family, BigStuf Camps, Student Life, Superwow, and on tours such as Winter Jam (2004), The Louis Palau Association’s Livin’ It with Stephen Baldwin, and Christ in Youth’s Believe tour (2001). He has appeared on multiple television programs like The GMA Dove Awards (2006), The Harvest Show, At Home Live, and Fox News Channel’s Fox and Friends and in numerous other media outlets including Passageway.com, Crosswalk.com, Baptist Standard, Christian Single, On Course Magazine, and radio programs across the country.

Gill is also a part of Freedom Experience, a nationwide city tour that combines action sports, music, and illusion.

In 2017 Gill performed with the Newsboys, Sidewalk Prophets, Blanca, Derk Minor, and Seventh Time Down as part of the Big Church Night Out tour.

== Filmography ==
In 2005, Gill hosted Miracles of Jesus, a three-hour documentary produced by the BBC and aired on the Discovery Channel.

Gill has released four full-length DVDs: Close-Up and Personal (2002) and Hidden Agenda (2005), each produced by Jupiter Project, the Dove Award-winning creators of Third Day’s The Offerings Experience and Michael W. Smith’s Worship. Standing Room Only (2006) features big stunts, such as "the bullet catch," as well as pro skateboarder Tim Byrne, X-Games gold medalist freestyle motocross rider Kevin Johnson, and other artists. His latest DVD, Alive on Stage, is available to watch on Hulu. The videos are designed to be practical evangelism tools, because they always feature a Gospel presentation.

== Organizations ==
Caliber Outreach is a non-profit organization founded by Gill that sends creative evangelists out into the world. The organization provides evangelism training for those looking to share their faith, strengthen churches in their evangelistic efforts, and strategically advance the gospel throughout creative methods. Students come from the United States and other countries.

Gill and his wife Auny have also partnered with other non-profit groups such as Compassion International, Soles 4 Soles and Parties With a Purpose.
