= OBB (band) =

American pop rock band

- Origin: Atlanta, Georgia
- Genres: pop rock
- Years active: 2008–present
- Labels: Curb
- Members: Zach Oswald; Jacob Oswald; Nich Oswald
- Website: obbmusic.com

OBB (meaning, Oswald Brothers Band) is an American pop rock band made up of the three Oswald brothers, Zach, Jacob, and Nich. They come from Atlanta, Georgia, where the band started making music in 2008. They have released four extended plays, 3 in 2011, Live, Life, Loving in 2012, OBB in 2013, and Feelin' like Christmas in 2014. The group have also released one studio album, Bright Side in 2014, and an independent album, Ready Set Go in 2009.

== Background ==
OBB is a pop/rock band from Atlanta, Georgia, where they formed in 2008, being a group of three brothers, lead vocalist and rhythm guitarist, Zach Oswald, lead guitarist, Jacob Oswald, and drummer and background vocalist, Nich Oswald.

== Music history ==
The band started as a musical entity in 2008, with their first release, Ready Set Go, that was released independently in 2009. Their second release, an extended play, 3, was released independently, in 2011. The band released a second extended play, Live, Life, Loving, on February 21, 2012, independently.

Their third extended play release, OBB, was released on January 8, 2013, from Curb Records. They released a studio album, Bright Side, on September 30, 2014, with Curb Records. The group released a Christmas extended play, Feelin' like Christmas, by Curb Records, on November 18, 2014.

== Members ==
Current members

- Zachary David Oswald – lead vocals, rhythm guitar
- Jacob Daniel Oswald – lead guitar
- Nicholas Aaron Oswald – drums, background vocals

Past members

- Paul Lombardi – rhythm guitar, background vocals

== Discography ==
Independent albums

- Ready Set Go (2009)

Studio albums

- Bright Side (September 30, 2014, Curb)

EPs

- 3 (2011, independent)
- Live, Life, Loving (February 21, 2012)
- OBB (January 8, 2013, Curb)
- Feelin' like Christmas (November 18, 2014, Curb)
- Is This A Thing (July 8, 2018, Curb)

Singles

- "7 Billion" (2019)
