= Good Enough (Evanescence song) =

2007 song by Evanescence

Single by Evanescence

from the album The Open Door
- Released: December 14, 2007
- Recorded: 2006
- Studio: Record Plant, Los Angeles
- Length: 5:31 (album version); 4:38 (music video, radio edit)
- Label: Wind-up
- Songwriter: Amy Lee
- Producer: Dave Fortman

Evanescence singles chronology
"Sweet Sacrifice" (2007)	"Good Enough" (2007)	"What You Want" (2011)

Music video
- "Good Enough" on YouTube

"Good Enough" is a song by American rock band Evanescence from their second studio album, The Open Door. It was released on December 14, 2007 in Germany as the album's fourth and final single. The song was written by singer and pianist Amy Lee and produced by Dave Fortman. It was the last song Lee wrote for the album, and placed it as the final track on the album to symbolize its hopeful theme and a new beginning.

"Good Enough" is a piano ballad featuring a strings section. The song received generally positive reviews, with music critics praising its hopeful theme and Lee's composition. The accompanying music video, directed by Marc Webb and Rich Lee, was filmed in Budapest, Hungary, and features Lee in a warehouse singing and playing the piano surrounded by flames.

== Composition and release ==
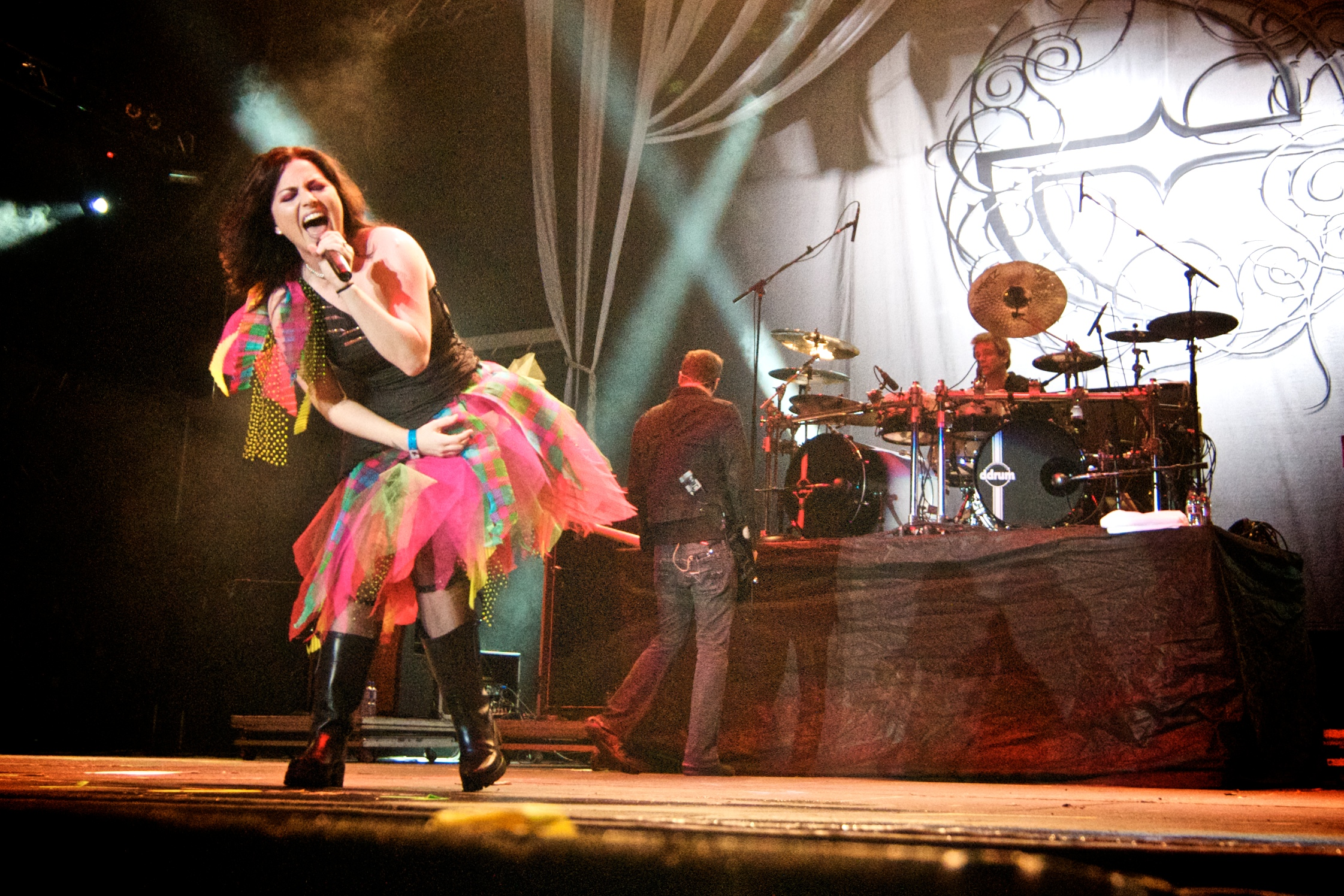
Evanescence performing during a concert in 2009

"Good Enough" was written by Amy Lee, and produced by Dave Fortman. It is the last song Lee wrote for the album. Partly inspired by her friend and husband, Josh Hartzler, Lee stated the main inspiration behind the song: "I had gone through a lot of difficult things during the writing of the whole album, and by the end of it, I had stepped away from those bad situations. [...] After doing that, I felt so amazing. For the first time I felt like I could write a song based on how good I felt. I have never done that before ever." The song expressed what she felt at the time, that "for once, I wasn't miserable, or stuck or trapped or sad or grieving." She elaborated, "You have to go through those things and make the changes you have to make and be there and go, 'Okay, I did it.' It doesn't come that easy."

Lee described the track as "completely different" for her "because it sort of [has a] happy ending". She found it "scary to be so vulnerable" and a "weird" outcome for her as she had never written a happy song in her life, having felt before like she needed her fear and woes to write. She said that not holding back while writing the album made her "feel really purified, like I've actually gotten a chance to break through instead of just wallowing in all of my problems. It's not about all the times that I've been afraid and tormented and sad, it's about looking at those situations and stomping them out. It feels really good to sing these songs now." Lee placed the song at the end of the album to symbolize its theme and a new beginning for herself.

According to the sheet music published on the website Musicnotes.com by Alfred Music Publishing, the song begins in the key of F minor, later modulating into C minor and then finally landing and remaining in C major, while Lee's vocals for the song range from the musical note of G_{3} to the note of E♭_{5}. The song is a piano ballad, with strings and "gentle" vocals from Lee, ending the album on a hopeful note. Jon Dolan from Entertainment Weekly felt that the song lyrically flirts with "the dark side". A writer for The Boston Globe described it as a "moment of romantic peace" with an "incongruously downtrodden groove". Writing in the St. Louis Post-Dispatch, Sara Berry said the song "lays bare Lee's insecurities in an intimate-sounding setting - just her and the piano."

The single was scheduled for release in Germany in a basic and premium format on December 14, 2007, but a release date was never officially announced.

== Critical reception ==
"Good Enough" received generally positive reviews from music critics. In his review of The Open Door, Ed Thompson of IGN stated that although Lee's voice gives the song "a funereal cast", it is lyrically optimistic, deeming it "the most unique song Lee has ever released" and "the most beautiful song on the album". Jon Dolan from Entertainment Weekly wrote that "the deceptively soft" song "flirts again with the dark side, offering 'Drink up sweet decadence / I can't say no to you' and striking a final note of cathartic badness." In The Daily Telegraph, Kathy McCabe said Lee's "newfound confidence" is evident in the track. Andree Farias of Christianity Today felt that the song "stands in contrast to everything else" in the album. A writer for The Boston Globe called it the "lone glimmer in the gloom" in which Lee showcases her "most unclenched and luxurious vocal to date". The Providence Journal's Rick Massimo thought the song is "rather melodramatic but melodically successful". Writing for the St. Louis Post-Dispatch, Sara Berry concluded that the album balanced the "scorching rock anthems" with "reflective, piano-heavy ballads" like "Lithium" and "Good Enough", adding that in the latter, Lee bares "insecurities in an intimate-sounding setting."

Richard Harrington of The Washington Post highlighted the track as a "quiet moment" in the album and thematically a "different creature". Blabbermouth.net's Don Kaye found the song to be a "melancholy ballad". A writer for Reuters regarded the song "as intense and affecting as anything before it - and this time, Amy Lee's lyric steps from the dark side, reveling in the relief of positivity." In The Courier-Mail, Jason Nahrung praised the song, calling it "sombrely arranged but lyrically uplifting". Blender writer Josh Eells viewed "Good Enough" as one of the album's "most touching moments" and "the sound of a woman who may have finally found true love — probably as close to contentment as a death-obsessed goth princess is going to get." Rolling Stone deemed it a "plaintive" ballad in which Lee's voice gives a "richness and nuance not present on [Fallen]". Writing for Metal Edge, Bryan Reesman said the song is "decidedly upbeat and showcases an Amy Lee that is letting someone in" and "the idea of an upbeat song closing the dark album actually makes sense". AllMusic's Stephen Thomas Erlewine called it a "brooding affirmation of a closer".

== Music video ==
The music video directed by Marc Webb and Rich Lee was filmed in Budapest, Hungary. A writer for MTV News found the video to be "dark and cinematic, it's almost as if you swallowed an entire feature length film in 3 minutes." Lee made a guest appearance on MTV's Total Request Live on September 10, 2007, to premiere the video.

== Formats and track listings ==
German CD single

1. "Good Enough" (Radio edit)
2. "Good Enough" (Acoustic from Intl Live)

Premium German maxi single

1. "Good Enough" (Radio edit)
2. "Good Enough" (Acoustic from Intl Live)
3. "Your Star" (Live from Tokyo)
4. "Good Enough" (Video)

== Credits and personnel ==
Credits for "Good Enough" are taken from The Open Door liner notes.

- Amy Lee – writing, vocals, keyboards, additional programming
- Dave Fortman – producing, audio mixing
- Jeremy Parker – audio engineering
- Mike Houge – assistant engineering
- Wesley Seidman – assistant engineering
- Ted Jensen – audio mastering
- DJ Lethal – programming
- Recorded at Record Plant Studios, Los Angeles
- Mixed at Ocean Way Studios, Los Angeles
- Mastered at Sterling Sound, New York
