= Oliver Goodwill =

British actor and film composer (born 1982)

- Born: 25 October 1982 (age 43); Swindon, Wiltshire, England
- Occupations: Actor, model, singer, songwriter, musician
- Years active: 2003–present
- Modelling information
- Height: 6 ft 1 in (1.85 m)
- Hair colour: Brown
- Eye colour: Blue
- Musical career
- Instruments: vocals, drums

Oliver James Goodwill (born 25 October 1982) is a British actor and film composer. He is known to have participated in the music video "Call Me When You're Sober" from the album The Open Door of the rock band Evanescence, and portrayed the main character on the TV series Runaway Stars. Goodwill also works in a band called "Melessa Jean", as a songwriter and drummer.

== Filmography ==
Feature films
Year	Title	Role	Notes
2006	Ella at Five		
2006	Prescriptions	Wilbur	TV series
2006	"Call Me When You're Sober"	love Interest	(music video)
2006	Entourage	Brother	("Sorry, Ari" / "What About Bob?")
2007	August	Nurse	(short)
2008	Richard III	York Subordinate	
2008	Dark Shadow		(short)
2008	Runaway Stars	Duncan	
2009	This Is Vegas	Main Character	(Video game)
2009	Change		
2010	Story	Tommy	
2011	Going Home		(short)
2011	Fight Night Champion	Sparring Partner	(Video Game)
