= Keep Coming Back =

Keep Coming Back can refer to:

- Keep Coming Back (album), an album by Marc Broussard
- "Keep Coming Back" (song), a song by Richard Marx
- "Keep Coming Back", a song by Edie Brickell & New Bohemians from Shooting Rubberbands at the Stars
- Keep Coming Back (film), a 2011 film with Jennifer Sciole

== See also ==
- I Keep Coming Back (disambiguation)
