= Karl Larsen =

American photographer (born 1968)

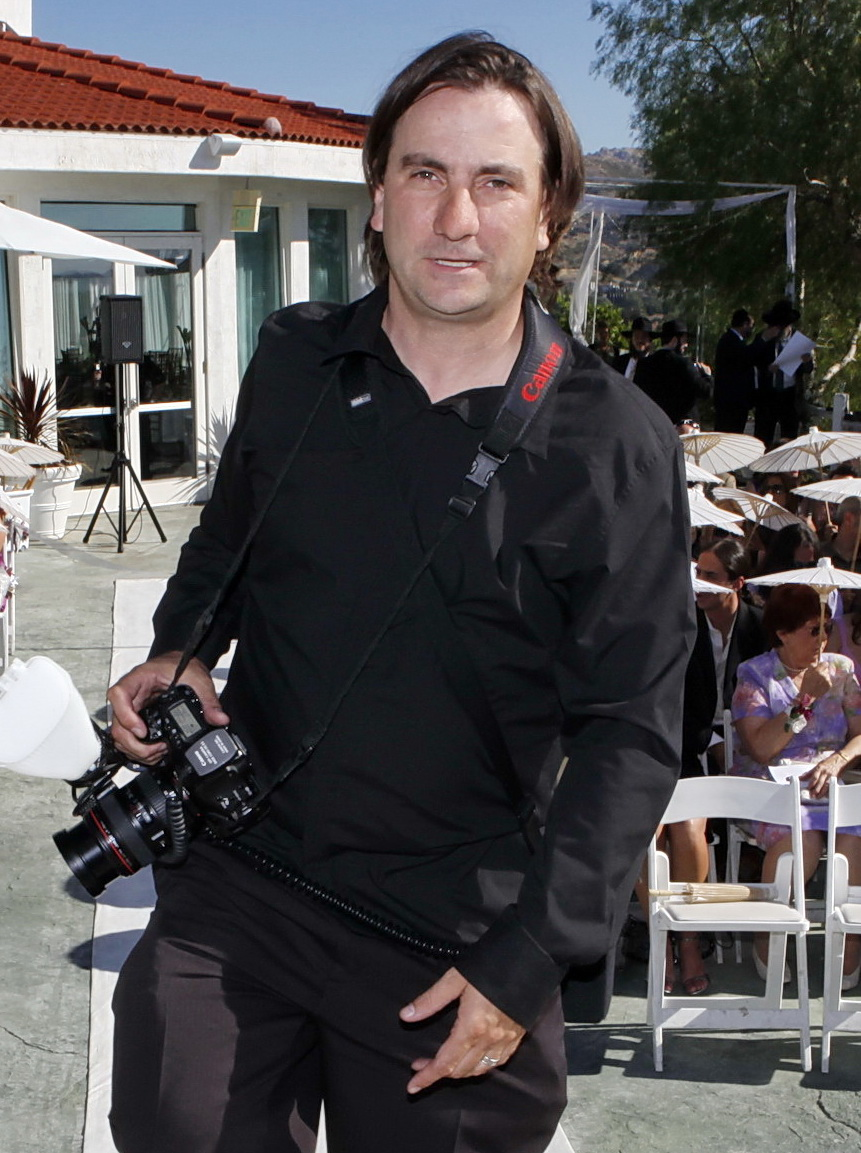
- Born: September 25, 1968 (age 58); Brooklyn, New York, U.S.
- Occupation: Photographer
- Spouse: Anelize Ferrer Flores (m. 2005)

Karl Larsen (born September 25, 1968) is an American photographer who is known for photographing several celebrities. His best known shot is one of Paris Hilton crying in the back of a police car after she was sentenced to serve time in jail for driving while intoxicated.

== Early life ==
Larsen was born in Brooklyn, New York, however, considers upstate Woodstock, New York his hometown. He graduated with a B.S. from Binghamton University in 1991.

== Career ==
Larsen started his professional career in 1997 by being the house photographer for the House of Blues in West Hollywood. Larsen would also shoot his friends in bands such as The Start and Stargunn on the Sunset Strip. His photos of a crying Paris Hilton in the back seat of a Los Angeles County Sheriff's cruiser on June 8, 2007 were published worldwide; however, Larsen was photographing Hilton alongside photographer Nick Ut. Two photographs emerged; the more famous photo of Hilton was credited to Ut despite being Larsen's photo.

=== Rolling Stone magazine ===
Larsen has been a contributing photographer for Rolling Stone magazine since 2002, taking portraits of bands from The Doors of the 21st Century to Velvet Revolver. However, Larsen, is best known for his live concert contributions by being sent on assignments from nationwide to Europe to Canada and to Japan from Farm Aid and to the world's largest concert ever, The Rolling Stones on the Copacabana Beach in Rio de Janeiro, Brazil in 2006.

== Personal life ==
Larsen married Brazilian native Anelize Ferrer Flores in 2005. They currently live in Hollywood, California.

In 2022, Larsen began publishing videos on the YouTube channel Remarkable Friendship together with photographer Thomas Markle, although Markle claims to have severed their relationship after recording their last video.

== Filmography ==
Year	Title	Role	More information
Television
2007	Bodog Music Battle of the Bands	Himself	Episode 7 - Los Angeles: Part 2
Film
1995	Mortal Kombat	Technical assistant	
2008	Balancing the Books	Still photographer	
2009	The Devil Within	Still photographer	
Music videos
2003	"Fall to Pieces"	Still photographer	Velvet Revolver
2004	"Sucker Train Blues"	Still photographer	Velvet Revolver
2006	"National Lampoon's Van Wilder: The Rise of Taj"sound track	Still photographer	Jonny Lives!
2006	"Crazy Bitch"	Still photographer	Buckcherry
2006	"Next 2 You"	Still photographer	Buckcherry
2006	"Dark Blue"	Still photographer	Jack's Mannequin
2006	"Call Me When You're Sober"	Still photographer	Evanescence
2006	"Lithium"	Still photographer	Evanescence
2007	"Clothes Off!!"	Still photographer	Gym Class Heroes

== Books ==
Title	ISBN	Date Published
Slash	ISBN 978-0-06-135142-6	2007
It's So Easy: And Other Lies	ISBN 978-1-4516-0663-8	2011
