= Richard III (2007 film) =

2007 American film

- film poster
- Directed by: Scott M. Anderson
- Written by: Scott M. Anderson
- Based on: Richard III by William Shakespeare
- Produced by: David Carradine; Scott M. Anderson
- Starring: Scott M. Anderson; David Carradine; Danny Trejo; Richard Tyson; Anne Jeffreys; María Conchita Alonso; Sung Hi Lee
- Cinematography: Ruben Russ
- Music by: Penka Kouneva
- Release date: April 27, 2007 (World Fest Houston)
- Country: United States
- Language: English

Richard III is a 2007 crime drama film written and directed by Scott M. Anderson, set in contemporary Hollywood as a modern-day retelling of William Shakespeare's Richard III.

Filming took place over a three-week period in 2005, with post-production taking place in 2006. The film's world premiere was April 27, 2007, at World Fest Houston, where it won Platinum Awards for "First Feature Film" for Scott Anderson and "Best Film Score" for Penka Kouneva.

== Cast ==
- David Carradine as Henry Stafford, 2nd Duke of Buckingham
- Sally Kirkland as Queen Margaret
- María Conchita Alonso as Queen Elizabeth
- Scott M. Anderson as Richard III
- Anne Jeffreys as Duchess of York
- Richard Tyson as George, Duke of Clarence
- Sung Hi Lee as Anne Neville
- Natalie Burn as Natasha
- Marco Sanchez as Richmond
- Mike Muscat as Archbishop
- Daniela Melgoza as Princess Elizabeth
- Steven Williams as Lord Stanley
- Navid Negahban as Sir James Tyrrel
- Jennifer Sciole as Margaret
- Miranda Kwok as Portia
- Danny Trejo as Major
- Annie Little as Herbert
- Tim Storms as Lord Norfolk
- Tyson Sullivan as York Subordinate
- Dee Mas as The York Subordinate and Silloette Fighter/Dancer
- Tammy Barr as Noble daughter
- Luca Bercovici as Brackenbury
- Kathleen Davis as Club Goer
- Vincent De Paul as Lancaster FBI Guard
- Oliver Goodwill as York Subordinate
- Kym Jackson as Dukes Escort
- Peter Jason as Ringside Announcer
- TQ as DJ
- Bruno Oliver as The Keeper

== Accolades ==
In 2007 it won Platinum Awards for "First Feature Film" for Scott Anderson and "Best Film Score" for Penka Kouneva at the 40th Worldfest Independent Film Festival.

== See also ==
- Richard III
- Shakespeare on screen
