= Tammy Barr =

American actress

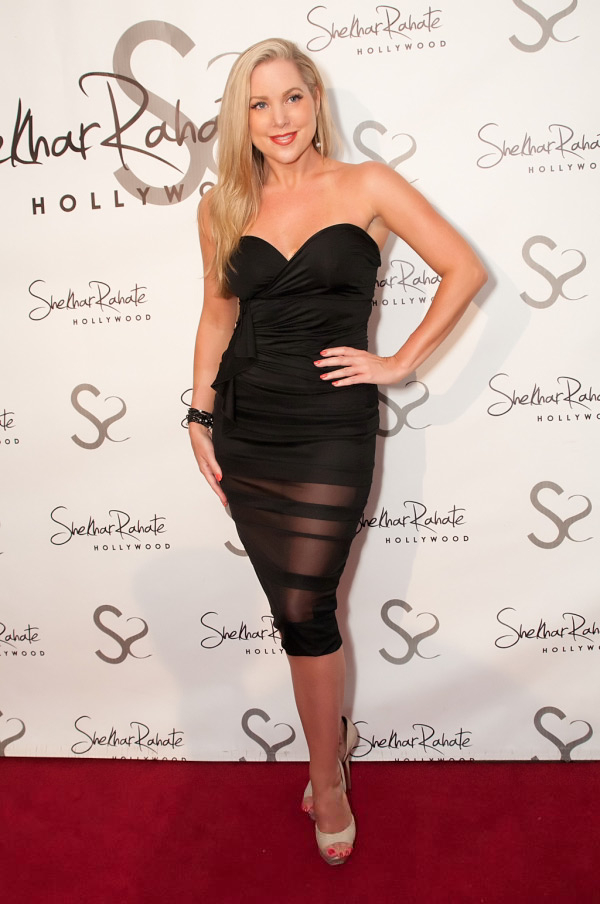
- Occupation: Actress
- Years active: 2001–present

Tammy Barr is an American actress, model and voice-over artist. She is best known for portraying the character young Patty Williams in flashback scenes on The Young and the Restless . She made her screen debut in Richard III alongside David Carradine and also played the wife of Mark Cuban in his sketch spoof The Cubans. Her first leading role in a film was opposite Lorenzo Lamas in the thriller Backstabber. She played the wife of Daniel Baldwin in A Little Christmas Business and was a Looping Artist on the Terrence Malick film, Red Wing.
