= I Keep Coming Back =

I Keep Coming Back may refer to:

- "I Keep Coming Back" (Razzy Bailey song), a 1980 song by Razzy Bailey
- "I Keep Coming Back" (Josh Gracin song), a 2007 song by Josh Gracin
- "I Keep Coming Back", a song on the 1970 album Turn Back the Hands of Time by Tyrone Davis, also covered by the Afghan Whigs
- I Keep Comin' Back!, a 1966 album by saxophonist Sonny Stitt

== See also ==
- Keep Coming Back (disambiguation)
