= Patty Williams =

Fictional character from The Young and the Restless

- The Young and the Restless character
- Stacy Haiduk as Patty Williams
- Portrayed by: Tammy Taylor (1980); Lilibet Stern (1980–1983); Andrea Evans (1983–1984); Stacy Haiduk (2009–present); Tammy Barr (2009 flashbacks)
- Duration: 1980–1984; 2009–2012; 2015–2016; 2026
- First appearance: March 26, 1980
- Created by: William J. Bell
- Introduced by: John Conboy (1980); Maria Arena Bell and Paul Rauch (2009); Jill Farren Phelps and Charles Pratt, Jr. (2015); Josh Griffith and Sally McDonald (2026)
In-universe information
- Other names: Patty Williams Abbott; Mary Jane Benson; Emily Peterson; Myrna Murdock
- Occupation: Businesswoman; Consultant; Housekeeper
- Family: Williams
- Father: Carl Williams
- Mother: Mary Williams
- Brothers: Paul Williams; Todd Williams; Steven Williams
- Spouse: Jack Abbott (1982–1984, 2010)
- Nephews: Ricky Williams; Dylan McAvoy
- Nieces: Heather Stevens

Patty Williams is a fictional character from the American CBS soap opera The Young and the Restless. The character made her debut in 1980 and, after a brief portrayal by Tammy Taylor, Lilibet Stern took over for three years, followed by Andrea Evans until 1984. The character was re-introduced by former head writer Maria Arena Bell 25 years later in 2009, with Stacy Haiduk taking over the role. She appeared sporadically for an additional three years, and then returned from 2015 to November 2016. Much of Patty's history revolves around her romance with Jack Abbott, and her rivalries with other women that were competitor for Jack's love, such as; Jill Foster, Diane Jenkins, Phyllis Summers, Emily Peterson and Genevieve Atkinson. She also suffers from difficult mental health issues which was expressed among other things in her obsession with Jack, and in the crimes that she committed in order to get him.

== Casting ==
The role was originated by actress Tammy Taylor in 1980, who left soon after her debut and was immediately replaced with Lilibet Stern, who remained in the role until May 1983. Following Stern's departure, the role was recast with Andrea Evans, who portrayed the role from May 12, 1983 to October 1984.

In 2009, Stacy Haiduk began portraying "Mary Jane Benson," later revealed to be Patty. During this storyline, actress Tammy Barr portrayed Patty in flashbacks. In October 2009, Haiduk began portraying dual roles as Patty and Emily Peterson. In June 2010, it was announced that Haiduk had been let go from The Young and the Restless. She made her last appearance on August 6, 2010. In 2011, it was announced that Haiduk would be reprising the role, with her return beginning on October 24, 2011. In March 2012, speculation arose that Haiduk had finished her stint with the soap opera. In a response to a fan on her Facebook page, Haiduk stated: "I am not sure what Y&R is doing. I am a bit disappointed, so I don't know what to tell you. They just didn't want to write for me, I guess." However, seven months later, it was announced on Haiduk's web page that she would be returning on September 20, 2012, which occurred for one week. In 2013, when asked of her current status with the soap opera, Haiduk stated: "As you see, I come back and leave, I come back and leave."

In August 2015, it was announced that Haiduk will once again reprise her role as Patty, airing on September 21. In November 2016, it was announced that Haiduk had wrapped up her stint as Patty, last airing November 8. In February 2026, it was announced Haiduk would again reprise to the role; she returned during the March 6 episode.

== Storylines ==
=== 1980–1984 ===
Patty fell in love with Jabot heir Jack Abbott, much to her parents' disapproval. A jealous Jill Foster then confesses to Patty that she and Jack have been secret lovers. A furious Jack fires Jill from Jabot. Patty then accepts a date from Danny Romalotti.

Patty and Jack Abbott (pictured) at their wedding in 1982.

Patty eventually leaves Danny and becomes involved with Jack again. Patty's father, Carl, tries to break up the union, and Jack retaliates by marrying Patty in June 1982. Patty soon becomes suspicious that Jack is only interested in her for sex. Jack, meanwhile, begins seeing Diane Jenkins behind Patty's back. When Patty catches Jack and Diane together in his office, she is so traumatized that she trips over a plant in the lobby and miscarries. When Patty recovers, she tells Jack she wants another child. Later she overhears Jack telling Jill of his plans to have a vasectomy, and that he only married Patty so that his father, John Abbott, would make him president of Jabot. This sends Patty over the edge and she arrives at Jack's office with a loaded gun to kill herself in front of Jack. Jack admits to Patty that he has been cruel to her, and begs her not to shoot herself, but to shoot him. Patty shoots Jack three times.

Patty temporarily loses all memory of the shooting. Jack survives and is paralyzed in a hospital bed for some time. Patty's father Carl is the police detective in charge of finding Jack's attacker and becomes convinced Jill has done it. Only Jack knows that Patty shot him. After the truth comes out, Jack refuses to press charges and attempts to reconcile with her. Patty decides to divorce him. She then becomes involved again with Danny. However, Danny soon marries a pregnant Traci Abbott, even though he is not the father, to give the child a name. Traci tells Patty that the marriage is only temporary until the baby is born and they will get a divorce. As the pregnancy progresses, Traci begins to fall in love with Danny and when Patty confronts her, she accidentally causes Traci to fall down the stairs and miscarry. Seeing no future with Danny, who blames her for the loss of Traci's child, Patty leaves town.

=== 2009–2010 ===
Patty returns to town 25 years later, operating under the alias Mary Jane Benson. Flashback scenes in Mary Jane Benson's dreams of young Patty reveal that she is indeed Patty Williams. Victor Newman paid for Patty to undergo plastic surgery to look like her psychiatrist, Emily Peterson, in order to infiltrate Jabot and get close to Jack. Victor's plan backfires as Patty becomes unstable and commits a number of illegal acts in her pursuit of Jack. Patty goes into hiding after causing Summer Newman to have an allergic reaction to peanuts in an attempt to keep Phyllis Newman away from Jack. While in hiding, Patty takes Colleen Carlton hostage. In an effort to escape, Colleen gets into a boat and rows away, only to fall into the water. Victor and Jack corner Patty in the woods and attempt to save Colleen. Patty shoots Victor before being taken to a mental institution. Colleen eventually dies. Emily Peterson arrives in Genoa City to treat Patty. Jack is initially hostile towards her because of her resemblance to Patty, but they eventually fall in love and plan to marry. When Patty discovers this, Patty retaliates by knocking Emily out and takes her place at the wedding, leaving Emily in her cell at the mental institution. Patty struggles to keep others from discovering the truth about the switch, but her erratic behavior makes Jack and Phyllis suspicious. Jack discovers the truth after finding Patty's diary. To keep up the facade, she once again switches places with Emily, right before Jack gets to the mental institution. The ruse fails, and Jack attempts to reunite with Emily.

In 2010, Victor's devious son Adam Newman was believed to be killed, but it eventually turned out that the man, who burned in a fire was Richard Hightower, who had Adam's DNA because of a transplant from him. After Adam is the prime suspect in Hightower's murder case, it is believed that it was indeed Patty who killed Hightower, believing that he was Adam. She has vivid memories of the night and remembers specific details on how she stabbed Richard. Patty was also responsible for the gas leak at the Masquerade ball and the explosion that occurred right after. With the help of her diary, Patty realized she did not kill Richard Hightower; however, Adam snuck into the mental institution to once again mess with Patty's mind in making her believe she did kill Richard Hightower and switched notes in her diary while Patty was asleep. When Patty awoke, Adam convinced her he was Hightower and led her out of the mental institution through the vents and sent her off to Canada to become a nun and convinced her to never return to Genoa City. On August 6, 2010, Patty called Paul saying that she was not going to return to Genoa City and that she loves him. Paul later informed Emily and Jack that she called him and traced the call to somewhere in South America. Patty was last seen with red hair flirting with a man named Alejandro, and she suggested that he call her Mary Jane and him Jack.

=== 2011–2012 ===
In 2011, a mystery guest appears outside the Abbott mansion, where Diane Jenkins is trying to seduce Jack. The mysterious person was rumored to be Nikki Newman, as she disappeared from rehab. Diane is murdered only hours later and in October a mystery person is text messaging from the phone of detective Ronan Malloy to confront the suspects in Diane's murder. During an explosion at the home of Genevieve Atkinson, her housekeeper Myrna Murdock is found with burns in her face. The woman is later shown with a cat tattoo on her leg. As Jack appears to be good friends with Genevieve, kissing her on the cheek, Myrna is seen upset. Meanwhile, Genevieve feels terrible over what happened to Myrna and promises to take care of her. While having her face bandaged, Jack tries to talk to Myrna, but she would not answer him. As she later reveals her face to Genevieve it is seen that Myrna is in fact Patty.

It is later revealed that Patty made a film to taunt the nine suspects in the murder of Diane, as well as individually torturing Ashley Abbott and Nick Newman by calling them and playing the recordings she made of their confrontations with Diane in the park. Patty remained under the alias Myrna Murdock, working for Genevieve, who by this point is dating Jack. Patty attempts to break them up several times, such as poisoning their meals on Thanksgiving. When Jack proposed to Genevieve and she accepted, Patty later went ballistic, and ripped the blanket that Jack and Genevieve had sex on to pieces. She was later seen sewing a pillow that read, "Alcohol doesn't get you drunk, bartenders do." Afterward, she tossed it into the nearby fireplace. It is then revealed that perhaps Patty sewed all the pillows that were left in Diane's room at the Genoa City Athletic Club the night of her murder. On New Year's Eve, Patty sneaks into Gloworm to spy on Jack and Genevieve. Later on, she poisons their glasses of champagne, and Jack begins to feel extremely tired. Genevieve brings him home to rest, where "Myrna" then creates a diversion, causing Genevieve to leave. While gone, Patty gets into bed with Jack and starts talking to him. When Jack wakes up, Patty is gone and her cat is lying next to him. He thinks the whole ordeal was a dream. Patty continues to attempt to divert Genevieve from Jack by making things up by telling her the house alarm keeps going off. As a result, Genevieve went to stay with Jack and wanted "Myrna" to come with her, though she was able to convince Genevieve that she would be fine at her house. Genevieve has Ronan investigate the bizarre occurrences at her house and he requests to speak with "Myrna"; however, Patty continues to divert him, one time by posting a ripped page from Diane's diary on his windshield to keep him from questioning her. Shortly after Patty's brother Paul arrives at Genevieve's house to question "Myrna", however, she had already fled the house, leaving behind the laptop she used while working for Genevieve. Paul later discovers the security camera pictures of Ashley pushing Diane to the ground on "Myrna"'s laptop, leading into a search for her.

After hiding in the shed at the Newman Ranch for a while, Patty goes to the Genoa City Athletic Club and poses as Emily. She tries to convince Jack not to marry Genevieve, though when Jack attempts to let the two meet, Patty quickly flees. The next day, Tucker McCall discovers Patty at Crimson Lights, again assuming she is Emily. Patty continues to pose as Emily and goes to Jack's house to speak with him, hours before his wedding with Genevieve. She attempts to win him back saying that their happiness was thwarted by Patty, however Jack turns her down nicely and she leaves. Patty becomes quite aggravated afterwards, and she returns to the shed and pulls a pistol, presumably to shoot Genevieve. However, Adam finds her in the shed and tries to persuade her not to shoot Genevieve or anyone else, though she throws acid in his face before hitting him over the head with a piece of wood, fleeing as Adam remains unconscious. Patty arrives at Genevieve's house to find her writing a Dear John letter to Jack. As Patty hides in her house, she watches Genevieve hand the letter in an envelope with various other things that Jack gave Genevieve to a delivery man so he can deliver it to the church where they were going to marry. Patty then steals Genevieve's wedding dress and arrives at the church attempting to convince the delivery man she is Jack's personal assistant; however, he does not believe her and she knocks him unconscious. Now dressed in Genevieve's dress, Patty walks down the aisle to the altar with her face covered, and as Jack reveals her face, he thinks it is Emily, though Patty becomes enraged by that fact and reveals that she is Patty before shooting Jack in the stomach.

At the same time of all this, Deacon Sharpe reveals to Paul and Ronan that he spoke to the woman they are searching for, as well as telling them she was obsessed with cats, leading Paul to realize that "Myrna" is Patty, and she is involved in Diane's murder. Patty decided to hide in her brother Todd's church where she meets nephew Ricky Williams, who promised to protect her. However that was all a scam, Ricky was just doing it to write an article for Restless Style on Patty and Jack. Shortly after Ronan and Paul find them, and Patty is escorted to the police station and was imprisoned. Shortly after, she is moved to a high-security prison for attempted murder. Patty returned briefly when Paul visited her to ask her who helped her break out of the mental facility in 2010; she told him it was Adam. At the same time, Patty told Paul that she was having a repressed memory of shooting Jack which brought her to tears, but Paul comforted her and told her it was all a dream. Seven months later, Patty reappeared when Paul arranged for her to move to Fairview Psychiatric Hospital for her to receive the appropriate treatment, and he was discouraged to find out that his sister's condition had not improved. During Paul's visit, Patty was able to distract the doctors to allow for Paul to sneak into Daisy Carter's room, whom he needed to question regarding his upcoming murder trial. When Daisy suddenly disappeared, Paul was told that her mother checked her out of Fairview, leading to confusion as Sheila Carter had died five years prior. When Paul asked Patty if she saw the mystery person who left with Daisy, Patty's response possibly links her to Daisy's disappearance. In June 2017, Sheila Carter reappears in Los Angeles, revealing herself to Quinn Fuller. This reveals that Sheila is still alive, and Patty probably helped her get Daisy discharged from the hospital.

=== 2015–2016, 2026 ===
Patty meets Sharon Newman at Fairview Psychiatric Hospital, where she had checked herself in for evaluation and where Patty had continued to reside. Sharon, who had suffered a miscarriage prior to her admittance, was put in the care of Dr. Sandra Anderson, who ended up drugging Sharon so heavily that she believed she was still pregnant. Patty, who had been witnessing Dr. Anderson's actions, was repeatedly silenced and locked up by other orderlies so that she would not reveal what Dr. Anderson was doing. As a result, Patty escapes Fairview in order to find Dylan McAvoy, her newfound nephew and Sharon's husband, at a Halloween party at the Newman Enterprises tower and tell him that Sharon is not really pregnant and Dr. Anderson is purposely mistreating her. However, Patty ends up finding Jack at the party and attacking him and his wife, Phyllis Abbott. When a fire breaks out in the tower, panic ensues and Jack later informs Paul that he and Phyllis encountered Patty, leading to a search for her, but when her body is not found, she is presumed dead. However, Patty is soon shown to be alive in the remains of the building, encountering evil mastermind and the person behind the fire, Ian Ward, who tells her to come on the run with him. Soon after, Patty and Ian are seen in a motel room, where he tells her she must come up with a new name for herself if she is going to go along with him.

Several months later, Paul is informed that Patty was found by police living on the street after Ian abandoned her. He consoles her and ultimately sends her back to Fairview, to which she is extremely reluctant as she is scared of Dr. Anderson. Meanwhile, Sharon, who had seemingly given birth to a son and was now home with Dylan, had large gaps in her memory of her time at Fairview as well as the night she supposedly gave birth, still being heavily drugged. Patty deduces that Sharon was in fact never pregnant and the child is actually that of Sharon's ex-husband Nick; Dr. Anderson had arranged for the boy to be stolen from Genoa City Memorial Hospital and have a nurse tell Nicholas and his wife Sage Warner that their son died. Dr. Anderson is then revealed to in fact be Sandra Allen, a woman who once suffered an injury at a party thrown by Nicholas at the Newman ranch when they were younger and she stole his child as revenge. Patty confronts Dr. Anderson, who laments that this is true while preparing to stab Patty with a syringe. Patty, however, ends up stabbing and killing Dr. Anderson with a letter opener in self-defense when she comes after her, but the incident ultimately sends her into a catatonic state and she is unable to reveal any of the information she knows to Paul, Sharon, Dylan, Nick or Sage. As a result, Patty is moved to a facility with higher security; Sharon later goes to visit her with questions about her time at Fairview when she was supposedly pregnant, during which Patty tells her she was never pregnant and it was all a ruse orchestrated by Dr. Anderson. Months later, during which Sharon continued to pass Nick and Sage's child off as her own, a more vibrant Patty begins contacting Sharon from the facility, threatening to reveal her secret to everyone. Sharon, however, manages to steal the cell phone Patty was using so that she would not be able to contact her or anyone else further, hoping that would put an end to the threats. However, Patty still manages to contact Nick and reveals the truth to him. Paul also visits his sister and presses her for details, during which she also reveals the truth to him.

In 2026, Patty reappears to Jack, who is being held captive on a yacht. She reveals that she has undergone extensive therapy and medical treatment for her mental health issues and has been rehabilitated. Patty agrees to give Jack a tour of the yacht in exchange for a kiss.
