= Sweet Sacrifice =

Single by Evanescence

from the album The Open Door
- Released: May 25, 2007
- Recorded: 2006
- Studio: Record Plant, Los Angeles
- Length: 3:05
- Label: Wind-up
- Songwriters: Amy Lee; Terry Balsamo
- Producer: Dave Fortman

Evanescence singles chronology
| "Lithium" (2006) | "Sweet Sacrifice" (2007) | "Good Enough" (2007) |

Music video
- "Sweet Sacrifice" on YouTube

"Sweet Sacrifice" is a song by American rock band Evanescence from their second studio album, The Open Door. It was released on May 25, 2007, as the album's third single. The song was written by Amy Lee and Terry Balsamo, and produced by Dave Fortman. It is about coming out of the abusive relationship that inspired much of Lee's writing on the debut album. "Sweet Sacrifice" received generally positive reviews by critics, and was nominated for Best Hard Rock Performance at the 50th Grammy Awards. Its music video was directed by P.R. Brown.

== Background and release ==
"Sweet Sacrifice" was written by Amy Lee and Terry Balsamo, with production handled by Dave Fortman. "All That I'm Living For" was originally chosen by the label as the album's third single, but after pressure from the band and their fandom, "Sweet Sacrifice" replaced it as the third single. The single was first released in Germany on May 25, 2007.

== Composition ==
The main theme of the song is moving forward from an abusive relationship. Lee described it as being "almost sarcastic" to herself as she "needs to stop being that sweet sacrifice". She said of her inspiration for the song,

It's the one song on The Open Door that's about the same abusive relationship which was the source of all the songs on Fallen. It was appropriate to put this song at the beginning, but it comes from a much stronger standpoint than Fallen. It's not saying, "I'm trapped in fear and somebody save me." It's saying, "Fear is only in our minds ... I'm not afraid anymore."

According to the sheet music published on the website Musicnotes.com by Alfred Music Publishing, "Sweet Sacrifice" was written in the key of F♯ minor and Lee's vocals for the song range from the musical note of A#_{3} to G_{5}. IGN's Ed Thompson said the song is underscored by Lee's "haunting vocals and dark lyrics" alongside a "deep, rumbling guitar", strings, and a layer of programming. Sam Law of Kerrang! musically described it as "a hail of nervy guitars and tense strings fall[ing] around Lee's wild-eyed performance." Sara Berry of St. Louis Post-Dispatch wrote that it "features disquieting lines like 'I dream in darkness/I sleep to die/Erase the silence/Erase my life.'"

== Critical reception ==
In his review of The Open Door, Ed Thompson of IGN highlighted the song as the "best track" on the album. Bill Lamb of the website About.com named it one of the top tracks on The Open Door. The Washington Post's Richard Harrington wrote that "There's no shortage of soaring, dynamic rockers on 'The Open Door,' including "Sweet Sacrifice"". Sara Berry of St. Louis Post-Dispatch said the song's "disquieting lines" are "par for the course on this lineup of overwhelmingly melancholy compositions. Still, it's well-executed music, and it's an ideal soundtrack for life's moodier moments." Writing for Entertainment Weekly Jon Dolan found the song to be a "bruising breakup lament that turns into an anthem of freedom." Melissa Maerz of Spin said the song reveals "an angrier, more self-assured who waxes sardonic". Kerrang!'s Sam Law wrote that it is the sound of Lee "revelling in the ability to turn that pain into something positive as a hail of nervy guitars and tense strings fall around Lee's wild-eyed performance." Dannii Leivers of Metal Hammer complimented Lee's songwriting. "Sweet Sacrifice" was nominated for Best Hard Rock Performance at the 50th Grammy Awards.

== Music video ==
Screenshot from the "Sweet Sacrifice"

A music video directed by P.R. Brown was filmed in Burbank, California, between March 9 and March 10, 2007. The music video leaked onto the Internet on April 4, 2007, after briefly being available for digital download on iTunes Store. It initially premiered on Yahoo! Music on April 5. The video's set was inspired by the psychological thriller film The Cell (2000) directed by Tarsem Singh. Lee said it is "like we're in the walls of our minds". In an interview with MTV News, she described the video as "mostly live performance. It's not so much fluff and flying and tricks and wolves and stuff. It's more really just about the song ... It's gonna be sort of like a video within the video." Sam Law of Kerrang! wrote that the video "added another layer of strained texture and cutting catharsis." The video peaked at number eight on MTV's Total Request Live in April 2007.

== Track listing ==
There are two versions of the single that have been released, they have different photos by Amy V. Cooper.

Basic Maxi CD (Part 1)

- "Sweet Sacrifice" (Album version) - 3:05
- "Weight of the World" (Live from Tokyo) - 3:44

Premium Maxi CD (Part 2)

- "Sweet Sacrifice" (Album version) - 3:05
- "Weight of the World" (Live from Tokyo) - 3:44
- "Sweet Sacrifice" (Radio mix) - 3:03
- Interview with Amy Lee and John LeCompt* - 5:07

== Credits and personnel ==
Album credits are taken from The Open Door liner notes.

- Amy Lee - vocals, piano, additional programming
- Terry Balsamo - guitar
- John LeCompt - guitar
- Will Boyd - bass
- Rocky Gray - drums
- Dave Fortman - producing, audio mixing
- Jeremy Parker - audio engineering
- Mike Houge - assistant engineering
- Wesley Seidman - assistant engineering
- Ted Jensen - audio mastering
- DJ Lethal - programming
- David Campbell - orchestral arrangement

== Charts ==
| Chart (2007) | Peak position |
|---|---|
| Turkey (Türkiye Top 20) | 11 |
| Germany (Official German Charts) | 75 |
| Greece (IFPI Greece) | 13 |
| US Mainstream Rock (Billboard) | 24 |

== Release history ==
| Country | Date | Format | Label |
|---|---|---|---|
| Austria | May 25, 2007 | Digital download | Sony |
| Germany | May 25, 2007 | CD single | Sony |
| Germany | May 25, 2007 | Maxi single | Sony |
| Germany | May 25, 2007 | Digital download | Sony |
