= The Open Door =

Studio album by Evanescence
- Released: September 25, 2006
- Recorded: September 2005 – March 2006
- Studios: Record Plant, Los Angeles
- Genres: Alternative metal; gothic metal; industrial rock; symphonic metal; gothic rock
- Length: 54:10
- Label: Wind-up
- Producer: Dave Fortman

Evanescence chronology
Anywhere but Home (2004)	The Open Door (2006)	Evanescence (2011)

Singles from The Open Door
- 1. "Call Me When You're Sober" Released: September 4, 2006; 2. "Lithium" Released: December 4, 2006; 3. "Sweet Sacrifice" Released: May 25, 2007; 4. "Good Enough" Released: December 14, 2007

The Open Door is the second studio album by American rock band Evanescence, released on September 25, 2006 by Wind-up Records. Singer-keyboardist Amy Lee had full creative control of the record, incorporating new elements into their previous musical styles, including her classical influences, homemade sounds, industrial rock, symphonic metal, progressive rock, electronica and the use of choirs on several songs. Most of the songs were co-composed by Lee and guitarist Terry Balsamo, with production handled by Dave Fortman. The album was written in the course of 18 months, and the recording process was delayed as a result of Balsamo's stroke.

The Open Door received generally positive reviews from music critics. The song "Sweet Sacrifice" received a Grammy Award nomination for Best Hard Rock Performance, and the album won Album of the Year at the MTV Australia Video Music Awards. The Open Door debuted at number one on the U.S Billboard 200, selling more than 447,000 copies in its first week. It also topped the charts in Australia, Europe, Germany, Greece and Switzerland, and reached the top five in over 15 countries. The album was certified platinum by the RIAA just over a month after its release, and has since been certified double platinum. As of 2011, it has sold more than six million copies worldwide.

"Call Me When You're Sober" was released digitally as the album's lead single on September 4, 2006. The song peaked at number 10 on the Billboard Hot 100 and charted in the top 10 of multiple countries internationally. "Lithium" was released as the second single on December 4, 2006, and "Sweet Sacrifice" was released as the third international single from the album on May 25, 2007. "Good Enough" was released in Germany as the final single on December 14, 2007. The Open Door was supported by a worldwide tour that ran from October 2006 to December 2007.

== Background ==
Lee stated that Evanescence would begin writing material for the second album in March 2004, after finishing the tour for Fallen (2003). She said that it was "impossible to write on tour and [writing is] the one thing I love more than anything else about my job", adding that "everybody's just ready to stop touring and go back to the studio". In reference to the album's title, Lee said: "I feel like I have the ability to do a lot of things I couldn't do before, for a number of reasons ... A lot of doors have kind of been opened in my life—not just since everything has happened for us." The album cover, which was designed by Lee, was posted on Evanescence's official website on August 4, 2006.

== Writing and recording ==
"I feel like with Fallen, a lot of those songs sound like I was trying to prove myself and establish what we were and our sound. I was trapped having to feel a certain way. But with the new record, I sort of went with everything. I am not afraid to feel happy sometimes, and I think there's moments on the album with sensuality, which is really fun and beautiful, instead of the last time, where I felt like I was only getting out part of me. This record embraces the whole me."

— Amy Lee talking about The Open Door with MTV News.

The Open Door was written in 18 months. Lee composed nine songs with guitarist Terry Balsamo, "All That I'm Living For" with guitarist John LeCompt, and was the sole composer of "Like You", "Lithium" and "Good Enough".

Lee confessed that after former guitarist Ben Moody's departure, she was not restrained in the writing process and Balsamo was open minded; the two collaborated and he encouraged her to do something she would not have done with Moody. Lee was "finally creating in the same room with someone" when working with Balsamo, as previously she and Moody wrote separately as they "could never really sit in the same room and create" and had major creative differences. After his exit, she felt she reclaimed a creative freedom, and found it "liberating not to have someone standing over me constantly shooting my ideas down". "I was really looking forward to being able to trust", she said. Deeming writing a vulnerable process, Lee only wrote music by herself in the past, and this album was the first time she wrote music with another person. She had free rein and could try anything "without being judged", and the studio was a "free place where we could just be musicians and see what came out". Lee called her and Balsamo's musical partnership healthy and productive, stating that there was "no pressure of wanting to rule the world" and they were "having fun with it for a change".

Lee went through a spectrum of emotions throughout her experiences before and during the creation of The Open Door. She said that the making of the album was "really intense" and she came out "feeling purified". She and Balsamo began working together at her rented home in California. After experiencing cabin fever, they rented a place in Florida, where they finished the album. Lee wrote her musical parts and Balsamo made "beautiful guitar weavings around what I was doing". The two would also "sit in a room and jam". They approached the songs in various way; aside from programming and keyboard melodies, some songs would begin with a bassline, guitar line, or vocal melody. Lee engineered demos for the songs and she and Balsamo worked with Pro Tools to be in control of what went on the album. As she had full control of the process this time around, she could do a lot more things than before "as a singer, as a music writer, even as an engineer". Lee said the songs she was working on for the album "still sound like the Evanescence everybody knows, but at the same time it's going in a new direction, and I love that direction."

The Open Door was recorded from September 2005 to March 2006 at Record Plant Studios in Los Angeles, California. In October 2005, as the album was being recorded and he was in the studio, Balsamo suffered a stroke from a torn neck artery, and the left side of his body was paralyzed. Lee recalled the "horrifying" experience as it took over 12 hours for him to be able to receive an MRI, "meanwhile, the first 12 hours after a stroke, long-term effects are happening". She called his recovery a "huge miracle" after doctors did not think he would ever be able to play guitar again. Balsamo began physical therapy and the process of re-training his hand to play, stating that he was determined to overcome the paralysis. Lee considered his stroke to have been "the most difficult part" of the album process. Everything that occurred during the making of the record became inspiration and fuel for it, and made it "a really special" record.

The record was produced and mixed by Dave Fortman at Ocean Way Studios. Jeremy Parker handled the audio engineering, Mike Houge and Wesley Seidman served as additional engineers, and Ted Jensen mastered the record at Sterling Sound, New York. The choral arrangements were made by Lee and recorded at Capitol Studios in California, with the choir and strings recorded in an old chapel near Seattle, Washington. DJ Lethal programmed on every song on the album with Lee doing additional programming. John LeCompt is credited with additional programming on "Call Me When You're Sober" and "All That I'm Living For", which was programmed by Bon Harris. David Campbell completed the orchestral arrangements, which were performed by Seattlemusic.

== Music and lyrics ==
In an interview with Rolling Stone, Lee called the album "a complete spectrum of darkness and scary stuff and emotion". She told The Washington Post:

"So much has changed in my life - I was going through so many things in the making of the record, and before the making of the record. ... I just wanted to create and do something different and branch out. At the heart of it I know it's still Evanescence and it's still me, but structurally it's a lot more fun. ... I think it's more mature and more brave all around; it's like the instruments actually go together, the piano and guitar and vocals, since they're written together - they intertwine. It's definitely even more personal. At least for me, because I was there, it sounds more fun because I was having so much more fun."

"I just didn't hold back this time, and writing that way has made me feel really purified, like I've actually gotten a chance to break through instead of just wallowing in all of my problems."

— Amy Lee on her more candid lyrical approach for The Open Door.

Lee said that she pushed herself and implemented things she didn't have the courage to do in Fallen. She also said her goal was to make a record that she loved even more than Fallen, rather than to copy the formula which made the previous record successful. Lee incorporated her classical influences and new elements in the music, including home-made sounds. When asked whether The Open Door was thematically different from Fallen, Lee said that Evanescence and music in general is her venue to "purge all of the negative and hard, difficult experiences" throughout her life, and while that is front and center in this album, it comes from a less hopeless attitude and with a more reflective outlook. Rather than "wallowing" in "the hard stuff", the record is characterized by her newfound resolution and is thematically in search of answers and happiness.

"I had so much I needed to get off my chest," Lee explained. "It's very literal and specific." She said she was "sick of hiding behind metaphors" in everything she had written before. The lyrics on the album are a lot more confessional than she had written previously, and she chose to not censor herself as she felt she "really needed to get out of the whole space of negativity". "I could just have shut up and stayed stuck in a lot of negative situations and not done anything, and on the outside it would have looked like everything was fine for me", she stated. "I had to actually purge something out of myself and write a whole lot of music. This album is very special to me because I do open myself up a lot more." Part of her inspiration for the album was her experience as a lone female and "hard adjustment" with the fame the Fallen era brought, as well as her perceiving a "cartoon version of yourself, the album cover version, the interview version. How can you feel like everyone knows me, but nobody knows me"?

Richard Harrington of The Washington Post stated that the album consists of gothic rock songs with brooding lyrics, Lee's "searing fallen angel" vocals, and "epic melodies", accompanied by pianos, strings and choirs, while "there's no shortage of soaring, dynamic rockers." Aly Comingore of the Santa Barbara Independent said it is "rich in instrumentation", swelling with "organs, elaborate string arrangements, and lush choral vocals", and driven by Lee's "intense lyrics and classically trained piano skills." The Sydney Morning Herald wrote that Lee's "emotional convalescence" gave way to "symphonic metal tunes and dark-hearted lyrics" that "are gloomier than ever". Ann Powers of the Los Angeles Times described the record as a "whorl of personal confession, high theater and head-banging rock" with "youthfully earnest and sometimes obvious" lyrics. Jon Dolan of Entertainment Weekly felt the music possessed the "same crush of chunka-chunka riffs, moody electronic churn, and Valhalla-bound metal slam" of Fallen, alongside Lee's "strikingly operatic singing". Postmedia News said the album "loses the punchy power rifts" of Fallen "and instead persuades the listener with piano and airy vocals". The Boston Globe's Sarah Rodman summarized it as a "mix of Lee's ethereal soprano, piano interludes, and layers of serrated guitar crunch". Lee channels her frustrations "utilizing a few curious faith-based metaphors in the process", according to Christianity Today's Andree Farias, and "industrial backbeats" defer to "thick metal riffs, orchestrated grandeur, and ghoulish choral elements, all complemented by Lee's operatic soprano".

Jordan Reimer of The Daily Princetonian said "haunting orchestral arrangements and programming" infuse the album, which is thematically defined by "tumultuous relationships and loneliness", while Lee's attitude sounds "more aggressive and less vulnerable than before" and her vocal melodies range from "sublimely minimalist to roaringly operatic." The Irish Times characterized it as a "heavy sounding" record, "still unmistakably Goth but with strings and choirs attached." Ed Thompson of IGN described the songs as "less radio-friendly" than those on Fallen and "all the more complete for their lack of bending to fit the hit song." Billboard said the album is full of "blistering attacks on those who have betrayed" Lee, comprising a "successful set of melodramatic goth/industrial anthems with touches of prog and even classical". Kerrang! described the mood of The Open Door as "elegant heaviness". The guitars are "far heavier than before" with some riffs of "melodic darkness". The album also contains "more prominent classical influence at work" with strings and choirs accentuated, alongside Evanescence's "trademark goth-edged metal", "trademark dark pop-driven hooks", and new Bjork-inspired electronica that "creates a subtle mood". The Wall Street Journal writer Jim Fusilli felt the album showcased the band's "dual personalities" by blending alternative metal and symphonic rock.

=== Songs ===
Album opener "Sweet Sacrifice" contains "rumbling guitars", a string section, and a "layer of programming" alongside Lee's "trademark haunting vocals and dark lyrics", according to IGN. The main theme of the song is recovery from an abusive relationship that was the source of Lee's writing on Fallen, coming from a "much stronger standpoint" on this album. Lee said the song is also "almost sarcastic" to herself as she "needs to stop being that sweet sacrifice". Entertainment Weekly described it as a "bruising breakup lament that turns into an anthem of freedom".

"Call Me When You're Sober" is a rock song that starts as a piano ballad and mixes elements of several genres including symphonic rock, soul, electropop, hard rock, R&B, and nu metal. Lee said the song is about "dealing with someone with an addiction, which is really hard, especially when you love someone", later confirming it was inspired by the end of her relationship with singer Shaun Morgan of rock band Seether. She also said that it is about "more than the most obvious thing", deeming it "empowering" for herself as it represents "leaving a whole world behind that was really hurting me", and "getting to the place with yourself where you're finally willing to stand up for yourself. Put your foot down when you know you need to." Dubbed a "chick anthem" by Lee based on the reception she received from female fans, the song is "a literal snapshot of one's frustration of dealing with the addiction of someone they love", The Washington Post wrote.

"Weight of the World" is a "relentless rocker with Eastern motifs and distorted vocals". Lee's inspiration for the song was the pressures of fame, including the pressure she felt from fans "who feel I can solve their problems". She said she wants "to be there for people and tell them what I think" but she is "not a therapist" and doesn't "have all the answers", noting that she understands that sometimes "the only thing that seems to really help is that someone else who has felt that low expressing those feelings to you". In the song, Lee used a music box and toy piano that she had kept since childhood.

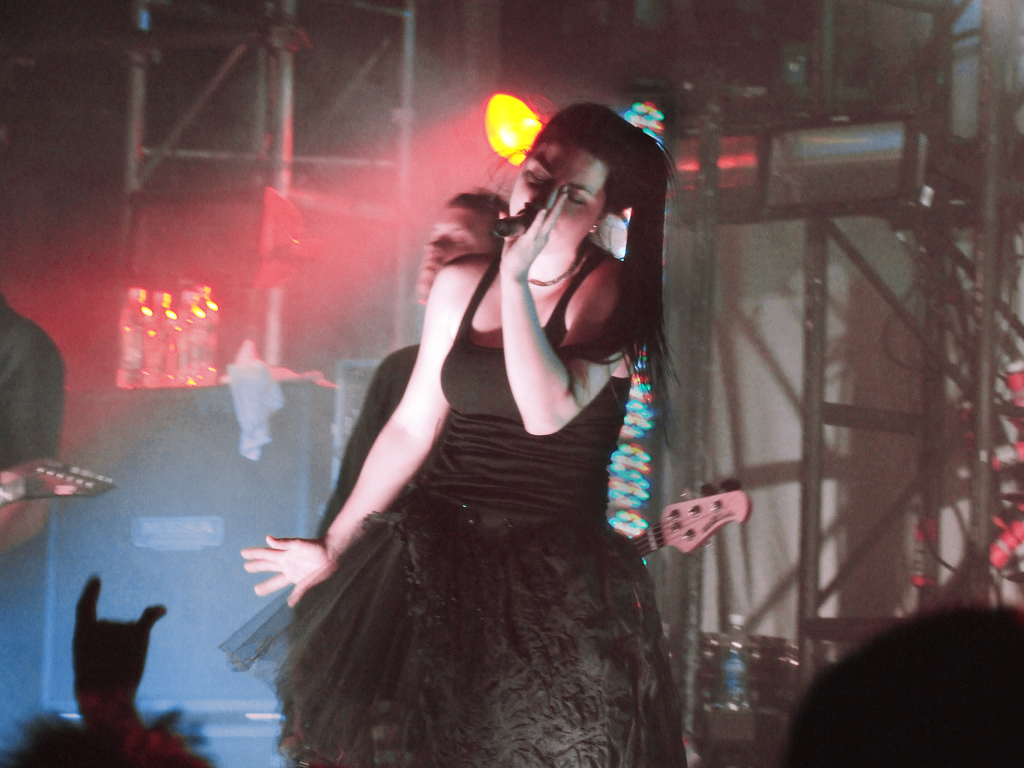
Evanescence performing at a concert of the first leg of The Open Door world tour

In "Lithium", Lee sings about "the choice between the comfort of sorrow and the possibility of happiness". It represents her habit of letting sorrow "be an excuse to make music", a "cycle" she admits she does not want to be stuck in. Lee originally wrote its chorus on guitar when she was 16 years old, but later changed it to piano when she wrote the verses. The Sydney Morning Herald described the song as "sweeping, churning", with its "refrain of 'I want to stay in love with my sorrow / Oh God but I want to let it go'" getting "to the heart of Lee's life story so far." Entertainment Weekly described it as a "tortured Queensrÿche-style pain strummer". Sam Law of Kerrang! said "Lithium" showcases Lee's "classical powerhouse, built around a tinkling piano" and her "wide-ranging vocals", with "crashes of metallic instrumentation". "The Last Song I'm Wasting on You", the B-side track on the "Lithium" single, was written by Lee during the Fallen tour. She recorded it at the time in a bathroom on an analog device. When asked if the song was about Moody, Lee said, "If I answer that, then I'm not hiding anything anymore. But I just sort of answered it, didn't I?" She later deemed it "one of those personal, hard moments, when beauty is born out of pain".

"Cloud Nine" was inspired by a break-up. Lee said she was "struggling with a relationship and felt like a waste of space." The song uses strings, studio effects, dirty bass, electronic drums, and Lee's "layered moaning". The Boston Globe said it features "woozy, horror-movie keys". The first song Lee wrote for The Open Door, "Snow White Queen" was inspired by Lee's experiences with stalkers. Lee said that her privacy had been "completely invaded" to the point she could not stay in her house. She wrote the song from the perspective of a stalker and herself. Lee sent Balsamo loops, drum beats, melodies and keyboard parts to which Balsamo wrote guitar. The Los Angeles Times described it as a "harrowing account of a stalker and his victim", Entertainment Weekly called it a "crazy" song that "gets inside the mind of a male predator", and Rolling Stone deemed it "seriously disturbed." Musically, it is a rock song with industrial beats in its composition.

Incorporating the Lacrimosa sequence of Mozart's Requiem (1791), Lee's favorite piece of music, "Lacrymosa" contains electronic backing beats, symphonic string section, heavy guitar and a haunting choir. Kerrang! said the classical parts and heavy guitars in the song "entwine perfectly to create a stunning Wagnerian wall of choir-led dark majesty". The vocals make a contrasting representation of light and dark, according to IGN. Lee gave Lacrimosa a "dramatic prog-rock makeover", The Washington Post wrote. The New York Times described it as "grandiose ... an audacious, exhilarating blast". The song features a 22-piece orchestra arranged by David Campbell and background vocals performed by The Millennium Choir.

The "spare and sombre" "Like You" is about the death of Lee's younger sister, following "Hello" on Fallen. Regarding this theme, Lee said, "I can't help but be affected by that, and if it's my place to express myself and all the things that have been most deep and the most painful and have just touched me, I feel like it does honor her". Composed solely by Lee, and one of the most intimate songs on the album, "Like You", contains lyrics which yearn for death so Lee can be with her sister. Rolling Stone described it as a "teen-death trip" and among the "creepiest" songs on the album, while The Boston Globe called it "plaintive" and spooky.

"Lose Control" uses "half-step two chords", Lee said, musically influenced by Portishead. Lee wrote the song about wanting to be less apprehensive and let loose, and a desire to let things go sometimes and not always bear the responsibility. According to Kerrang!, the track features "distorted, sleazy vocals", "thick groovy riffs" and "orchestral flourishes". "Almost sacrilegious", Entertainment Weekly wrote, it "finds childlike release in sin". "The Only One" lyrically depicts Lee's past experiences with close-mindedness and people around her who "seemed lost in a world" in which she felt she did not belong. In the song, Lee "decries human guidance" with the chorus lines, "All our lives / We've been waiting / For someone to call our leader / All your lies / I'm not believing / Heaven shine a light down on me", according to Christianity Today. Nick Catucci of New York magazine described the song as an "almost sultry, industrial-inflected entreaty to an absent God, animating the mighty struggle with faith that the religious and lapsed all share."

"Your Star" was motivated by Lee's loneliness during the band's tour in support of Fallen. She was inspired to write the song in Lisbon, where she was jet-lagged and depressed, and could not see stars when she looked at the night sky. Other musical inspiration came from the works of Pantera. "All That I'm Living For" describes Lee's night-time writing process, showcased in the opening line, "I can feel the night beginning / Separate me from the living". The song contains a "salvo of guitars" that contrast with Lee's "delicate delivery", alongside electronica elements. Background vocals on the song were performed by The Millennium Choir.

Lee placed "Good Enough" at the end of the album to symbolize its theme and a new beginning for herself. Featuring a string section, the song is entirely a piano composition, with "gentle vocals", ending the album on a hopeful note. Lee called it a "completely different" kind of song from her as it "sort of has a happy ending". It represents her mindset after completing the album: "I had gone through a lot of difficult things during the writing of the whole album, and by the end of it, I had stepped away from those bad situations ... For the first time I felt like I could write a song based on how good I felt." "Good Enough" is the last song Lee wrote for The Open Door. Entertainment Weekly described it as a "deceptively soft" song that "flirts again with the dark side" and "strikes a final note of cathartic badness." A "haunting ballad", The Washington Post wrote, "Good Enough" is a "different creature" among the other songs on the record. The Boston Globe called it a "moment of romantic peace" on the album, featuring an "incongruously downtrodden groove" alongside Lee's "most luxurious vocal to date". Although Lee's voice gives the song "a funereal cast", IGN said, it is lyrically optimistic and "the most unique song Lee has ever released".

== Release and promotion ==
The Open Door was first released in Poland on September 25, 2006, then Japan on September 27, Ireland and Germany on September 29, Australia on September 30, and North America on October 3. The digital version of the album was made available for pre-order on August 15, 2006, on iTunes. If purchased before October 3, 2006, the pre-order included an interview with Lee and a bonus track titled "The Last Song I'm Wasting on You", which later appeared as a B-side track on the "Lithium" single.

On July 17, 2006, a clip of "Lacrymosa" was used in a video teaser for The Open Door. "Call Me When You're Sober", the album's lead single, had a limited radio release on July 31, 2006, which preceded a wider release the following week. As the track leaked onto the Internet two days before its scheduled release to radio airplay, Wind-up allowed radio stations to play the song ahead of schedule. Subsequently, the recording was made available for digital download on September 4, 2006, and a physical release as a single followed on September 25. For the week ending September 9, 2006, the song peaked at number 10 on the US Billboard Hot 100, number three on the New Zealand Singles Chart, number five on the Australian Singles Chart, and at number four on the UK Singles Chart. It also charted within the top 20 of many other international charts. The song was certified Platinum by the RIAA in 2009, and Gold by the Australian Recording Industry Association (ARIA).

The second single, "Lithium", was released on December 4, 2006, in the UK. It peaked at number 26 on the Australian Singles Chart, number 32 on the UK Singles Chart and at number 16 on the New Zealand Singles Chart. The album's third single was originally planned to be "All That I'm Living For", but after considering the wishes of Evanescence and its fans, the label released "Sweet Sacrifice" instead. The song was first released in Germany on May 25, 2007. It charted in Germany, Turkey, and on Billboard's Hot Mainstream Rock Tracks. "Good Enough" was released as the fourth single exclusively in Germany on December 14, 2007.

"Weight of the World" was released as a promotional single in October 2007 exclusively in Colombia. In 2009, it was released for download on the video game Rock Band 3, along with "Call Me When You're Sober" and "Bring Me to Life". The track "Together Again" was one of the songs Lee said she had originally written for the film The Chronicles of Narnia: The Lion, the Witch and the Wardrobe, which was rejected, and the song was later recorded for The Open Door as a B-side. It was made available as a free digital download on January 22, 2010, to benefit the United Nations Foundation for their recovery efforts following the Haiti earthquake. Lee stated: "I am deeply moved by the tragic loss and devastation in Haiti. We hope to be able to make a positive contribution to the UN's emergency response by teaming with the UN Foundation through our music." On February 23, 2010, "Together Again" was released as a digital download by online retailers. It peaked at number 86 on the Canadian Hot 100.

=== Tour ===
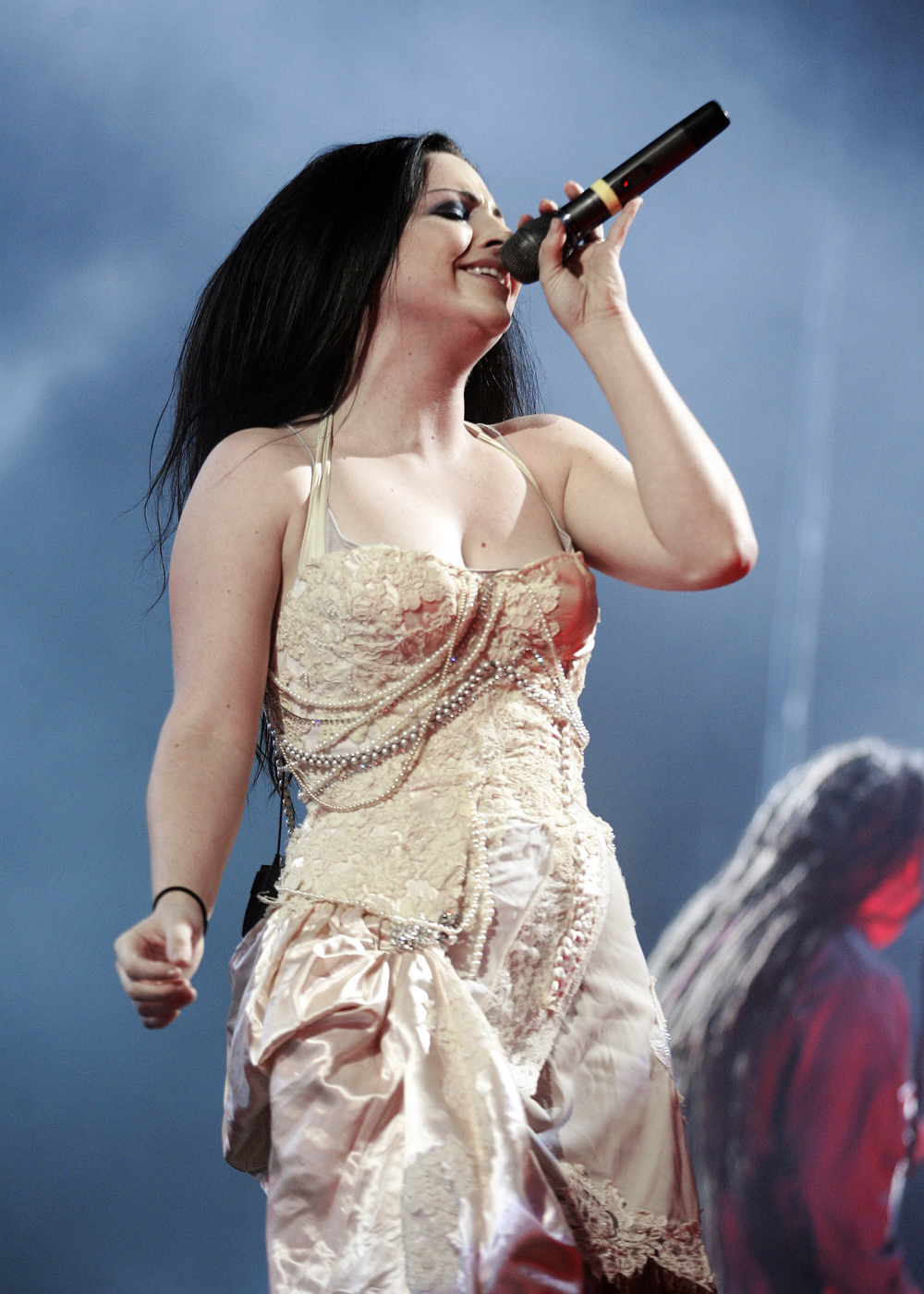
Amy Lee during a concert in 2007

Extra time was given for Balsamo to recover more from his stroke before touring began. Lee said that "there was so much pressure", but she did not want to hire another guitar player; it was important for her to have Balsamo on tour and she was confident he was going to get better. "So much of his heart went into this record, and I don't think it would be right to go without him", she added. "We hadn't played together since the stroke, and a few weeks ago [before October 2006] we had our first rehearsal and it was an amazing feeling." Lee said Balsamo was still recovering but he and guitarist John LeCompt "worked it out as to who's going to play what and what's going to be the best for [Balsamo]." In October 2006, Balsamo stated that he was only about 60 percent recovered and still had paralysis in his left arm. A month after touring began, Balsamo said that he still had paralysis in his left arm and hand. "I'm like at enough where I can get by on tour. Basically this tour is like therapy right now for me. I'm hoping it will get better." The "knowledge" of guitar playing was still there, he noted, and "my mind would tell my hand what it should do, but it wouldn't do it"; the process was about retraining his hand "to do what it's supposed to do."

The first leg of The Open Door Tour began on October 5, 2006, in Toronto, Ontario, Canada, and finished on December 15, 2006, in New York City. After touring North America during October, Evanescence traveled to Europe during November before returning to the United States to play at large arenas. The leg of the tour continued on January 5, 2007, and consisted of appearances in Canada, Japan and Australia. When performing in the United States, Canada and Australia, Evanescence was supported by Revelation Theory, Stone Sour and The Black Maria, and Shihad, respectively. The tour's second leg commenced on March 16, 2007, in Fresno, California, and continued in North America, South America, South Africa, and back to North America, and finished in Europe. The United States gigs included support from Chevelle and Finger Eleven. In Buenos Aires, Evanescence played at a rock festival with Aerosmith, Velvet Revolver and Ratones Paranóicos. Between the European gigs, the band took part in the Family Values Tour 2007 alongside Korn. After Family Values, the band continued touring through Mexico and the U.S. The final leg of the tour began on October 23, 2007, in Coral Gables, Florida; the band was supported by Sick Puppies and Julien-K, while Shiny Toy Guns made a guest appearance during the December 1, 2007, show at University Park, Pennsylvania. After over a year of touring, the last show was played in Kingston, Rhode Island on December 9, 2007. New additions to the setlist of the tour's final leg included "Lose Control", "Missing" and "Understanding".

== Critical reception ==
Professional ratings
Aggregate scores
Source	Rating
Metacritic	61/100
Review scores
Source	Rating
AllMusic	4/5 stars
Blabbermouth.net	7/10
Blender	3.5/5 stars
Entertainment Weekly	B+
IGN	7.9/10 stars
Kerrang!	4/5 stars
Now	3/5 Ns
Rolling Stone	3.5/5 stars
Spin	8/10
USA Today	3/4 stars

According to the review aggregator Metacritic, The Open Door received "generally favorable reviews" based on a weighted average score of 61 out of 100 from 12 critic scores. IGN music reviewer Ed Thompson rated the album 7.9 out 10, writing that The Open Door "is everything that you could ever want in a follow-up album—and more", and Lee and Balsamo "seem to have a better understanding of each other than Lee and Moody ever did. The tracks are less radio-friendly ... but they are all the more complete". Rob Sheffield of Rolling Stone said the best songs on it "are the creepiest. Lee has got a touch of the magnetic and destructive herself. But that's what makes the breakup songs feel mighty real." Jon Dolan of Entertainment Weekly felt that the record is "more personal and, by accessing a deeper emotional palette, maybe even more universal". Lee "isn't just drawn to melodrama; she thrives on it", Blender wrote, and the album is "denser and more scuzzed-up" than Fallen while "amp[ing] everything up to gloriously epic, over-the-top proportions".

Gary Graff of Billboard said The Open Door shows that Lee "was as much a part of Fallen as Moody", and she translates her "heartache into another successful set of melodramatic goth/industrial anthems with touches of prog and even classical". Spin's Mellisa Maerz regarded it a "post-dysfunctional kiss-off that builds from ethereal Sunday-mass uplift into full-eff-you guitar dirges, revealing an angrier, more self-assured Lee who waxes sardonic but still misses the comfort in being sad". Eric Danton of Hartford Courant said a "new, stronger Lee" is evident, "one who scarcely sounds like the uncertain performer from 2003. She is clearly in command on her band's sophomore effort". Reviewing for The New York Times, Kelefa Sanneh wrote that it is "no surprise" that after Moody's departure "Evanescence sounds gloomier and thornier than the old one", with Lee "finally free to be as bombastic as she wants to be", although the album is "less fun". Sarah Rodman of The Boston Globe found the final track "Good Enough" to be the "lone glimmer in the gloom", adding that "if [the album] featured more open-throated crooning and less teeth-gritting anger it would be a much more interesting record". St. Louis Post-Dispatch's Sara Berry opined that while the record is "overwhelmingly dark", the band "manages to escape the 'sophomore slump'", complimenting the music and deeming it "an ideal soundtrack for life's moodier moments." Nick Catucci of New York magazine remarked that the album "bristles with righteous anger" alongside "meticulously produced arrangements" that echoes Scandinavian art-metal while Lee "whispers and wails with a pain and ambivalence closer in spirit to the blues".

Santa Barbara Independent's Aly Comingore said The Open Door "successfully slammed in the face of [Lee's] disbelievers", and "moved in a direction that is simultaneously new and reminiscent of the potential at which Fallen once hinted." Andre Farias of Christianity Today found the album "an extension" of Evanescence's previous work, and complimented Lee's "operatic soprano" and "enigmatic and sinister" way of channeling her frustrations. Jim Farber of the Daily News commented that the "hybrid" of musical styles "offers a genuine alternative to everything else that's out there" and the "production has more heft than [Fallen's]", but felt the "jerry-built" sound the band used "isn't anything to be admired". Andy Gill of The Independent criticized the album, opining that the band "never strays outside the short distance from paranoid to apocalyptic, concerns addressed in as bombastic and tune-dodging a manner as possible". MusicOMH's Alex Nunn panned it, believing that the band needed ex-member Moody. Writing for Miami New Times, John Hood said that Balsamo and Lee "proved to be a dreamily creepy team — harder, earthier, and infinitely more shadowed", and "there's something almost life-affirming about Lee's dark dig into the deep." Christa Titus of Billboard called the album a "far more nuanced, moody and richly textured effort" than Fallen. AllMusic's Stephen Thomas Erlewine said that much of The Open Door is "a muddle of affections" and it sonically "captures the Evanescence mythos better and more consistently than the first album – after all, Lee now has no apologies of being the thinking man's nu-metal chick".

Ann Powers of Los Angeles Times called The Open Door an ambitious album, with Lee "firmly at the center of its whorl of personal confession, high theater and head-banging rock", while it's "exciting to hear, throughout this avid music, a major young talent kicking against the restrictions of the rock she loves." The Sydney Morning Herald felt that the songs are "gloomier than ever" while the album is ambitious, noting "Lacrymosa" as its centerpiece and deeming "Lithium"'s refrain as getting "to the heart of Lee's life story so far". Reviewing for Blabbermouth.net, Don Kaye considered the album "superior" to Fallen "in almost every respect", praising the instrumentation, production, and Lee coming "fully into her own". Edna Gundersen of USA Today rated the album three out four stars, writing, "Less spiritual than Fallen (and in fact downright decadent in spots), Lee's songs dwell in romantic purgatory" and "her operatic wail is lashed to the band's brand of ethereal goth-metal". Metal Edge regarded the album a "worthy follow-up that carves out its own distinct niche", and "all the requisite Evanescence ingredients are to be found, but this time, they serve up a tasty concoction of a different flavour". Nick Ruskell of Kerrang! wrote, "not only does The Open Door well and truly wipe the floor with Fallen, it's also a massive creative leap into territory far more epic, exciting and musically fulfilling than its somewhat restrained predecessor", concluding that it "presents a watertight case that Moody buggering off was perhaps the best thing that ever happened to this band." In a 2021 retrospective, Metal Hammer ranked The Open Door as Evanescence's best album, highlighting Lee's songwriting and vision, the album's ambience, and it standing the test of time, "stepping up as Evanescence's most enduring statement."

"Sweet Sacrifice", was nominated in the category of Best Hard Rock Performance at the 50th Grammy Awards. At the 2007 NRJ Music Awards, The Open Door received a nomination for Best International Album of the Year and "Call Me When You're Sober" was nominated for Best Video. The album also won Album of the Year at the 2007 MTV Australia Video Music Awards.

== Commercial performance ==
The Open Door debuted at number one in the United States, Australia, Germany and Switzerland, and charted in the top five in Austria, Canada, France, Greece, Ireland, Italy, Japan, the Netherlands, Norway, New Zealand, South Korea, Sweden and the United Kingdom. On the US Billboard 200, The Open Door debuted at number one, selling over 447,000 copies in its first week. Additionally, the record opened at the top position on the Rock Albums chart and at number two on the Digital Albums. Two weeks after its availability in the United States, the album sold approximately 725,000 copies, and was certified platinum by the Recording Industry Association of America (RIAA) on November 6, 2006. The Open Door became the 38th best-selling album of 2006 in the U.S.; it was the 52nd best-selling album for 2007. On June 24, 2009, the album was awarded double platinum certification by the RIAA. It sold 2.1 million copies in the U.S. by October 2011.

On the UK Albums Chart, The Open Door debuted and peaked at number two on October 14, 2006. In Canada, the album debuted at number two, selling over 43,000 copies in its first week. It was later certified double platinum by the Canadian Recording Industry Association (CRIA). In Australia and New Zealand, the album peaked at numbers one and two, respectively. It was later certified double-platinum by the Australian Recording Industry Association (ARIA) and platinum by the Recording Industry Association of New Zealand (RIANZ). By October 2011, the album had sold six million copies worldwide.

== Track listing ==
No.	Title	Writer(s)	Length
1.	"Sweet Sacrifice"	Amy Lee; Terry Balsamo	3:05
2.	"Call Me When You're Sober"	Lee; Balsamo	3:34
3.	"Weight of the World"	Lee; Balsamo	3:37
4.	"Lithium"	Lee	3:44
5.	"Cloud Nine"	Lee; Balsamo	4:22
6.	"Snow White Queen"	Lee; Balsamo	4:22
7.	"Lacrymosa"	Lee; Balsamo	3:37
8.	"Like You"	Lee	4:16
9.	"Lose Control"	Lee; Balsamo	4:50
10.	"The Only One"	Lee; Balsamo	4:40
11.	"Your Star"	Lee; Balsamo	4:43
12.	"All That I'm Living For"	Lee; John LeCompt	3:48
13.	"Good Enough"	Lee	5:32
Total length:			54:10

Japanese edition bonus track
No.	Title	Writer(s)	Length
14.	"Call Me When You're Sober" (acoustic version)	Lee; Balsamo	3:39

Japanese limited edition bonus content
No.	Title	Length
15.	"Call Me When You're Sober" (music video)
16.	"Making of the Video – Behind the scenes footage"

20th anniversary deluxe edition bonus tracks
No.	Title	Writer(s)	Length
14.	"If You Don't Mind"	Lee; Will Boyd; Balsamo	2:57
15.	"Together Again"	Lee	3:19
16.	"The Last Song I'm Wasting on You"	Lee	4:07
17.	"Good Enough" (Demo)	Lee	4:30

=== Notes ===
- Lee confirmed three planned B-sides for the album: "If You Don't Mind", "Together Again", and "The Last Song I'm Wasting on You". The latter served as a B-side to "Lithium". Those tracks later appeared in the Lost Whispers compilation and 20th anniversary deluxe edition of The Open Door.
- The two-disc Japanese limited edition was released on September 27, 2006, and includes the music video for "Call Me When You're Sober" and behind-the-scenes footage. The CD also contains a bonus track.

== Personnel ==
Credits adapted from the liner notes of The Open Door.

Evanescence

- Amy Lee – vocals, piano, choral arrangements, additional programming, organ
- Terry Balsamo – guitar
- John LeCompt – guitar; additional programming (tracks 2, 12)
- Will Boyd – bass
- Rocky Gray – drums

Additional musicians

- David Campbell – orchestral arrangements
- Seattlemusic – strings
- Simon James – concertmaster
- David Sabee – strings contractor
- Millennium Choir – choir performance: Susan Youngblood, Talaya Trigueros, Mary Gaffney, Alyssa Campbell, Bebe Gordon, Melanie Bruno, Dwight Stone, Eric Castro, Darryl Phinnessee, Tamara Berard, Kevin Dalbey, Marcella Carmona, Tania Themmen, Joanne Paratore, Lisa Wall-Urgero
- DJ Lethal – programming
- Bon Harris – additional programming (track 12)
- Carrie Lee – background vocals (track 2)
- Lori Lee – background vocals (track 2)

Technical

- Dave Fortman – production, mixing
- Jeremy Parker – engineering
- Mike Hogue – engineering assistance
- Wesley Seidman – engineering assistance
- Rory Faciane – drum teching
- Ted Jensen – mastering

Artwork

- Gail Marowitz – art direction
- Ed Sherman – package design
- Frank Ockenfels 3 – photography
- Karl Larsen – photography
- Beth Wilson – photography
- Amy Lee – album cover design

== Charts ==
=== Weekly charts ===
Weekly chart performance for The Open Door
Chart (2006)	Peak position
Australian Albums (ARIA)	1
Austrian Albums (Ö3 Austria)	2
Belgian Albums (Ultratop Flanders)	9
Belgian Albums (Ultratop Wallonia)	4
Canadian Albums (Billboard)	2
Croatian International Albums (HDU)	1
Czech Albums (ČNS IFPI)	4
Danish Albums (Hitlisten)	5
Dutch Albums (Album Top 100)	2
European Albums (Billboard)	1
Finnish Albums (Suomen virallinen lista)	5
French Albums (SNEP)	2
German Albums (Offizielle Top 100)	1
Greek Albums (IFPI)	3
Hungarian Albums (MAHASZ)	11
Irish Albums (IRMA)	3
Italian Albums (FIMI)	2
Japanese Albums (Oricon)	4
Malaysian International Albums (RIM)	17
Mexican Albums (Top 100 Mexico)	1
New Zealand Albums (RMNZ)	2
Norwegian Albums (VG-lista)	3
Polish Albums (ZPAV)	8
Portuguese Albums (AFP)	2
Scottish Albums (Official Charts)	3
Spanish Albums (Promusicae)	5
Swedish Albums (Sverigetopplistan)	2
Swiss Albums (Schweizer Hitparade)	1
Taiwanese Albums (Five Music)	1
UK Albums (Official Charts)	2
UK Rock & Metal Albums (Official Charts)	1
US Billboard 200	1
US Top Rock Albums (Billboard)	1

=== Year-end charts ===
2006 year-end chart performance for The Open Door
Chart (2006)	Position
Australian Albums (ARIA)	32
Austrian Albums (Ö3 Austria)	38
Belgian Albums (Ultratop Flanders)	82
Belgian Albums (Ultratop Wallonia)	48
Dutch Albums (Album Top 100)	79
European Albums (Billboard)	21
Finnish Albums (Suomen virallinen lista)	66
French Albums (SNEP)	49
German Albums (Offizielle Top 100)	38
Greek Albums (IFPI)	21
Greek Foreign Albums (IFPI)	3
Italian Albums (FIMI)	47
Mexican Albums (Top 100 Mexico)	39
Swiss Albums (Schweizer Hitparade)	22
UK Albums (OCC)	81
US Billboard 200	57
US Top Rock Albums (Billboard)	8
Worldwide Albums (IFPI)	14

2007 year-end chart performance for The Open Door
Chart (2007)	Position
US Billboard 200	52
US Top Rock Albums (Billboard)	10

== Certifications ==
Certifications for The Open Door
Region	Certification	Certified units/sales
Argentina (CAPIF)	Gold	20,000^{^}
Australia (ARIA)	2× Platinum	140,000^{^}
Austria (IFPI Austria)	Gold	15,000^{*}
Belgium (BRMA)	Gold	25,000^{*}
Brazil (Pro-Música Brasil)	Platinum	60,000^{*}
Canada (Music Canada)	2× Platinum	200,000^{^}
Chile (IFPI Chile)	Gold	10,000
France (SNEP)	Gold	75,000^{*}
Germany (BVMI)	Platinum	200,000^{‡}
Greece (IFPI Greece)	Platinum	15,000^{^}
Hungary (MAHASZ)	Gold	3,000^{^}
Ireland (IRMA)	Platinum	15,000^{^}
Japan (RIAJ)	Gold	100,000^{^}
Mexico (AMPROFON)	Gold	50,000^{^}
New Zealand (RMNZ)	Platinum	15,000^{^}
Portugal (AFP)	Gold	10,000^{^}
Russia (NFPF)	2× Platinum	40,000^{*}
Switzerland (IFPI Switzerland)	Platinum	30,000^{^}
United Kingdom (BPI) Wind-Up Records	Platinum	356,803
United Kingdom (BPI) Craft Recordings	Silver	60,000^{‡}
United States (RIAA)	2× Platinum	2,100,000
Summaries
Europe (IFPI)	Platinum	1,000,000^{*}
^{*} Sales figures based on certification alone.^{^} Shipments figures based on certification alone.^{‡} Sales+streaming figures based on certification alone.

== Release history ==
Release dates and formats for The Open Door
Region	Date	Format	Label
Poland	September 25, 2006	CD; digital download	Wind-up
Japan	September 27, 2006	CD; digital download	EMI Music Japan
Germany	September 29, 2006	CD; digital download	Wind-up
Ireland	September 29, 2006	CD; digital download	Wind-up
Australia	September 30, 2006	CD; digital download	Wind-up
Canada	October 3, 2006	CD; digital download	Wind-up
United States	October 3, 2006	CD; digital download	Wind-up
