= Jennifer Sciole =

American actress

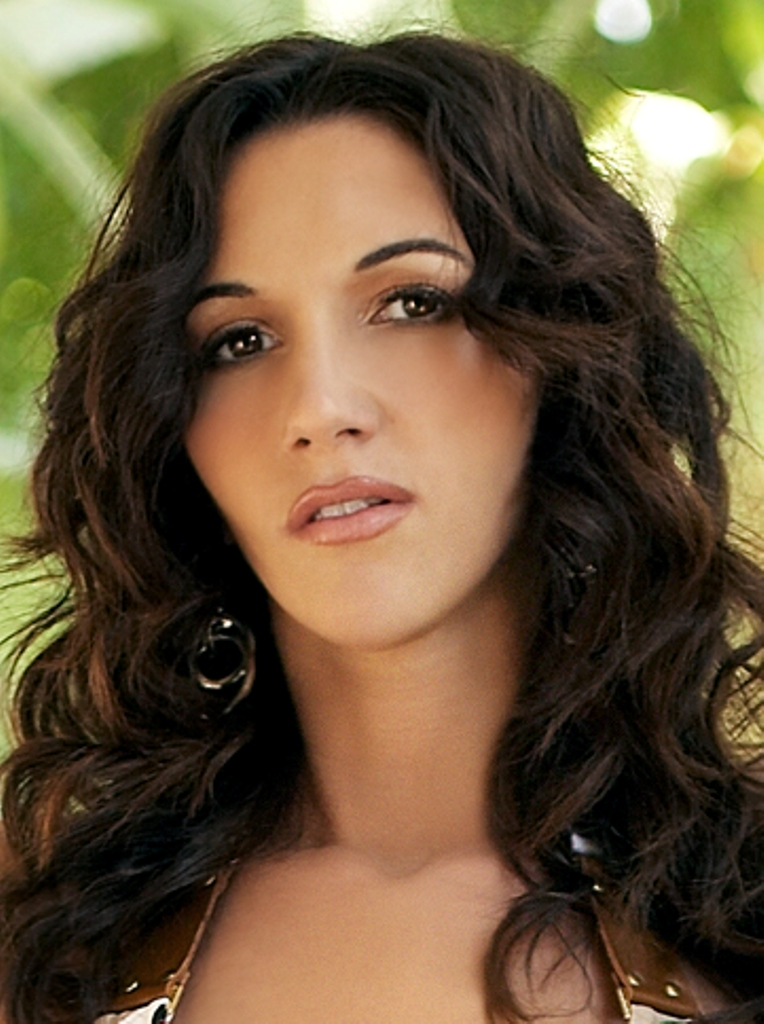
- Born: April 28, 1979 (age 47); Philadelphia, Pennsylvania, U.S.
- Occupation: Former Actress
- Years active: 1996–2012
- Website: http://www.jennifersciole.com/

Jennifer Sciole (born April 28, 1979) is an American actress.

== Life and career ==
Sciole was born in Philadelphia, Pennsylvania, the youngest of six children raised in an Italian family. Her first acting job was in a local grocery store commercial at the age of fifteen.

After high school she attended St. Joseph's University in Philadelphia, where she majored in psychology, later switching to business management.

After college Sciole started a software company, then returned to acting full-time. She moved to Los Angeles in 2005, where she worked as an extra and studied with acting coaches including Bernard Hiller, John Homa and Nathan Reid.

She also volunteered for Last Chance for Animals.

== Filmography ==
Year	Film	Role	Producer/Director	Notes	Other notes
2009	Only in New York	Lisa	Tooley Productions	Lead- Pre-Production	
2009	Not Another Not Another Movie	Amanda	American Film Market	Lead - Filming	
2009	Sub Human II	Karen	Pacific Gold Entertainment	Lead- Development	
2009	Flickering Candle	Deana	Miramba Films	Lead- Development	
2009	Poor Things	Model	Still Rolling Productions	Featured- In Production- on Hold	
2009	Wireless	Stacy Quinn	Dog Gone Mad Productions	Lead- Pre-Production	
2008	Sweetwater	Rachel Vinnick	Sunset Films	Supporting- Filming	
2008	Section B	Cindy	Filmit Productions	Lead- Pre-Production	
2008	Fear Beneath	Lily Jackson	Hand Picked Films	Lead- Pre-Production	
2008	Political Engagement	Emily Basel	2 Bros Productions	Lead- Development	
2008	Crimson	Shannon	HandPicked Films	Lead- Pre-Production	
2008	Deadline 2008	Agent Pacino	Elf Academy Films	Lead- Pre-Production	
2007	3 Days Gone	Cassandra Ford	Eagle Tide Films	Lead- Filming	
2007	Blood: A Butchers Tale	Darcy	Pacific Gold Entertainment	Lead- Post-Production	
2007	Entourage	Amber the Go Go	HBO / Movilla Productions	Featured	
2007	Doctor 90210	Jennifer- Hayley's Friend	E-Network	Guest Star	
2007	Descent	Mary	MEGA Films	Featured	
2007	One. Two. Many	Maria	John Melendez	Supporting- Premiere Dec. 2007	
2007	For Liberty	Susannah Dickinson	South of the Red Productions	Lead	
2007	Richard III	Margaret	Basilisk Films	Supporting	
2006	Ella At Five	Ella Frazier	Strike Zone Productions	Lead	
2006	Poseidon	Passenger #5	Warner Bros	Featured	
2006	Superman Returns	EMT	Warner Bros	Featured	
2006	After Midnight: Life Behind Bars	Bar Patron	Ronick Prod	Supporting	
2005	Third Watch	Brenda	WB	Featured	
2005	The Boss	Kimberly Logan	RTG Productions	Lead	Short film
2005	Rescue Me	NYPD Officer	FX	Featured	
2005	Nip/Tuck	Wedding Guest	FX	Featured	
2005	Nip/Tuck	Nurse	FX	Featured	
1999	Everybody Loves Raymond	Swing Dancer	CBS	Featured	
1996	Tin Cup	Waitress	Warner Bros	Featured	
