= Call Me When You're Sober =

2006 song by Evanescence

Single by Evanescence

from the album The Open Door
- Released: September 4, 2006
- Recorded: 2006
- Studio: Record Plant (Los Angeles)
- Genre: Alternative metal; symphonic rock; hard rock
- Length: 3:36
- Label: Wind-up
- Songwriters: Amy Lee; Terry Balsamo
- Producer: Dave Fortman

Evanescence singles chronology
"Everybody's Fool" (2004)	"Call Me When You're Sober" (2006)	"Lithium" (2006)

Music video
- "Call Me When You're Sober" on YouTube

"Call Me When You're Sober" is a song by American rock band Evanescence from their second studio album, The Open Door. It was released as the album's lead single on September 4, 2006. The track was written by Amy Lee and guitarist Terry Balsamo, and produced by Dave Fortman. A musical fusion of alternative metal, symphonic rock, and electropop, the song was inspired by the end of Lee's relationship with singer Shaun Morgan as well as Lee's other experiences at the time.

"Call Me When You're Sober" peaked at number ten on the US Billboard Hot 100 and number four on the Alternative Songs chart, and entered the top ten of several Billboard component charts. It also peaked within the top ten on multiple international charts, including the UK, Australia, Italy, Canada, and New Zealand. It was certified platinum by the Recording Industry Association of America and gold by the Australian Recording Industry Association. The song received generally positive reception from music critics. Its music video was directed by Marc Webb, and depicts a metaphorical visual, drawing inspiration from the fairy tale "Little Red Riding Hood".

== Background and composition ==
"Call Me When You're Sober" was written by Amy Lee and Terry Balsamo, with production by Dave Fortman. Lee and Balsamo started working on the song during their writing session in Florida; Lee played the music she was working on for the song in her room and Balsamo was working on a very different "heavy riff". Upon hearing his guitar, Lee proposed that they mix both pieces together which led to the conception of "Call Me When You're Sober".

When Lee began writing the song's melody she initially thought that the song wasn't for Evanescence, but she expressed what she wanted to say, felt it was "fresh" for her and Balsamo wrote a "badass" riff to it. She said that when writing the lyrics, she tried to "be completely clear". With it, she felt the need to "say exactly what I was feeling for so long", describing her process of creating music as a form of a therapy that gives her a medium to express the negative things that happened in her life and allows her to "turn something bad into something beautiful".

When the song was first released, it was speculated by the media that it referenced Lee's ex-boyfriend, Seether's singer Shaun Morgan. Initially reluctant to reveal the song's inspiration, Lee later confirmed it in an August 2006 interview after Morgan's announcement that he was being admitted to rehabilitation center to undergo treatment for "combination of substances". She stated: "I think it's impossible to hide how obvious it is. The day that our single hit the airwaves, my ex-boyfriend said he was going into rehab and canceled their tour. ... [The difficulties and breakup] happened sort of after I was out of the spotlight for a while and writing."

Writing the song helped Lee in the process of healing from a "painful ending to a relationship". She explained,

That whole thing wasn't a bad relationship, but it was a very bad break-up ... it went on forever. All the while there was a lot of bad business stuff going on ... And what I chose to do was to hide and cower, rather than to stand up for myself. And finally it became too much for me. I was writing at the time, and I had a look at myself and thought, 'This is it, this is what I do every time. I just wallow in sorrow and music and get all weird'. So I decided for once to do something for me as a person, to jump off the cliff and get myself out of this situation. So I ended the relationship, packed some stuff, left Los Angeles and rented a house in Florida. ... And 'Call Me When You're Sober' spilled straight out of me. It was very cathartic. After that I moved to New York.

Lee added that she felt "brave" writing the straight-forward lyrics as she was "sick of hiding behind metaphors" in everything she had written before, and "so much of the record was about the turmoil I was going through". She was letting herself "be run down", and in the end, "had to choose happiness and health" for herself. She noted that the song was about "more than the most obvious thing", deeming it "empowering" for herself as it represents "leaving a whole world behind that was really hurting me", and "getting to the place with yourself where you're finally willing to stand up for yourself." "Sober" was also inspired by other events in her life, including people who she was working with that were "holding me down and manipulating me and betraying me", eventually leading her to make the decision to "put my foot down and walk out the door". She described the song as being "about someone in particular, but at the same time, when I was writing it, it applied to a bunch of people in my life that I was sort of severing ties with."

In 2007, after finishing his rehabilitation, Morgan said the song had "haunted" him around and negatively affected his reputation, adding that it was not pleasant to hear a song describing him as a "bad guy" that "millions of people have heard", he doesn't think it's "right to say and do those things when people break up, and she obviously felt the need to go out there and make me sound like a complete a--hole". At the time, Seether's album Finding Beauty in Negative Spaces was to be released soon and it was speculated that it would contain an answer song to "Call Me When You're Sober", with "Breakdown" initially considered one. Morgan clarified that that song was not an "angry backlash" and it was "more universal" as he was trying to be "more vague and respectful". He added that the album did not contain answer songs aimed at Lee, as "I know what the expectations are for this album and that people will be looking for that Amy Lee reference, and I am trying desperately not to have any", further noting how any references would be instead about another relationship of his that had recently ended.

In an October 2006 interview, Lee had expressed "no intention of hurting [Morgan]" when writing the song, and said that once the song came out without any metaphors, she wanted to keep it. She said she supports Morgan in his rehabilitation and is "really happy for him." In 2011, Lee described "Call Me When You're Sober" as "mostly a chick anthem", and deemed it empowering for female listeners of their fandom based on the response she had received from them. In retrospect, Lee mentioned in 2016, "I love this song because it has this fun spirit that was new for us as a band. You can still be heavy with a smile on your face."

According to the sheet music published by Alfred Publishing on the website Musicnotes.com, "Call Me When You're Sober" was written in the key of E minor. Lee's vocal range in the song spans from the low note of G_{3} to the high note of Eb_{5}. Music journalists identified various genres in "Call Me When You're Sober", including symphonic rock, soul, electropop, piano balladry, nu metal, hard rock, and R&B. The New York Times said the song starts off as a "piano ballad, swerves into hard rock, then builds to a grandiose pop-orchestral refrain, and later on a glorious, glimmering bridge." Blabbermouth.net described it as a "fusion of crunching guitars and wistful piano breaks". Los Angeles Times suggested that the song had influence from singer Erykah Badu, one of Lee's female artist inspirations.

Lyrically, "Call Me When You're Sober" depicts the difficult situation of a female protagonist dealing with the behavior of a lover with substance addiction; she eventually decides to move away from this dysfunctional relationship. Andree Farias from Christianity Today said the song was "self-explanatory". Blender characterized it as a "sassy, almost flirtatious kiss-off to a manipulative lover." St. Louis Post-Dispatch called it a "scathing missive" in which Lee doesn't "hide her still-raw emotions". The Courier-Mail's Jason Nahrung felt that the song was the album's most radio-friendly track, featuring "heavy bass and drums, spotless and lavish production and Lee's unmistakable vocals". Kerrang! described it as "an unusually transparent, autobiographical dissection of [Lee's] abortive relationship" and a "tough-love song insistent that she won't be brought down by anyone else's addictions". Hartford Courant's Eric Danton said that Lee asserts that "she will not be pushed around anymore". The line "make up your mind" repeated in the song's chorus is replaced with "I've made up your mind" at the end, indicating that the protagonist has moved on, realizing her worth.

== Release ==
The song had a limited radio release as the album's first single on July 31, 2006, which was followed by a wider release the following week. Wind-up Records serviced the song to radio in August 2006. It was made available for digital download on September 4, 2006, and a physical release as a single followed on September 25.

== Critical reception ==
The song received generally positive reviews from contemporary music critics. Ed Thompson of IGN picked the song as one of the album's highlights. A writer from The Boston Globe deemed the song the album's "hard-charging opening salvo". AllMusic's Stephen Thomas Erlewine regarded it as one of the album's three highlights, saying that it has structure, hooks and momentum. In his review of The Open Door for the Hartford Courant, Eric R. Danton observed that Lee was more certain and in charge of the whole album, which he found to be exemplified on the "terse rocker" with an "acerbic message" that is "Call Me When You're Sober". Nicholas Fonseca of Entertainment Weekly called "Call Me When You're Sober" an "angry-goth anthem". Rob Sheffield of Rolling Stone said Lee's "big bodice-ripping voice" is over the top on the song, which suits it. A Billboard writer deemed the song an "anthemic grinder" in which "Lee's vocal is other-worldly and the song's overall impact is strong, however, there's really nothing new going on".

Metal Edge wrote of the track, "fans might be surprised by the R&B-flavoured vocal melody and piano chords that introduce [the song]. But it's not really a stretch once those crunchy guitars kick in, and the soulful chorus breaks new ground for the band without straying from its signature style." The New York Times' Kelefa Sanneh praised Lee's vocal performance calling it "terrific", adding that the song "crashes through different styles while remaining diabolically hummable". A writer for Canada.com concluded that Evanescence showed their "staying power" on the "biting single". In his review, Don Kaye of Blabbermouth.net called it a "blunt emotional assessment" and a "huge, dramatic, sweeping number, complete with massive hooks and a powerful, fearless performance from Lee". Bryan Reesman of Metal Hammer said the song highlights Lee's songwriting talents. Kerrang!'s Sam Law deemed the song a "watershed of confidence and catharsis, with the genre-mashing ... emphasising a talent finally unbound", and complimented the "rich backing vocals to an already-luxuriant mix."

"Call Me When You're Sober" was ranked at number 86 on the annual poll Pazz & Jop collected by The Village Voice in 2006. Conversely, it was included in a list of The Most Annoying Songs of 2006 compiled by ABC News. The track was nominated in the category for Favorite Rock Song at the 33rd People's Choice Awards. In 2011, Loudwire journalist Mary Ouellette, placed the song at number two on her list of 10 Best Evanescence Songs. She called it a "perfectly crafted ode to an ex-boyfriend" with an "undeniably addictive melody", and thematically relatable to "anyone who's ever been in a dicey relationship". In 2016, Brittany Porter from AXS listed it at number four on her list of the band's 10 best songs.

== Chart performance ==
On the week ending September 2, 2006, "Call Me When You're Sober" debuted at number 25 and 11 on the US Billboard Hot 100 and Hot Digital Songs charts, respectively. The following week, it moved to its peak position of number 10 on the Hot 100, becoming the greatest sell gainer for that chart issue, and Evanescence's third top ten single on the chart. It remained on the Hot 100 for a total of 22 weeks, last seen at number 35. Furthermore, the single peaked in the top ten of several other Billboard charts in the US; on the Adult Pop Songs chart it attained the position of six for the week ending of November 11, 2006, and on the Mainstream Top 40 it peaked at number seven for the week ending November 25, 2006. It additionally peaked at numbers four and five on the Hot Modern Rock Tracks and Hot Mainstream Rock Tracks charts, respectively. The single ranked at number 77 on the Hot 100 year-end chart for 2006. It was certified platinum by the Recording Industry Association of America (RIAA) on February 17, 2009, for selling more than one million copies in the US.

Internationally, "Call Me When You're Sober" charted within the top ten in many countries. The song debuted at number 32 on the UK Singles Chart on the chart issue dated September 30, 2006. The following week, it moved to number four, its peak position on the chart; with this feat, the song became the band's fourth top ten and second top five single in the UK. It spent a total of eight weeks on the UK Singles Chart and was last ranked at number 69 on the chart issue dated November 11, 2006. The song ranked at number 139 on the country's year-end chart. On September 21, 2006, it debuted in Italy at its peak position of number three, where it spent an additional week. It charted for six weeks in the country's top ten. Other European countries where the single entered the top ten of the charts include Switzerland, where it peaked at number six, Austria and Finland where it peaked at number seven, and the Netherlands where it peaked at number nine.

In Australia, the song debuted at number five on the ARIA Singles Chart on October 1, 2006, and spent the following week at that same position. It fell to number seven on October 15, 2006, and it spent additional three weeks there. The song was last seen at number 44 on February 4, 2007, having spent a total of 18 weeks in the top 40 of the chart. At the end of 2006, the single emerged as the thirty-second best-selling single on the country's year-end chart. It ranked at number five on the list of most played songs in Australia in 2007. The Australian Recording Industry Association (ARIA) awarded the single with a gold certification in 2006 for shipment of 35,000 copies in that country. In New Zealand, "Call Me When You're Sober" debuted at number nine on the New Zealand Singles Chart on September 18, 2006. It climbed to number four the following week and peaked at number three on the chart issue dated October 2, 2006. It spent a total of 18 weeks in the chart's top thirty, before exiting on January 15, 2007.

== Music video ==
A scene from the "Little Red Riding Hood"-inspired clip for the song, where Lee is shown among wolves

The music video for the song was directed by Marc Webb and filmed in Hollywood, Los Angeles in July 2006 with a $400,000 budget. The video was inspired by the fairy tale "Little Red Riding Hood", with Lee calling it a "modern re-imagining" of that story with a "more cool, superhero, rock and roll" protagonist. In an interview with MTV News, Lee talked about the concept behind the clip, noting that with the song's literal lyrics and title, "we felt like the video would have the freedom to go in a less literal direction". Actor Oliver Goodwill plays the Big Bad Wolf. Several real wolves were used when filming the video, accompanied by four trainers. While on set, Lee started having an allergic reaction to the animals but managed to continue performing and petting them. Webb approached her with the idea of doing something akin to a choreography where she would walk down the stairs, surrounded by several female dancers to which Lee agreed. According to footage from the behind-the-scenes clip from the music video, the director also proposed to Lee to straddle her lover in the video, but she, opposed to selling sex, refused, jokingly saying: "You can't blame a guy for trying."

The clip premiered on MTV in the United States on August 7, 2006. It became a hit on MTV's Total Request Live, charting 35 times and topping the countdown nine times. Corey Moss of MTV News concluded that the visual was "an abstract take on somewhat literal lyrics". Kelefa Saneh from The New York Times interpreted the clip as a metaphor, observing how despite being among wolves, Lee does not appear to be intimidated by them. News Limited writer Kathy McCabe felt that Little Red Riding Hood was the "perfect role for the gothrock goddess". Kerrang called it an "unforgettable" music video in which Lee "takes back control from The Big Bad Wolf". The clip for the song was ranked at number ten on VH1's list of Top 40 Videos of 2006. It was nominated in the category for Best International Video by a group at the 2007 MuchMusic Video Awards. The clip also received a nomination in the category for Best Video at the 2007 NRJ Music Awards.

== Live performances ==
Evanescence performed "Call Me When You're Sober" during the 2011 Rock in Rio festival on October 2, 2011. On April 11, 2012, the band performed the song at the 2012 Revolver Golden Gods Awards in Los Angeles.

== Usage in media ==
In June 2009, "Bring Me to Life", "Call Me When You're Sober" and "Weight of the World" were included in the video game Rock Band as downloadable songs. The following year, the song was also included on the iOS game Rock Band Reloaded. "Call Me When You're Sober" was also used in the Nintendo DS soundtrack for the game Band Hero (2009).

== Personnel ==
Credits are adapted from The Open Door liner notes.

- Vocals, piano – Amy Lee
- Guitar – Terry Balsamo
- Guitar – John LeCompt
- Bass – Will Boyd
- Drums – Rocky Gray
- Production, mixing – Dave Fortman
- Programming – DJ Lethal
- Additional programming – Amy Lee, John LeCompt
- Engineering – Jeremy Parker
- Mastering – Ted Jensen
- Background vocals – Carrie Lee and Lori Lee

== Track listing and formats ==
- UK Enhanced 2-CD Single

CD one:

1. "Call Me When You're Sober" (Album version) - 3:34
2. "Call Me When You're Sober" (Acoustic version) - 3:37

CD two:

1. "Call Me When You're Sober" (Album version) - 3:34
2. "Call Me When You're Sober" (Acoustic version) - 3:37
3. "Making of the Video" (Video clip) - 5:20
4. "Call Me When You're Sober" (Music video) - 3:33
- UK 7" Vinyl single
1. "Call Me When You're Sober" (Album version) - 3:34
2. "Call Me When You're Sober" (Acoustic version) - 3:37

== Charts ==
=== Weekly charts ===
Weekly chart performance for "Call Me When You're Sober"
Chart (2006–2007)	Peak position
Australia (ARIA)	5
Austria (Ö3 Austria Top 40)	7
Belgium (Ultratip Bubbling Under Flanders)	3
Belgium (Ultratip Bubbling Under Wallonia)	10
Canada (Hot Canadian Digital Songs)	5
Canada AC (Billboard)	42
Canada CHR/Top 40 (Billboard)	7
Canada Hot AC (Billboard)	5
Canada Rock (Billboard)	3
Croatia (HRT)	2
Czech Republic Airplay (ČNS IFPI)	14
Europe (European Hot 100 Singles)	4
Finland (Suomen virallinen lista)	7
France (SNEP)	20
Germany (GfK)	13
Greece (IFPI)	4
Ireland (IRMA)	13
Italy (FIMI)	3
Netherlands (Dutch Top 40)	9
Netherlands (Single Top 100)	27
New Zealand (Recorded Music NZ)	3
Norway (VG-lista)	15
Scottish Singles Sales (Official Charts)	2
Sweden (Sverigetopplistan)	23
Switzerland (Schweizer Hitparade)	6
UK Singles (Official Charts)	4
US Billboard Hot 100	10
US Adult Pop Airplay (Billboard)	6
US Alternative Airplay (Billboard)	4
US Mainstream Rock (Billboard)	5
US Pop Airplay (Billboard)	7
Venezuela Pop Rock (Record Report)	5

=== Year-end charts ===
2006 year-end chart performance for "Call Me When You're Sober"
Chart (2006)	Position
Australia (ARIA)	32
Brazil (Crowley)	57
Europe (European Hot 100 Singles)	81
Italy (FIMI)	46
Netherlands (Dutch Top 40)	68
Switzerland (Schweizer Hitparade)	83
UK Singles (OCC)	139
US Billboard Hot 100	77
US Adult Top 40 (Billboard)	35
US Alternative Songs (Billboard)	27
US Hot Digital Songs (Billboard)	55
US Hot Digital Tracks (Billboard)	43
US Mainstream Rock Songs (Billboard)	40
US Pop Songs (Billboard)	61

2007 year-end chart performance for "Call Me When You're Sober"
Chart (2007)	Position
Brazil (Crowley)	71
US Pop Songs (Billboard)	90

== Certifications ==
Certifications and sales for "Call Me When You're Sober"
Region	Certification	Certified units/sales
Australia (ARIA)	Gold	35,000^{^}
Brazil (Pro-Música Brasil)	Gold	30,000^{‡}
New Zealand (RMNZ)	Platinum	30,000^{‡}
United Kingdom (BPI)	Silver	200,000^{‡}
United States (RIAA)	Platinum	1,000,000^{*}
^{*} Sales figures based on certification alone.^{^} Shipments figures based on certification alone.^{‡} Sales+streaming figures based on certification alone.

== See also ==
- List of Billboard Hot 100 top 10 singles in 2006
- List of UK top 10 singles in 2006
