= Lithium (Evanescence song) =

2006 single by Evanescence

Single by Evanescence

from the album The Open Door
- B-side: "The Last Song I'm Wasting On You"
- Released: December 4, 2006
- Length: 3:44
- Label: Wind-up
- Songwriter: Amy Lee
- Producer: Dave Fortman

Evanescence singles chronology
"Call Me When You're Sober" (2006)	"Lithium" (2006)	"Sweet Sacrifice" (2007)

Music video
- "Lithium" on YouTube

"Lithium" is a song by American rock band Evanescence from their second studio album, The Open Door. It was released by Wind-up Records on December 4, 2006 as the album's second single. "Lithium" was written by singer and pianist Amy Lee and produced by Dave Fortman. Lee initially wrote it on guitar when she was 16 years old, and later reworked it on piano, recording it with the band's performance. The song is a power ballad with lyrics about uncertainty between feelings of sorrow and happiness.

"Lithium" received generally positive reviews from music critics. The single entered the top 40 in multiple countries, where it spent several weeks charting. The music video was directed by Paul Fedor, and features Lee and the band performing the song in a dark snowy forest, where Lee sinks in a lake of black water. An alternate version of the song appears on the band's fourth studio album, Synthesis (2017).

== Composition ==
Lee had originally composed the song on guitar when she was 16 years old, but never used it despite liking its chorus. While writing the album, she completed the song on piano, finishing the verses. Lee used the word "Lithium" as a "metaphor for numbness" for herself, adding that she's known people on the medication and seen its effects. She described the song's theme as a representation of "happiness from a negative point of view", viewing it as "I don't want to numb myself and not feel anymore". Her inspiration for the song was the feeling that she was "in love with my sorrow". Elaborating in an interview, she stated: "I get into these moods where I write music. It's not about so much about being depressed, it's just the strange low that I ride. But at the same time I want to be free and break through and be happy. I think that was kind of me, getting ready to play [and saying], 'That's it, drop the ball and just change and move on.'" The song is about wanting to "break free" from cycles of being stuck in negative situations.

"Lithium" is a power ballad with "cinematic production, gripping orchestration and Amy Lee's voice gliding through verses and soaring over choruses", wrote Billboard. It depicts the singer's love-hate relationship with sadness. Entertainment Weekly writer Jon Dolan described the song as a "tortured Queensrÿche-style pain strummer" in which Lee explores a form of addiction. Kerrang!'s Sam Law said it utilizes "tinkling piano", Lee's "wide-ranging vocals", and "crashes of metallic instrumentation" layered onto the composition, thematically "drawing comparisons between a medicated state and the numbness of uncertainty and depression." Lee employs her lower vocal register, with her vocals spanning from the low note of A♭3 to the high note of G♭5. According to the sheet music published on the website Musicnotes.com, the song is written in the key of B♭ minor.

== Release ==
Lee initially considered four different album tracks for the second single, and ultimately decided on "Lithium". "Lithium" was made available for digital download on December 4, 2006, along with its B-side "The Last Song I'm Wasting on You" and a recording of a live acoustic performance of "All That I'm Living For". Lee wrote "The Last Song I'm Wasting on You" while touring Fallen in New Zealand, recording it in a bathroom on an analog device. She deemed it "one of those personal, hard moments, when beauty is born out of pain". The song was later included in the compilation Lost Whispers, and as a bonus track in 20th anniversary deluxe edition of The Open Door.

In 2017, a reworked orchestral version of the song was recorded and included on Evanescence's fourth studio album Synthesis. It was performed during the band's Synthesis Tour in support of the album.

== Critical reception ==
Stephen Thomas Erlewine described "Lithium" as a "churning" song. Rolling Stone's Rob Sheffield viewed it as Lee's ode to Kurt Cobain. Andy Gill from The Independent said it captures the album's mood "wreathed in the genre staples of black-clad, mascara'd gloom", naming it one of the standout tracks. In an album review, Sara Berry from St. Louis Post-Dispatch deemed it a "reflective, piano-heavy ballad". Alex Nunn of musicOMH disliked the song, calling it a "bloated rocker". Writing for BBC Radio 1, Fraser McAlpine felt it "seemed have lost what we liked about their singles – a bit of oomph". A Stornoway Gazette writer dubbed the song an "extreme-power-ballad maelstrom" and a "rare instance of when pop metal actually does justice to both musical genres."

IGN's Ed Thompson wrote that Lee's piano playing on songs like "Lithium" completes the album. Mark Daniell of Jam! called it a "full-bodied" song. A writer from the Leader-Post praised Lee's "stunning notes" on "Lithium", which he considered the equivalent of "My Immortal" from debut album Fallen. Writing for Revolver, Eli Enis said "Lithium" is "a prime example of Lee skillfully using her voice as an instrument that perfectly complements everything else going on around her." Billboard regarded it as "the kind of number Evanescence was born to perform: cinematic production, gripping orchestration and Amy Lee's voice gliding through verses and soaring over choruses", concluding that Lee's "latest musical affair with darkness is captivating" and would almost make listeners "wish [their] heart was broken".

In 2011, Loudwire journalist Mary Ouellette, placed the song at number nine on her list of 10 Best Evanescence Songs, and praised Lee's "sweeping" vocals which "complement" her piano playing, adding that "Lithium" was one of the many highlights on The Open Door. In 2016, Brittany Porter from AXS listed it at number six on her list of the band's ten best songs. Kerrang!'s Sam Law ranked the song at number four on his list of the 20 greatest Evanescence songs, calling it "a showcase for [Lee] as the classical powerhouse", noting that its "icy" music video "perfectly compliments one of their most cinematically sweeping works."

== Commercial performance ==
In the week ending of February 10, 2007, "Lithium" peaked at number 24 on the Billboard Bubbling Under Hot 100 Singles, a chart which acts as a 25-song extension to the Billboard Hot 100. The song also charted on two other Billboard component charts in the U.S., peaking at number 39 on the Hot Mainstream Rock Tracks, where it spent a total of four weeks, and at number 37 on the Hot Modern Rock Tracks where it spent a total of three weeks. In Australia, the song debuted at its peak position of number 28 on the ARIA Singles Chart for the chart issue dated January 28, 2007. It spent an additional week at the same position and a total of eight weeks on the chart, last seen at 49 on March 18, 2007. It achieved a higher position of 16 on the New Zealand Singles Chart on January 29, 2007 in its second week of charting there.

"Lithium" charted in various countries across Europe, peaking within the top 50. In the UK, it debuted at number 32 on the UK Singles Chart for the week ending January 14, 2007. The following week, it moved to a position of number 52, and exited the chart after this week. On the UK Rock Singles Chart, it debuted at number three for the week ending January 7, 2007. It moved to the top of the chart the following week, where it spent an additional week on the chart issue dated January 27, 2007. In Ireland, the song debuted and peaked at number 30 on the Irish Singles Chart for the week ending January 11, 2007. In continental Europe, "Lithium" achieved its highest peak in Italy where it debuted at number two for the week of February 8, 2007. It spent a total of ten weeks on the chart and marks the band's second highest-charting single on the single charts in Italy after "Bring Me to Life" peaked at number one in 2003. The single further peaked at number 23 in Sweden, 40 in Switzerland, 41 in Austria and 44 in Germany.

== Music video ==
The music video was directed by Paul Fedor. Lee wrote the treatment for the video, which features a winter backdrop, with Lee in all-white and all-black, and includes scenes of her under the surface of a lake in a forest. Lee said it represents the happiness and sorrow "almost singing to each other, trying to figure out how both of us can work." She expressed that it's "all about touching somebody and I hope it does that". Fake snow and trees were used on the set along with various other objects to create a "frozen, gothic, cemetery feel". For the scenes filmed in water, the lake was dyed black, and a hydraulic lift was used for Lee to easily sink in the water.

The music video was available online on November 27, 2006, and posted on Evanescence's official website in December. The clip peaked at number four on Total Request Live's countdown list of the best music videos in January 2007. A behind-the-scenes clip from the filming set of the music video was posted on January 12, 2007 on the band's official YouTube channel.

== Track listing ==
- Single (Part 1)
1. "Lithium" - 3:44
2. "The Last Song I'm Wasting on You" - 4:07
- Maxi single (Part 2)
1. "Lithium" - 3:44
2. "The Last Song I'm Wasting on You" - 4:07
3. "All That I'm Living For" (Acoustic version) - 4:33
4. "Lithium" (Video/Acoustic version) - 3:50
- 7" Vinyl Picture Disc
1. "Lithium" - 3:44
2. "The Last Song I'm Wasting on You" - 4:07
- EP single
1. "Lithium" - 3:46
2. "The Last Song I'm Wasting on You" - 4:07
3. "All That I'm Living For" (Acoustic version) - 4:31

== Charts ==
Weekly chart performance for "Lithium"
Chart (2006–2007)	Peak position
Australia (ARIA)	26
Austria (Ö3 Austria Top 40)	41
Belgium (Ultratip Bubbling Under Wallonia)	13
Czech Republic Airplay (ČNS IFPI)	18
Germany (GfK)	98
Greece (IFPI)	5
Ireland (IRMA)	30
Italy (FIMI)	2
New Zealand (Recorded Music NZ)	16
Netherlands (Single Top 100)	55
Scottish Singles Sales (Official Charts)	8
Sweden (Sverigetopplistan)	23
Switzerland (Schweizer Hitparade)	40
UK Singles (Official Charts)	32
UK Rock & Metal (OCC)	1
US Bubbling Under Hot 100 Singles (Billboard)	24
US Mainstream Rock (Billboard)	39
US Modern Rock Tracks (Billboard)	37

=== Year-end charts ===
Chart (2007)	Position
Brazil (Crowley)	94

== Certifications ==
Region	Certification	Certified units/sales
Brazil (Pro-Música Brasil)	Platinum	60,000^{‡}
^{‡} Sales+streaming figures based on certification alone.

== See also ==
- List of UK Rock & Metal Singles Chart number ones of 2007
