= Viking Saga =

Viking saga or variations, may refer to:

- Sagas of the Vikings
- MS Viking Saga, now Celestyal Crystal, a cruiseship
- The Viking Sagas, a 1995 American film
- A Viking Saga, a 2008 film about Oleg of Novgorod
- Northmen: A Viking Saga, a 2014 film
- Saga: Rage of the Vikings, a 1998 videogame
- Viking Saga (newspaper), a school newspaper in Nebraska, U.S.
  - Viking Saga censorship incident

== See also ==
- Saga (disambiguation)
- Viking (disambiguation)
