= Synthesis Live =

2017–18 concert tour by Evanescence

- Tour by Evanescence
- Location: Europe; North America; Oceania
- Associated album: Synthesis
- Start date: October 14, 2017
- End date: September 8, 2018
- Legs: 4
- No. of shows: 82

Evanescence concert chronology
- Evanescence Tour (2011–2012); Synthesis Live (2017–2018); The Bitter Truth Tour (2021–2023)

Synthesis Live was a concert tour by the American rock band Evanescence, in support of their fourth studio album, the orchestral and electronica-based Synthesis (2017). This was the first tour where the band performed with an orchestra on stage. For each city on the tour, a local orchestra was assembled by conductor Susie Seiter. Synthesis Live included 60 concerts in cities across North America in 2017 and 2018, four concerts in Oceania and 18 concerts in Europe in 2018. The tour received critical acclaim.

== Background ==
"This is a total passion project for me", Amy Lee said. "There are so many layers in our music underneath the huge drums and guitars. I've always wanted to shine a light on some of the gorgeous David Campbell arrangements and programming elements in our songs, and that idea snowballed into completely re-doing them with full orchestra, not just strings, elaborate programming and experimentation." She deemed Synthesis a fun experience that became "something bigger because you're really starting from scratch on the songs", and found the musical journey to be therapeutic. Lee said she was excited about the new instrumental material on the album and performing with a full orchestra live for the first time in their career.

The Synthesis Live tour was announced by the band on August 14, 2017. They would be accompanied on stage by a different 28-piece orchestra in every city, performing re-worked orchestral and electronica-arrangements of some of their back catalogue plus two new songs from Synthesis. For each city on the tour, a local orchestra was assembled by the show's conductor, Susie Seiter. With the purchase of tickets for the concerts, concertgoers received a free download of the album along with an instant download of the reworked version of "Bring Me to Life" included on Synthesis. For the final leg of the North American tour, violinist Lindsey Stirling, who featured on the Synthesis song "Hi-Lo", co-headlined with Evanescence, with both artists alternating on who headlined each night.

== Critical reception ==
The Synthesis Live concert tour received critical acclaim, with several publications calling it an ambitious tour. Billboard wrote that Evanescence "delivered a riveting performance" and Lee "delved into every nuance of her vocals" with her "haunting voice and eerie piano" evoking "the pulse of Evanescence's sound". Gig Wise said the band "exceeded all expectations" and "the multiple layers in this performance make it become a whole different jaw-dropping experience". "Each and every musician onstage is in perfect sync" and Lee emits "such incredible depth and sound", Renowned for Sound reviewed, regarding the concert "spectacular." Variety wrote, "Lee firmly re-establishes herself as one of rock's pre-eminent vocalists" while "she and the ensemble turn the familiar material into full-throttle, wide-screen epics, its themes of loss, guilt and self-doubt enlarged to tragedy on the Greek proscenium. The Wall Street Journal commended Lee's "rich, measured yet emotional performance" and piano work, concluding, "the majesty of Ms. Lee accompanied by Mr. Campbell's arrangements was undeniable."

== Live album ==
On August 8, 2018, Eagle Rock Entertainment announced Synthesis Live on CD with DVD or Blu-ray and digital download to be released on October 12, 2018. The concert film was shot during their fall 2017 tour at Foxwoods Resort Casino Grand Theater in Connecticut and directed by P. R. Brown and mixed by Damian Taylor. The set contained the entire concert with a live orchestra and included the music video for "Hi-Lo".

== Set list ==
Orchestra opening

1. "La Strada" (by Nino Rota)
2. "La Chasse" (by Wolfgang Amadeus Mozart)
3. "Pavane" (by Gabriel Fauré)
4. "Moonlight Sonata" (by Ludwig van Beethoven)
5. "Lacrimosa" (by Wolfgang Amadeus Mozart)
6. "Sally's Song" (by Danny Elfman)

Evanescence with orchestra

1. "Overture"
2. "Never Go Back"
3. "Lacrymosa"
4. "End of the Dream"
5. "My Heart Is Broken"
6. "Lithium"
7. "Bring Me to Life"
8. "Unraveling"
9. "Imaginary"
10. "Secret Door"
11. "Across the Universe" (The Beatles cover, played on second North American leg)
12. "Hi-Lo" (with Lindsey Stirling on second North American leg)
13. "Lost in Paradise"
14. "Your Star"
15. "My Immortal"
16. "The In-Between"
17. "Imperfection"

Encore

18. "Speak to Me"
19. "Good Enough"
20. "Swimming Home" / "Weight of the World"

On the first night of the tour, at the Pearl Concert Theater, Las Vegas, October 14, "Speak to Me" was not performed. Starting November 30, "Weight of the World" was performed instead of "Swimming Home". "Palladio / No More Tears / Alive", a mashup of Ozzy Osbourne and Sia, was performed by both Evanescence and Lindsey Stirling starting July 7, 2018.

== Tour dates ==
List of 2017 concerts
Date	City	Country	Venue
October 14, 2017	Las Vegas	United States	Pearl Concert Theater
October 15, 2017	Los Angeles	United States	Greek Theatre
October 17, 2017	Phoenix	United States	Comerica Theatre
October 20, 2017	Houston	United States	Revention Music Center
October 22, 2017	Irving	United States	Toyota Music Factory
October 23, 2017	New Orleans	United States	Mahalia Jackson Theater
October 25, 2017	Nashville	United States	Ryman Auditorium
October 27, 2017	Atlanta	United States	Delta Classic Chastain Park Amphitheater
October 28, 2017	Charlotte	United States	Ovens Auditorium
October 30, 2017	Pittsburgh	United States	Heinz Hall for the Performing Arts
October 31, 2017	Oxon Hill	United States	The Theater at MGM National Harbor
November 2, 2017	Upper Darby	United States	Tower Theater
November 3, 2017	Mashantucket	United States	Foxwoods Resort Casino Grand Theater
November 5, 2017	Boston	United States	Orpheum Theatre
November 7, 2017	Bethlehem	United States	Sands Event Center
November 8, 2017	Baltimore	United States	Hippodrome Theatre
November 10, 2017	Brooklyn	United States	Kings Theatre
November 30, 2017	Chicago	United States	Chicago Theatre
December 2, 2017	Carmel	United States	The Palladium
December 3, 2017	St. Louis	United States	Peabody Opera House
December 5, 2017	Minneapolis	United States	State Theatre
December 6, 2017	Madison	United States	Orpheum Theatre
December 8, 2017	Toronto	Canada	Sony Centre for the Performing Arts
December 9, 2017	Windsor	Canada	Caesars Windsor
December 11, 2017	Kansas City	United States	Kansas City Music Hall
December 13, 2017	Denver	United States	Paramount Theatre
December 15, 2017	Reno	United States	Grand Theatre at the Grand Sierra Resort
December 16, 2017	San Francisco	United States	Masonic Auditorium
December 19, 2017	Portland	United States	Arlene Schnitzer Concert Hall

List of 2018 concerts
Date	City	Country	Venue
February 10, 2018	Brisbane	Australia	BCEC Great Hall
February 13, 2018	Sydney	Australia	Sydney Opera House
February 14, 2018	Sydney	Australia	Sydney Opera House
February 16, 2018	Melbourne	Australia	Rod Laver Arena
March 12, 2018	Moscow	Russia	Crocus City Hall
March 15, 2018	St. Petersburg	Russia	Yubileyny Sports Palace
March 17, 2018	Prague	Czech Republic	Prague Congress Centre
March 19, 2018	Milan	Italy	Arcimboldi Theatre
March 20, 2018	Zürich	Switzerland	Samsung Hall
March 22, 2018	Stuttgart	Germany	Porsche-Arena
March 23, 2018	Leipzig	Germany	Arena Leipzig
March 25, 2018	Amsterdam	Netherlands	AFAS Live
March 26, 2018	Düsseldorf	Germany	Mitsubishi Electric Halle
March 28, 2018	Paris	France	Le Grand Rex
March 30, 2018	London	England	Royal Festival Hall
March 31, 2018	London	England	Royal Festival Hall
April 2, 2018	Manchester	England	O_{2} Apollo Manchester
April 3, 2018	Nottingham	England	Motorpoint Arena Nottingham
April 5, 2018	Glasgow	Scotland	SEC Armadillo
April 6, 2018	Sheffield	England	Sheffield City Hall
April 8, 2018	Brussels	Belgium	Palais 12
April 9, 2018	London	England	Eventim Apollo
July 6, 2018	Kansas City	United States	Starlight Theatre
July 7, 2018	Maryland Heights	United States	Hollywood Casino Amphitheatre
July 9, 2018	Clarkston	United States	DTE Energy Music Theatre
July 10, 2018	Highland Park	United States	Ravinia Pavilion
July 12, 2018	Noblesville	United States	Ruoff Home Mortgage Music Center
July 14, 2018	Cincinnati	United States	Riverbend Music Center
July 17, 2018	Camden	United States	BB&T Pavilion
July 18, 2018	Mansfield	United States	Xfinity Center
July 20, 2018	Charlotte	United States	PNC Music Pavilion
July 21, 2018	Raleigh	United States	Coastal Credit Union Music Park
July 24, 2018	Bristow	United States	Jiffy Lube Live
July 25, 2018	Uncasville	United States	Mohegan Sun Arena
July 27, 2018	Toronto	Canada	Budweiser Stage
July 28, 2018	Saratoga Springs	United States	Saratoga Performing Arts Center
August 10, 2018	Holmdel	United States	PNC Bank Arts Center
August 11, 2018	Wantagh	United States	Jones Beach Theater
August 14, 2018	Simpsonville	United States	Heritage Park Amphitheater
August 17, 2018	Tampa	United States	MidFlorida Credit Union Amphitheatre
August 18, 2018	West Palm Beach	United States	Coral Sky Amphitheatre
August 20, 2018	Jacksonville	United States	Daily's Place
August 22, 2018	New Orleans	United States	Bold Sphere Music at Champions Square
August 24, 2018	Dallas	United States	Dos Equis Pavilion
August 25, 2018	The Woodlands	United States	Cynthia Woods Mitchell Pavilion
August 28, 2018	Albuquerque	United States	Isleta Amphitheater
August 29, 2018	Phoenix	United States	Ak-Chin Pavilion
August 31, 2018	Chula Vista	United States	Mattress Firm Amphitheatre
September 1, 2018	Irvine	United States	FivePoint Amphitheatre
September 4, 2018	Los Angeles	United States	Greek Theatre
September 5, 2018	Mountain View	United States	Shoreline Amphitheatre
September 7, 2018	Auburn	United States	White River Amphitheatre
September 8, 2018	Ridgefield	United States	Sunlight Supply Amphitheater

=== Changed dates ===
The concert in Brisbane was originally scheduled for February 11, at the Brisbane Entertainment Centre, but the promoter changed the date to February 10 and the venue to the Brisbane Convention & Exhibition Centre.

== Personnel ==
Evanescence

- Amy Lee – vocals, piano
- Will Hunt – drums, electronic percussion
- Troy McLawhorn – guitar
- Tim McCord – guitar
- Jen Majura – guitar, theremin, backing vocals

Additional musicians

- Will Hunt – electronics, percussion
- Dave Eggar – cello
- Susie Seiter – conductor
