= Saga (disambiguation) =

A saga is a story in Old Norse about ancient Scandinavian and Germanic history.

Saga, SAGA may also refer to:

== Places ==
- Saga, Russia, a rural locality (a selo) in the Sakha Republic, Russia
- Saga, Tibet, a town and the seat of Saga County
- Saga County, a county in Tibet
- Saga Prefecture, a prefecture of Japan
  - Saga (city), the capital of Saga Prefecture
  - Saga Domain, Japanese domain in the Edo period, which covers the area of current Saga Prefecture and part of Nagasaki Prefecture
- Saga, a district in Kyoto, Japan
- Saga, alternative name of Suquh, a village in North Khorasan Province, Iran

== People ==
- Emperor Saga (785–842), ruler of Japan from 809 to 823
- Nabeshima clan, also known as the Saga family, a clan of Japanese nobles
- Saga (singer) (born 1975), Swedish singer

== Arts and entertainment ==
=== Fictional characters ===
- Gemini Saga, one of the twelve Gold Saints in Saint Seiya, created by Masami Kurumada
- Kamen Rider Saga, the third Rider from Kamen Rider Kiva
- Saga, the protagonist of the anime A Little Snow Fairy Sugar
- Saga Norén, one of the protagonists of the Swedish/Danish TV series The Bridge
- Saga Anderson, one of two main playable characters in the 2023 video game Alan Wake 2

=== Gaming ===
- Saga: Rage of the Vikings, a 1998 video game by Cryo Interactive
- Saga (2008 video game), an MMORTS computer game developed by Silverlode Interactive
- SaGa, a video game series by Square Enix
- SAGA System, a role-playing game system
- SAGA (Scripts for Animated Graphic Adventures), a game engine used in Inherit the Earth
- SAGA (wargame), a historical miniature wargame published by Gripping Beast and Studio Tomahawk
- Urza's Saga, an expansion set of Magic: The Gathering

=== Music ===
==== Artists ====
- Saga (Alice Nine), bassist of Visual Kei band Alice Nine
- Saga (band), a Canadian rock band
- Saga (singer) (born 1975), Swedish female white nationalist singer

==== Albums ====
- Saga (album), the band's first album
- Sagas (album), a 2008 album by German folk metal band Equilibrium

==== Events ====
- Saga (event), an annual musical festival organized by Royal College, Colombo

=== Literature ===
- Saga (2006 novel), by Conor Kostick
- Saga, a 1940 novel by Erico Verissimo
- SAGA (play), a 2013 play performed by Wakka Wakka Productions
- Saga, a 1997 novel by Tonito Benacquista

=== Other arts and entertainment ===
- Saga (comics), a comic book series published monthly by Image Comics
- Ultraman Saga, the 45th anniversary Ultraman movie

== Businesses ==
- Saga Airlines, a Turkish airline
- Saga Corporation, a defunct food service management company that is now part of Sodexo
- Saga Radio Group, a defunct British radio broadcaster
- Saga Falabella, a department store chain in Peru
- Saga Musical Instruments, an American manufacturer and wholesale distributor of stringed instruments
- Saga Petroleum, a Norwegian petroleum company acquired by Norsk Hydro in 1999
- Saga plc, a British travel and insurance company focused on the needs of people over 50
- Saga Press, an American publisher
- Saga Rail, a defunct train operator in Sweden
- Saga (restaurant), a Michelin-starred restaurant in New York City
- Société Anonyme de Gérance et d'Armement, the French state shipping line founded in 1919
- Saga Television Station, a television station in Saga Prefecture, Japan

== Computing ==
- SAGA C++ Reference Implementation, an implementation of the OGF SAGA standard
- SAGA GIS, a geographic information system
- Saga interaction pattern, a design pattern for implementing a long-running transactions (on distributed computing)
- Simple API for Grid Applications (SAGA), a standard for distributed computing from the Open Grid Forum

== Organizations ==
- Sexuality and gender acceptance (SAGA)
- Smocking Arts Guild of America
- Society of American Graphic Artists
- Swordsmen and Sorcerers' Guild of America (SAGA), the name of a literary group of American fantasy authors

== Science ==
- 1163 Saga, an asteroid
- Akar Saga, the Malay name of a leguminous climber with hard, red seeds, Abrus precatorius
- Saga (bush cricket), a genus of European bush crickets
- Saga, the Malay name of a tree with hard, red seeds, Adenanthera pavonina
- SAGA, Spt-Ada-Gcn5 Acetyltransferase, a histone acetyltransferase complex
- SAGA, Strömgren survey for Asteroseismology and Galactic Archaeology
- SAGA, a stochastic variance reduction algorithm for mathematical optimisation
- SAGA, a European quantum communication satellite

== Transportation ==
- MS Saga (1972), a ferry operated by Swedish Lloyd 1972–1977
- Alpha Saga, a 2022– American electric compact sedan
- Proton Saga, a 1985–present Malaysian subcompact car

== Other uses ==
- Saga magazine, a men's adventure pulp magazine published by Macfadden Publications in the 1950s–1980s
- Saga (cheese), a blue cheese from Denmark
- Sága, a goddess in Norse mythology
- Japanese gunboat Saga, a Japanese gunboat

== See also ==
- Sagas (disambiguation)
- An American Saga (disambiguation)
