= Sagas (disambiguation) =

Sagas are prose stories and histories composed in Iceland and to a lesser extent elsewhere in Scandinavia.

Sagas may also refer to:

- Sagàs, a town and municipality in Catalonia, Spain
- Sagas (album), a 2008 album by the band Equilibrium
- Dragon Ball Z: Sagas, a 2005 video game

== See also ==
- Saga (disambiguation)
