= Armageddon (Equilibrium album) =

Studio album by Equilibrium
- Released: 12 August 2016
- Genres: Symphonic metal, Viking metal, folk metal
- Length: 50:11
- Label: Nuclear Blast Records
- Producer: René Berthiaume

Equilibrium chronology
Erdentempel (2014)	Armageddon (2016)	Renegades (2019)

Armageddon is the fifth studio album by German folk metal band Equilibrium. Guitarist, producer and songwriter René Berthiaume considers Armageddon a heavier effort with darker lyrics than previous Equilibrium albums. It also features a higher usage of lyrics in English. Berthiaume said the band concluded some songs would work better sung in English.

== Song information ==
The opening track "Sehnsucht" contains a quote from Albert Einstein about war and human warrior instinct. "Katharsis" contains lyrics which Berthiaume considers "quite socio-critical" and marks the band's first usage of a dobro. "Heimat" talks about how one may feel at home not only where he was born and raised, but simply everywhere. Berthiaume was initially unsure about working on "Born to Be Epic", but his girlfriend convinced him to do so and it ended up being a band favorite.

Berthiaume regards "Zum Horizont" as a fast and heavy song influenced by Balkan music. "Rise Again" is a song originally written just after the release of Sagas, but which was left out of subsequent albums for being "too contemporary". It features 2009 recordings of some of the instruments, including some flutes performed by an Ecuadorian street musician the band had met in Munich. "Helden" makes references to classic video games, some band members being gamers themselves.

"Koyaaniskatsi" was almost left out of the album due to the band being unsure about which vocals should be used in it. However, when Berthiaume listened to Wenn der Wald Spricht (lit. "When the Forest Speaks"), an audiobook by a friend of his, he found some audio recordings that could suit the track. It is intended to raise awareness about the usage of animals in the manufacturing of products. According to Berthiaume, "we don't want to act a straightedge band. It wouldn't be possible because we have members who like drinking and eating meat. But the most important thing is that people wake up and think about this topic". "Eternal Destination" reflects on how mankind has ruined Earth, the environment, the animals and itself in the past decades, but the track also shows a glimmer of hope. It also marks vocalist Robert Dahn's daughter Charly second vocal performance in an Equilibrium album.

== Track listing ==
All tracks are written by René Berthiaume.

No.	Title	Translation (from German, except for "Koyaaniskatsi", which is a Hopi language word)	Length
1.	"Sehnsucht"	Desire	2:58
2.	"Erwachen"	Awakening	4:33
3.	"Katharsis"	Catharsis	5:11
4.	"Heimat"	Homeland	4:23
5.	"Born to Be Epic"		4:04
6.	"Zum Horizont"	To the Horizon	4:12
7.	"Rise Again"		3:51
8.	"Prey"		4:53
9.	"Helden"	Heroes	4:35
10.	"Koyaaniskatsi"	Life Out of Balance	4:10
11.	"Eternal Destination"		7:21

== Personnel ==
Equilibrium

- Robert "Robse" Dahn – vocals
- René Berthiaume – guitar, keyboard, vocals, production
- Tuval "Hati" Refaeli – drums
- Dom R. Crey – guitar, vocals
- Makki Solvalt – bass

== Charts ==
Chart (2016)	Peak position
Austrian Albums (Ö3 Austria)	20
Belgian Albums (Ultratop Flanders)	125
Belgian Albums (Ultratop Wallonia)	77
French Albums (SNEP)	191
German Albums (Offizielle Top 100)	5
Swiss Albums (Schweizer Hitparade)	11
