= Turis Fratyr =

Studio album by Equilibrium
- Released: 14 February 2005
- Genres: Folk metal, symphonic black metal
- Length: 58:21

Equilibrium chronology
Demo 2003 (2003)	Turis Fratyr (2005)	Sagas (2008)

Turis Fratyr is the debut studio album by German folk metal band Equilibrium. It was released on 14 February 2005. A 2008 re-release included Demo 2003 as a bonus disc.

== Track listing ==
No.	Title	Length
1.	"Turis Fratyr"	0:34
2.	"Wingthors Hammer (Wingthor's Hammer)"	6:40
3.	"Unter der Eiche (Under the Oak)"	4:50
4.	"Der Sturm (The Storm)"	3:45
5.	"Widars Hallen (Widar's Halls)"	8:15
6.	"Met (Mead)"	2:23
7.	"Heimdalls Ruf (Heimdall's Call)"	1:50
8.	"Die Prophezeiung (The Prophecy)"	5:18
9.	"Nordheim (North Home)"	5:11
10.	"Im Fackelschein (In the Torchlight)"	1:58
11.	"Tote Heldensagen (Dead Hero Legends)"	9:10
12.	"Wald der Freiheit (Woods of Freedom)"	3:00
13.	"Shingo Murata - Digipack Bonus"	5:27
Total length:		58:21
