= Synthesis (Evanescence album) =

Studio album of re-recorded songs by Evanescence
- Released: November 10, 2017
- Recorded: February–August 2017
- Studio: Spaceway, Fort Worth (Note: Engineering); Dark Horse, Franklin; Ocean Way, Nashville (Note: Orchestral engineering)
- Genre: Orchestral; electronica
- Length: 62:17
- Label: BMG
- Producer: Will Hunt (Spaceway); Amy Lee

Evanescence chronology
Lost Whispers (2016)	Synthesis (2017)	The Bitter Truth (2021)

Singles from Synthesis
- 1. "Imperfection" Released: September 15, 2017; 2. "Hi-Lo" Released: June 8, 2018

Synthesis is the fourth studio album by American rock band Evanescence. It was released on November 10, 2017, through BMG Rights Management. The album includes reworked orchestral and electronica arrangements of some of the band's previous material, in addition to two new songs, "Imperfection" and "Hi-Lo", and instrumentals. The orchestra was arranged and conducted by David Campbell, with the album's production handled by Will Hunt (Spaceway) and Amy Lee. It is the first album released by Evanescence as an independent band.

Synthesis received generally positive reviews. It debuted at number eight on the US Billboard 200 and peaked at number one on the Classical Albums, Independent Albums, and Alternative Albums charts. It also charted internationally in 20 countries. Evanescence embarked on the Synthesis Live concert tour across North America, Europe, and Oceania from October 2017 to September 2018, accompanied on stage by a different orchestra in every city.

== Background ==
After the end of the world tour for their 2011 third album Evanescence, the band took a hiatus from November 2012 to April 2015, during which the members pursued their own projects, while Lee and Evanescence parted ways with long-term record label Wind-up Records, becoming independent artists. In an October 2015 interview, Lee stated that she was focusing on solo projects so there were no current plans for new Evanescence music yet, but the band would continue to tour through 2016. "It feels really good to have a lot of different things going on at once in the sense that I feel like I'm not just flexing one muscle", she said.

In February 2016, Lee said the band was working on the six-LP vinyl box set The Ultimate Collection (2017). In October, she confirmed in an interview that "there is Evanescence in the future", adding that she wants to take things step-by-step. She said in another interview that the band was not making a new album yet but working on a project that was "not exactly the most traditional thing", something that would take fans on a "different path that we wanna try". In February 2017, it was confirmed that the band was working in the studio, and Lee said the following month that the new project would be released later that year.

== Conception ==
Lee announced Synthesis in a video posted on Evanescence's Facebook page on May 10, 2017. She stated that the album's title emerged from it being "the synthesis, the combination, the contrast, the synergy between the organic and the synthetic and also the past and present". The album is about "orchestra and electronica". Lee and the band went through their music catalog and selected songs "that are made to be heard in this way". The traditional rock instruments were replaced with "full orchestration and a completely synthetic world of beats and sounds" for this album. Lee said that it is not a remix, but songs re-worked "from the ground up", with "different tempos, different parts, intros and outros, segways and new pieces, and putting this all together like one big piece of music", likening it to a soundtrack. The album employs an entire orchestra with a variety of instruments. It contains two new original songs.

Lee felt inspired and challenged with Synthesis; part of the approach was "sometimes less is more", Lee adding that "at some point, you have to take something away to hear more of the raw power of a song, to expose its fragile but courageous heart." Lee acknowledged that the project is a risk, "because you're taking music that already worked, people already liked it and it's been there for a long time, and you're gonna go in and mess with it, change it, and show it to them in a different way that they might not like". Synthesis is a "total passion project", she said. "There are so many layers in our music underneath the huge drums and guitars. I've always wanted to shine a light on some of the gorgeous David Campbell arrangements and programming elements in our songs, and that idea snowballed into completely re-doing them with full orchestra, not just strings, elaborate programming and experimentation". She deemed it a fun experience that became "something bigger because you're really starting from scratch on the songs", and found the musical journey to be therapeutic. Lee said that she was excited about the new instrumental material on the album, as well as touring with an orchestra for the first time in Evanescence's career.

== Composition and recording ==
Lee collaborated with Campbell, who arranged the strings for their previous three albums. Lee said that collaborating with Campbell on a more intricate level than before was essential to Synthesis. Will Hunt (Spaceway) and Lee produced the album, and Campbell arranged and conducted the orchestra. The orchestral sessions were recorded by Nashville Music Scoring Orchestra at Ocean Way Studios in Nashville, Tennessee.

"Imperfection", one of the original songs written for the album, is an electronic-symphonic track that features trip hop beats and a "swaggering cadence" and belting from Lee. The song is preceded in the album by a piano solo that serves as a segue; this piano piece introduces the song in its music video. Lee wrote the song from the perspective of a person who has lost someone to suicide and depression, and described it as a "plea to fight for your life". For Lee, the song was the most important on the album.

"Hi-Lo", the other original song on Synthesis, is a track originally written in 2007 by Lee with Hunt in their first collaboration ever. Lee wrote it about moving on, "but in a very non-confrontational, non-angry way. It's just, 'Hey, everything that happened, I'm over it and I'm not mad at you'." She said of its rebirth on Synthesis: "I've always had it at the top of my pile to release, but it never quite fit, it was never finished. The song is now finally home. I imagined it with strings and a full orchestra in that epic place". Hi-Lo contains "glacial industrial rhythms" and a violin solo from Lindsey Stirling.

The Synthesis version of "Bring Me to Life" replaces the drums and guitars from the original version with a strings arrangement, and excludes the rap. Its instrumentation includes crashing cymbals, "tension-building" timpani drums, and electronic elements alongside "soaring" strings. Several journalists described its new arrangement as "dramatic", "epic" and "cinematic". Lee described the song as "new" to her again as she incorporated vocals and musical elements she had "heard in [her] head" since its release.

For "The End of the Dream", Lee wanted to re-record it in a way "that exposed the completely post-traumatic healing of a survivor- taking the time to focus on the pain, and then look up and past it, gathering the strength to live on, better [and] stronger." On the re-remake of "Your Star", Hunt used a vintage Roland SVC-350 vocoder for some beat processing, which "accidentally began picking up some distorted and very otherworldly sounding Mexican radio station's frequency at the end [of the song]". Lee said it added "a subtle level of authentic creepiness to the song", and mistakes like this are some of her favorite parts.

== Release ==
On August 14, 2017, Evanescence announced that the album was in its final stages of recording. The reworked version of "Bring Me to Life" was made available for digital download and streaming on August 18, 2017. "Imperfection" was released as the lead single on September 15, 2017. That day, the album's pre-order and release date of November 10, 2017, was announced, and the band uploaded YouTube video clips titled Inside Synthesis of their process in the studio. The reworked version of "Lacrymosa" was made available to stream on October 27, 2017.

Synthesis, their fourth studio album, was released by BMG Rights Management. The deluxe edition of the album included a DVD documentary of the making of Synthesis, as well as instrumental and 5.1 surround mixes. On June 8, 2018, Evanescence released a performance-based video of "Hi-Lo", featuring violinist Lindsey Stirling.

== Critical reception ==
Professional ratings
Aggregate scores
Source	Rating
Metacritic	69/100
Review scores
Source	Rating
AllMusic	3.5/5 stars
The Arts Desk	1/5 stars
Beat Magazine	9.5/10
Belfast Telegraph	7/10
Classic Rock	3.5/5 stars
Kerrang!	3/5 stars
Metal Hammer	4/5 stars
The New Zealand Herald	2.5/5 stars
Rolling Stone	3.5/5 stars

Synthesis received generally positive reviews. According to the review aggregator Metacritic, Synthesis received "generally favorable reviews" based on a weighted average score of 69 out of 100 from 4 critic scores. Renowned for Sound's Rachael Scarsbrook regarded it as Evanescence's "most ambitious project to date", writing, "there is a beating heart and spirit within this release that still hurts and evokes the most cathartic of responses". Suzy Exposito of Rolling Stone said that the remake of "Bring Me to Life" is an "act of artistic justice" for Lee and highlighted the album's two new "ambitious" songs. Kerri-Ann Roper of Belfast Telegraph felt Lee's vocal performance is "as powerful as ever" and Synthesis "is proof that old can be the, well, new new and still be just as satisfying." Chad Bowar of Loudwire considered the album "dynamic and compelling", and praised Lee's vocals, the mix of various instruments and the production, describing it as "grandiose and bombastic in parts, quiet and subdued in others".

Christa Titus of Billboard called Synthesis a "risk" and said the "elegant orchestrations" enhance "aspects of [Evanescence's] music that are often ignored". Siena Yates of The New Zealand Herald complimented Lee's voice and the "cinematic" classical foundation of Synthesis but found the album "weird" and "largely unnecessary", believing that stripping down and reworking the hits removed the "nostalgia" and "hooks" that made Evanescence stand out in their early days. Writing for Classic Rock, Stephen Dalton said that the "guitar-free remakes have a windswept grandeur and widescreen sonic palette lacking in the original recordings", and complimented the new songs, dubbing the album a "successful experiment". Blabbermouth.net deemed it Evanescence's "most ambitious effort to date", writing that "Lee's incredible vocal range and the group's expressive, multi-layered music naturally lends itself to orchestral accompaniment", creating a "truly dynamic, cinematic sound" while the passion "undoubtedly shines through". Beat Magazine hailed it a "riveting" album that takes the listener on a "sensory journey", with vocals that convey "piercing emotion". Variety's Roy Trakin wrote that "Lee firmly re-establishes herself as one of rock's pre-eminent vocalists", while the songs become "full-throttle, wide-screen epics" and the album evolves Evanescence's sound.

Catherine Morris of Metal Hammer considered Synthesis "an ambitious and unexpected move", stating that it impels Evanescence's music "into a new, alternate dimension", giving songs an "ethereal, cinematic makeover" and drawing the listener's attention to the "core melodies". Jim Fusilli of The Wall Street Journal felt that "the shift in style isn't without its risks" and "for the most part, the new approach works well" while the electronic percussion "gives the music yet another new trait". Reviewing for Kerrang!, Paul Travers expressed that the orchestral elements aren't a radical transformation as Evanescence's rock music "works with space and texture and [is] built around Lee's vocal and piano". Lee's vocals are "more confident" and the album "changes the format if not the feel" of songs, but the "electronic embellishments" felt distracting. AllMusic's Stephen Thomas Erlewine called Synthesis a "successful fusion" that "amounts to a step forward" for Evanescence, regarding it a "natural fit" for Lee, whose "powerhouse vocals often wrestle the orchestra into submission", and the "layered, skittering electronic rhythms" help give it "a steel spine". Alan Sculley of The Morning Call deemed it an "ambitious" project. In Music Week, George Graner characterized the album as inspired and a "bold artistic statement". Writing for Gigwise, Catherine Verrechia said that introducing an orchestra feels like a "natural progression", and "surprisingly, the music still has many doses of heavy, atmospheric aspects". Evanescence "have progressed to another level musically" and Synthesis "is a prime example of showing growth".

== Commercial performance ==
Synthesis debuted at number eight on the US Billboard 200 in the week ending on November 16, 2017, with 34,000 equivalent album units sold, 30,000 of which were traditional album sales. The album peaked at number one on the Classical Albums chart, the Independent Albums chart, and the Alternative Albums charts. It also debuted at the top of the Rock Albums chart.

== Tour ==
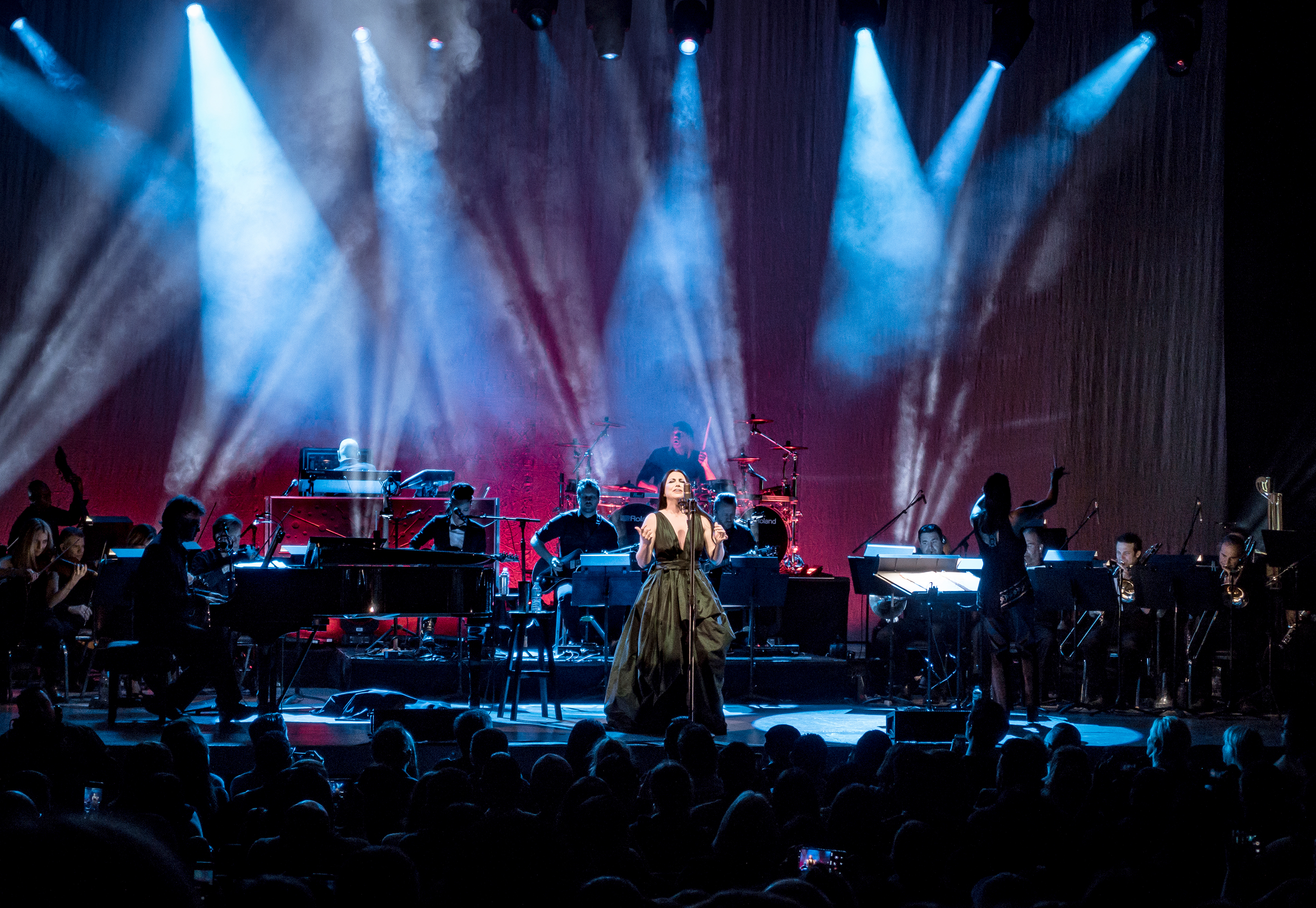
Evanescence performing at the 2017 Synthesis Live concert in Los Angeles, California

In August 2017, Evanescence announced Synthesis Live, a concert tour during which they were accompanied on stage by a different 28-piece orchestra in every city. Synthesis Live received critical acclaim, with several publications calling it an ambitious tour.

The tour kicked off in North America in October 2017, with 29 stops across the US and Canada, ending in December. It then traveled to Australia for four concerts performed in February 2018, followed by the European leg with 18 concerts in March and April 2018. The final leg of the tour was in North America with violinist Lindsey Stirling, for 31 concert dates from July to September 2018.

== Track listing ==
Standard edition
No.	Title	Writer(s)	Original album	Length
1.	"Overture"	Amy Lee		0:57
2.	"Never Go Back"	Evanescence	Evanescence	4:50
3.	"Hi-Lo" (featuring Lindsey Stirling)	Lee; Will B. Hunt		5:07
4.	"My Heart Is Broken"	Evanescence	Evanescence	4:34
5.	"Lacrymosa"	Lee; Terry Balsamo	The Open Door	3:42
6.	"The End of the Dream"	Evanescence; B. Hunt	Evanescence	4:54
7.	"Bring Me to Life"	Lee; Ben Moody; David Hodges	Fallen	4:18
8.	"Unraveling" (interlude)	Lee		1:40
9.	"Imaginary"	Lee; Moody	Fallen	4:03
10.	"Secret Door"	Evanescence; B. Hunt	Evanescence	3:48
11.	"Lithium"	Lee	The Open Door	4:05
12.	"Lost in Paradise"	Evanescence	Evanescence	4:43
13.	"Your Star"	Lee; Balsamo	The Open Door	4:38
14.	"My Immortal"	Lee; Moody	Fallen	4:25
15.	"The In-Between" (piano solo)	Lee		2:11
16.	"Imperfection"	Lee; B. Hunt		4:22
Total length:				62:17

International deluxe edition bonus DVD
No.	Title	Length
1.	"From the Inside: The Creation of Synthesis"
2.	"Synthesis" (instrumental album)
3.	"Synthesis" (5.1 surround mix)
4.	"Photo gallery"

== Personnel ==
Credits adapted from the liner notes of Synthesis.

=== Evanescence ===
- Amy Lee – vocals, piano
- Troy McLawhorn – guitar
- Jen Majura – guitar, theremin
- Tim McCord – guitar, synths
- Will Hunt – drums

=== Additional musicians ===
- Will Hunt (Spaceway) – programming, synths
- Lindsey Stirling – violin on "Hi-Lo"
- David Campbell – orchestra arrangement, orchestra conducting

=== Technical ===
- Will Hunt (Spaceway) – production, engineering
- Amy Lee – production
- Damian Taylor – mixing
- Reese Murphy – additional engineering
- Robbie May – engineering assistance
- Nick Spezia – orchestral engineering
- Jasper LeMaster – orchestral engineering assistance
- Gary Hedden – additional audio editing
- Emily Lazar – mastering
- Chris Allgood – mastering assistance
- Ethan Mates – additional engineering on "Hi-Lo"

=== Artwork ===
- P. R. Brown – album art, design, photography
- Jeff Molyneaux – studio photography, videography
- Tyler Barksdale – studio photography, videography

== Charts ==
=== Weekly charts ===
Chart (2017)	Peak position
Australian Albums (ARIA)	6
Austrian Albums (Ö3 Austria)	11
Belgian Albums (Ultratop Flanders)	21
Belgian Albums (Ultratop Wallonia)	31
Canadian Albums (Billboard)	16
Czech Albums (ČNS IFPI)	49
Dutch Albums (Album Top 100)	23
French Albums (SNEP)	58
German Albums (Offizielle Top 100)	5
Greek Albums (IFPI)	11
Irish Albums (IRMA)	60
Italian Albums (FIMI)	25
Japan Hot Albums (Billboard Japan)	55
Japanese Albums (Oricon)	36
New Zealand Albums (RMNZ)	20
Polish Albums (ZPAV)	41
Portuguese Albums (AFP)	25
Scottish Albums (Official Charts)	19
Spanish Albums (Promusicae)	20
Swedish Hard Rock Albums (Sverigetopplistan)	19
Swiss Albums (Schweizer Hitparade)	9
UK Albums (Official Charts)	23
US Billboard 200	8
US Independent Albums (Billboard)	1
US Top Alternative Albums (Billboard)	1
US Top Classical Albums (Billboard)	1
US Top Classical Crossover Albums (Billboard)	1
US Top Rock Albums (Billboard)	1
US Indie Store Album Sales (Billboard)	8

=== Year-end charts ===
Chart (2018)	Position
US Independent Albums (Billboard)	18
US Top Alternative Albums (Billboard)	48
US Top Classical Albums (Billboard)	4
US Top Rock Albums (Billboard)	100

Chart (2019)	Position
US Top Classical Albums (Billboard)	23

== Certifications ==
Certifications and sales for "Synthesis"
Region	Certification	Certified units/sales
United Kingdom (BPI)	Silver	60,000^{‡}
^{^} Shipments figures based on certification alone.^{‡} Sales+streaming figures based on certification alone.
