= An American Saga =

An American Saga may refer to:

- Horizon: An American Saga, a series of four planned American epic Western films
- Jackson Pollock: An American Saga, a 1989 biography of painter Jackson Pollock, by Steven Naifeh and Gregory White Smith
- The Peaceable Kingdom: An American Saga, a historical novel in two parts by the Dutch Quaker author Jan de Hartog
- Wu-Tang: An American Saga, an American biographical drama television series

== See also ==
- American (disambiguation)
- Saga (disambiguation)
