= Equinox (Equilibrium album) =

Studio album by Equilibrium
- Released: 28 November 2025
- Recorded: 2023–2025
- Genre: Pagan metal; electronic metal; folk metal; metalcore
- Length: 44:51
- Label: Nuclear Blast
- Producer: René Berthiaume; Jessica Rösch; Daniel McCook

Equilibrium chronology
Renegades (2019)	Equinox (2025)

Singles from Equinox
- 1. "Gnosis" Released: 15 August 2024; 2. "Bloodwood" Released: 2 September 2025; 3. "I'll Be Thunder" Released: 1 October 2025; 4. "Borrowed Waters" Released: 28 October 2025; 5. "Nexus" Released: 28 November 2025

Professional ratings
Review scores
Source	Rating
Blabbermouth.net	8.5/10
Rock Hard	5.5/10
Sputnikmusic	3.2/5
Stormbringer	4.5/5

Equinox is the seventh studio album by German folk metal band Equilibrium, released on November 28, 2025. Originally planned to be released in 2024 as an EP consisting of 8 tracks, founding guitarist René Berthiaume decided to add more songs to it and make it a full-length album. It is the first studio album featuring Fabian Getto as vocalist, and their last with guitarist Dom R. Crey. Singles/music videos were released for "Bloodwood", "I'll Be Thunder", "Borrowed Waters", and "Nexus".

== Track listing ==
All lyrics are written by Jessica Rösch; all music is composed by René Berthiaume.

No.	Title	Length
1.	"Earth Tongue"	3:13
2.	"Awakening"	3:48
3.	"Legends"	4:49
4.	"Archivist"	1:58
5.	"Gnosis"	4:35
6.	"Bloodwood"	4:37
7.	"I'll Be Thunder"	3:20
8.	"Anderswelt"	4:08
9.	"One Hundred Hands"	4:05
10.	"Borrowed Waters" (featuring Roniit)	4:16
11.	"Rituals of Sun and Moon"	0:36
12.	"Nexus"	4:07
13.	"Tides of Time"	1:19
Total length:		44:51

== Personnel ==
Credits adapted from the album's liner notes and Tidal.

=== Equilibrium ===
- Dominik Crey – guitar
- Fabian Getto – main vocals
- René Berthiaume – guitar, recording, production (all tracks); additional vocals (tracks 3, 4, 6, 12), layout
- Tuval Refaeli – drums

=== Additional contributors ===
- Daniel McCook – recording, production, mixing, mastering
- Jessica Rösch – recording, production (all tracks); voice (1, 12), additional vocals (3, 4, 6, 12), cover art
- Roniit – vocals (10)
- Heidevolk – choir (1)
- Shahaf Ostfeld Franco – voice (11)
- Shir-Ran Yinon – violins, nyckelharpa (1, 4, 8, 10)
- Marc Wendorf – additional vocals (3, 4, 6, 12)
- Marzi – additional vocal recording (3, 4, 6, 12)
- Dom R. Crey – vinyl mastering
