= Renegades (Equilibrium album) =

2019 album by Equilibrium

Studio album by Equilibrium
- Released: August 23, 2019
- Recorded: September 2018 - March 2019
- Genre: Metalcore, symphonic metal, melodic death metal
- Length: 46:40
- Label: Nuclear Blast Records
- Producer: Equilibrium, Robin Leijon

Equilibrium chronology
Armageddon (2016)	Renegades (2019)	Equinox (2025)

Singles from Renegades
- 1. "Renegades - A Lost Generation" Released: 28 June 2019; 2. "Path of Destiny" Released: 2 August 2019; 3. "Final Tear" Released: 24 August 2019

Professional ratings
Review scores
Source	Rating
METAL GODS TV	9/10
Sputnikmusic	2.7/5

Renegades is the sixth studio album by German metal band Equilibrium. It is also the first album featuring the band's new clean male vocalist and bassist Martin Berger (Skar Productions) and the new keyboardist Skadi Rosehurst.

== Music and lyrics ==
The album, while maintaining some of their signature epic, folk metal roots, sees the band adopting a more clean-sung, electronic, and modern metalcore direction. Guitarist, leader and main songwriter René Berthiaume commented:

Musically it is a typical Equilibrium album, but we have a lot of new elements included. We have more modern stuff but still keep the folkish melodies and of course the gross screams and heavy guitars, but we introduce more modern elements like electronic sounds and also the clean vocals.

The lyrics on the album deal with personal themes, in contrast with the German mythology topics that would be addressed before. Also, the album is almost entirely sung in English. According to Berthiaume:

We just felt that we have done enough about fantasy things and tales in the past and with so much going on in the world nowadays we thought it would be nice to put it to music. [...] we only have one song with German lyrics and that is because that particular song is a little more old school so the German lyrics fit better. All of the other songs sound more modern so we felt English was more suitable. Of course, the other side is more people can understand and speak English over German and we really like people to understand what we are singing about.

The digipak edition of the album comes with a bonus disc containing 8-bit versions of all the songs.

== Track listing ==
No.	Title	Length
1.	"Renegades - A Lost Generation"	4:32
2.	"Tornado"	4:29
3.	"Himmel und Feuer" (Sky and Fire)	4:19
4.	"Path of Destiny" (featuring The Butcher Sisters)	3:40
5.	"Moonlight"	4:59
6.	"Kawaakari - The Periphery of the Mind"	4:46
7.	"Johnny B" (The Hooters cover)	4:04
8.	"Final Tear"	4:27
9.	"Hype Train"	4:18
10.	"Rise of the Phoenix"	7:06
Total length:		46:40

== Personnel ==
- Robert "Robse" Dahn – vocals
- Martin "Skar" Berger – bass, clean vocals
- René "Berthammer" Berthiaume – guitar
- Dom R. Crey – guitar
- Skadi Rosehurst – keyboards
- Tuval "Hati" Refaeli – drums

Technical staff

- Robin Leijon - production, mixing
- Mike Kalajian - mastering
