= Equilibrium (band) =

German folk metal band

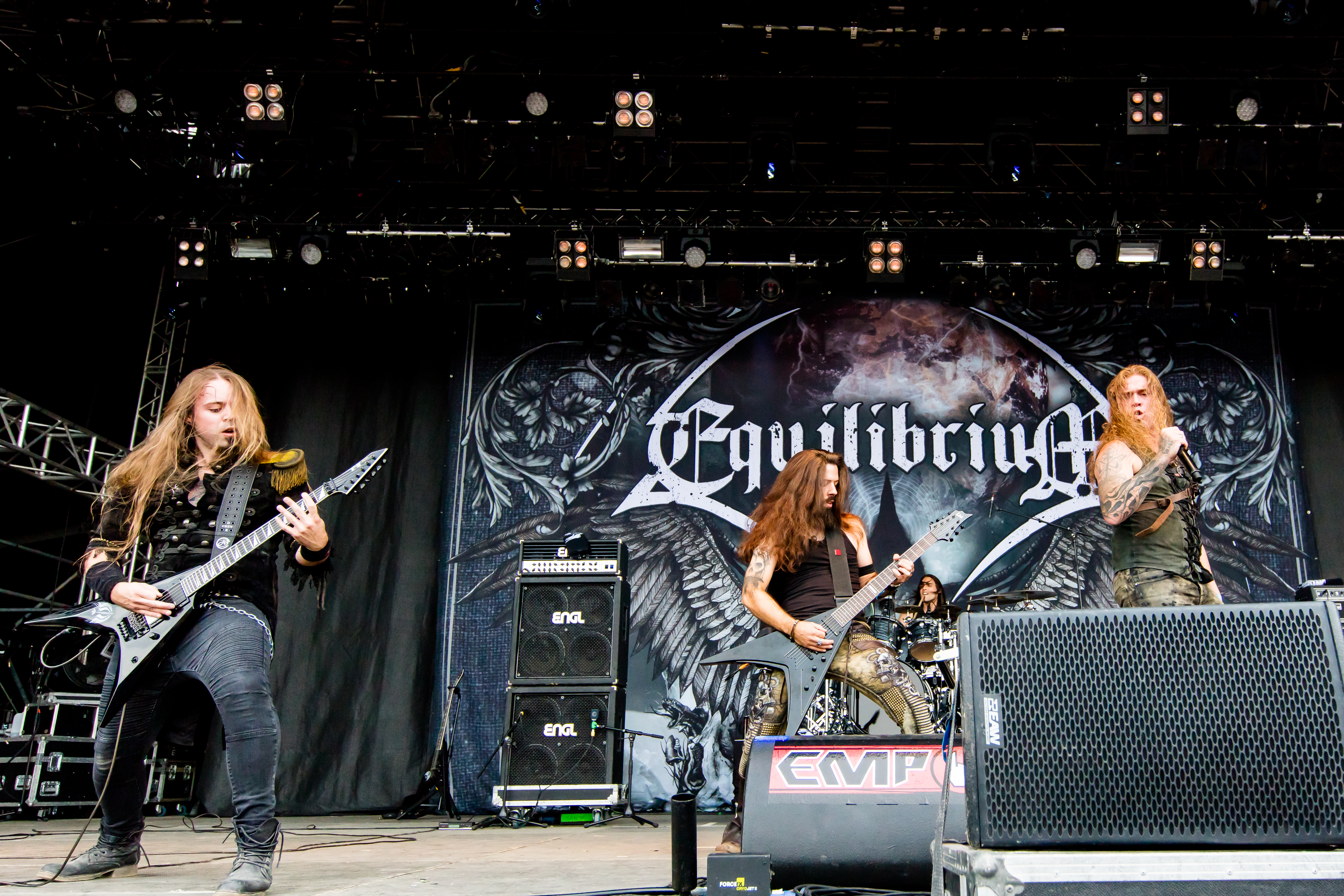
- Equilibrium in 2016

Background information
- Origin: Bavaria, Germany
- Genres: Symphonic black metal, folk metal, Viking metal, metalcore
- Years active: 2001–present
- Labels: Black Attakk, Nuclear Blast
- Members: Fabian Getto; René Berthiaume; Skadi Rosehurst; Tuval "Hati" Refaeli
- Past members: Dom R. Crey; Martin "Skar" Berger; Robert "Robse" Dahn; Makki Solvalt; Jen Majura; Andreas Völkl; Sandra Völkl; Helge Stang; Manuel DiCamillo; Henning Stein; Michael Heidenreich; Conny Kaiser; Julius Koblitzek; Basti Kriegl; Markus Perschke; Armin Dörfler
- Website: equilibrium-metal.net/en/

Equilibrium is a German folk metal band from Bavaria. The band's music combines elements of folk music, Viking metal, and symphonic black metal, though they recently took on a more modern metalcore direction. Their riffs reflect traditional Germanic melodies. Their lyrical themes focus on Germanic tales and mythology. The lyrics of the band used to be mostly in German, although most recently they prioritized English, especially starting with their sixth album Renegades (2019).

== History ==
The group toured with Commander and Sycronomica in 2005. The following year they signed a contract with the Nuclear Blast record label and on 27 June 2008 they released their second album, Sagas.

In February 2010, Equilibrium had to cancel their appearance at the Winterfire Festival in Germany "due to serious restructuring within the band". It was later revealed that vocalist Helge Stang and drummer Manuel DiCamillo had left the band. The following month the band announced that Robse, vocalist in the German pagan metal band Vrankenvorde, had been chosen as their new vocalist.

In the same year, Israeli drummer Tuval "Hati" Refaeli, who is also the drummer of the brutal death metal band Viscera Trail joined the band. The band, full again, released their third album, Rekreatur, via Nuclear Blast, on 18 June 2010.

On 27 June 2013, the band announced their first EP, titled Waldschrein, which contains a new single along with its acoustic version, a remake of the song "Der Sturm" and an old, previously unreleased song titled "Zwergenhammer", as well as their own cover of the main theme for the game The Elder Scrolls V: Skyrim, composed by Jeremy Soule, titled "Himmelsrand". The EP was released on 16 August 2013.

The song "Waldschrein" is part of the next album of the band, Erdentempel, which was released in June 2014. However, the album contains a completely re-recorded version of the song. Two days after the announcement of the album, founding members and siblings Andreas Völkl and Sandra Van Eldik decided to leave the band for unspecified reasons.

On 20 May 2014, it was announced that Dom R. Crey (guitarist of Wolfchant and frontman of Nothgard) would be joining the band as new guitarist, replacing Andreas Völkl. On 7 June 2014, one day after Erdentempel's release, it was announced that Jen Majura would be joining the band as new bassist, replacing Sandra Van Eldik. The band promoted the release of their new album with a European tour, supported by Trollfest and Dom's other band Nothgard.

On 2 November 2015, the band announced via Facebook that bass player Jen Majura had left the band.

On 22 August 2016, the band's fifth album Armageddon was released via Nuclear Blast.

On 22 May 2019, the band announced their sixth album Renegades, which was released on 23 August 2019 via Nuclear Blast. This album is the first one featuring new keyboardist Skadi Rosehurst, and the only one with bassist and clean vocalist Skar (Skar Productions on YouTube).

On 13 August 2021, Equilibrium released a new single, titled "Revolution", and announced that they are expected to release their seventh studio album in 2022.

On 27 October 2021, the band released their single "XX", to celebrate their 20th anniversary. On 3 October 2022, citing a loss of "symbiosis", Equilibrium announced the departure of Robse as vocalist, wishing him well for the future.

On 18 October 2022, the band opened a public audition to search for a new vocalist. On 7 July 2023, the band released the single "Shelter" introducing their new vocalist Fabian Getto, selected from the audition they opened months before, describing him as "the missing piece they had been searching for".

On 11 August 2024, bassist Martin "Skar" Berger announced his departure from the band. On 25 July 2025, guitarist Dom R. Crey also announced he was leaving the group.

On 1 October 2025, the band announced their seventh album Equinox, released on 28 November, 2025, preceded by the two singles "Bloodwood" and "I'll Be Thunder", and being the first studio album featuring Fabian Getto as vocalist.

== Band members ==
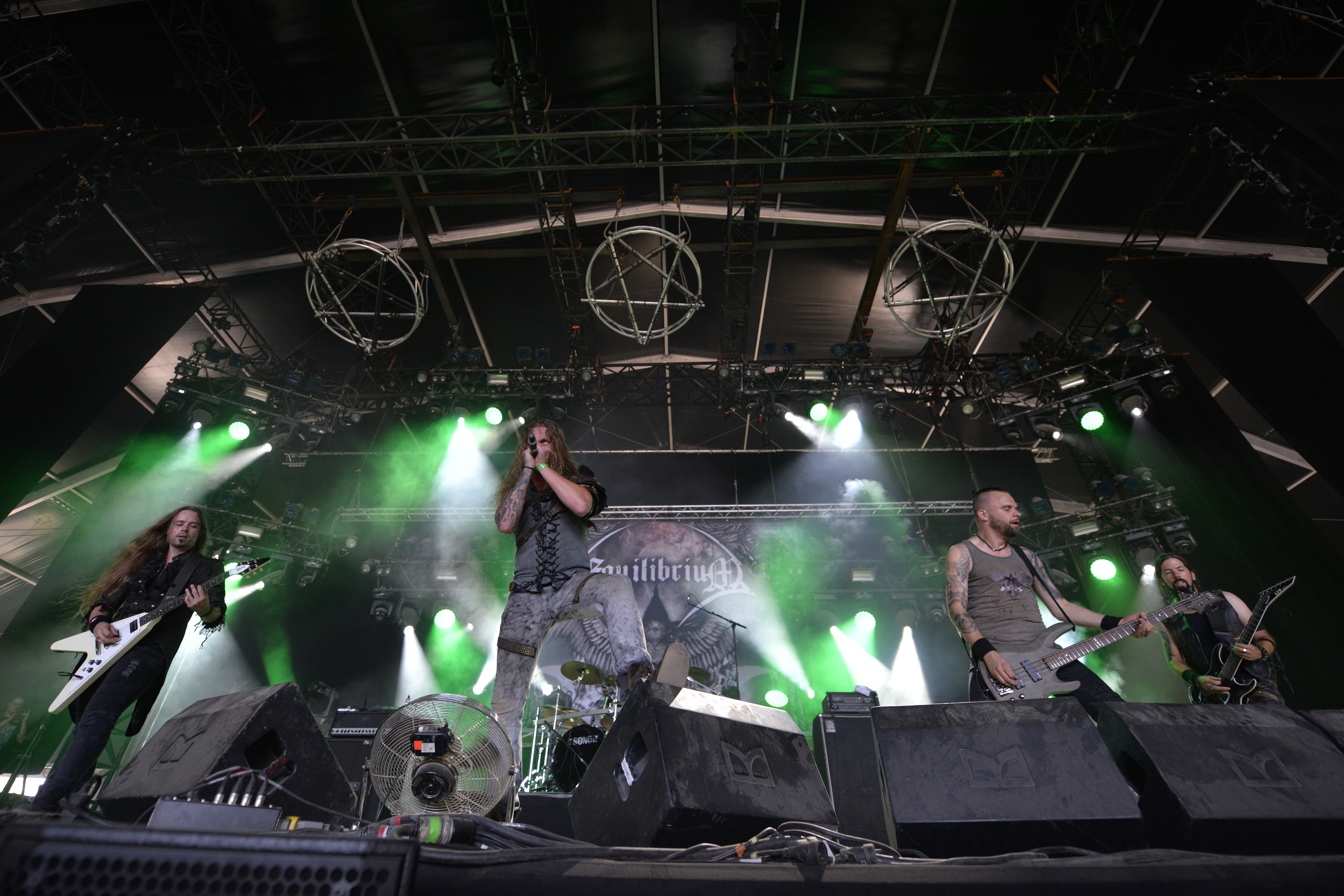
Equilibrium at Hellfest in 2017

Current members

- Fabian Getto – vocals (2023–present)
- René Berthiaume − guitars (2001–present), keyboards (2003–2005, 2006–present), clean vocals (2014–2019), bass (2015–2016, 2024–present)
- Skadi Rosehurst − keyboards (2019–present)
- Tuval "Hati" Refaeli – drums (2010–present)
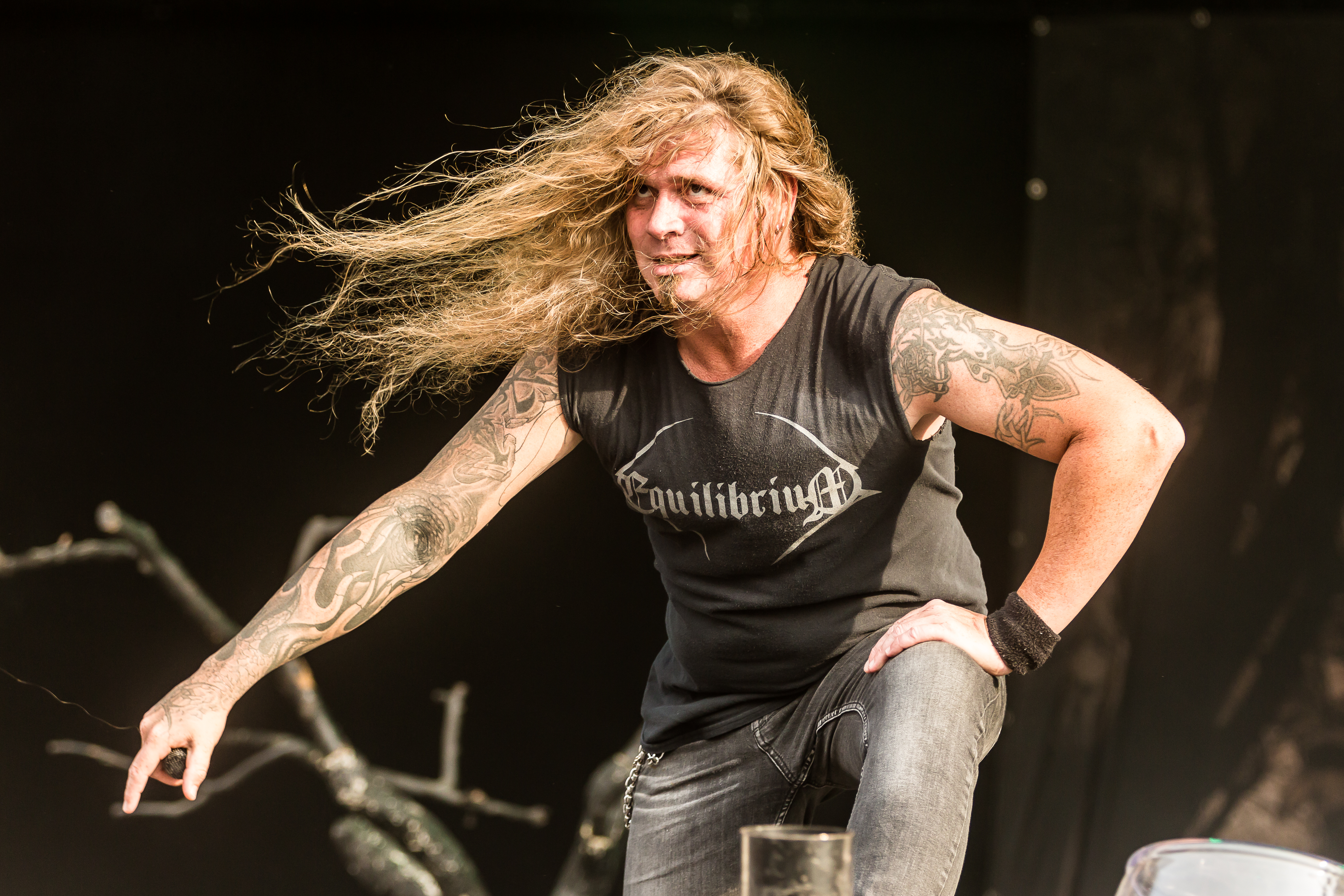
Robert "Robse" Dahn

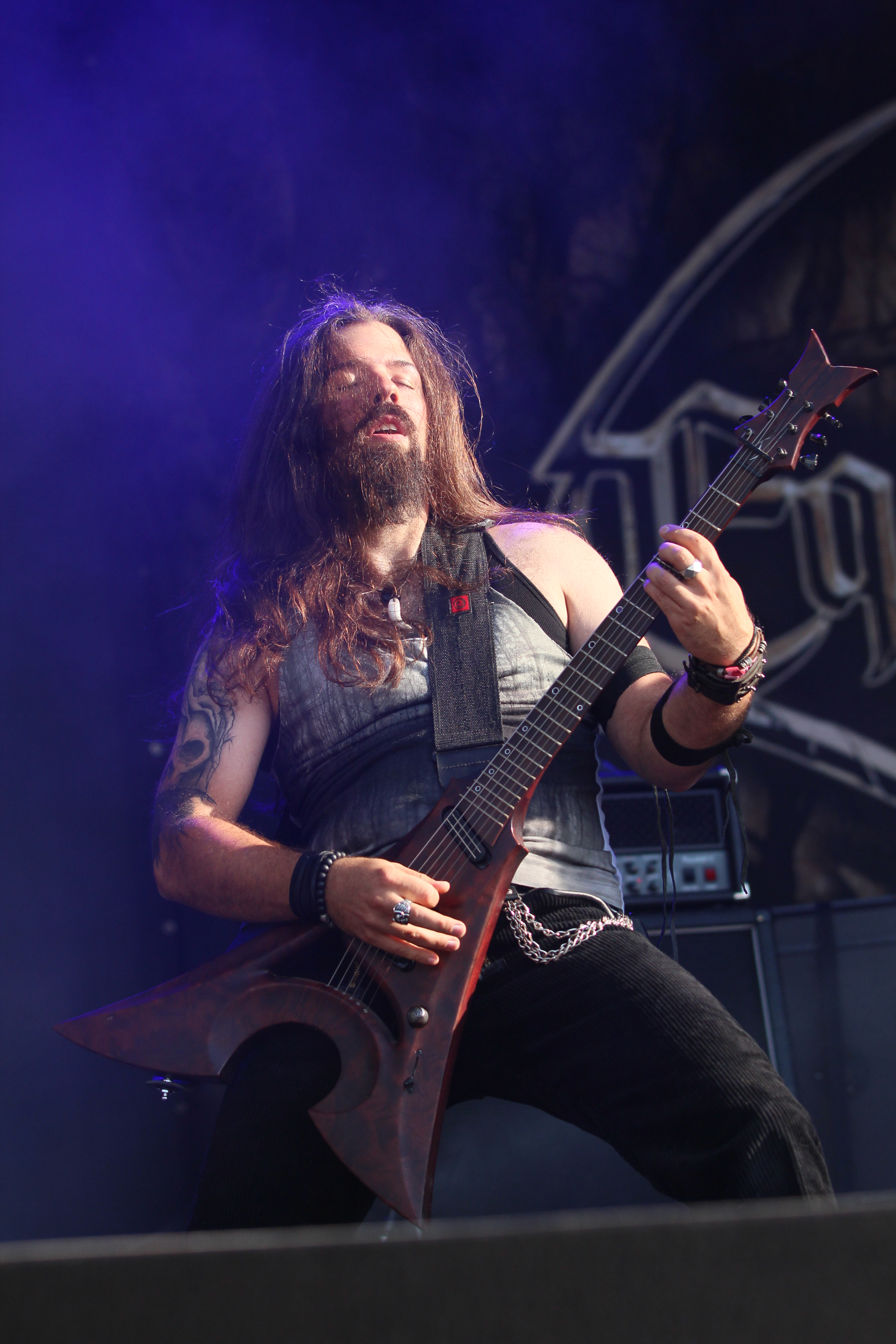
René Berthiaume

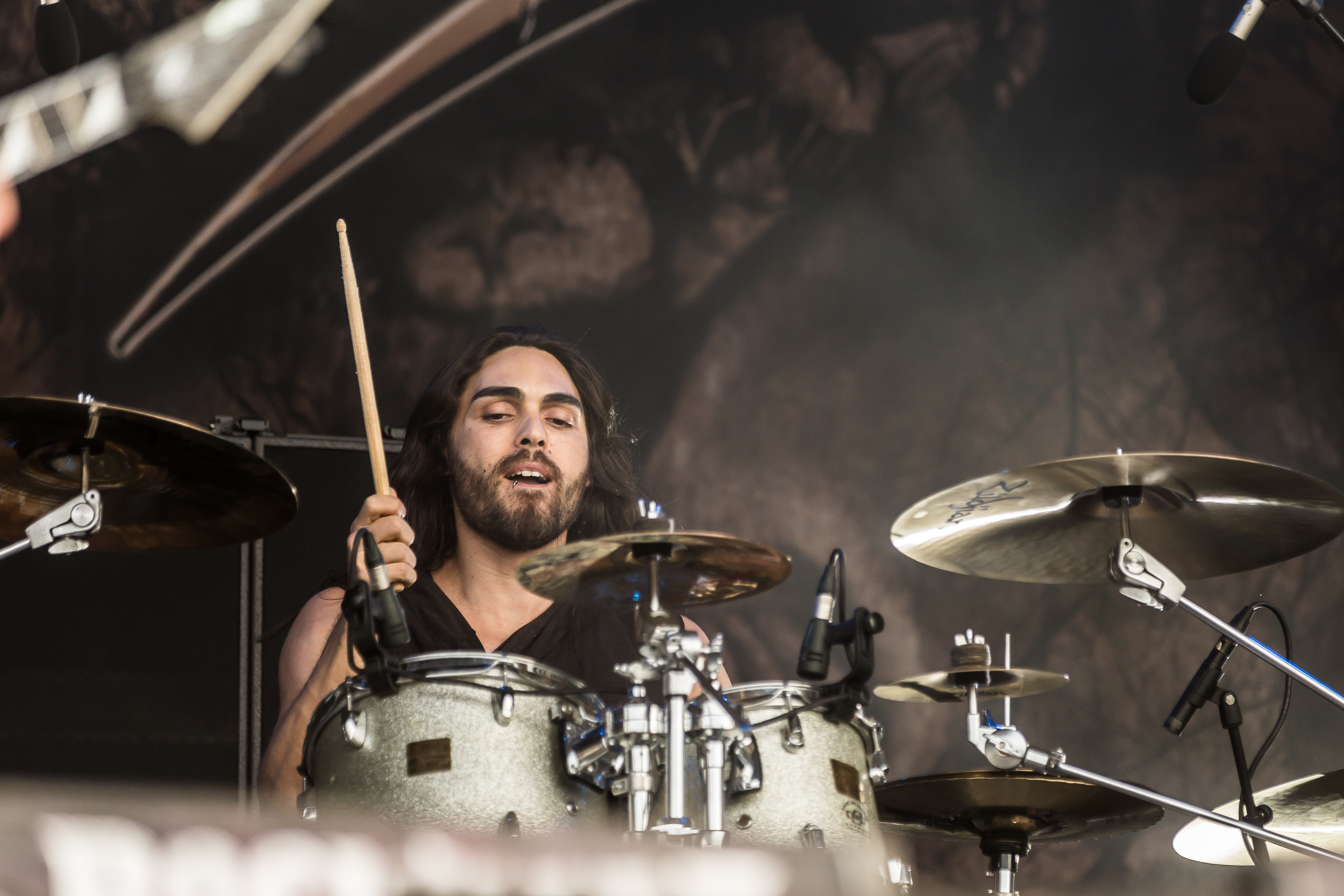
Tuval "Hati" Refaeli

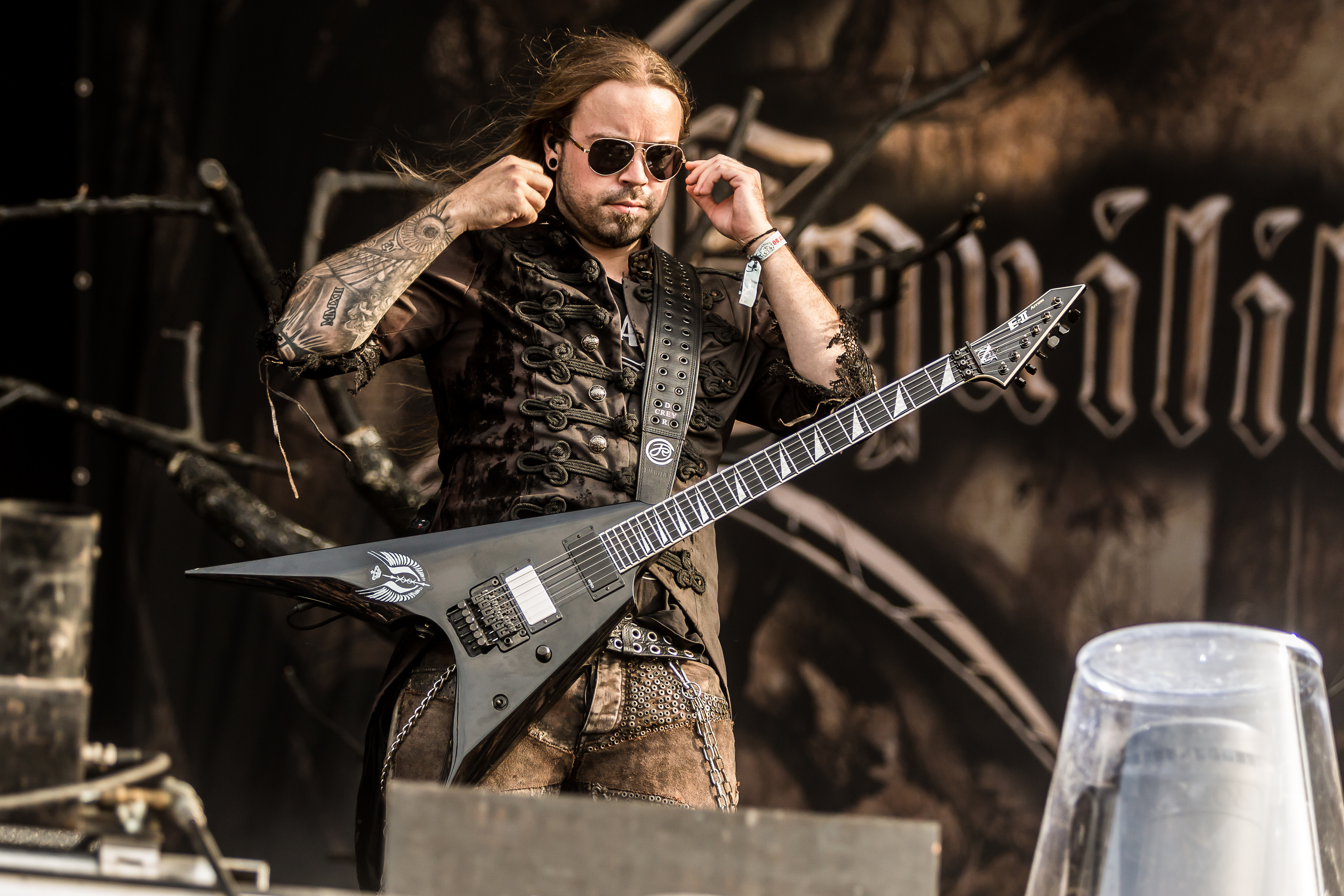
Dominik "Dom" Crey

Former members

- Dom R. Crey – guitars, unclean vocals (2014–2025)
- Martin "Skar" Berger – bass, clean vocals (2019–2024)
- Robert "Robse" Dahn – unclean and clean vocals (2010-2022)
- Makki Solvalt – bass (2016–2019)
- Jen Majura – bass (2014–2015)
- Andreas Völkl − guitars (2001–2014)
- Sandra Van Eldik − bass (2001–2014)
- Helge Stang − unclean and clean vocals (2001–2010)
- Manuel DiCamillo − drums (2006–2010)
- Markus Perschke − drums (2005–2006)
- Basti Kriegl − drums (2005)
- Julius Koblitzek − drums (2003–2004)
- Henning Stein − drums (2001–2003)
- Armin Dörfler − keyboards (2005–2006)
- Conny Kaiser − keyboards (2002–2003)
- Michael Heidenreich − keyboards (2001–2002)

== Discography ==
=== Studio albums ===
- Turis Fratyr (2005) – Black Attakk
- Sagas (2008) – Nuclear Blast
- Rekreatur (2010) – Nuclear Blast
- Erdentempel (2014) – Nuclear Blast
- Armageddon (2016) – Nuclear Blast
- Renegades (2019) – Nuclear Blast
- Equinox (2025) – Nuclear Blast

=== Singles ===
- "Die Affeninsel" (2010) – Nuclear Blast
- "Karawane" (2014) – Nuclear Blast
- "One Folk" (2020) – Nuclear Blast
- "Revolution" (2021) – Nuclear Blast
- "XX" (2021) – Nuclear Blast
- "Shelter" (2023) – Nuclear Blast
- "Cerulean Skies" (2023) – Nuclear Blast
- "Gnosis" (2024) - Nuclear Blast
- "Bloodwood" (2025) - Nuclear Blast
- "I'll Be Thunder" (2025) - Nuclear Blast
- "Borrowed Waters" (2025) - Nuclear Blast

=== EPs ===
- Waldschrein (2013) – Nuclear Blast

=== Demos ===
- Demo 2003 (2003)

=== Music videos ===
- "Blut im Auge" (2008)
- "Der Ewige Sieg" (2010)
- "Wirtshaus Gaudi" (2014)
- "Eternal Destination" (2016)
- "Rise Again" (2016)
- "Renegades – A Lost Generation" (2019)
- "Path of Destiny" (2019)
- "Final Tear" (2019)
- "One Folk" (2020)
- "Revolution" (2021)
- "XX" (2021)
- "Shelter" (2023)
- "Cerulean Skies" (2023)
- "Gnosis" (2024)
- "Bloodwood" (2025)
- "I'll Be Thunder" (2025)
- "Borrowed Waters" (2025)
- "Nexus" (2025)

=== Lyric videos ===
- "Prey" (2016)
- "Born to Be Epic" (2016)
