= Erdentempel =

Studio album by Equilibrium
- Released: 6 June 2014 European Union; 9 June 2014 United Kingdom; 10 June 2014 United States
- Recorded: 2013–2014 at Helion Studios
- Genre: Folk metal, symphonic metal
- Label: Nuclear Blast Records
- Producer: René Berthiaume

Equilibrium chronology
Rekreatur (2010)	Erdentempel (2014)	Armageddon (2016)

Erdentempel is the fourth studio album by German folk metal band Equilibrium. The album contains the band's first song in English, titled "The Unknown Episode". It is the last album featuring inputs by founding members and siblings Andreas Völkl and Sandra Van Eldik, who decided to leave the band prior to its release – they did not perform on the album, which had every instrument recorded by René Berthiaume alone.

== Track listing ==
All tracks are written by René Berthiaume

No.	Title	Translation (from German)	Length
1.	"Ankunft (Instr.)"	Arrival	0:51
2.	"Was lange währt"	What Lasts Long	5:10
3.	"Waldschrein"	Woods Shrine	5:21
4.	"Karawane"	Caravan	4:52
5.	"Uns'rer Flöten Klang"	Our Flutes' Sound	4:21
6.	"Freiflug"	Free Flight	4:58
7.	"Heavy Chill"		6:06
8.	"Wirtshaus Gaudi"	Tavern Fun	2:41
9.	"Stein meiner Ahnen"	Stone of My Ancestors	5:42
10.	"Wellengang"	Waves	5:11
11.	"Apokalypse"	Apocalypse	5:14
12.	"The Unknown Episode"		5:46
13.	"Aufbruch" (bonus track)	Departure	11:16

== Personnel ==
Equilibrium

- Robert "Robse" Dahn – vocals
- René Berthiaume – guitars, keyboard, clean vocals, production, bass, drums
