= Rekreatur =

Studio album by Equilibrium
- Released: 18 June 2010
- Genres: Folk metal, symphonic black metal
- Length: 62:01
- Label: Nuclear Blast

Equilibrium chronology
Sagas (2008)	Rekreatur (2010)	Erdentempel (2014)

Professional ratings
Review scores
Source	Rating
Fury Rocks	9.5/10 stars
Lords of Metal	8.5/10 stars
Metal Hammer	5/7 stars

Rekreatur is the third studio album by German folk metal band Equilibrium, which was released on 18 June 2010. The band released the music video for "Der Ewige Sieg" on 16 June 2010. On 11 June, the album in its entirety was available for streaming from the band's official MySpace until 18 June.

== Track listing ==
No.	Title	Translation (from German)	Length
1.	"In Heiligen Hallen"	Inside Holy Halls	6:11
2.	"Der ewige Sieg"	The Everlasting Victory	4:16
3.	"Verbrannte Erde"	Scorched Earth	5:43
4.	"Die Affeninsel"	The Monkey Island	5:08
5.	"Der Wassermann"	The Water Man (Sprite)	6:32
6.	"Aus ferner Zeit"	From Distant Time	9:21
7.	"Fahrtwind"	Riding Wind	4:49
8.	"Wenn Erdreich bricht"	When the Soil Breaks Apart	6:59
9.	"Kurzes Epos" (instrumental)	Short Epic	13:02

Bonus CD (acoustic tracks)
No.	Title	Translation (from German)	Length
1.	"Der ewige Sieg"	The Everlasting Victory	4:18
2.	"Nach dem Winter"	After the Winter	4:11
3.	"Blut im Auge"	Blood in the Eye	4:43
4.	"Die Prophezeiung"	The Prophecy	5:09
5.	"Heimwärts"	Homewards	2:32

== Charts ==
Chart (2010)	Peak position
German Albums Chart	20

== Personnel ==
- Robert "Robse" Dahn – lead vocals
- René Berthiaume – guitar/keyboards
- Andreas Völkl – guitar
- Sandra Völkl – bass
- Manuel DiCamillo – drums

== In popular culture ==
- YouTuber MeltingMan234 uses the acoustic version of "Heimwärts" as his intro.
