= Knorkator =

German band

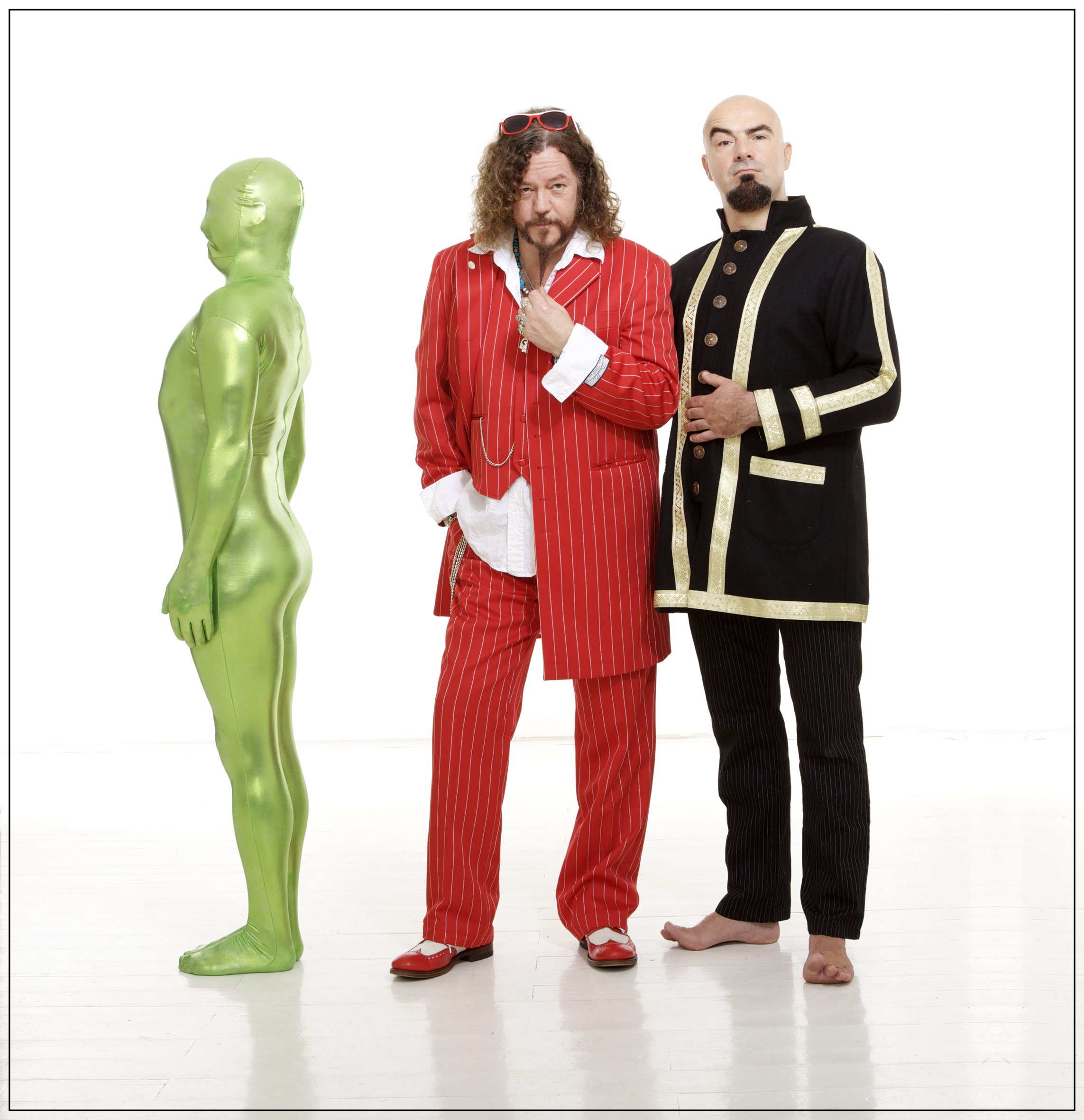
- Stumpen, Buzz Dee, Alf Ator (from left)

Background information
- Origin: Berlin, Germany
- Genres: Heavy metal; Neue Deutsche Härte; comedy rock
- Years active: 1994–2008, 2011–present
- Labels: Tubareckorz, Nuclear Blast
- Members: Gero Ivers; Alexander Thomas; Sebastian Baur; Rajko Gohlke; Philipp Schwab
- Past members: J. Kirk Thiele; Thomas Görsch; Christian Gerlach; Tim Schallenberg; Sebastian Meyer; Nicolaj Gogow
- Website: knorkator.de

Knorkator is a German band from Berlin that combines heavy metal with comical elements. They proclaim themselves to be "Germany's most band in the world" (German: Deutschlands meiste Band der Welt), as the title "The best band in the world" was already taken by Die Ärzte. The name Knorkator is a personification of knorke, a dated adjective used in Berlin and the Ruhr basin meaning "great" or "fabulous" (similar to the English slang word "swell"). The band was founded in 1994, but only played in the Berlin/Brandenburg area until 1998.

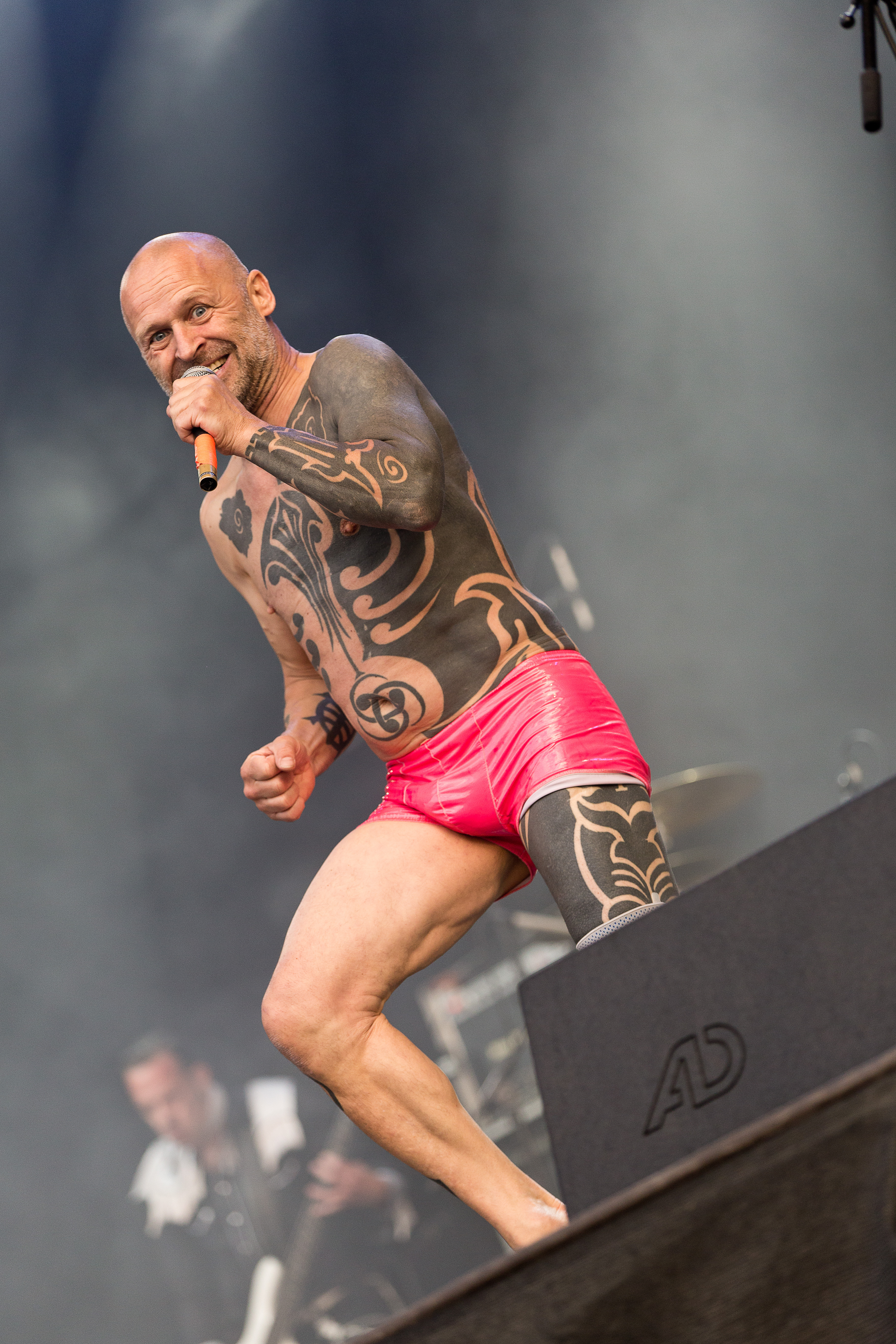
Singer Stumpen at Rockharz Open Air 2016

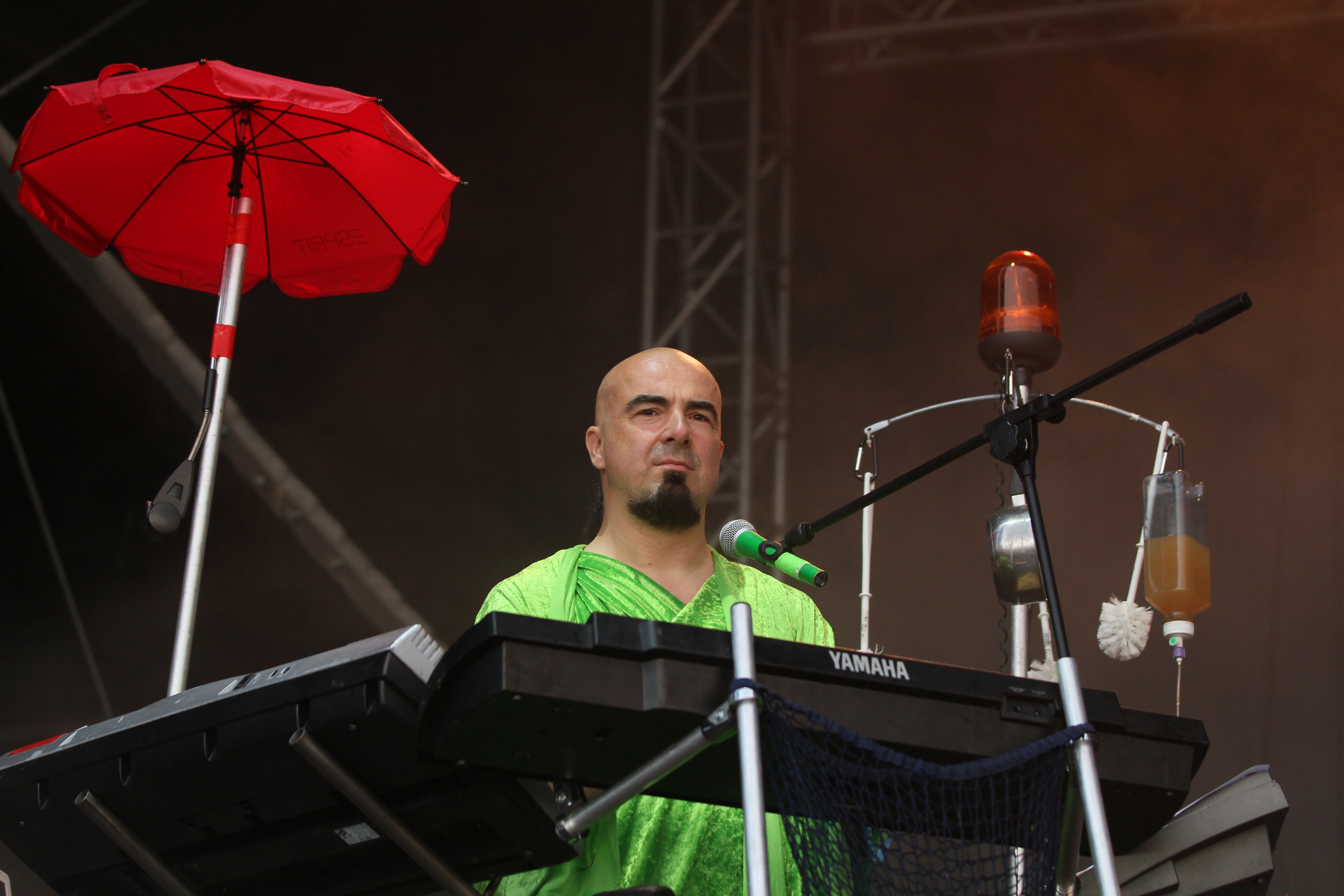
Keyboardist Alf Ator at Rockharz 2014

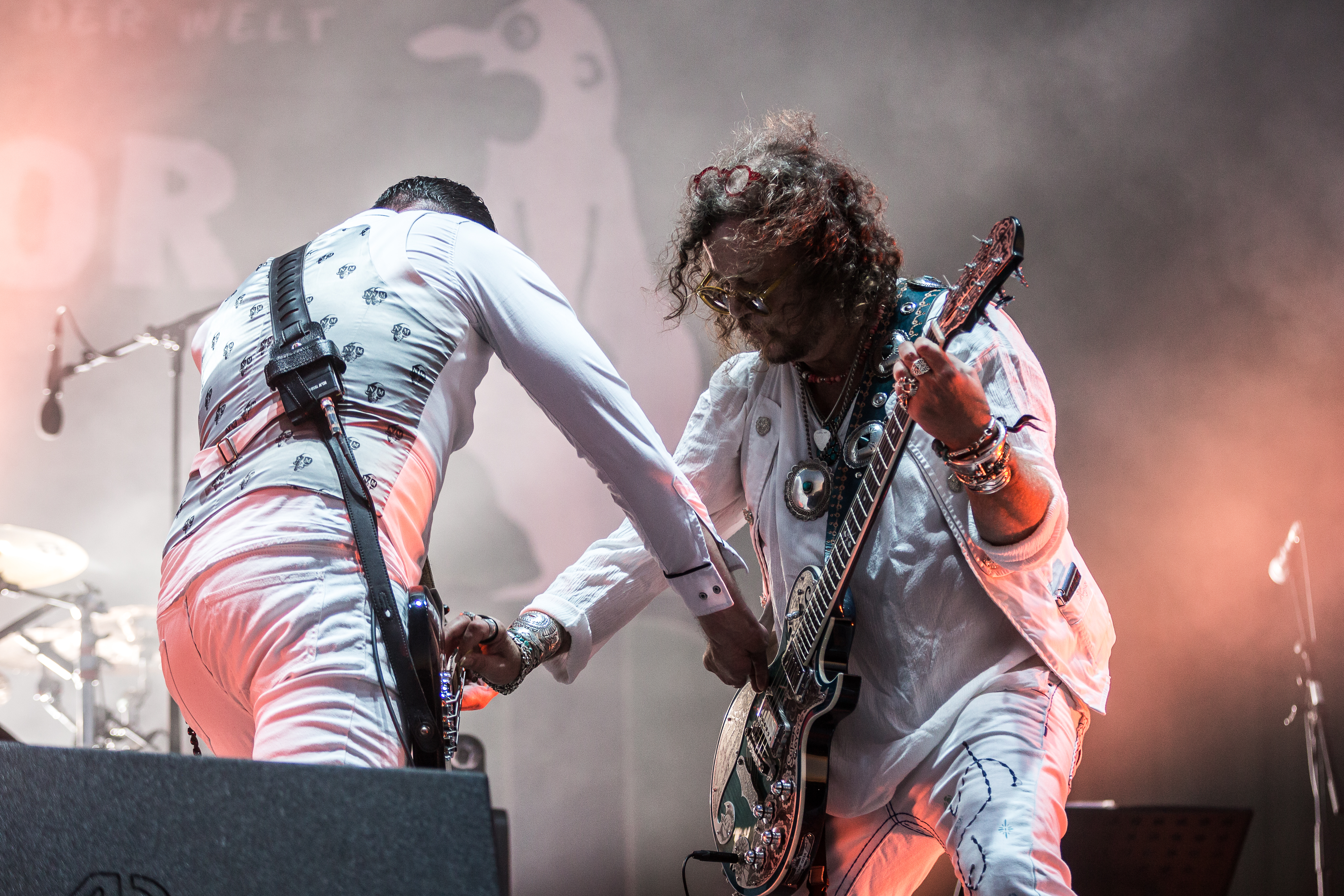
Rajko Gohlke and Buzz Dee at Rockharz Open Air 2018

Knorkator gained further fame (and some notoriety) in 2000 with their performance of Ick wer zun Schwein (sic; literally, in Berlin dialect, "I'm turning into a pig") in the German national qualification for the Eurovision Song Contest. After the qualification show, German tabloid Bild notoriously headlined "Wer ließ diese Irren ins Fernsehen?" ("Who let these lunatics on TV?").

Knorkator announced the end of the band in a MySpace bulletin on 14 June 2008, the last concert was played on 5 December that year in Berlin. The official reason given for the band's breakup was that Alf Ator wanted to leave Germany to start a new life in Thailand. In autumn 2010 a bulletin by Stumpen announced the bands' reunion. A first "small" tour followed in April 2011 as well as some concerts at well-known festivals like Wacken Open Air. The tour was called the "77 minutes tour", as the setlist was planned to be exactly 77 minutes long. A digital clock that counted down the minutes was placed on stage to make sure the time limit was not exceeded. Their new album Es werde Nicht (translates to "Let there be Not" or "Let Not Be", a pun on Es werde Licht – "Let there be Light") was in September 2011, followed by a big tour with concerts of regular length.

== Style ==
Knorkator's music can be largely classified as industrial metal, somewhat akin to White Zombie and Ministry. Knorkator, however, strongly features a comedic element. Most songs escalate into falsetto vocals and bombastic, over-the-top anthemic choruses, with crushing guitars and subtle samplers. Due to the amusing message, however, the band's considerable technical and artistic merit is sometimes overlooked.

Knorkator's lyrics are somewhat explicit, but always very humorous. Most of the band's lyrics are in German; however, some songs also feature English ("beating around the bush", "Ma Baker", etc.), Thai (Mai khao djai, Khid tyng baan), Latin (Aeger sum), or French (Ma belle fêmme, Franz Hose) lyrics. Their famous song Wir werden alle sterben ("We're all going to die") has also been translated into the Arabic language. The songs in English are often extreme covers of previously well-known hit songs.

The song Buchstabe is featured as a music video in the 3rd episode of Adult Swim's Off the Air (2011).

== Live performances ==
Knorkator's wild stage shows and appearance are chaotic: half of Stumpen's body is tattooed black, and he usually performs in his goofy underpants; Buzz Dee's appearance is often cited as being a clone of Big Jim Martin.

Knorkator are (in)famous for their wild stage shows. Alf Ator has been known to hit the audience with a large foam club, throw toast slices and wet autumn foliage at the crowd. Sometimes a modified shredder was used to distribute shredded vegetables and fruit over the crowd, which was announced as "vegetarian airway-catering". Their live performances are also well known for extensive acts of instrument destruction where especially keyboarder Alf Ator used to deconstruct one or more electronic organs that he had been playing on with a toilet brush or similar before. Singer Stumpen is known for the frequent smashing of TV sets on stage, from which he suffered a glass splinter getting stuck in his thigh that had to be removed by surgery some years later and was then auctioned on the internet. In earlier shows, a lot of furniture pieces were placed on the stage which were then destroyed during the show by Alf or Stumpen, mostly with an axe or a baseball bat. Stumpen is also known for wearing almost nothing on stage except for a woman's bathing suit or underpants.

Crowd surfing is another important element of Knorkator's shows, not only performed by the musicians themselves, but also directing the crowd to perform exceptional exercises, such as racing duels between spectators over the hands of the crowd, piggyback moshing, woman-throwing competitions, instructing the crowd to separate and then run into each other (known as the Wall of Death), or lifting and surfing the heavily overweight sound engineer from the mixing desk to the stage and back.

== Members ==
- Stumpen (Gero Ivers) – vocals
- Alf Ator (Alexander Thomas) – keyboards
- Buzz Dee (Sebastian Baur) – guitars (1996–present)
- Rajko Gohlke – bass (2010–present)
- Philipp Schwab – drums (2020–present)

=== Former members ===
- J. Kirk Thiele – guitars (until 1997)
- Thomas Görsch – drums (until 1998)
- Chrish Chrash (Christian Gerlach) – drums (1998–2003)
- Tim Buktu (Tim Schallenberg) – bass (2003–2008)
- Sebhead Emm (Sebastian Meyer) – drums (2012–2014)
- Nick Aragua (Nicolaj Gogow) – drums (2003–2012, 2014–2020)

=== Touring members ===
- Jen Majura – guitars (2012–2014)
- Philipp Schwab – drums (2014–2015)

== Discography ==
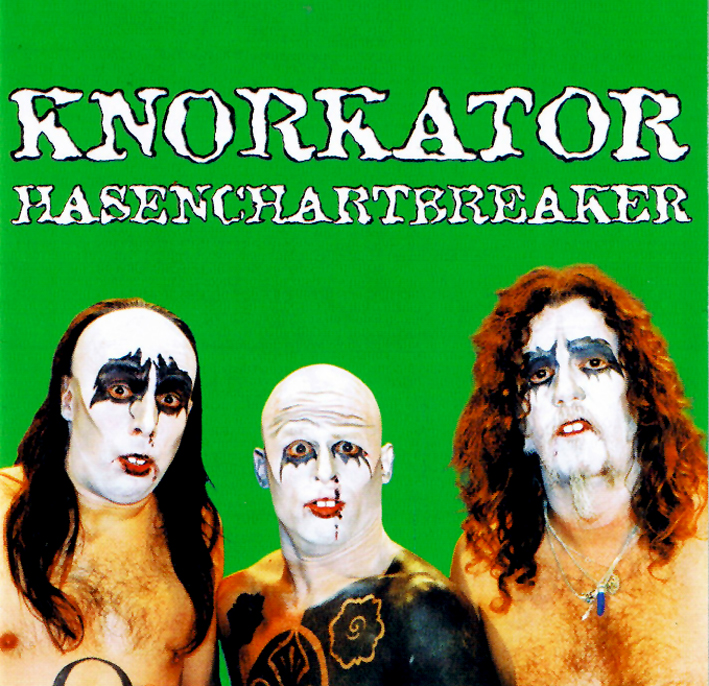
The album cover of 1999's Hasenchartbreaker

=== CD ===
- 1998: The Schlechtst of Knorkator (The baddest of Knorkator)
- 1999: Hasenchartbreaker (pun with Hasenscharte (harelip) and chartbreaker)
- 2000: Tribute to uns selbst (Tribute to ourselves)
- 2003: Ich hasse Musik (I hate music)
- 2007: Das nächste Album aller Zeiten (The next album of all time)
- 2011: Es werde Nicht (Let there be not / pun with Let there be light ["Licht"])
- 2014: We Want Mohr (We want Moore)
- 2016: Ich bin der Boss (I am the Boss)
- 2019: Widerstand ist zwecklos (Resistance [or: resistor] is futile)
- 2022: Sieg der Vernunft (Victory of reason)
- 2025: Weltherrschaft für alle (World domination for all)

=== CD (Live) ===
- 2005: Zu alt (Too old)
- 2015: KnorkaTourette

=== CD (compilations) ===
- 2002: High Mud Leader (Heimatlieder – Songs of [our] home)
- 2010: Knorkator – Mein Leben als Single (3 CD-Box Ltd. Ed.) (My life as a single)

=== DVD ===
- 2005: Zu alt (Too old)
- 2007: Gastspiel mit 143.425 Bildern (Guest performance with 143.425 images, Das nächste Album aller Zeiten bonus DVD)
- 2008: Weg nach unten (The Way down)
- 2011: Abschiedskonzert (Farewell Concert, Es werde Nicht bonus DVD)
- 2014: Zitadelle (Citadel, We Want Mohr bonus DVD)
- 2015: KnorkaTourette
- 2016: Karaoke (Ich bin der Boss bonus DVD)

=== Singles / EP ===
- 1995: A
- 1998: Böse (Evil)
- 1999: Weg nach unten (Way down)
- 1999: Buchstabe (Letter)
- 2000: Ick wer zun Schwein (I turn into a pig)
- 2000: Ich lass mich klonen (I let myself be cloned)
- 2000: Komm wieder her (Come back)
- 2003: Der ultimative Mann (The ultimate man)
- 2006: Wir werden alle sterben (We will all die)
- 2007: Alter Mann (Old Man)
- 2007: www.einliebeslied.com (www.alovesong.com)
- 2008: Kinderlied (Children's Song)

== We Want Mohr controversy ==
Knorkator were planning to go on tour in spring 2014 to present their new album We Want Mohr, which was released on 17 January 2014. The album name is a pun, replacing "more" by the German word Mohr, which is a dated term for black people that today is only used in a historical or literary context. The tour was advertised with a poster showing the five (white) band members in a big pot on a fire and a black person with bones in their hair and a knife in their hand next to it. This is a reenactment of a scene in the 19th-century child's book Struwwelpeter. The poster caused outrage in some German anti-racist blogs, and the Initiative Schwarze Menschen in Deutschland, an organisation representing black people in Germany, published a statement calling the poster racist, unreflected and degrading. Knorkator singer Gero Ivers published a response in which he claims to be shocked and disappointed by the statement and argues that the intention of the poster had been misunderstood and not seen in context. Subsequently, the band stopped using the advertising poster but refused ISD's demand to change the album cover as they viewed the content of the reenacted scene as "profoundly anti-racist".

== Bibliography ==
- Knorkator (June 2002). Des Wurzels Zweig. Eulenspiegel-Verlag. ISBN 978-3-359-01448-5.
- Knorkator (2004). Am Anfang war das Am. Eulenspiegel-Verlag. ISBN 978-3-359-01609-0.
- Alf Ator (15 March 2008). Die satanischen Achillesferse. Eulenspiegel-Verlag. ISBN 978-3-359-02200-8.
- Alf Ator (2011). The Best of fast allen Comics. Eulenspiegel-Verlag. ISBN 978-3-359-02316-6.
- Alf Ator (2015). The noch Besteren of Alf Ator, COMICS. Eulenspiegel-Verlag. ISBN 978-3-359-02460-6.
