= Jen Majura =

German rock musician

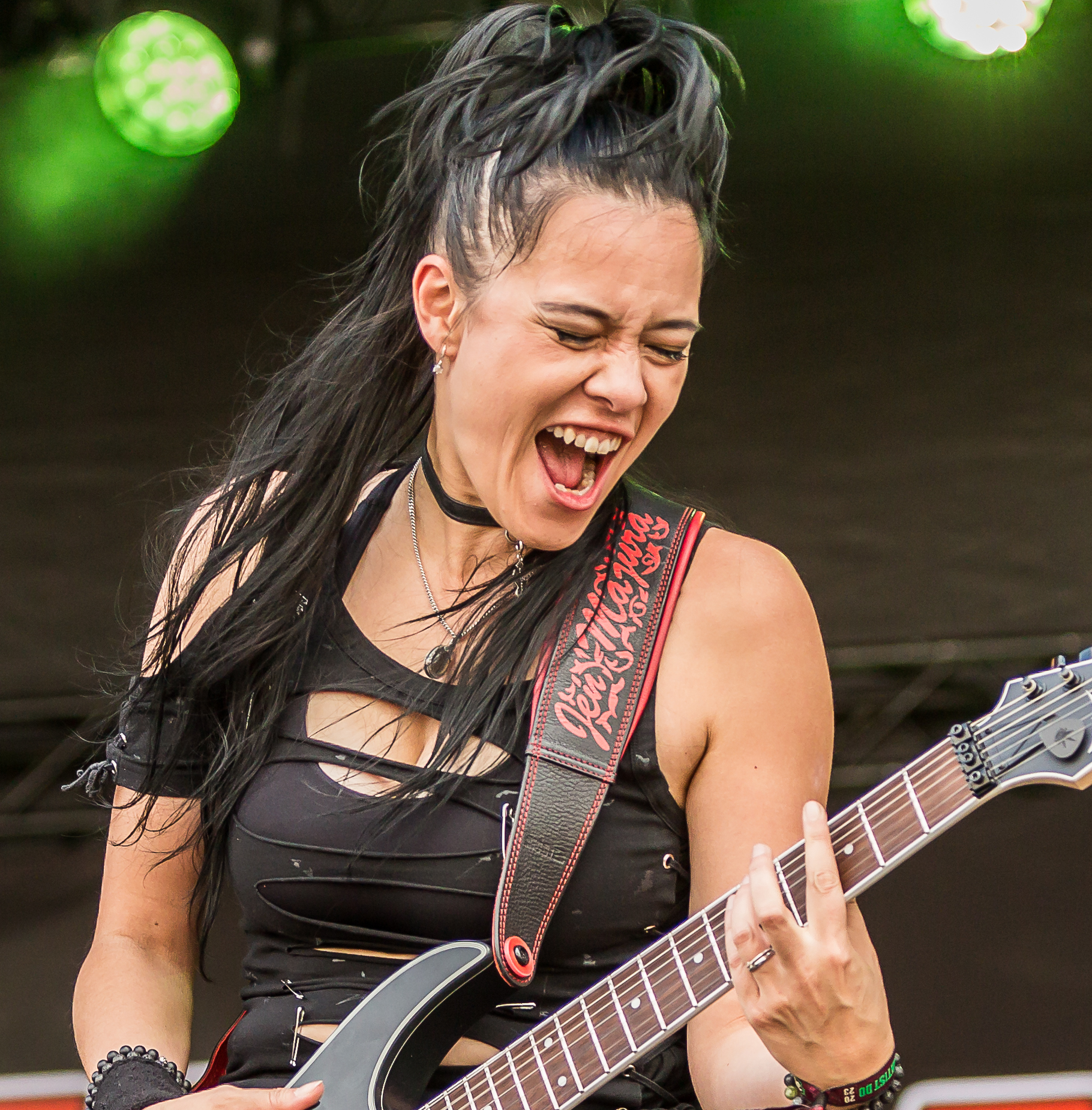
- Majura performing live with How We End in 2023

Background information
- Born: Jennifer Majura Indrasen; 16 June 1983 (age 43); Stuttgart, West Germany
- Occupation: Musician
- Instruments: Guitar; bass; vocals
- Years active: 2012–2025
- Formerly of: Knorkator; Equilibrium; Evanescence; How We End

Jennifer Majura Indrasen (born 16 June 1983) is a German musician. She played in the bands Knorkator (2012–2014), Equilibrium (2014), Evanescence (2015–2022), and How We End (2023–2025). In June 2025, she announced her retirement from the music industry.

== Biography ==
Majura was born in Stuttgart, Germany.

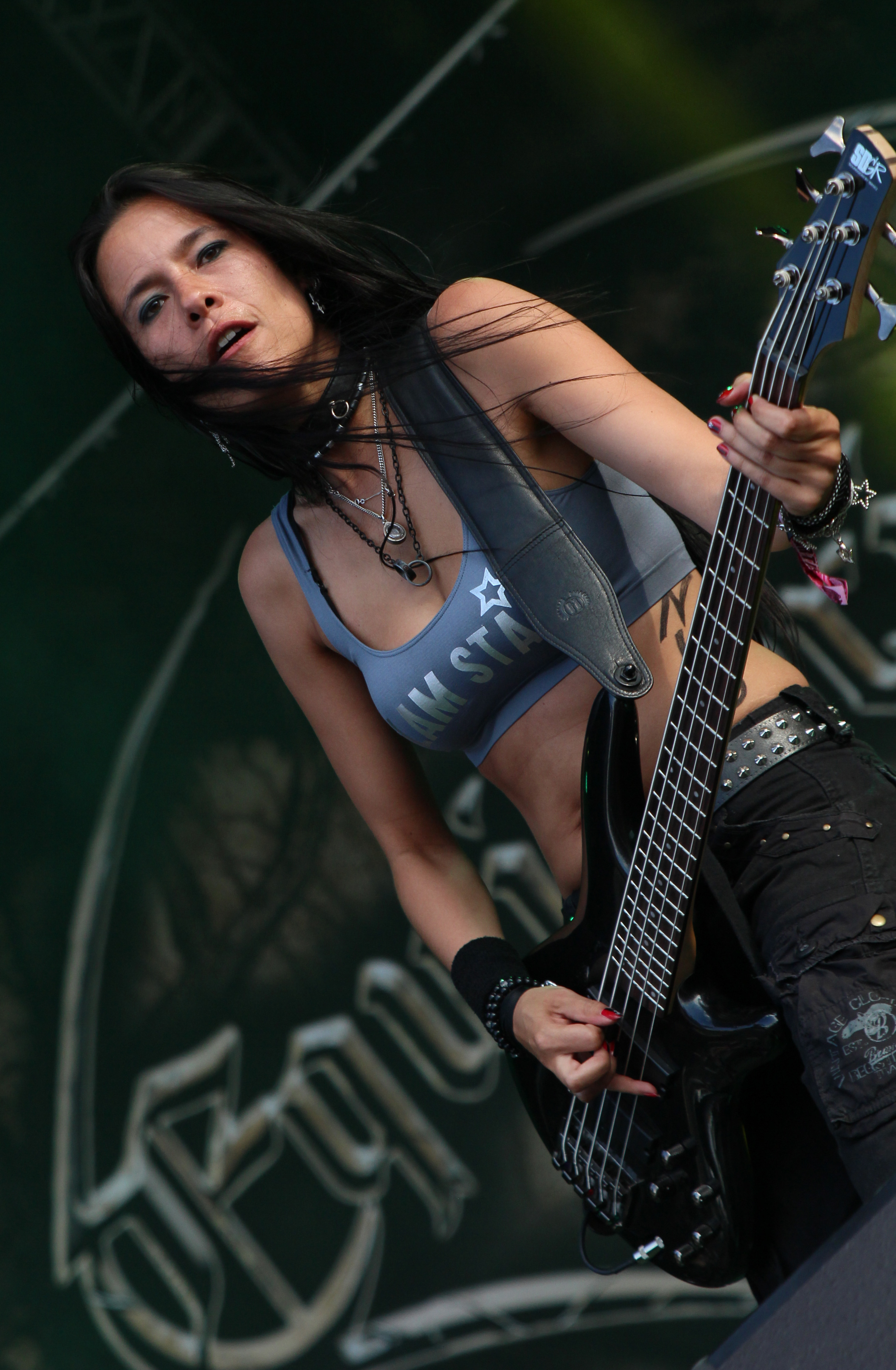
Majura with Equilibrium at Wacken Open Air in 2014.

She played in the bands Knorkator (guitarist, 2012–2014), Equilibrium (bassist, 2014) and Evanescence (guitarist, 2015–2022). In 2023, she joined the band How We End, featuring vocalists Diva Satanica (ex-Nervosa) and Jake E (Cyhra, ex-Amaranthe), guitarist Tom Naumann (Primal Fear), bassist Mitch Kunz, and drummer Adde Larsson. Their debut single, "My Fighting Heart", was released in 2023.

Majura announced her exit from the music industry on 11 June 2025, stating:

After careful consideration, observing what is going on in this music industry, AI related developments and change in society I've come to the conclusion to step away. ... While time allowed me, I was able to collect an amazing amount of beautiful experiences, tours, shows, travels and moments! I am grateful for every bit of that, but the world has changed. I can confidently make up my mind to stop."

== Discography ==
Studio albums:

- Jen Majura (2015)
- Inzenity (2017)

=== Evanescence ===
Studio albums:

- Synthesis (2017)
- The Bitter Truth (2021)

=== Mangini ===
Studio albums:

- Invisible Signs (2023)
