= Saga (singer) =

Carolina Erickson
- Also known as: Saga
- Born: 1975 (age 50–51); Sweden
- Genres: Rock Against Communism, White power music
- Occupation: Singer
- Years active: 2000–present

Saga (born 1975) is a Swedish white nationalist singer-songwriter. She started as the vocalist for Symphony of Sorrow, but has since become known for her tribute CDs to the band Skrewdriver and her solo projects, promoting white nationalism and anti-communism. She is one of the most successful Swedish white nationalist singers.

== Biography ==
Saga is the stage name of a Swedish singer born in southern Sweden in 1975. She became part of the Swedish nationalist movement in her youth. Following her tribute CDs, she gathered an international audience, playing concerts in Great Britain, Germany, and Finland in addition to Sweden, and briefly living in the United States before returning to Sweden in 2005. Having returned, she recorded a second album with Symphony of Sorrow.

Saga was featured on the front cover of the Fall 2000 edition of Resistance magazine, a United States neo-Nazi publication. Shaun Walker of the National Alliance, a United States white power advocacy group, wrote: "... just having her in front of the camera helps our Cause. But, she also is quite good at interviews. She comes across as the girl-next-door, who also understands the dynamics of racial conflict." In an interview, Saga stated, "What I want is for people to listen to my music and go, ‘Oh, she feels the same. I’m not alone.’ My music should be an option for normal people who feel that there is something wrong, but they don't have to go out and get punched in the nose for it."

Saga and her music were mentioned by Anders Behring Breivik in the manifesto that he e-mailed before he detonated a bomb in Oslo in 2011. He referred to her as "the world's best and most talented English speaking patriotic musician". In response to this, Saga posted an official statement on her website condemning Breivik's actions, saying "It has come to my attention that my music has been cited ... as going some way to inspiring one of the most vile and criminal acts in recent history. I cannot begin to describe how saddened I am to hear that and wanted to inform you all of my shock and utter horror at such an atrocity."

== Discography ==
in Symphony of Sorrow

- Paradise Lost (2000)
- Symphony of Hatred (2005)

as Saga

- Live and Kicking (2000)
- My Tribute to Skrewdriver Volume 1 (2000)
- My Tribute to Skrewdriver Volume 2 (2000)
- My Tribute to Skrewdriver Volume 3 (2001)
- Midgård – Pro Patria III (2003)
- On my own (2007) Repackaged in 2014 as My own way
- Comrades Night Live (2009)
- Weapons of choice (2014) Repackaged in 2017 as Choice of weapons

== See also ==
- Blood and Honour
- Rock Against Communism
- Neo-Nazism
