= Northwest High School (Grand Island, Nebraska) =

High school in Nebraska, United States

Coordinates: 40.952163°N 98.398605°W

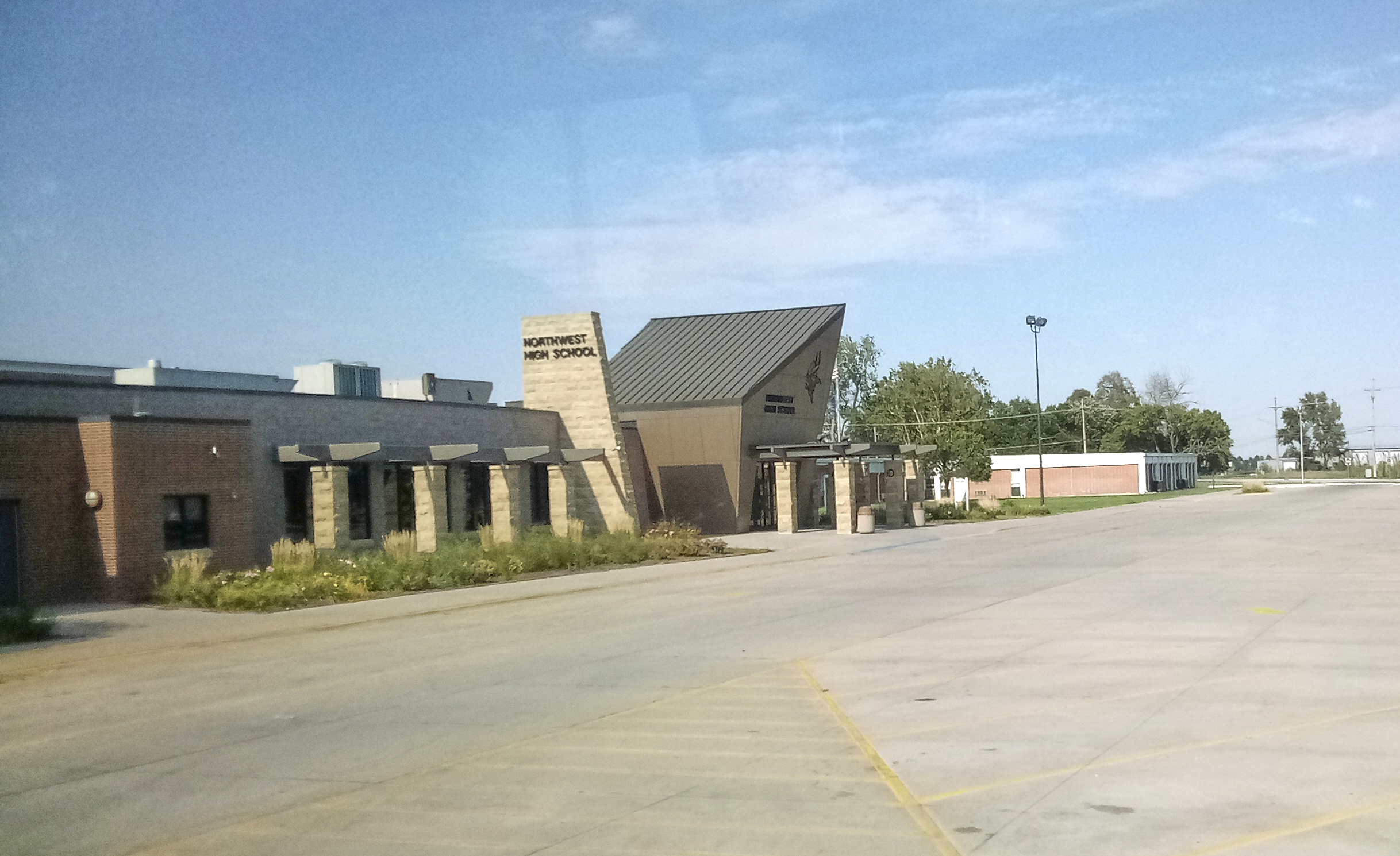

Location
- 2710 North North Road; Grand Island, (Hall County), Nebraska 68803; United States

Information
- Type: Public high school
- Principal: P.J. Smith
- Staff: 51.18 (FTE)
- Enrollment: 653 (2023-2024)
- Student to teacher ratio: 12.76
- Colors: Black, Vegas gold and white
- Athletics conference: Central 10 Conference
- Nickname: Vikings

Northwest High School is a secondary school in Grand Island, Nebraska, United States, and is part of the Northwest Public Schools district. It was founded in 1963. It is accredited by AdvancED. The school serves students in grades nine through twelve. Enrollment at the high school was 719 as of December 2016.

Northwest High School colors are black and gold. The mascot is a Viking, and pupils are referred to as Northwest Vikings.

Northwest High School is a member of the Nebraska School Activities Association (NSAA). They compete in District IV and Central West conference.

The school is in the city limits of Grand Island. However, none of the district's taxation and attendance boundary covers any part of the Grand Island city limits.

== History ==
Northwest High School was formed in response to overcrowding at Grand Island Senior High School. The overcrowding even with just local students was so severe that the Grand Island school board demanded that 16 rural school districts in Hall and Merrick counties that, at the time, sent their high school students there consolidate with it or find somewhere else to educate their high school-aged students. As a consolidation would have resulted in tax increases for rural property owners, the school districts instead formed a Class VI school district—the Nebraska term for a union school district that only educated high school students, with a separate school board—and passed a $793,000 bond issue in order to erect a new facility. The new school was forecast to immediately serve 200 students. Opened as Grand Island Class VI High School in August 1963, the name was changed that September to Northwest High School upon a student vote.

In 2022, the school administration shut down the school's student newspaper after transgender staff refused to comply with the school's demand to use their deadnames on article bylines. In response, the American Civil Liberties Union filed a lawsuit against the school. Although the lawsuit was dismissed due to a student's having graduated, Judge Gerrard wrote: "school administrators would be wise to remember that policies and decisions to restrict speech in student newspapers ... may run afoul of the First Amendment if they 'reflect an effort to suppress expression merely because the public officials oppose a speaker's view'."

== Notable alumni ==
- Rick Allen, sportscaster
- Brian Mohr
- Max Rookstool
