= Lacrymosa (song) =

2006 song by Evanescence

Song by Evanescence

from the album The Open Door
- Released: September 25, 2006
- Recorded: 2005–2006; Seattle
- Length: 3:37
- Label: Wind-up
- Songwriters: Amy Lee; Terry Balsamo
- Producer: Dave Fortman

Live video
- "Lacrymosa" on YouTube

"Lacrymosa" is a song by American rock band Evanescence from their second studio album, The Open Door (2006). The song was composed by singer and pianist Amy Lee and guitarist Terry Balsamo, with production by Dave Fortman and choral arrangements by Lee. It incorporates the Lacrimosa sequence from Mozart's Requiem (1791), which was originally performed in the key of D minor and transposed into E minor for the song.

Lee, a David Campbell–led orchestra, and a choir recorded "Lacrymosa" at a chapel in Seattle, Washington. The song contains elements of several genres, including classical music, gothic rock, progressive rock, and industrial rock. "Lacrymosa" garnered generally positive reviews from music critics, who praised Lee's vocals and arrangement and deemed it one of the most memorable songs on The Open Door. An alternate version appears on the band's fourth studio album Synthesis (2017).

== Composition and recording ==
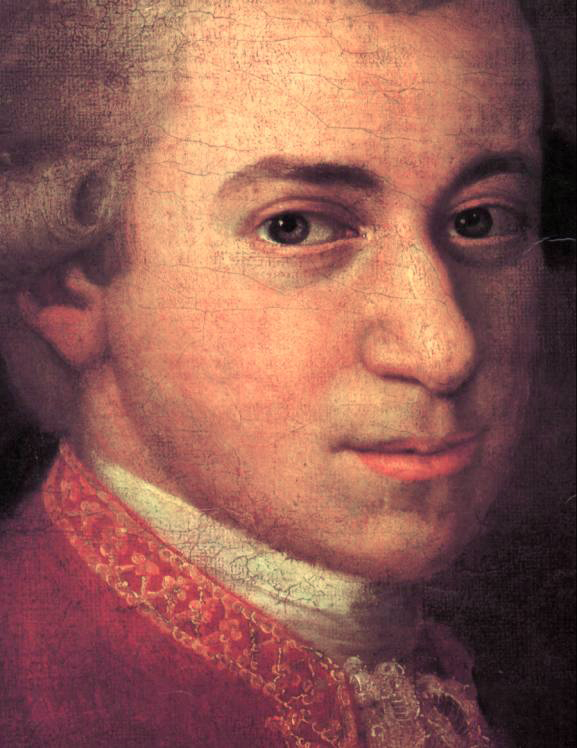
The song incorporates the Lacrimosa sequence of Mozart's Requiem (1791).

"Lacrymosa" was written by Amy Lee and Terry Balsamo, and produced by Dave Fortman. It incorporates the Lacrimosa sequence of Mozart's Requiem (1791), which is Lee's favorite piece of music. David Campbell led a 22-piece orchestra, and the Millennium Choir performed the latin stanzas from "Lacrimosa" as backing vocals. Lee, the orchestra and the choir recorded the song at a chapel in Seattle, Washington.

Lee began writing Lacrymosa in 2004, when she was writing for the soundtrack of the film The Chronicles of Narnia: The Lion, the Witch and the Wardrobe, which did not materialize and was one of the songs rejected by the studio for being "too dark". Lee stated that she had always wanted to make Lacrimosa from Mozart's Requiem a metal song, and The Open Door was "the time for that, for trying things I hadn't been brave enough to try before." In an interview with VH1, Lee explained the inspiration behind the song:

I saw Amadeus when I was nine years old and fell in love with Mozart. The part of Mozart's Requiem called "Lacyrmosa" [sic] is my favorite piece of music ever. I always wished we could cover it, but with programming and guitars and make it cool. It's our moment to try all the things I wanted to and couldn't, so I started messing with it in Protools. Terry wrote some riffs and turned it into this awesome metal epic.

According to the sheet music published by Alfred Publishing on Musicnotes.com, the original Lacrimosa sequence was performed in D-minor, and it was transposed into E-minor in the song. Lee's vocals range from the low note of B_{3} to the high note of E_{5}; the SATB choir vocals range from the low note of B_{2} to the high note of E_{4}.

The Gauntlet writer Claire Colette said the song features a "violin intro, synth worth of a Nine Inch Nails album, and Omen-esque choral sections that are very haunting." Rob Sheffield from Rolling Stone wrote that "Lacrymosa" has Lee "sobbing hysterically over a grand piano". IGN reviewer Ed Thompson characterized the track as having the "trademark Evanescence sound - Lee's celestial voice", her "brooding lyrics", along with "electronic backing beats, symphonic string section", heavy guitar, and "an ethereal choir backing track, giving the track a contrasting representation of light and dark". Writing for Billboard, Gary Graff noted that it incorporates elements of progressive rock and classical music. John Hood from the Miami New Times opined that, thematically, "'Call Me When You're Sober' sent a man away, "Lacrymosa" kept him there, and "Cloud Nine" told the clueless dolt why he would no longer ever be welcomed back. Kerrang!'s Sam Law said that the title is a "take on the Latin term for "weeping"" and Lee's lyrics "evocatively revisit the tears shed in the years preceding."

In 2017, Lee and Campbell reworked "Lacrymosa" into a fully orchestral version with electronic percussion for Evanescence's fourth studio album, Synthesis. In this version, Lee performed all the operatic vocals in backing and lead vocals.

== Critical reception ==
"Lacrymosa" received generally positive reviews from music critics. Ed Thompson from IGN deemed it the "most memorable track" on the album. Don Kaye of the Blabbermouth.net felt that while the song was an "interesting experiment" it came "across as more of a stab at artsiness with its strings and choirs than a real song." A writer of The Independent recommended the song on his "Download This" list for The Open Door. Postmedia News said that Lee "achieves stunning notes on "Lacrymosa", which employs a haunting choir". Richard Harrington of The Washington Post said Lee gave a "dramatic prog-rock makeover" to Lacrimosa, describing it as a "dynamic rocker".

The New York Times's Kelefa Sanneh regarded the song as "grandiose even by the album's standards" and "an audacious, exhilarating blast" in which "Evanescence sounds huge". Writing for Billboard, Gary Graff considered it one of the album's triumphant "melodramatic goth/industrial anthems". Claire Colette of The Gauntlet called it a "haunting" song, USA Today's Edna Gundersen deemed it "wonderfully bombastic", and Revolver's Zoe Camp dubbed it a "standout". The Sydney Morning Herald viewed the track as the album's centerpiece. W. Andrew Powell of TheGATE.ca said the "soaring" song is one of the album's highlights that "really leave their mark". Kerrang! reviewer Nick Ruskell wrote that the classical parts and heavy guitars in the song "entwine perfectly to create a stunning Wagnerian wall of choir-led dark majesty".

Metal Hammer said that, over the years, "Lacrymosa" became one of the band's "best loved tracks." In a 2021 article by The Evening Standard, for which classical music performers recommend pieces of music as an introduction to classical music, conductor Kalena Bovell recommended "Lacrymosa" as an example of classical music's influence on a band, writing that Lee's "celestial voice is mesmerising, soaring above a brooding melody that is elevated by the use of an SATB choir".

== Personnel ==
Credits adapted from The Open Door liner notes.

- Vocals, keyboards, choral arrangements, additional programming – Amy Lee
- Guitar – Terry Balsamo
- Guitar – John LeCompt
- Bass guitar – Will Boyd
- Drums – Rocky Gray
- Choir performance – Millennium Choir: Susan Youngblood, Talaya Trigueros, Mary Gaffney, Alyssa Campbell, Bebe Gordon, Melanie Bruno, Dwight Stone, Eric Castro, Darryl Phinnessee, Tamara Berard, Kevin Dalbey, Marcella Carmona, Tania Themmen, Joanne Paratore, Lisa Wall-Urgero
- Strings – Seattlemusic
- Programming – DJ Lethal
- Production, mixing – Dave Fortman
- Engineering – Jeremy Parker
- Mastering – Ted Jensen
