= Viking Saga censorship incident =

2022 student newspaper incident in Grand Island, Nebraska

Front page of the June 2022 issue of the Viking Saga

The Viking Saga is the student newspaper of Northwest High School in Grand Island, Nebraska, in the United States. In April 2022, the staff of the paper were told that transgender writers should not use their preferred names on bylines and instead must use the names they had been given at birth.

On May 16, the paper published an issue which discussed Pride Month and other LGBTQ-related topics. Three days later, the school board and superintendent eliminated the school's journalism program and closed down the paper. In response, the American Civil Liberties Union filed a lawsuit asserting that transgender staff member Marcus Pennell's First Amendment right to free speech had been violated. The lawsuit was dismissed on the grounds that Pennell, having already graduated, lacked standing.

== Background ==
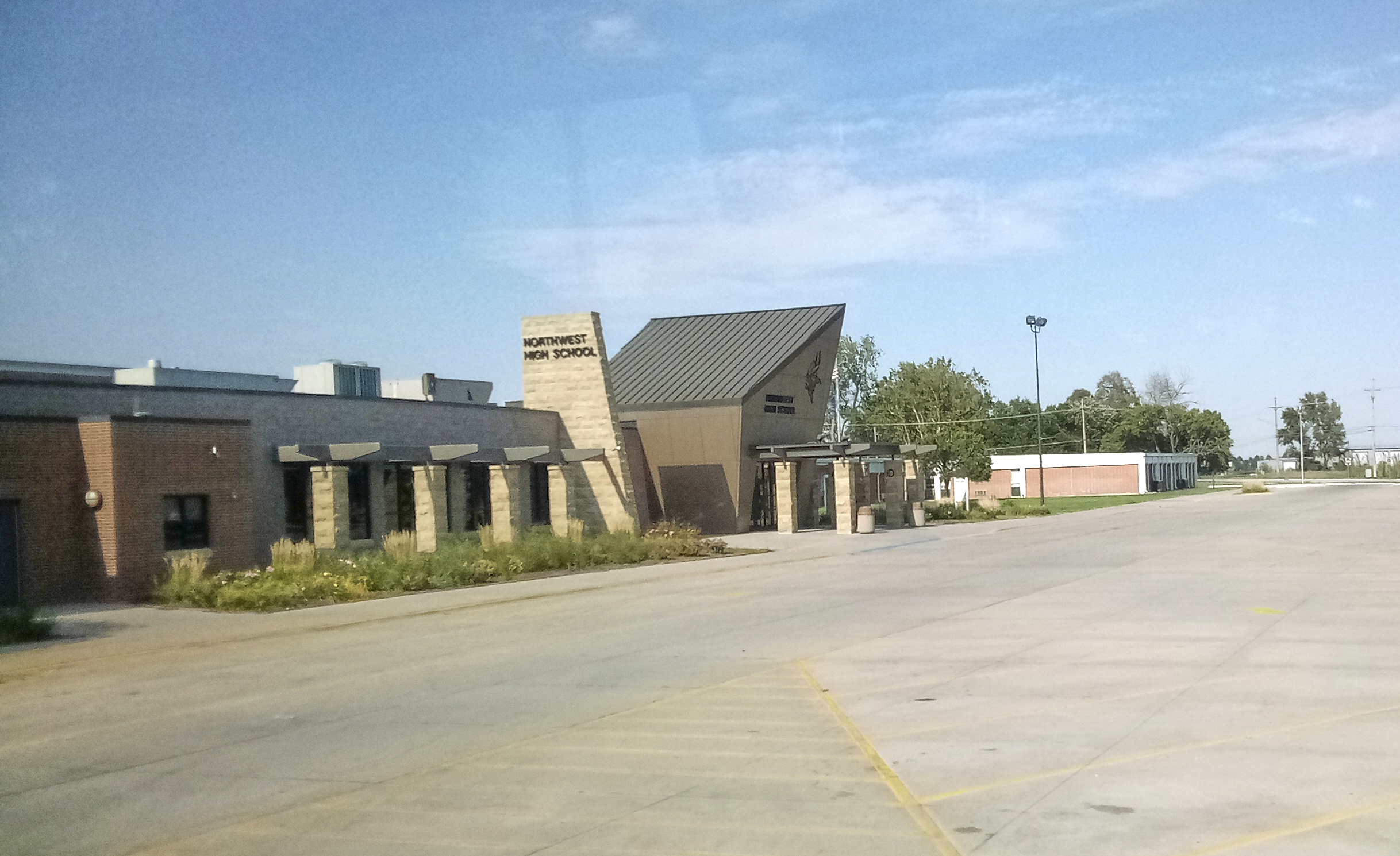
Northwest High School in 2022

Northwest High School is a secondary school in Grand Island, Nebraska built in 1962. The school's student newspaper, the Viking Saga, began publication in 1968, running for 54 years. In 2022, the last year of publication, student journalists from Northwest Public Schools district finished in third place in the Nebraska School Activities Association's state journalism championship.

In April 2022, Northwest Public Schools issued a reprimand to the Viking Saga because transgender staff were using their preferred pronouns and chosen names in article bylines. Margaret Renkl, in a New York Times guest essay, observed that the Viking Saga had "at least three transgender staff members". The administration instructed the staff that they should be using birth names, a practice known as deadnaming. According to Marcus Pennell, a transgender columnist for the Viking Saga who graduated in 2022, the students were coerced into obeying by being told that their faculty advisor would suffer the consequences if they did not comply. Pennell described the administration as bullying LGBT students.

== Shutdown ==
The June 2022 issue, printed on May 16, included a number of student editorials on LGBTQ-related topics, as well as a news article about Pride Month, which occurs annually in June. On May 19, the Viking Saga's staff was informed that the journalism program was to be shut down. A letter was sent to the newspaper's printer on May 22 canceling the use of their printing services. Jeanette Ramsey, the director of teaching and learning of Northwest Public Schools, stated that the decision to shut down the newspaper was made by the school principal P. J. Smith and the school board's superintendent of schools Jeff Edwards.

Dan Leiser, the president of the Northwest Public Schools Board of Education, remarked in reference to the controversial stories that "most people were upset they were written". Zach Mader, the vice president of the board, stated: "I do think there have been talks of doing away with our newspaper if we were not going to be able to control content that we saw (as) inappropriate." An unnamed employee of the Northwest School District stated that "the (journalism and newspaper) program was cut because the school board and superintendent are unhappy with the last issue's editorial content".

== Response ==
On August 31, Edwards said that news reports on the incident by the media were "both correct and incorrect", adding that publication of the Viking Saga was only paused and that other student journalism activities such as the yearbook were continuing. He stated that it was "misleading" to characterize the reason for the actions against the newspaper as being based on a small number of published articles.

Mike Hiestand, a senior legal counsel for the Student Press Law Center (SPLC), said that schools were increasingly shutting down student newspapers as a form of censorship, observing that "you can't censor a student newspaper you no longer have". He observed that the most common censorship trigger was a story that criticized the school or one that the administration perceived as making them look bad. According to a lawyer from the SPLC, who was a former student of the school and was present at the time of the incident, the administration considered it "controversial" that the student journalists were using their preferred names instead of the names they were assigned at birth. SPLC executive director Hadar Harris said that this was not the only case of censorship of a school newspaper in the state, writing that "Nebraska has become a center for a number of egregious censorship cases in recent years, but the Saga's case also indicates a nationwide trend of administrators increasingly censoring LGBTQIA+ related content, including chosen names and pronouns".

The Nebraska branch of the American Civil Liberties Union (ACLU) said that the move was viewpoint discrimination that violated the Constitution of the United States. In a letter to Edwards, the ACLU chapter said that shutting down the Viking Saga violated the students' rights under the First and Fourteenth Amendments, as well as Title IX protections against sexual discrimination, noting that "the district cannot censor student journalism because district leadership disagrees with LGBTQ rights and wishes to keep students from encountering viewpoints that do not align with that perceived viewpoint".

In November 2022, New York City schools chancellor David Banks was asked about the incident during a roundtable discussion with student journalists from local schools. He stated:

I stand for freedom of expression for student journalists here and all across the country ... Education should always be about hearing varying points of views whether you agree with [them] or disagree with [them]. You may not be supportive of the LGBTQ community in your own personal space ... but to say we can't even have a series where we're talking about those issues is completely wrong.

Commenting on the statement by chancellor Banks, Hillary Davis of the SPLC said:

there is nothing in New York City or in New York State that prevents an issue like what happened with the Viking Saga from happening at any school in New York. And so while the chancellor is giving a full throated support and that's amazing, there is currently no law, there is no policy

In October 2022, Ava Tse, news editor of the Latin School of Chicago's Forum argued that the Viking Saga's shutdown "probably does not violate the students' First Amendment rights". She did however note a trend towards increasing censorship of student newspapers, with The Forum and the University of Chicago Laboratory High School's Midway being unusual among independent high school papers in central Chicago in that neither is subject to administration censorship. Tse pointed to the Francis W. Parker School's Parker Weekly as having "been subjected to an administrative approval process since the spring of 2019". Tse also said that as these three were all independent schools, their papers may enjoy fewer constitutional protections than papers at public schools.

In November 2022, The Grand Island Independent reported that – according to Northwest teacher Kirsten Gilliland – the school administration had agreed to let the paper continue publication, in an online format and under the supervision of a different faculty member. Gilliland was the paper's previous adviser. In February 2023, The Independent reported that English teacher Alex Hull had taken over teaching the journalism class and was the new adviser to the paper, but the Viking Saga had not yet resumed publication.

== Lawsuit ==
On March 31, 2023, the Nebraska ACLU filed a lawsuit in federal court against the Northwest Public School District and superintendent Edwards on behalf of the Nebraska High School Press Association and Marcus Pennell, citing violations of the First Amendment. ACLU policy counsel Jane Seu stated that "the filing is symbolic of a greater national push against LGBTQ youth".

The suit was dismissed on October 16, 2023, in an order by federal senior judge John M. Gerrard. Gerrard determined that Pennell could not prove injury because having already graduated, the shutting down of the paper no longer impacted him. Nebraska ACLU's Rose Godinez disagreed with Gerrard's finding that the plaintiffs lacked standing; she emphasized that the ruling was narrowly focused on standing and "we welcome its general warning to school administrators on restricting speech in student newspapers". A statement by the SPLC said that the ruling "cautioned schools that viewpoint discrimination in student media is unconstitutional", and quoted Judge Gerrard:

school administrators would be wise to remember that policies and decisions to restrict speech in student newspapers ... may run afoul of the First Amendment if they 'reflect an effort to suppress expression merely because the public officials oppose a speaker's view'.

SPLC executive director Gary Green added that "the ruling was a clear signal to schools not to overstep the First Amendment" and that "officials should heed the judge's warning to avoid censoring student media for speech they simply disagree with".

== Related Supreme Court cases ==
Scott Shackford of Reason magazine took exception to the school administration's closure of the Viking Saga, observing that the decision was based not on the quality of the writing but rather on the opinions expressed by the publication. They said that practicing writing and debating skills was an important part of the educational experience and cited two relevant United States Supreme Court decisions. Tinker v. Des Moines Independent Community School District (1969) asserted that "students do not lose their First Amendment freedoms on school grounds" but Hazelwood v. Kuhlmeier (1988) gave school boards "wide authority to censor school newspapers".

In her essay, Margaret Renkl said that the censorship allowed by Hazelwood could be applied to student newspapers which were "part of a school curriculum" and had to be for "educational reasons". Renkl quoted an analysis of Hazelwood by the Legal Information Institute of Cornell Law School:

Educators do not offend the First Amendment by exercising editorial control over the style and content of student speech in school-sponsored expressive activities so long as their actions are reasonably related to legitimate pedagogical concerns.

In October 2022, Mike Hiestand of the SPLC told Rachel Martin of WNYC that based on Tinker, "as long as the speech didn't result in a serious disruption of normal school activity, so as long as it was lawful, as long as it was peaceful, that was pretty much where the bar was". According to Hiestand, that changed in 1988 when the Supreme Court ruled "that school officials could censor school-sponsored student newspapers where they had a reasonable educational justification".

Max Kautsch, an attorney for the Nebraska Press Association who specializes in media law, said that "the decision by the administration to eliminate the student newspaper violates students' right to free speech, unless the school can show a legitimate educational reason for removing the option to participate in a class ... that publishes award-winning material", adding that "it is hard to imagine what the legitimate reason could be". The Grand Island Independent reported that print media has a constitutional right to determine its editorial content, citing the 1974 case Miami Herald Publishing Co. v. Tornillo.
