= Imperfection (song) =

Single by Evanescence

from the album Synthesis
- Released: September 15, 2017
- Recorded: February–August 2017
- Studio: Spaceway Productions
- Genre: Electronic; symphonic
- Length: 4:22
- Label: BMG
- Songwriter: Evanescence
- Producers: Will Hunt (Spaceway); Amy Lee

Evanescence singles chronology
"Lost in Paradise" (2012)	"Imperfection" (2017)	"Hi-Lo" (2018)

Music video
- "Imperfection" on YouTube

"Imperfection" is a song by American rock band Evanescence from their orchestral-electronica fourth studio album, Synthesis (2017). It was released as the lead single from the album on September 15, 2017. Amy Lee wrote the song about fighting for one's life, from the perspective of someone left behind after a loss. Produced by Will "Spaceway" Hunt and Lee, "Imperfection" fuses electronic and symphonic music with trip hop percussion. An accompanying music video was released on October 19, 2017.

== Background and composition ==
"Imperfection" is a song on Synthesis. On the album, the songwriting is credited to Evanescence and programmer Will B. "Spaceway" Hunt, with production by Hunt and Amy Lee. The recording process and making of the song is featured in the documentary From the Inside: The Creation of Synthesis, which was included in the deluxe edition of the album. A clip of it is uploaded to the band's YouTube channel as part of the webisodes titled Inside Synthesis.

Lee wrote the song from the perspective of someone "left behind" after a loss to suicide and depression. For Lee, it was the most important song on the album, describing it as a "plea to fight for your life", and not giving in to the fear; "I have to tell myself that every day. Nobody is perfect ... it's precisely those imperfections that make us who we are, and we have to embrace them because there's so much beauty in those differences. Life is worth fighting for. You are worth fighting for.". Lee confessed in 2019 that the song became "more special" to her following her brother's passing in January 2018.

"Imperfection" has a "classical base", and fuses electronic and symphonic music with influences from EDM, hip hop music and R&B, featuring trip hop beats, a "swaggering cadence" and belting from Lee. On the album, it is preceded by a piano solo that transitions into the song. Lyrically, the track was described by NME as "an emotional moment dealing with suicide and depression."

== Release and reception ==
"Imperfection" was released as the album's lead single for digital download and streaming on September 15, 2017.

Rolling Stone's Ryan Reed stated that Evanescence "achieve electronic-symphonic symmetry" on the song. Stephen Dalton of Classic Rock commented that both of the album's new songs are "classy, stadium-sized anthems that couch soaring Bond-theme melodrama in supple trip-hop shudders and sumptuous, vaguely Middle Eastern string swirls. Kerri-Ann Roper of Belfast Telegraph highlighted "Imperfection" as one of the great tracks on the album. Kerrang!'s Sam Law praised the song's composition. Writing for Alternative Press, Jordan Toney said it's "the perfect mixture of classic Evanescence along with mixing in their new sound" and the "quick pacing of Lee's voice almost provides a suspenseful feel that's only relieved when Lee hits those long notes that she can hit so well."

== Music video ==
"Imperfection"'s video premiered first on NME on October 19, 2017, before being available on Evanescence's YouTube channel. The piano solo that segues into "Imperfection" on the album introduces the song in the video.

== Track listing ==
Digital download
No.	Title	Length
1.	"Imperfection"	4:23

== Personnel ==
Credits adapted from the liner notes of Synthesis.

- Amy Lee – vocals, piano, producer
- Will "Spaceway" Hunt – producer, programming, synths, engineer
- David Campbell – orchestra arrangement and conducting
- Damian Taylor – mixing engineer
- Nick Spezia – orchestral engineering
- Gary Hedden – additional audio editing
- Emily Lazar – mastering engineer
- Chris Allgood – mastering assistance

== Charts ==
Chart (2017)	Peak position
US Alternative Digital Song Sales (Billboard)	19
US Hot Rock & Alternative Songs (Billboard)	39
US Rock Digital Song Sales (Billboard)	21

== Release history ==
Region	Date	Format	Label	Ref.
United States	September 15, 2017	Digital download; streaming	BMG	
