= Saga: Rage of the Vikings =

1998 video game

- Developer(s): Cryo Interactive
- Publisher(s): Cryo Interactive
- Platform(s): Windows
- Release: 1998
- Genre(s): Real-time strategy

Saga: Rage of the Vikings is a French real-time strategy video game developed and published by Cryo Interactive in 1998 on Windows. The game is loosely based on the historical Vikings (or Norsemen), with various elements taken from the Norse mythology as well. The gameplay sees players gather resources, constructing buildings and training units as well as defeating other competitors or enemies.

== Critical reception ==
GameBlitz felt the game was competent, yet non-innovative. Game Over Online thought the game was a disappointment due to not being particularly groundbreaking. Generation4 compared the game to the Age of Empires series developed by Ensemble Studios and Microsoft Games.
