= Sagas (album) =

Studio album by Equilibrium
- Released: 27 June 2008
- Recorded: 2007–2008
- Studio: Helion Studios (Munich)
- Genres: Folk metal, symphonic black metal
- Length: 79:14
- Label: Nuclear Blast
- Producers: René Berthiaume; Seref Badir; Alex Ross; Chrisoph Klatt; Jay Ester

Equilibrium chronology
Turis Fratyr (2005)	Sagas (2008)	Rekreatur (2010)

Professional ratings
Review scores
Source	Rating
About.com	4/5 stars
Allmusic	4/5 stars

Sagas is the second studio album by German folk metal band Equilibrium, released on 27 June 2008.

== Track listing ==
All lyrics are written by Helge Stang; all music is composed by René Berthiaume, except where noted.

No.	Title	Translation (from German)	Length
1.	"Prolog auf Erden"	Prologue on Earth	3:39
2.	"Wurzelbert"	Hermit	4:59
3.	"Blut im Auge"	Blood in the Eye	4:45
4.	"Unbesiegt"	Undefeated	6:19
5.	"Verrat"	Betrayal	6:05
6.	"Snüffel"	Snuff (Austro-Bavarian)	5:45
7.	"Heimwärts" (Music by Berthiaume, Stang, Andreas Völkl, Sandra Völkl)	Homeward	2:34
8.	"Heiderauche" (instrumental)	Heath Smoke	2:31
9.	"Die Weide und der Fluß"	The Willow and the River	7:21
10.	"Des Sängers Fluch"	The Bard's Curse	8:05
11.	"Ruf in den Wind"	Call Into the Wind	4:54
12.	"Dämmerung"	Twilight	5:55
13.	"Mana" (instrumental)		16:23

== Personnel ==
- Helge Stang − vocals
- René Berthiaume − guitar
- Andreas Völkl − guitar
- Sandra Völkl − bass guitar
- Manuel DiCamillo − drums

=== Special guest musicians ===
- Kurt Angerpower – guitar
- Ulrich Herkenhoff – pan flute
- Muki Seiler – accordion
- Agnes Malich – violin
- Gaby Koss – vocals
- Jörg Sieber
- Toni González (Karlahan vocalist)
- Karlahan crew

== Notes ==
1. The word "Wurzelbert" (though "Wurzel" means "root") has no direct English translation, but Helge Stang describes it as "an ugly man living in the woods and looking like some kind of nature-bum or something, [with] roots instead of fingers."
