= List of songs recorded by Evanescence =

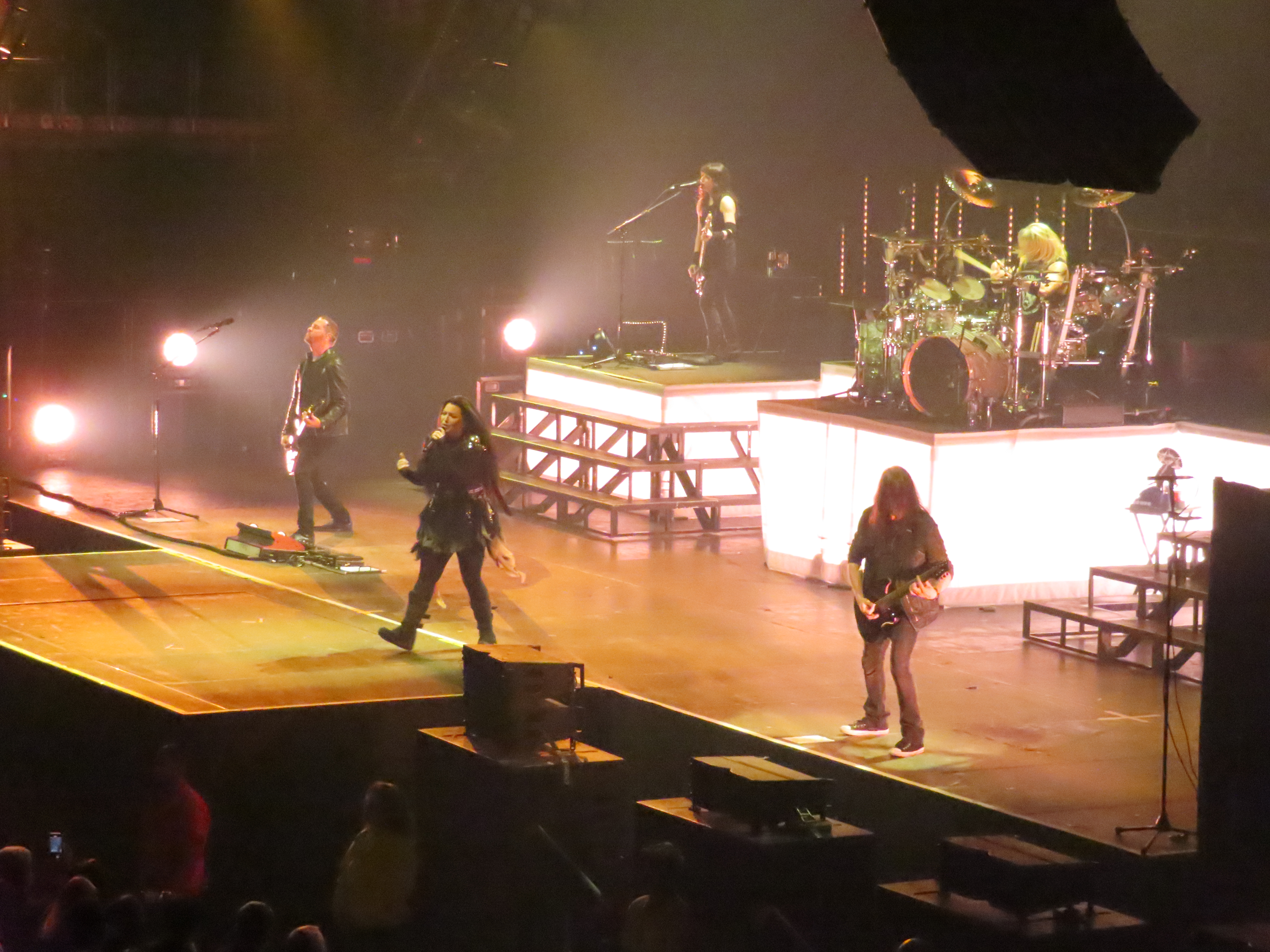
Evanescence performing in 2022

American rock band Evanescence has recorded five studio albums, three extended plays, two demo albums, and their music has appeared on two soundtrack albums. Evanescence was founded by Amy Lee and Ben Moody in 1994. The band's lineup comprises Lee, guitarist Troy McLawhorn, guitarist Tim McCord, drummer Will Hunt, and bassist Emma Anzai.

Produced by Dave Fortman, their debut studio album, Fallen (2003), spawned the singles "Bring Me to Life", "Going Under", "My Immortal", and "Everybody's Fool". Evanescence's second studio album, The Open Door (2006), yielded the singles "Call Me When You're Sober", "Lithium", "Sweet Sacrifice", "Good Enough". Released in 2011, their self-titled third studio album was produced by Nick Raskulinecz, with the songs "What You Want", "My Heart Is Broken", and "Lost in Paradise" released as singles. Evanescence marked the first time an album was co-written as a band.

In March 2014, Evanescence parted ways with record label Wind-Up Records and became an independent band. In 2017, the band released their fourth studio album, Synthesis, an orchestral and electronic re-imagining of past songs alongside two new songs, "Imperfection" and "Hi-Lo". The band released their fifth studio album, The Bitter Truth, in 2021, preceded by the songs "Wasted on You", "The Game is Over", "Use My Voice", and "Better Without You".

== Released songs ==
Key
†	Indicates single release
‡	Indicates song written solely by Amy Lee
#	Indicates promotional single release
•	Indicates song containing non-English lyrics

Song	Artist(s)	Writer(s)	Release(s)	Year	Ref.
"Across the Universe" • (Note: "Across the Universe" is a 1969 song originally performed by The Beatles.)	Evanescence	Lennon–McCartney	The Bitter Truth (Note: Song appears on the album as a bonus track.)	2021	
"Afterlife" †	Evanescence	Amy Lee; Alex Seaver	Sanctuary	2025	
"All That I'm Living For"	Evanescence	Amy Lee; John LeCompt	The Open Door	2006	
"Anywhere"	Evanescence	Amy Lee; Ben Moody; David Hodges	Origin	2000	
"Artifact/The Turn"	Evanescence	Amy Lee ‡	The Bitter Truth	2021	
"Ascension of the Spirit" (Note: Song is an instrumental track and contains no lyrics.)	Evanescence	Unknown	Sound Asleep / Whisper	1999	
"Avocado Cream"	Evanescence	Unknown	Evolution	2021	
"Away From Me"	Evanescence	Amy Lee; Ben Moody; David Hodges	Origin	2000	
"Back to the Future"	Evanescence	Unknown	Evolution	2021	
"Better Without You" †	Evanescence	Amy Lee; Tim McCord; Troy McLawhorn; Will Hunt; Nick Raskulinecz	The Bitter Truth	2021	
"Blind Belief"	Evanescence	Amy Lee; Tim McCord; Troy McLawhorn; Will Hunt	The Bitter Truth	2021	
"Blind Belief"	Evanescence	Amy Lee; Tim McCord; Troy McLawhorn; Will Hunt	Evolution	2021	
"Breathe No More"	Evanescence	Amy Lee ‡	Elektra: The Album	2005	
"Breathe No More"	Evanescence	Amy Lee ‡	Lost Whispers	2016	
"Bring Me to Life" † # (Note: Single spawned from Fallen.) (Note: Song was released as a promotional single for Synthesis.)	Evanescence featuring Paul McCoy	Amy Lee; Ben Moody; David Hodges	Fallen	2003	
"Bring Me to Life" † #	Evanescence featuring Paul McCoy	Amy Lee; Ben Moody; David Hodges	Daredevil: The Album	2003	
"Bring Me to Life" † #	Evanescence	Amy Lee; Ben Moody; David Hodges	Synthesis	2017	
"Broken Pieces Shine"	Evanescence	Amy Lee; Tim McCord; Troy McLawhorn; Will Hunt; Jen Majura	The Bitter Truth	2021	
"Broken Pieces Shine"	Evanescence	Amy Lee; Tim McCord; Troy McLawhorn; Will Hunt; Jen Majura	Evolution (Note: The demo title of "Broken Pieces Shine" on Evolution is known as “BPS #7.1”.)	2021	
"Call Me When You're Sober" †	Evanescence	Amy Lee; Terry Balsamo	The Open Door	2006	
"Cloud Nine"	Evanescence	Amy Lee; Terry Balsamo	The Open Door	2006	
"Cruel Summer" (Note: "Cruel Summer" is a 1983 song originally performed by Bananarama.)	Evanescence	Sara Dallin; Siobhan Fahey; Steve Jolley; Tony Swain; Keren Woodward	The Bitter Truth	2021	
"Disappear"	Evanescence	Amy Lee; Terry Balsamo; Tim McCord; Troy McLawhorn; Will Hunt	Evanescence	2011	
"Disappear"	Evanescence	Amy Lee; Terry Balsamo; Tim McCord; Troy McLawhorn; Will Hunt	Lost Whispers	2016	
"End of the Dream"	Evanescence	Amy Lee; Terry Balsamo; Tim McCord; Will Hunt; Will B. Hunt	Evanescence	2011	
"End of the Dream"	Evanescence	Amy Lee; Terry Balsamo; Tim McCord; Will Hunt; Will B. Hunt	Synthesis (Note: The Synthesis version of "End of the Dream" is known as "The End of the Dream".)	2017	
"Erase This"	Evanescence	Amy Lee; Terry Balsamo; Tim McCord; Troy McLawhorn; Will Hunt	Evanescence	2011	
"Eternal" (Note: "Eternal" consists of two songs: "Eternal" and "Demise". "Listen to the Rain" was originally intended to be included in-between the two songs but was eventually scrapped.)	Evanescence	Amy Lee; Ben Moody; David Hodges	Origin	2000	
"Even in Death" (Note: Song samples White Zombie's 1998 song "Ratfinks, Suicide Tanks and Cannibal Girls".)	Evanescence	Amy Lee; Ben Moody; David Hodges	Origin	2000	
"Even in Death"	Evanescence	Amy Lee; Ben Moody; David Hodges	Lost Whispers	2016	
"Everybody's Fool" †	Evanescence	Amy Lee; Ben Moody; David Hodges	Mystary	2003	
"Everybody's Fool" †	Evanescence	Amy Lee; Ben Moody; David Hodges	Fallen	2003	
"Exodus"	Evanescence	Amy Lee; Ben Moody	Evanescence (EP)	1998	
"Far From Heaven"	Evanescence	Amy Lee ‡	The Bitter Truth	2021	
"Farther Away"	Evanescence	Amy Lee; Ben Moody; David Hodges	Mystary	2003	
"Farther Away"	Evanescence	Amy Lee; Ben Moody; David Hodges	"Bring Me to Life" single	2003	
"Farther Away"	Evanescence	Amy Lee; Ben Moody; David Hodges	Fallen (Japanese edition)	2003	
"Farther Away"	Evanescence	Amy Lee; Ben Moody; David Hodges	Lost Whispers	2016	
"Farther"	Evanescence	Unknown	Evolution	2021	
"Feeding the Dark"	Evanescence	Amy Lee; Tim McCord; Troy McLawhorn; Will Hunt; Will B. Hunt	The Bitter Truth	2021	
"Field of Innocence" (Note: "Field of Innocence" samples "Morning Hymn" from the Preludium of the Broadway musical version of The Sound of Music.)	Evanescence	Amy Lee; Ben Moody; David Hodges	Origin	2000	
"Fight Like a Girl" †	Evanescence	K.Flay; Amy Lee; Dylan Eiland; Tyler Bates	Ballerina	2025	
"Forgive Me"	Evanescence	Amy Lee; Ben Moody	Sound Asleep / Whisper	1999	
"Give Unto Me"	Evanescence	Amy Lee ‡	Sound Asleep / Whisper	1999	
"Glory Box" (Note: "Glory Box" is a 1995 song originally performed by Portishead. The version that appears on The Bitter Truth was recorded during Evanescence's virtual concert, A Live Session from Rock Falcon Studio, in 2020.)	Evanescence	Portishead; Isaac Hayes	The Bitter Truth	2021	
"Going Under" †	Evanescence	Amy Lee; Ben Moody; David Hodges	Fallen	2003	
"Good Enough" †	Evanescence	Amy Lee ‡	The Open Door	2006	
"Heart-Shaped Box" (Note: Evanescence covered an acoustic version of Nirvana's 1993 song "Heart-Shaped Box" at some shows in early 2003. The version that appears on the "Going Under" single was recorded during a performance at WXDX-FM.)	Evanescence	Kurt Cobain	"Going Under" single	2003	
"Haunted"	Evanescence	Amy Lee; Ben Moody; David Hodges	Fallen	2003	
"Hello"	Evanescence	Amy Lee; Ben Moody; David Hodges	Fallen	2003	
"Hi-Lo" †	Evanescence featuring Lindsey Stirling	Amy Lee; Will B. Hunt	Synthesis	2017	
"If You Don't Mind"	Evanescence	Amy Lee; Terry Balsamo; Will Boyd	Lost Whispers	2016	
"Imaginary" # (Note: "Imaginary" was released as a promotional single for Fallen.)	Evanescence	Amy Lee; Ben Moody; David Hodges	Evanescence (EP)	1998	
"Imaginary" #	Evanescence	Amy Lee; Ben Moody; David Hodges	Origin	2000	
"Imaginary" #	Evanescence	Amy Lee; Ben Moody; David Hodges	Mystary	2003	
"Imaginary" #	Evanescence	Amy Lee; Ben Moody; David Hodges	Fallen	2003	
"Imaginary" #	Evanescence	Amy Lee; Ben Moody; David Hodges	Synthesis	2017	
"Imperfection" †	Evanescence	Amy Lee; Tim McCord; Troy McLawhorn; Will Hunt; Jen Majura; Will B. Hunt	Synthesis	2017	
"Lacrymosa" # (Note: Song samples the Lacrimosa sequence from Mozart's Requiem (1791).)	Evanescence	Amy Lee; Terry Balsamo	The Open Door	2006	
"Lacrymosa" #	Evanescence	Amy Lee; Terry Balsamo	Synthesis	2017	
"Lies" (Note: Two songs share the name "Lies". The unreleased version is sometimes known as "Lies" (Post-Origin).)	Evanescence featuring Bruce Fitzhugh	Amy Lee; Ben Moody	Origin	2000	
"Like You"	Evanescence	Amy Lee ‡	The Open Door	2006	
"Lithium" †	Evanescence	Amy Lee ‡	The Open Door	2006	
"Lithium" †	Evanescence	Amy Lee ‡	Synthesis	2017	
"Lose Control"	Evanescence	Amy Lee; Terry Balsamo	The Open Door	2006	
"Lost in Paradise" †	Evanescence	Amy Lee ‡	Evanescence	2011	
"Lost in Paradise" †	Evanescence	Amy Lee ‡	Synthesis	2017	
"Lost Whispers"	Evanescence	Amy Lee ‡	Lost Whispers	2016	
"Made of Stone" # (Note: "Made of Stone" was released as a promotional single for Evanescence.)	Evanescence	Amy Lee; Terry Balsamo; Tim McCord; Troy McLawhorn; Will Hunt; Will B. Hunt	Evanescence	2011	
"Made of Stone" #	Evanescence	Amy Lee; Terry Balsamo; Tim McCord; Troy McLawhorn; Will Hunt; Will B. Hunt	Underworld: Awakening (soundtrack) (Note: "Made of Stone" was remixed by Renholdër for Underworld: Awakening (Original Motion Picture Soundtrack).)	2012	
"Missing" # (Note: "Missing" was released as a promotional single for Anywhere but Home.)	Evanescence	Amy Lee; Ben Moody; David Hodges	"Bring Me to Life" single (Australian edition)	2003	
"Missing" #	Evanescence	Amy Lee; Ben Moody; David Hodges	Anywhere but Home	2004	
"Missing" #	Evanescence	Amy Lee; Ben Moody; David Hodges	Lost Whispers	2016	
"Music Box" (Note: Song is a demo of “Better Without You”.)	Evanescence	Unknown	Evolution	2021	
"My Heart Is Broken" †	Evanescence	Amy Lee; Terry Balsamo; Tim McCord; Zach Williams	Evanescence	2011	
"My Heart Is Broken" †	Evanescence	Amy Lee; Terry Balsamo; Tim McCord; Zach Williams	Synthesis	2017	
"My Immortal" †	Evanescence	Amy Lee; Ben Moody; David Hodges	Origin	2000	
"My Immortal" †	Evanescence	Amy Lee; Ben Moody; David Hodges	Mystary	2003	
"My Immortal" †	Evanescence	Amy Lee; Ben Moody; David Hodges	Fallen (Note: The band version of "My Immortal" was also added onto later pressings of Fallen.)	2003	
"My Immortal" †	Evanescence	Amy Lee; Ben Moody; David Hodges	Daredevil: The Album	2003	
"My Immortal" †	Evanescence	Amy Lee; Ben Moody; David Hodges	Synthesis	2017	
"My Last Breath"	Evanescence	Amy Lee; Ben Moody; David Hodges	Mystary	2003	
"My Last Breath"	Evanescence	Amy Lee; Ben Moody; David Hodges	Fallen	2003	
"Never Go Back"	Evanescence	Amy Lee; Terry Balsamo; Tim McCord; Will Hunt	Evanescence	2011	
"Never Go Back"	Evanescence	Amy Lee; Terry Balsamo; Tim McCord; Will Hunt	Synthesis	2017	
"New Way to Bleed"	Evanescence	Amy Lee; Terry Balsamo	Evanescence	2011	
"New Way to Bleed"	Evanescence	Amy Lee; Terry Balsamo	Avengers Assemble (soundtrack) (Note: "New Way to Bleed" was remixed by Photek for Avengers Assemble: Music from and Inspired by the Motion Picture and known as "A New Way to Bleed".)	2012	
"New Way to Bleed"	Evanescence	Amy Lee; Terry Balsamo	Lost Whispers	2016	
"Oceans"	Evanescence	Amy Lee; Terry Balsamo; Tim McCord	Evanescence	2011	
"On My Own"	Evanescence	Unknown	Evolution	2021	
"Origin"	Evanescence	Amy Lee; Ben Moody; David Hodges	Origin	2000	
"Overture"	Evanescence	Amy Lee ‡	Synthesis	2017	
"Part of Me"	Evanescence	Amy Lee; Tim McCord; Troy McLawhorn; Will Hunt; Jen Majura	The Bitter Truth	2021	
"Red Stickers"	Evanescence	Unknown	Evolution	2021	
"Say You Will"	Evanescence	Amy Lee; Terry Balsamo; Tim McCord	Evanescence	2011	
"Say You Will"	Evanescence	Amy Lee; Terry Balsamo; Tim McCord	Lost Whispers	2016	
"Secret Door"	Evanescence	Amy Lee; Will B. Hunt	Evanescence	2011	
"Secret Door"	Evanescence	Amy Lee; Will B. Hunt	Lost Whispers	2016	
"Secret Door"	Evanescence	Amy Lee; Will B. Hunt	Synthesis	2017	
"Sick"	Evanescence	Amy Lee; Terry Balsamo; Tim McCord; Will Hunt; Will B. Hunt	Evanescence	2011	
"Smurfs on Fire"	Evanescence	Unknown	Evolution	2021	
"Snow White Queen"	Evanescence	Amy Lee; Terry Balsamo	The Open Door	2006	
"So Close" (Note: Evanescence covered So Close's self-titled song in 1998. So Close was a band formed by Ben Moody, Will Boyd and Matt Outlaw prior to Evanescence.)	Evanescence	Ben Moody; Will Boyd; Matt Outlaw	Evanescence (EP)	1998	
"Solitude"	Evanescence	Amy Lee; Ben Moody	Evanescence (EP)	1998	
"Sweet Sacrifice" †	Evanescence	Amy Lee; Terry Balsamo	The Open Door	2006	
"Swimming Home"	Evanescence	Amy Lee; Will B. Hunt	Evanescence	2011	
"Take Cover"	Evanescence	Amy Lee; Tim McCord; Troy McLawhorn; Will Hunt; Will B. Hunt	The Bitter Truth	2021	
"Take Cover"	Evanescence	Amy Lee; Tim McCord; Troy McLawhorn; Will Hunt; Will B. Hunt	Evolution	2021	
"Taking Over Me"	Evanescence	Amy Lee; Ben Moody; David Hodges; John LeCompt	Fallen	2003	
"Teleportation"	Evanescence	Unknown	Evolution	2021	
"The Chain" † (Note: "The Chain" is a 1977 song originally performed by Fleetwood Mac.)	Evanescence	Lindsey Buckingham; Mick Fleetwood; Christine McVie; John McVie; Stevie Nicks	Non-album single (Note: "The Chain" was released to promote the 2019 video game Gears 5.)	2019	
"The Chain" †	Evanescence	Lindsey Buckingham; Mick Fleetwood; Christine McVie; John McVie; Stevie Nicks	The Bitter Truth	2021	
"The Change"	Evanescence	Amy Lee; Terry Balsamo; Tim McCord; Troy McLawhorn; Will Hunt	Evanescence	2011	
"The End"	Evanescence	Amy Lee; Ben Moody	Evanescence (EP)	1998	
"The Game Is Over" †	Evanescence	Amy Lee; Tim McCord; Troy McLawhorn; Will Hunt	The Bitter Truth	2020	
"The Game Is Over" †	Evanescence	Amy Lee; Tim McCord; Troy McLawhorn; Will Hunt	Evolution (Note: The demo title of "The Game Is Over" on Evolution is abbreviated to "GIO".)	2021	
"The In-Between" (piano solo)	Evanescence	Amy Lee ‡	Synthesis	2017	
"The Last Song I'm Wasting On You"	Evanescence	Amy Lee ‡	"Lithium" single	2006	
"The Last Song I'm Wasting On You"	Evanescence	Amy Lee ‡	Evanescence (Japanese edition)	2011	
"The Last Song I'm Wasting On You"	Evanescence	Amy Lee ‡	Lost Whispers	2016	
"The Only One" (Note: The introduction to "The Only One", which features three distinctive duck quacks, is a sample of an unreleased song called "Tuna Afternoon". The song was written by Amy Lee and Terry Balsamo during the making of The Open Door for fun but was eventually added to the beginning of "The Only One".)	Evanescence	Amy Lee; Terry Balsamo	The Open Door	2006	
"The Other Side" #	Evanescence	Amy Lee; Terry Balsamo; Tim McCord	Evanescence	2011	
"Thoughtless" (Note: Evanescence covered Korn's 2002 song "Thoughtless" on their Fallen tour in 2004. The version that appears on Anywhere but Home was recorded at a concert at Le Zénith in Paris.)	Evanescence	Reginald Arvizu; Jonathan Davis; James Shaffer; David Silveria; Brian Welch	Anywhere but Home	2004	
"Together Again" #	Evanescence	Amy Lee ‡	Non-album single (Note: "Together Again" was released as a charity single in 2010 to help raise money for the United Nations Foundation after the 2010 Haiti earthquake.)	2010	
"Together Again" #	Evanescence	Amy Lee ‡	Lost Whispers	2016	
"Tourniquet" (Note: "Tourniquet" is a reworked version of Soul Embraced's 2000 song, "My Tourniquet".)	Evanescence	Amy Lee; Ben Moody; David Hodges; Rocky Gray	Fallen	2003	
"Understanding"	Evanescence	Ben Moody	Evanescence (EP)	1998	
"Understanding"	Evanescence	Ben Moody	Sound Asleep / Whisper (Note: Two versions of "Understanding" appear on Sound Asleep / Whisper.)	1999	
"Unraveling" (Interlude)	Evanescence	Amy Lee ‡	Synthesis	2017	
"Use My Voice" †	Evanescence	Amy Lee; Tim McCord; Troy McLawhorn; Will Hunt; Jen Majura; Deena Jakoub	The Bitter Truth	2020	
"Use My Voice" †	Evanescence	Amy Lee; Tim McCord; Troy McLawhorn; Will Hunt; Jen Majura; Deena Jakoub	Evolution (Note: The demo title of "Use My Voice" on Evolution is abbreviated to "UMV".)	2021	
"Wasted on You" †	Evanescence	Amy Lee; Tim McCord; Troy McLawhorn; Will Hunt; Jen Majura	The Bitter Truth	2020	
"Wasted on You" †	Evanescence	Amy Lee; Tim McCord; Troy McLawhorn; Will Hunt; Jen Majura	Evolution (Note: The demo title of "Wasted on You" on Evolution is known as "WOY Bells".)	2021	
"Weight of the World" #	Evanescence	Amy Lee; Terry Balsamo	The Open Door	2006	
"What You Want" †	Evanescence	Amy Lee; Terry Balsamo; Tim McCord	Evanescence	2011	
"Where Will You Go?"	Evanescence	Amy Lee; Ben Moody; David Hodges	Evanescence (EP)	1998	
"Where Will You Go?"	Evanescence	Amy Lee; Ben Moody; David Hodges	Origin	2000	
"Whisper"	Evanescence	Amy Lee; Ben Moody; David Hodges	Sound Asleep / Whisper	1999	
"Whisper"	Evanescence	Amy Lee; Ben Moody; David Hodges	Origin	2000	
"Whisper"	Evanescence	Amy Lee; Ben Moody; David Hodges	Fallen	2003	
"Who Will You Follow"	Evanescence	Amy Lee; Tim McCord; Troy McLawhorn; Will Hunt; Emma Anzai; Zakk Cervini; Jordan Fish	Sanctuary	2026	
"Will Can't Catch" (Note: ”Will Can't Catch” is a demo of “Use My Voice”.)	Evanescence	Unknown	Evolution	2021	
"Without a Sound"	Evanescence	Unknown	Evolution	2021	
"Wolves"	Evanescence	Unknown	Evolution	2021	
"Writing" (Note: ”Writing” is a demo of “Wasted on You”.)	Evanescence	Unknown	Evolution	2021	
"Yeah Right" #	Evanescence	Amy Lee; Will B. Hunt	The Bitter Truth	2020	
"Yeah Right" #	Evanescence	Amy Lee; Will B. Hunt	Evolution	2021	
"Your Star"	Evanescence	Amy Lee; Terry Balsamo	The Open Door	2006	
"Your Star"	Evanescence	Amy Lee; Terry Balsamo	Synthesis	2017	

== Unreleased songs ==
Key
•	Indicates song scheduled to be released

Song	Artist(s)	Writer(s)	Originating album	Year	Ref.
"Anything for You" (Note: "Anything for You" samples "Bringin It Up" from Sonic Foundry's Futurist Drum 'N' Bass loop series.)	Evanescence	Amy Lee; Ben Moody; David Hodges	—N/a	2001/2002	
"Before the Dawn"	Evanescence	Amy Lee; Ben Moody; David Hodges	—N/a	2001/2002	
"Bleed"	Evanescence	Amy Lee; Ben Moody; David Hodges	—N/a	2001/2002	
"Forever You"	Evanescence	Amy Lee; Ben Moody; John LeCompt	—N/a	2001/2002	
"Give Unto Me"	Evanescence	Amy Lee ‡	Evanescence (EP)	1998	
"Lies"	Evanescence	Amy Lee; Ben Moody; David Hodges	—N/a	2001/2002	
"Listen to the Rain"	Evanescence	Amy Lee ‡	Origin	1999	
"October"	Evanescence	Amy Lee; Ben Moody; Will Boyd	Evanescence (EP)	1998	
"Perfect Dream" (Note: The song was recorded in the initial sessions for Evanescence with Steve Lillywhite in 2010, but were scrapped by their record label.)	Evanescence	Unknown	—N/a	2010	
"Surrender"	Evanescence	Unknown	—N/a	2001/2002	
"You Got a Lot to Learn"	Evanescence	Unknown	—N/a	2010	

== Writing credits summary ==
Writer (Note: An asterisk beside a name denotes that the writer has never been a member of Evanescence.)	Pre-Fallen (Note: Pre-Fallen includes songs from Evanescence (EP), Sounds Asleep / Whisper, Origin and Mystary.)	Fallen (2003)	The Open Door (2006)	Evanescence (2011)	Lost Whispers (2016)	Synthesis (2017)	The Bitter Truth (2021)	Unreleased	Total
Terry Balsamo	—N/a		9	13	4	5	—N/a	0	31
Will Boyd	1	0	0	—N/a	0	—N/a		1	2
Rocky Gray	—N/a	1	0	—N/a	0	—N/a		0	1
David Hodges	18	12	—N/a		3	1	—N/a	4	38
Will B. Hunt*	—N/a			5	1	3	3	0	12
Will Hunt	—N/a			6	0	3	9	0	18
Deena Jakoub*	—N/a						1	0	1
John LeCompt	—N/a	1	1	—N/a	0	—N/a		1	3
Amy Lee	24	12	13	16	12	16	12	8	113
Jen Majura	—N/a					1	4	0	5
Tim McCord	—N/a		0	12	2	3	9	0	16
Troy McLawhorn	—N/a			4	1	0	9	0	14
Ben Moody	25	12	—N/a		3	3	—N/a	6	49
Matt Outlaw*	1	—N/a			0	—N/a		0	1
Nick Raskulinecz*	—N/a			0 (Note: Nick Raskulinecz served as producer on Evanescence, but had no writing credits.)	0	—N/a	1	0	1
Zach Williams*	—N/a			1	0	1	—N/a	0	2
