= Evanescence discography =

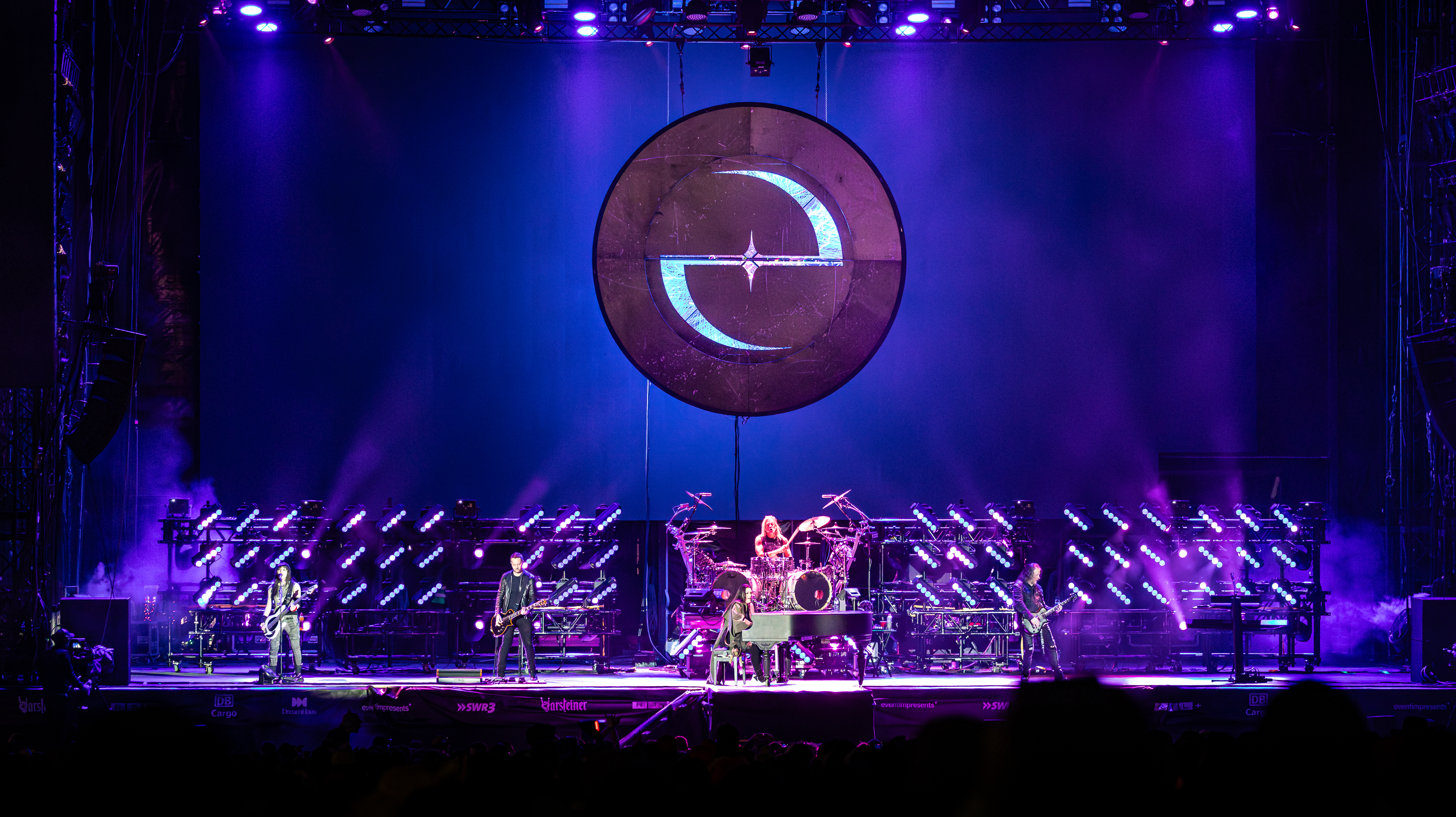
- Evanescence in 2023
- Studio albums: 6
- Extended plays: 3
- Live albums: 2
- Compilation albums: 1
- Singles: 22
- Video albums: 2
- Music videos: 23
- Demo albums: 2
- Promotional singles: 9

American rock band Evanescence has released six studio albums, two live albums, one compilation album, two demo albums, three extended plays, twenty-two singles, nine promotional singles, two video albums, and twenty three music videos. Evanescence was founded in 1994 by Amy Lee and Ben Moody in Little Rock, Arkansas. The band's lineup comprises Lee, guitarist Troy McLawhorn, guitarist Tim McCord, drummer Will Hunt, and bassist Emma Anzai. As of 2022, the band has sold over 31.9 million albums.

As a duo, Evanescence self-released the EPs Evanescence (1998) and Sound Asleep (1999), which were followed by the demo album Origin (2000). Their debut studio album, Fallen, was released in 2003, and sold 141,000 copies in its first week in the US, peaking at number three on the Billboard 200. It spawned the singles "Bring Me to Life", "Going Under", "My Immortal", and "Everybody's Fool". "Bring Me to Life" and "My Immortal" respectively were certified eleven-times platinum and platinum by the RIAA. In 2004, Evanescence won two Grammy Awards (Best New Artist and Best Hard Rock Performance). Fallen has sold over 17 million units worldwide, and was certified diamond by the RIAA in 2022. Their 2004 live album and concert DVD Anywhere but Home was certified platinum in the US and sold over one million units worldwide.

Their second album, The Open Door (2006), debuted at number one on the Billboard 200, selling over 447,000 copies in its first week in the US. Its lead single "Call Me When You're Sober" was certified platinum by the RIAA, and was followed by the singles "Lithium", "Sweet Sacrifice", and "Good Enough". "Sweet Sacrifice" received a Grammy Award nomination for Best Hard Rock Performance. The Open Door was certified double platinum by the RIAA, selling 2.1 million units in the US. It has sold six million units worldwide. Evanescence (2011), their third studio album, debuted at number one on the Billboard 200, with US sales of 127,000 copies in its first week. Three singles were released, "What You Want", "My Heart Is Broken", and "Lost in Paradise". By 2012, Evanescence had sold over 421,000 copies in the US. In 2020, the album was certified gold by the RIAA for earning over 500,000 units in the country. The band left their record label in 2014, and released the orchestral-electronica album Synthesis in 2017. In 2021, they released their fifth studio album, The Bitter Truth. Postponed by the COVID-19 pandemic, the album tracks "Wasted On You", "The Game Is Over", "Use My Voice", and "Better Without You" were released through 2020 and 2021. The Bitter Truth peaked at number 11 in the US. The band released its sixth album, Sanctuary on June 5, 2026. This Rocks called the album "the finest vocal performance of Amy Lee's career".

== Albums ==
=== Studio albums ===
List of studio albums, with selected chart positions, sales figures and certifications
Title	Details	Peak chart positions										Sales	Certifications
Title	Details	US	AUS	AUT	CAN	FRA	GER	ITA	NLD	SWI	UK	Sales	Certifications
Fallen	Released: March 4, 2003; Label: Wind-up; Formats: CD, LP, digital download	3	1	1	1	2	2	3	2	2	1	WW: 17,000,000; US: 8,000,000; UK: 1,353,676	RIAA: Diamond; ARIA: 6× Platinum; BPI: 4× Platinum; BVMI: 4× Platinum; FIMI: Platinum; IFPI AUT: Platinum; IFPI SWI: 2× Platinum; MC: 7× Platinum; NVPI: Platinum; SNEP: 2× Platinum
The Open Door	Released: October 3, 2006; Label: Wind-up; Formats: CD, LP, digital download	1	1	2	2	2	1	2	2	1	2	WW: 5,000,000; US: 2,100,000; UK: 356,803	RIAA: 2× Platinum; ARIA: 2× Platinum; BPI: Platinum; BVMI: Platinum; IFPI AUT: Gold; IFPI SWI: Platinum; MC: 2× Platinum; SNEP: Gold
Evanescence	Released: October 11, 2011; Label: Wind-up; Formats: CD, LP, digital download	1	5	4	2	8	5	5	14	4	4	US: 421,000; UK: 124,473	RIAA: Gold; ARIA: Gold; BPI: Gold; MC: Gold
Synthesis	Released: November 10, 2017; Label: BMG; Formats: CD, LP, digital download	8	6	11	16	58	5	25	23	9	23	US: 50,000	BPI: Silver
The Bitter Truth	Released: March 26, 2021; Label: BMG; Formats: CD, LP, digital download	11	3	5	14	34	2	20	15	1	4	US: 26,000	
Sanctuary	Released: June 5, 2026; Label: BMG; Formats: CD, LP, digital download	38	2	6	80	23	5	—	46	7	10	UK: 9,223	
"—" denotes a recording that did not chart or was not released in that territory.

=== Live albums ===
List of live albums, with selected chart positions, sales figures and certifications
Title	Details	Peak chart positions										Sales	Certifications
Title	Details	US	AUS	AUT	FRA	GER	GRE	ITA	NLD	NZ	SWI	Sales	Certifications
Anywhere but Home	Released: November 23, 2004; Label: Wind-up; Formats: CD, digital download	39	33	10	22	19	1	33	18	40	10	WW: 1,000,000; US: 687,000	RIAA: Gold; BPI: Silver; BVMI: Gold; IFPI GRE: Gold; IFPI SWI: Gold
Synthesis Live	Released: October 12, 2018; Label: Eagle Vision; Formats: CD, LP, digital download	—	—	—	—	51	—	—	—	—	—		
"—" denotes a recording that did not chart or was not released in that territory.

=== Compilation albums ===
Title	Details
Lost Whispers	Released: December 9, 2016; Label: Bicycle Music Company; Formats: LP, digital download

=== Demo albums ===
Title	Details
Origin	Released: November 4, 2000; Label: Bigwig Enterprises; Formats: CD, LP
Evolution	Released: March 26, 2021; Label: BMG; Formats: Cassette

=== Box sets ===
Title	Details
The Ultimate Collection	Released: February 17, 2017; Label: The Bicycle Music Company; Format: LP

== Extended plays ==
Title	Details
Evanescence	Released: 1998; Distributor: Bigwig Enterprises; Format: CD
Sound Asleep	Released: 1999; Distributor: Bigwig Enterprises; Format: CD
Mystary	Released: January 14, 2003; Label: Wind-up; Format: CD

== Singles ==
List of singles, with selected chart positions and certifications, showing year released and album name
Title	Year	Peak chart positions										Certifications	Album
Title	Year	US	AUS	AUT	CAN	GER	ITA	NLD	NZ	SWI	UK	Certifications	Album
"Bring Me to Life"	2003	5	1	3	3	2	1	10	3	6	1	RIAA: 11× Platinum; ARIA: 2× Platinum; BPI: 4× Platinum; BVMI: 3× Gold; FIMI: 2× Platinum; IFPI SWI: Gold; MC: Diamond; RMNZ: 5× Platinum	Fallen
"Going Under"	2003	— (Note: "Going Under" did not enter the Billboard Hot 100, but peaked at number 4 on the Bubbling Under Hot 100 Singles chart.)	14	14	14	15	9	16	4	13	8	ARIA: Gold; BPI: Platinum; RMNZ: Platinum	Fallen
"My Immortal"	2003	7	4	11	1	5	3	7	2	7	7	RIAA: Platinum; ARIA: Platinum; BPI: Platinum; BVMI: Gold; FIMI: Platinum; RMNZ: 2× Platinum	Fallen
"Everybody's Fool"	2004	—	23	—	—	—	16	35	—	35	24	BPI: Silver; RMNZ: Gold	Fallen
"Call Me When You're Sober"	2006	10	5	7	5	13	3	27	3	6	4	RIAA: Platinum; ARIA: Gold; BPI: Silver; RMNZ: Platinum	The Open Door
"Lithium"	2007	— (Note: "Lithium" did not enter the Billboard Hot 100, but peaked at number 24 on the Bubbling Under Hot 100 Singles chart.)	26	41	—	44	2	55	16	40	32		The Open Door
"Sweet Sacrifice"	2007	—	—	—	—	75	—	—	—	—	—		The Open Door
"Good Enough"	2007	—	—	—	—	—	—	—	—	—	—		The Open Door
"What You Want"	2011	68	86	—	55	84	86	—	—	—	72		Evanescence
"My Heart Is Broken"	2011	—	—	36	—	92	—	—	—	—	—		Evanescence
"Lost in Paradise"	2012	99	—	71	89	—	31	—	—	39	174		Evanescence
"Imperfection"	2017	—	—	—	—	—	—	—	—	—	—		Synthesis
"Hi-Lo" (featuring Lindsey Stirling)	2018	—	—	—	—	—	—	—	—	—	—		Synthesis
"The Chain"	2019	— (Note: "The Chain" did not enter the Billboard Hot 100, but peaked at number 20 on the US Digital Song Sales chart.)	—	—	—	—	—	—	—	—	— (Note: "The Chain" did not enter the UK Singles Chart, but peaked at number 53 on the UK Singles Sales Chart.)		The Bitter Truth (Japanese edition)
"Wasted on You"	2020	— (Note: "Wasted on You" did not enter the Billboard Hot 100, but peaked at number 26 on the US Digital Song Sales chart.)	—	—	— (Note: "Wasted on You" did not enter the Billboard Canadian Hot 100, but peaked at number 29 on the Canadian Digital Song Sales chart.)	—	—	—	—	—	— (Note: "Wasted on You" did not enter the UK Singles Chart, but peaked at number 42 on the UK Singles Sales Chart.)		The Bitter Truth
"The Game Is Over"	2020	— (Note: "The Game Is Over" did not enter the Billboard Hot 100, but peaked at number 11 on the US Digital Song Sales chart.)	—	—	—	—	—	—	—	—	—		The Bitter Truth
"Use My Voice"	2020	—	— (Note: "Use My Voice" did not enter the ARIA Singles Chart, but peaked at number 45 on the ARIA Digital Track Chart.)	—	—	—	—	—	—	—	— (Note: "Use My Voice" did not enter the UK Singles Chart, but peaked at number 40 on the UK Singles Sales Chart.)		The Bitter Truth
"Better Without You"	2021	—	—	—	—	—	—	—	—	—	—		The Bitter Truth
"Afterlife"	2025	—	— (Note: "Afterlife" did not enter the ARIA Singles Chart, but peaked at number 30 on the ARIA Digital Track Chart.)	—	—	—	—	—	— (Note: "Afterlife" did not enter the NZ Top 40 Singles Chart, but peaked at number 18 on the NZ Hot Singles Chart.)	—	— (Note: "Afterlife" did not enter the UK Singles Chart, but peaked at number 39 on the UK Singles Sales Chart.)		Sanctuary
"Fight Like a Girl" (featuring K.Flay)	2025	—	— (Note: "Fight Like a Girl" did not enter the ARIA Singles Chart, but peaked at number 36 on the ARIA Digital Track Chart.)	—	—	—	—	—	—	—	— (Note: "Fight Like a Girl" did not enter the UK Singles Chart, but peaked at number 67 on the UK Singles Sales Chart.)		Sanctuary (Japanese edition)
"Who Will You Follow"	2026	— (Note: "Who Will You Follow" did not enter the Billboard Hot 100, but peaked at number 22 on the US Digital Song Sales chart.)	— (Note: "Who Will You Follow" did not enter the ARIA Singles Chart, but peaked at number 21 on the ARIA Digital Track Chart.)	—	—	—	—	—	— (Note: "Who Will You Follow" did not enter the NZ Top 40 Singles Chart, but peaked at number 30 on the NZ Hot Singles Chart.)	—	— (Note: "Who Will You Follow" did not enter the UK Singles Chart, but peaked at number 39 on the UK Singles Sales Chart.)		Sanctuary
"Tell Me When You've Had Enough"	2026	—	—	—	—	—	—	—	— (Note: "Tell Me When You've Had Enough" did not enter the NZ Top 40 Singles Chart, but peaked at number 20 on the NZ Hot Singles Chart.)	—	—		Sanctuary
"—" denotes a recording that did not chart or was not released in that territory.

== Promotional singles ==
List of promotional singles, with selected chart positions, showing year released and album name
Title	Year	Peak chart positions					Album
Title	Year	US Bub.	US Main.	US Rock	CAN	POL	Album
"Imaginary"	2004	—	—	—	—	—	Fallen
"Missing"	2004	—	—	—	—	22	Anywhere but Home
"Weight of the World"	2007	—	—	—	—	—	The Open Door
"Together Again"	2010	3	—	— (Note: "Together Again" did not enter the Hot Rock & Alternative Songs chart, but peaked at number 11 on the Rock Digital Song Sales chart.)	86	—	Non-album single
"Made of Stone"	2012	—	39	— (Note: "Made of Stone" did not enter the Hot Rock & Alternative Songs chart, but peaked at number 36 on the Active Rock chart.)	—	—	Evanescence
"The Other Side"	2012	—	36	— (Note: "The Other Side" did not enter the Hot Rock & Alternative Songs chart, but peaked at number 32 on the Active Rock chart.)	—	—	Evanescence
"Bring Me to Life (Synthesis)"	2017	—	—	31	—	—	Synthesis
"Lacrymosa (Synthesis)"	2017	—	—	—	—	—	Synthesis
"Yeah Right"	2020	—	— (Note: "Yeah Right" did not enter the Mainstream Rock chart, but peaked at number 10 on the Hard Rock Digital Song Sales chart.)	— (Note: "Yeah Right" did not enter the Hot Rock & Alternative Songs chart, but peaked at number 22 on the Alternative Digital Song Sales chart.)	—	—	The Bitter Truth
"—" denotes a recording that did not chart or was not released in that territory.

== Other charting songs ==
List of other songs, with selected chart positions, showing year released and album name
Title	Year	Peak chart positions			Album
Title	Year	US Alt. DL	US Hard Rock	NZ Hot	Album
"My Immortal (Synthesis)"	2017	19	—	—	Synthesis
"Beautiful Lie"	2026	—	17	25	Sanctuary
"Tell Me When You've Had Enough"	2026	—	4	20	Sanctuary
"Sanctuary"	2026	—	—	30	Sanctuary
"How Do I Heal"	2026	—	—	38	Sanctuary

== Videos ==
=== Video albums ===
List of video albums, with selected chart positions and certifications
Title	Details	Peak chart positions										Certifications
Title	Details	US	AUS	AUT	BEL (FL)	BEL (WA)	GER	NLD	SWE	SWI	UK	Certifications
Anywhere but Home	Released: November 23, 2004; Label: Wind-up; Formats: DVD	3	4	—	—	—	—	8	—	—	4	RIAA: 5× Platinum; ARIA: 2× Platinum; BPI: Platinum; BVMI: 3× Gold
Synthesis Live	Released: October 12, 2018; Label: Eagle Vision; Formats: DVD, Blu-ray	1	—	4	2	1	7	3	2	1	1	
"—" denotes a recording that did not chart or was not released in that territory.

=== Music videos ===
List of music videos, showing year released and directors
Title	Year	Director(s)	Ref.
"Bring Me to Life"	2003	Philipp Stölzl	
"Going Under"	2003	Philipp Stölzl	
"My Immortal"	2003	David Mouldy	
"Everybody's Fool"	2004	Philipp Stölzl	
"Call Me When You're Sober"	2006	Marc Webb	
"Lithium"	2006	Paul Fedor	
"Sweet Sacrifice"	2007	P. R. Brown	
"Good Enough"	2007	Marc Webb and Rich Lee	
"What You Want"	2011	Meiert Avis	
"My Heart Is Broken"	2012	Dean Karr	
"Lost in Paradise"	2013	Blake Judd	
"Imperfection"	2017	P. R. Brown	
"Hi-Lo"	2018	P. R. Brown	
"The Chain"	2020	P. R. Brown	
"Wasted on You"	2020	P. R. Brown	
"The Game Is Over"	2020	P. R. Brown	
"Use My Voice"	2020	Eric D. Howell	
"Better Without You"	2021	Eric D. Howell	
"Yeah Right"	2023	Eric Ritcher	
"Afterlife"	2025	Jason Lester	
"Fight Like a Girl"	2025	Chad Stahelski	
"Who Will You Follow"	2026	Jensen Noen	
"Tell Me When You've Had Enough"	2026	Eric Ritcher	
