= Better Without You =

Better Without You may refer to:

- "Better Without You", a song by Kelly Rowland from the album Ms. Kelly, 2007
- "Better Without You", a song by Olly Murs from the album 24 Hrs, 2016
- "Better Without You", a song by Evanescence from their album The Bitter Truth, 2021
