= Evanescence (disambiguation) =

Evanescence is an American rock band.

Evanescence may also refer to:

- an abstract noun expressing the notion of ephemerality
- Evanescence (Evanescence album), 2011
- Evanescence, a 1998 EP by Evanescence
- Evanescence (Maria Schneider album), 1994
- Evanescence (Scorn album), 1994
- Evanesce (album), by Anatomy of a Ghost, 2003
- Evanescent field

== See also ==
- Evanescent (disambiguation)
