= Evanescent =

Evanescent may refer to:

- Evanescent (dermatology), a class of skin lesions
- "Evanescent" (song), a song by Vamps
- Evanescent wave, a term applied to electromagnetic waves that decay exponentially

== See also ==
- Evanescence (disambiguation)
