= MTV Video Music Award for Best Rock Video =

Annual music video award

MTV Video Music Award for Best Rock
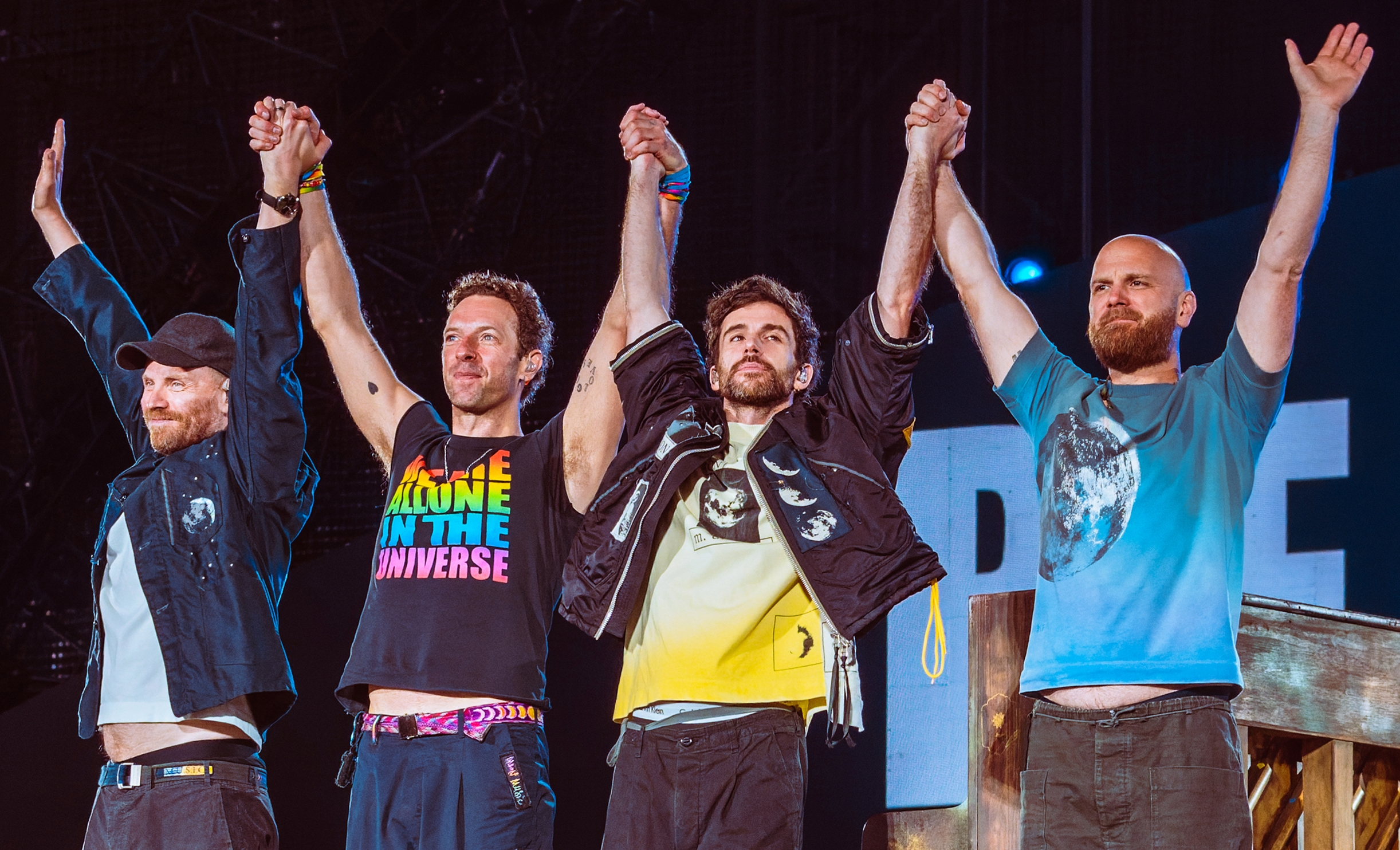
- Coldplay is the most recent recipient for "All My Love"
- Awarded for: rock music videos
- Country: United States
- Presented by: MTV
- First award: 1989
- Final award: 2025
- Currently held by: Coldplay — "All My Love" (2025)

Highlights
- Most awards: Aerosmith (4)
- Most nominations: Foo Fighters & Linkin Park (10)
- Website: VMA website

The MTV Video Music Award for Best Rock was first given out in 1989, one of the four original genre categories added to the VMAs that year. In its first year, the award was called Best Heavy Metal Video, and from 1990 to 1995, it was renamed Best Metal/Hard Rock Video. The category underwent a third, brief name change in 1996, when it was renamed Best Hard Rock Video. In 1997, the award acquired its most enduring name, Best Rock Video, which it retained until 2016. The following year, the word "Video" was removed from all genre categories at the VMAs (despite nominations still going to specific videos), giving this award its current name: Best Rock.

Like all other genre categories at the VMAs, this category was retired briefly in 2007, when the VMAs were revamped and most original categories were eliminated. In 2008, though, MTV brought back this award, along with several of the others that had been retired in 2007.

Aerosmith is the most frequent winner of this award, with a total of four wins between 1990 and 1998. The Foo Fighters and Linkin Park are the most nominated acts in this category, having received ten nominations each. Closely following them is Fall Out Boy, with nine nominations. In 1995, White Zombie's bassist Sean Yseult became the first woman to win this award, while in 2014, New Zealand singer Lorde became the first female solo act to win this male-dominated category.

== Recipients ==
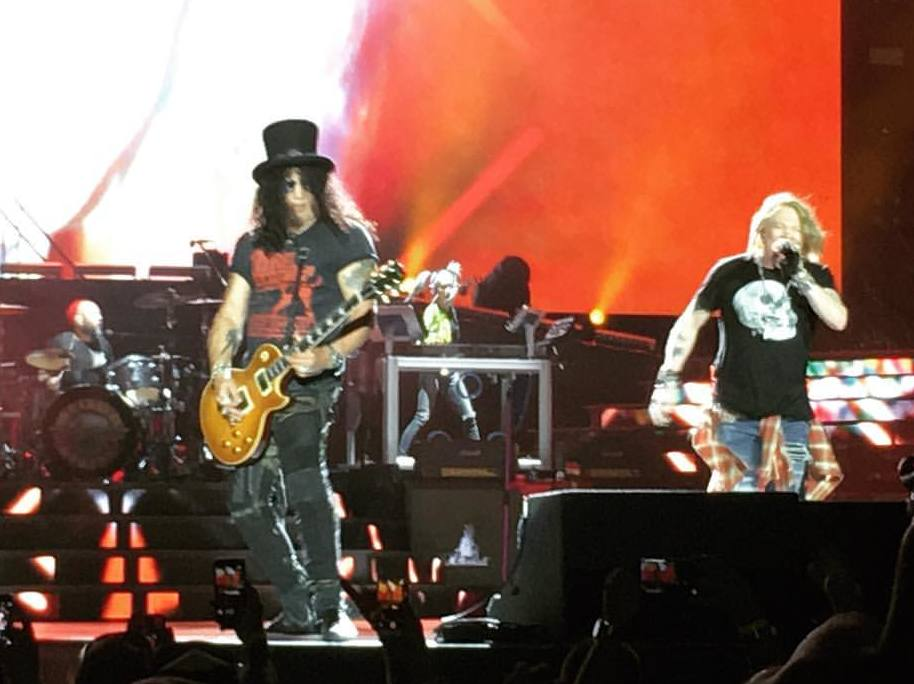
Inaugural winner Guns N' Roses

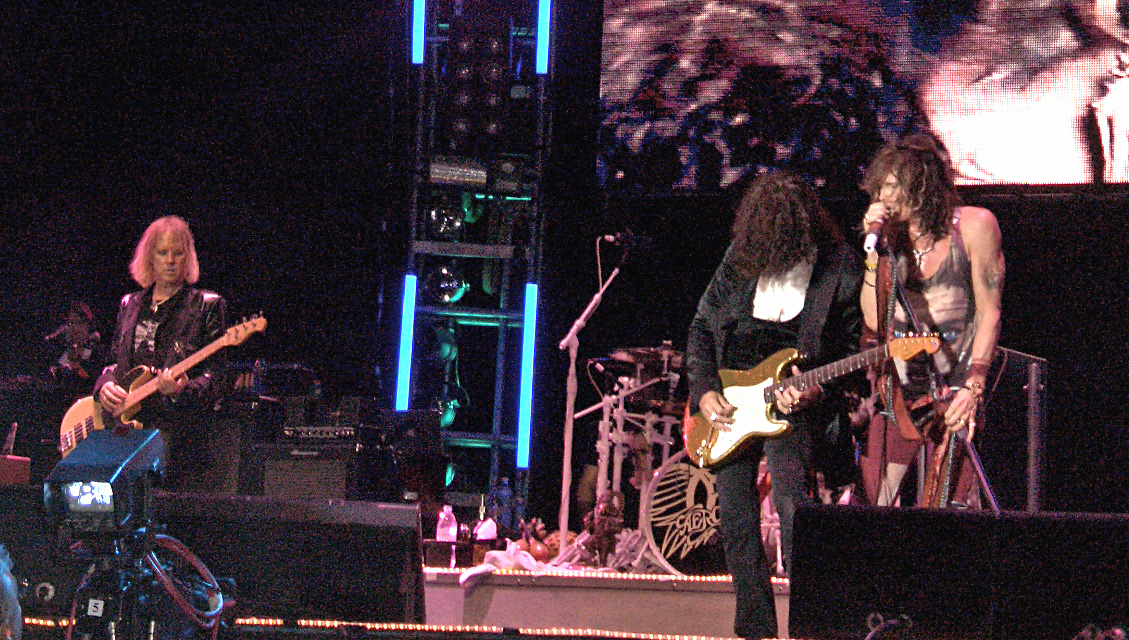
Aerosmith won the award four times

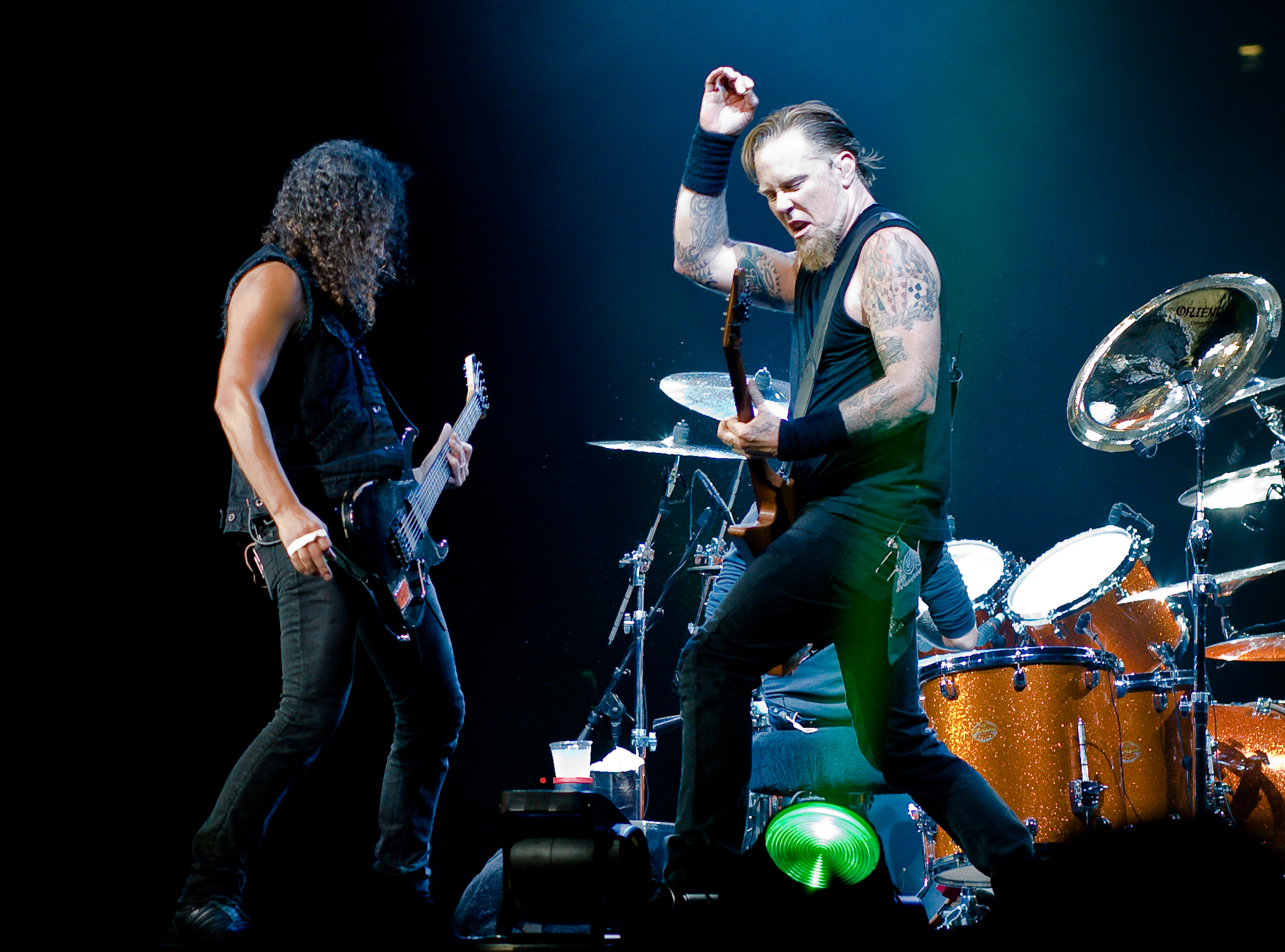
Metallica won the award twice

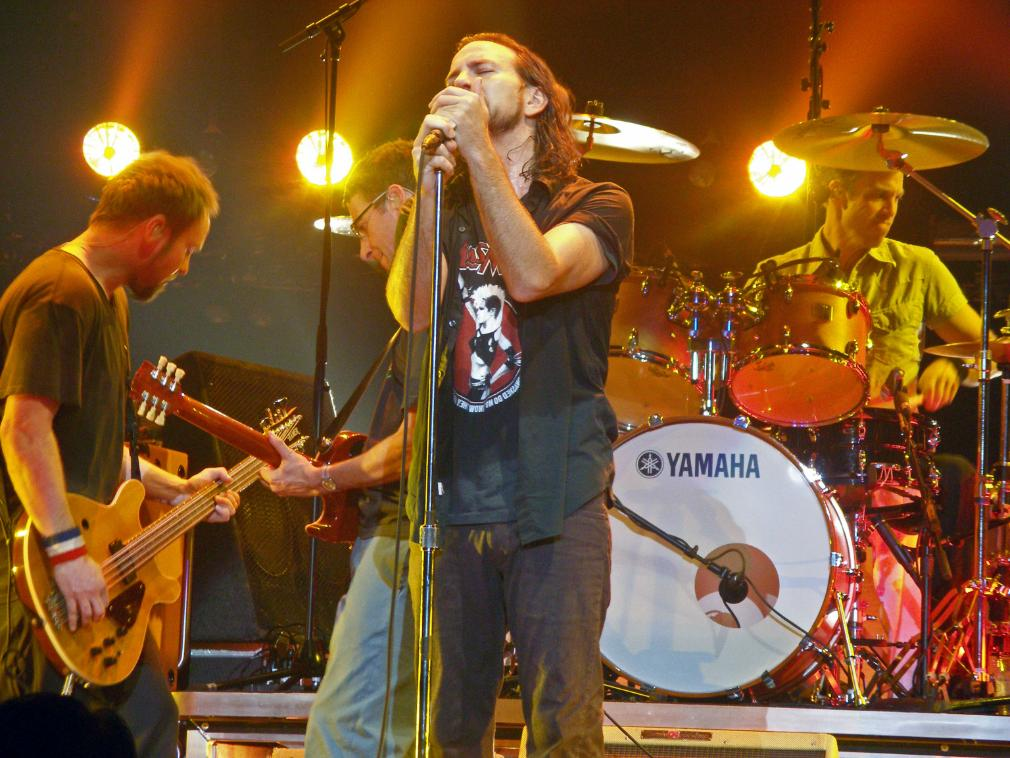
1993 winner Pearl Jam

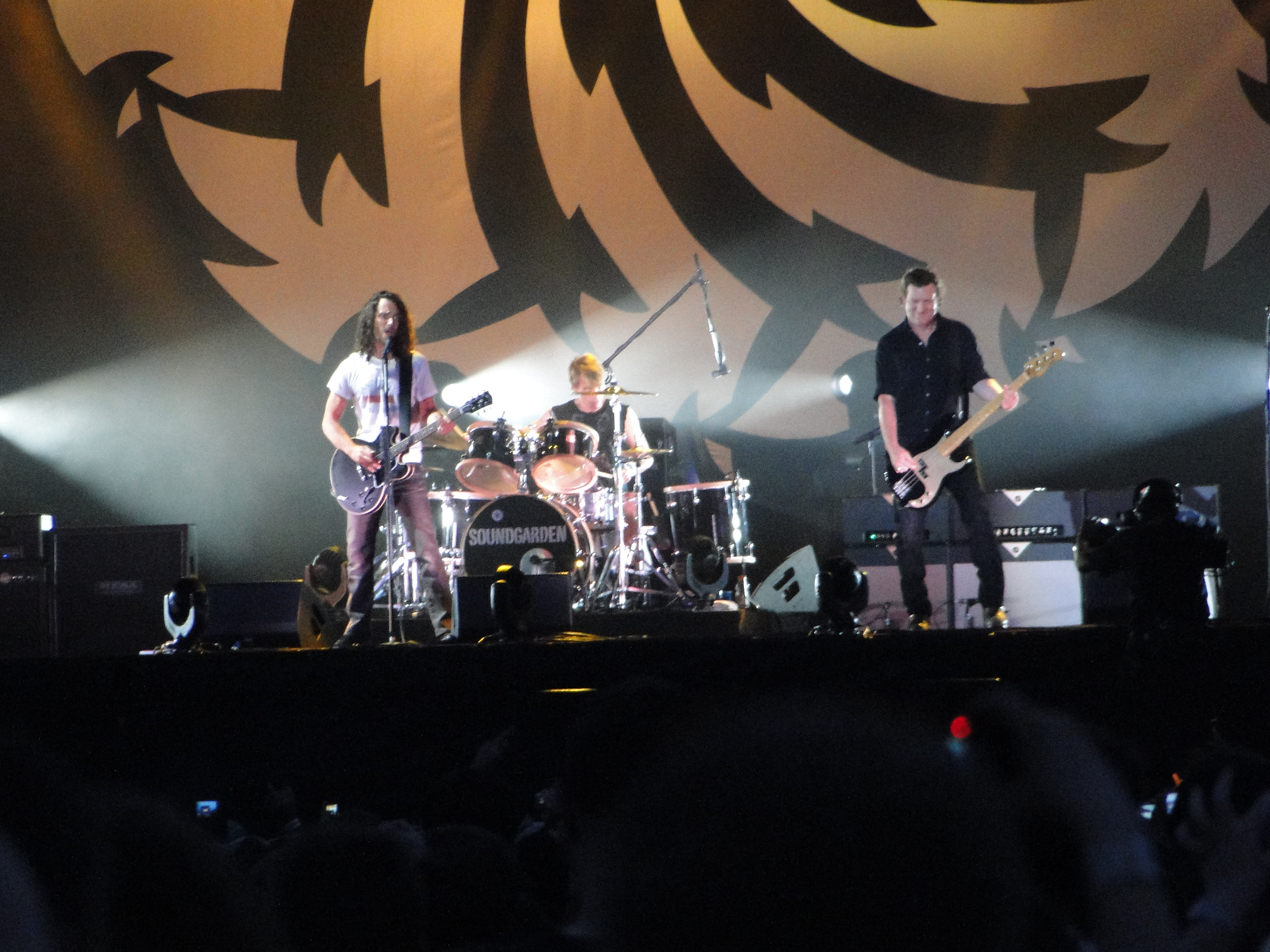
1994 winner Soundgarden

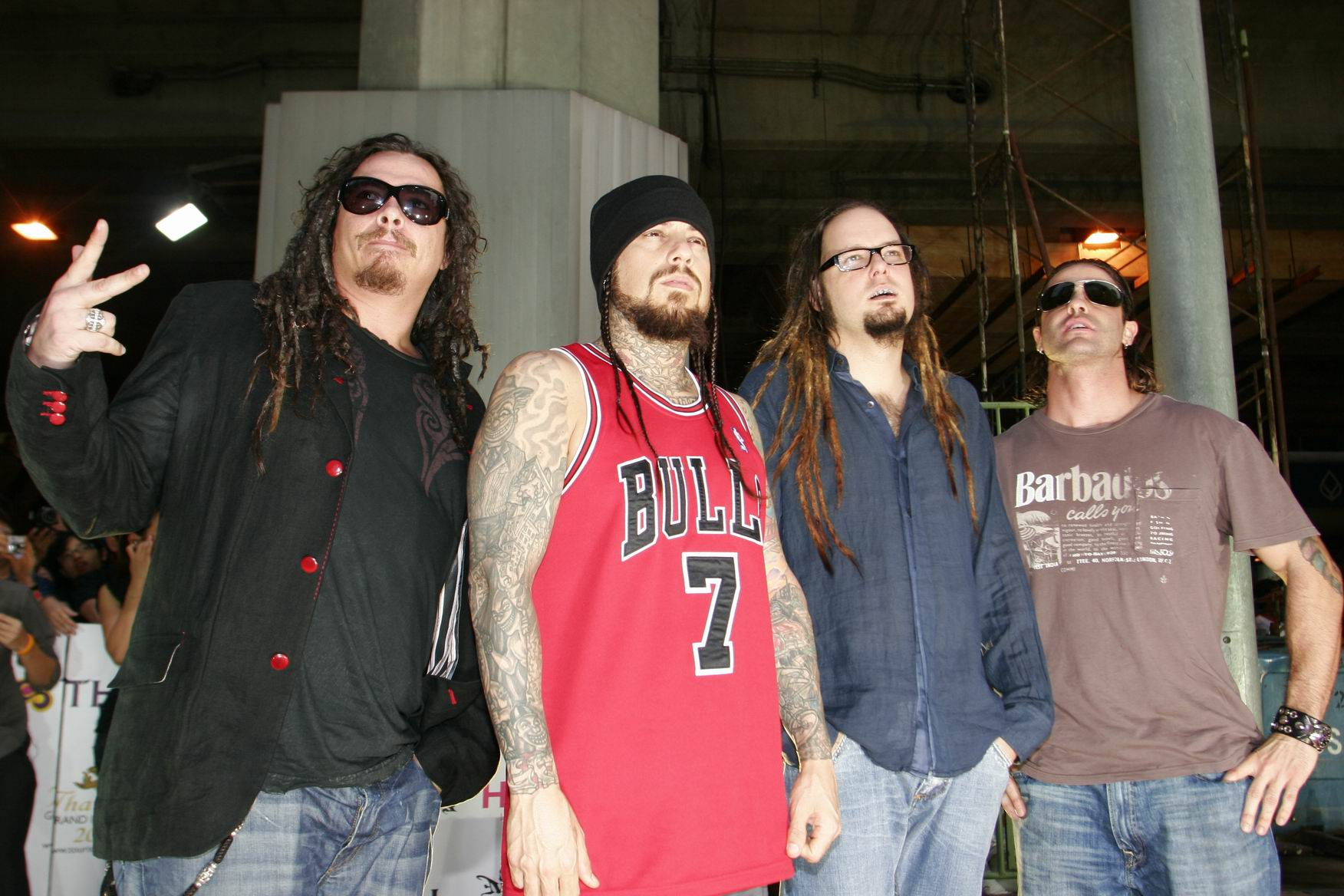
1999 winner Korn

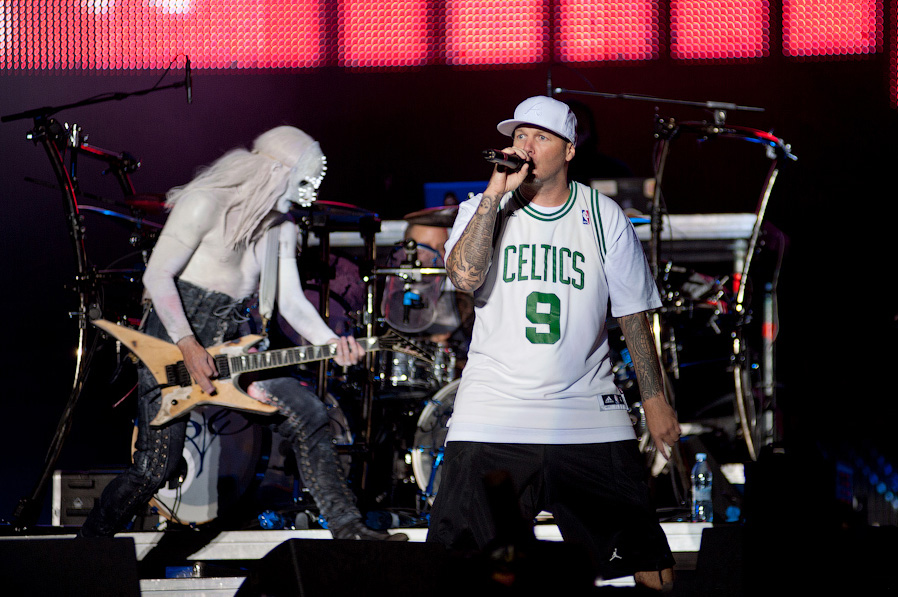
Limp Bizkit won the award twice

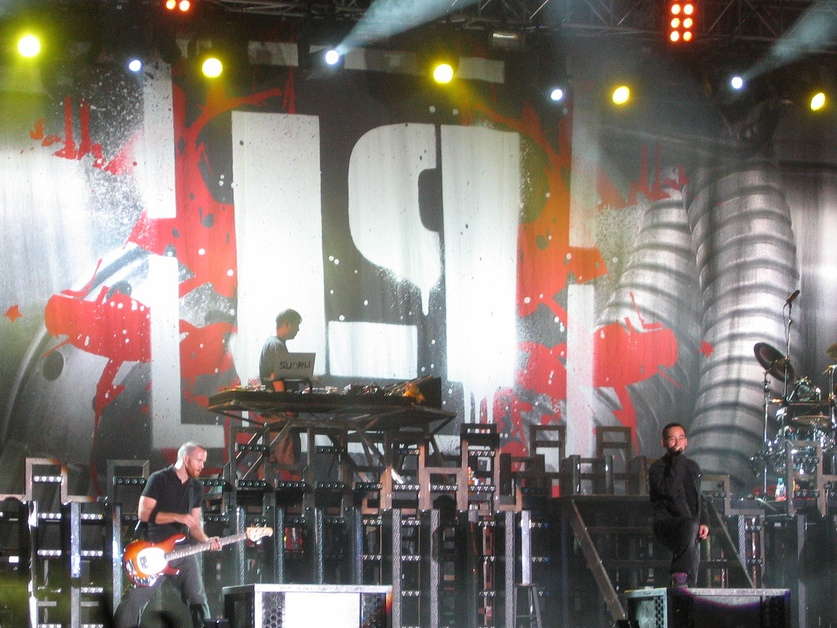
Three-time winner Linkin Park is one of three acts to have won the award for two consecutive years.

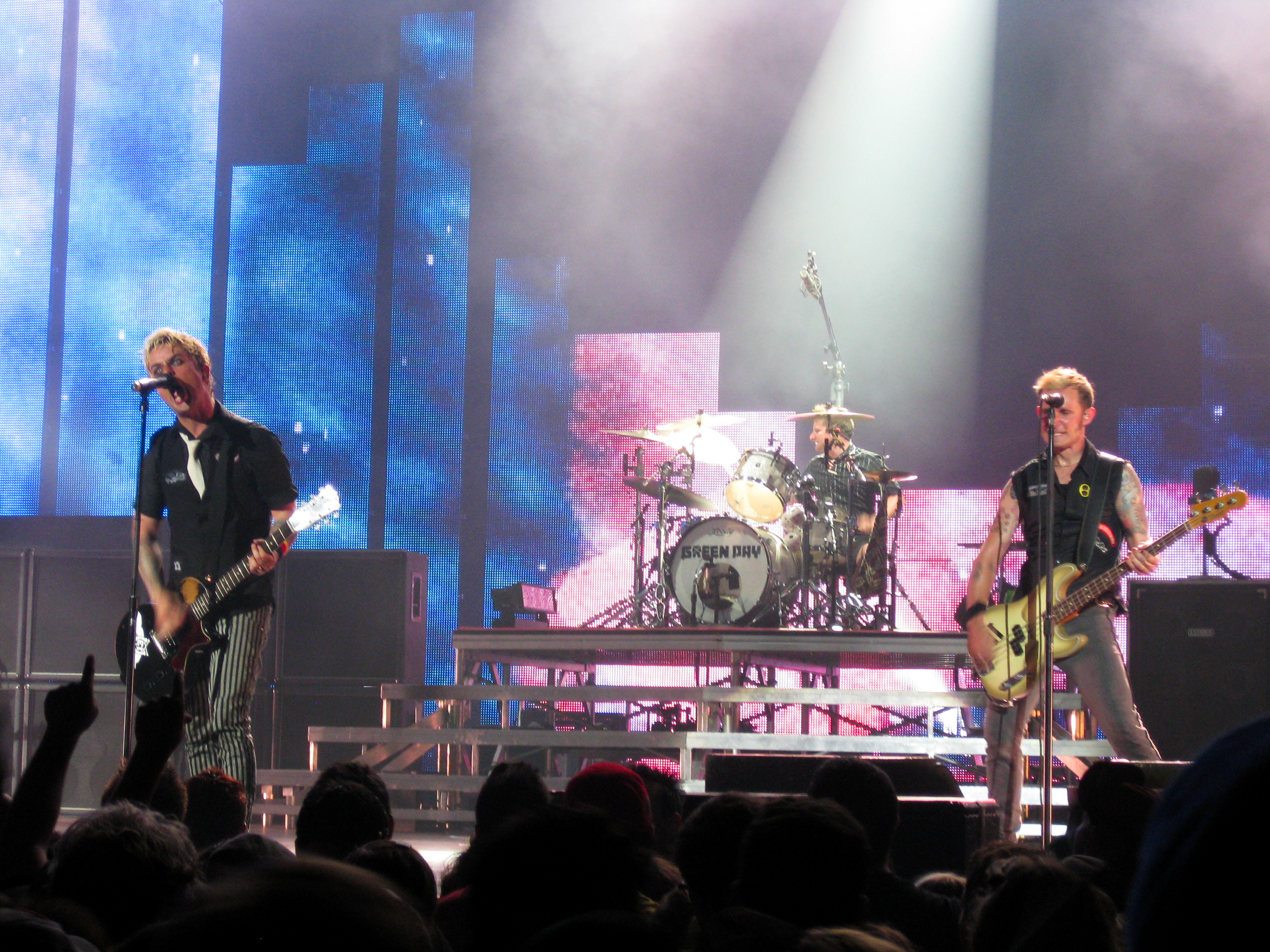
Green Day has won the award twice for their music videos "Boulevard of Broken Dreams" and "21 Guns"

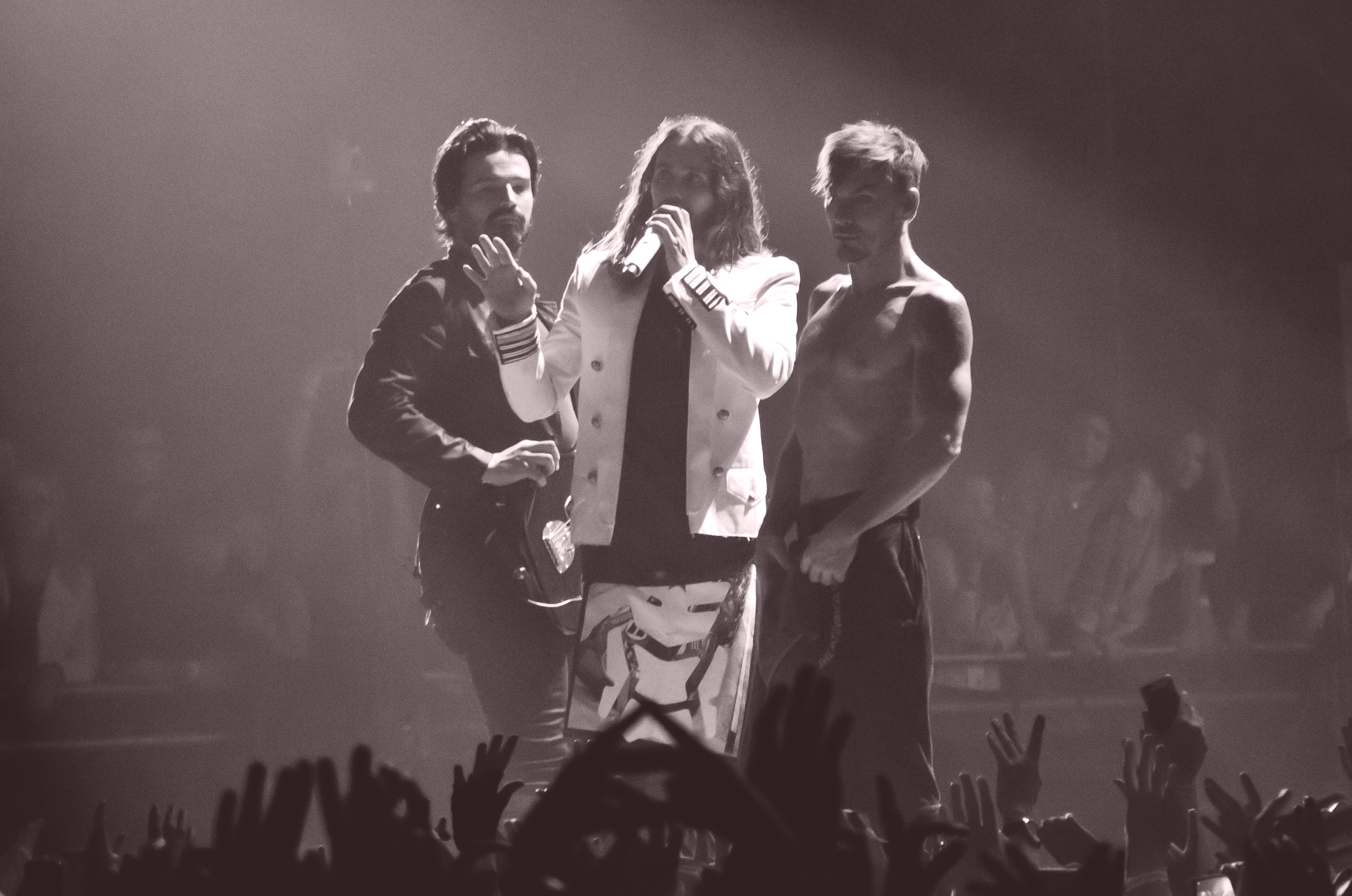
Thirty Seconds to Mars won the award twice

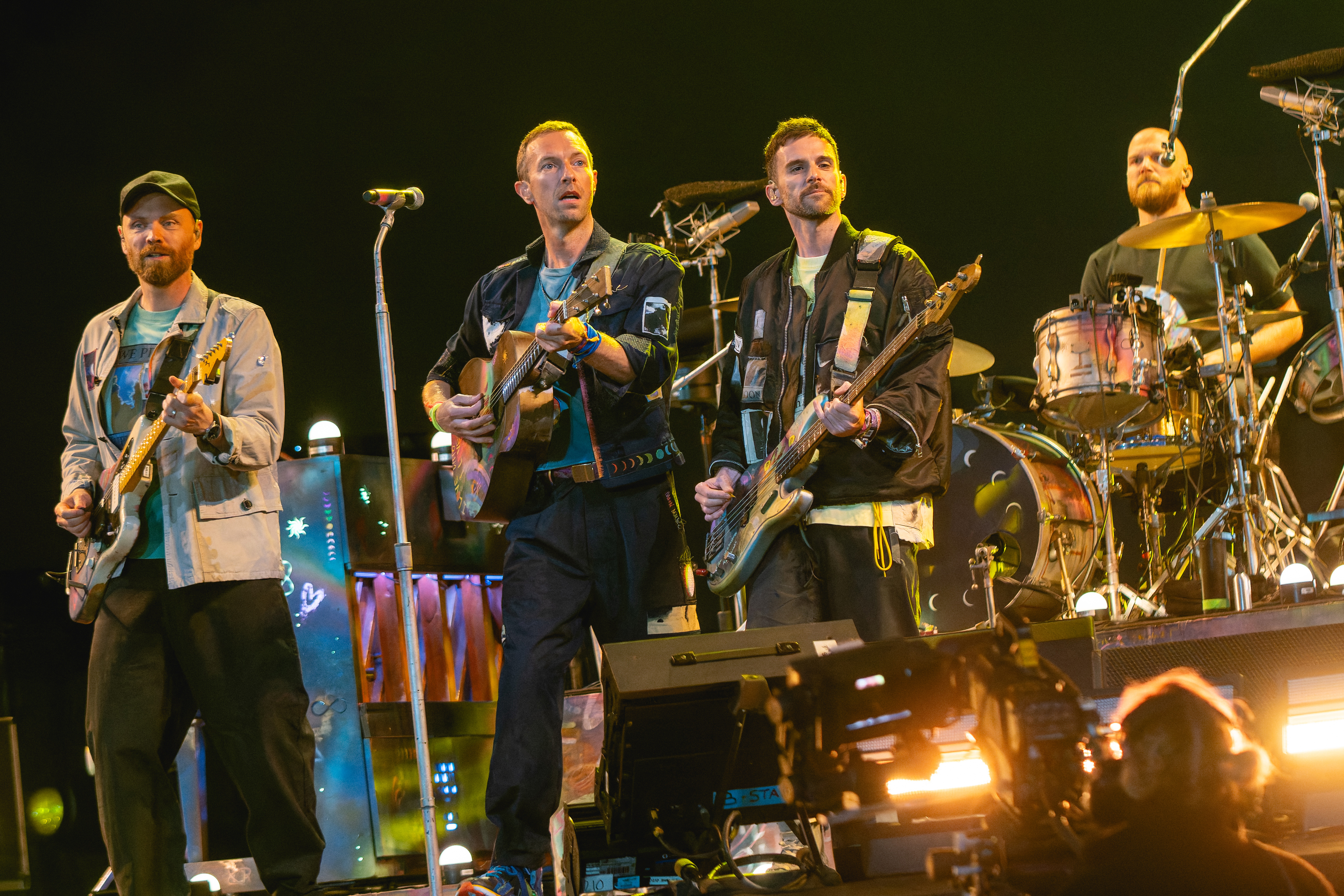
Three-time winner Coldplay

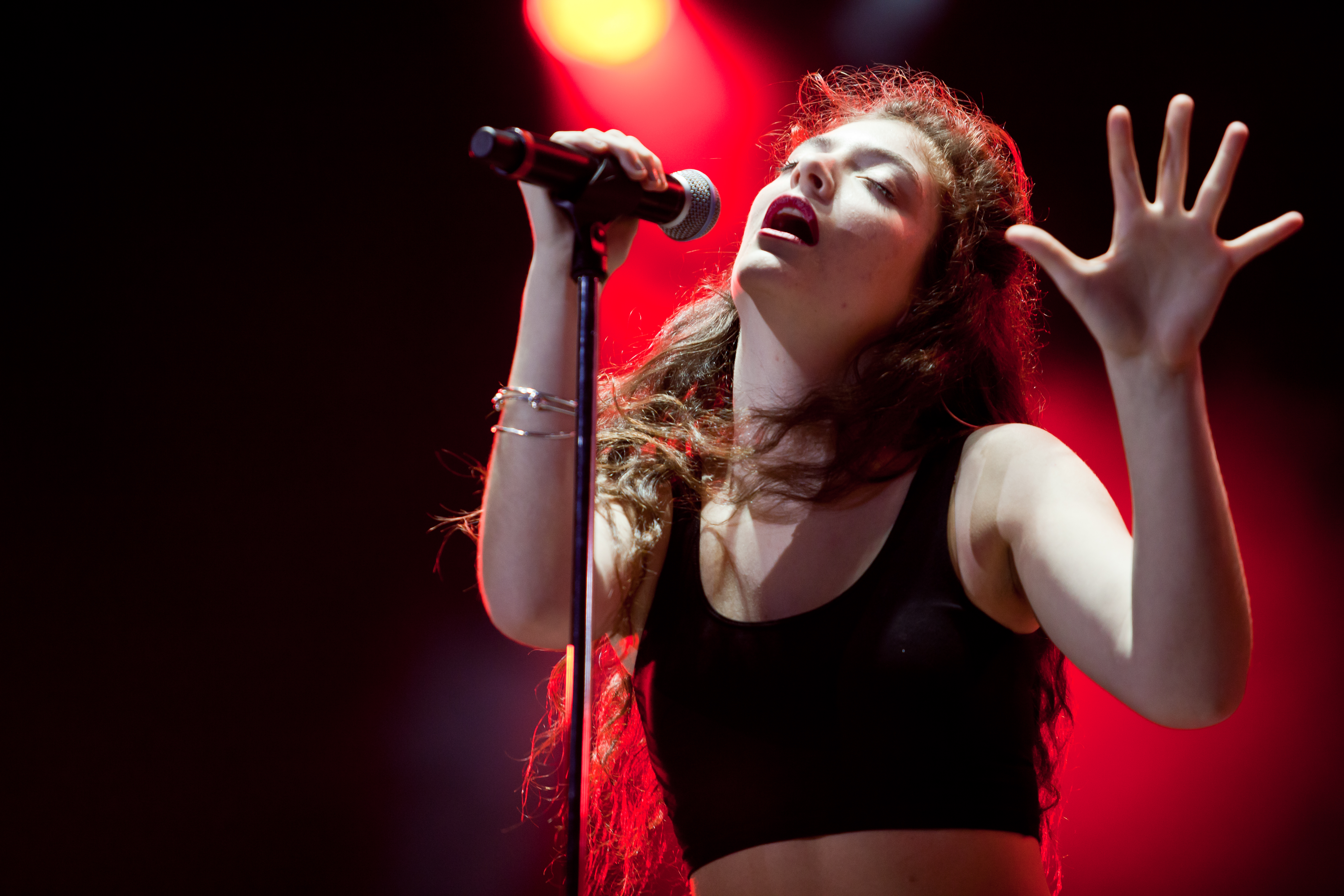
Lorde is the first female singer to win this award

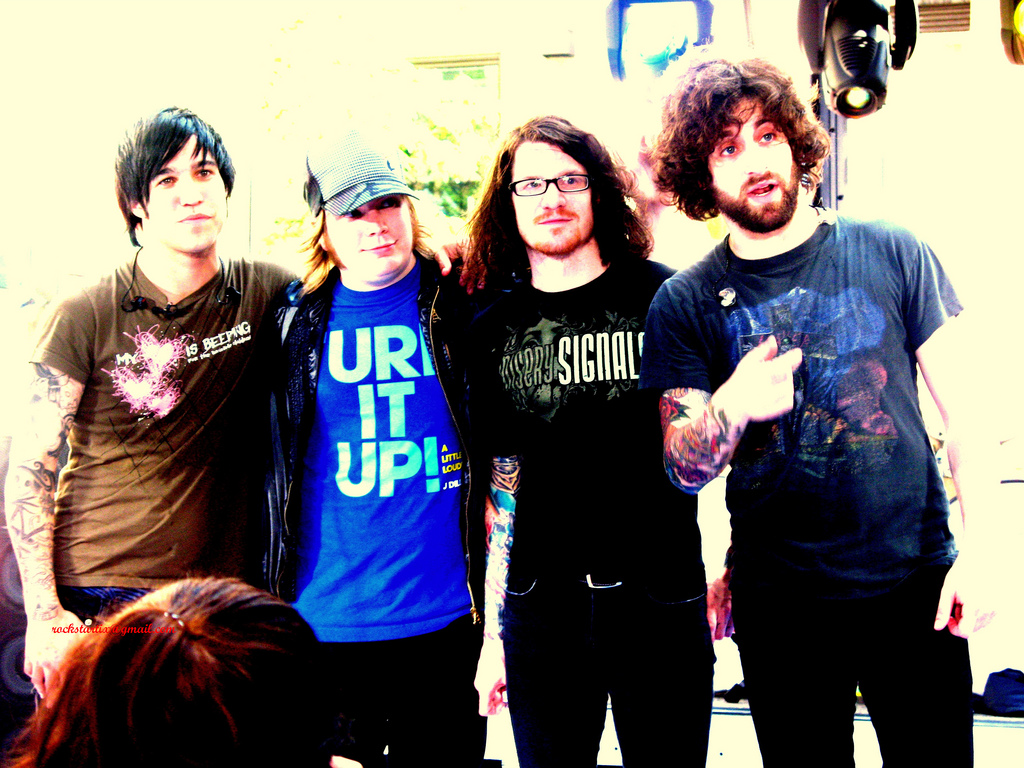
2015 winner Fall Out Boy

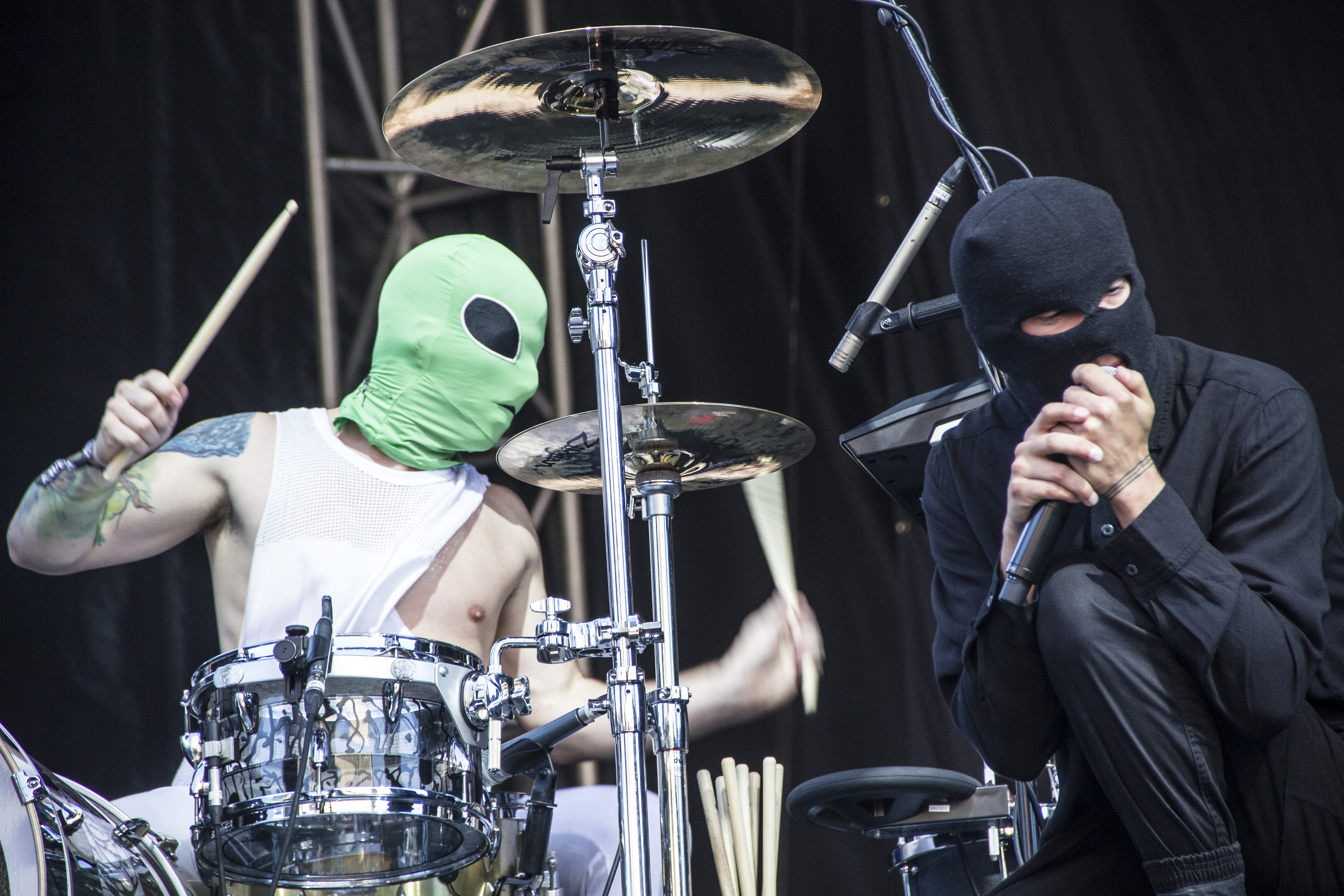
Two-time winner Twenty One Pilots

=== 1980s ===
Recipients
Year (Note: Each year is linked to the article about the MTV Video Music Awards held that year.)	Winner(s)	Video	Nominees	Ref.
1989	Guns N' Roses	"Sweet Child o' Mine"	Aerosmith — "Rag Doll"; Def Leppard — "Pour Some Sugar on Me"; Metallica — "One"	

=== 1990s ===
Recipients
Year	Winner(s)	Video	Nominees	Ref.
1990	Aerosmith	"Janie's Got a Gun"	Faith No More — "Epic"; Mötley Crüe — "Kickstart My Heart"; Slaughter — "Up All Night"	
1991	Aerosmith	"The Other Side"	AC/DC — "Thunderstruck"; Alice in Chains — "Man in the Box"; The Black Crowes — "She Talks to Angels"; Faith No More — "Falling to Pieces"; Guns N' Roses — "You Could Be Mine"; Queensrÿche — "Silent Lucidity"; Warrant — "Uncle Tom's Cabin"	
1992	Metallica	"Enter Sandman"	Def Leppard — "Let's Get Rocked"; Ugly Kid Joe — "Everything About You"; Van Halen — "Right Now"	
1993	Pearl Jam	"Jeremy"	Aerosmith — "Livin' on the Edge"; Helmet — "Unsung"; Nine Inch Nails — "Wish"	
1994	Soundgarden	"Black Hole Sun"	Aerosmith — "Cryin'"; Anthrax — "Black Lodge"; Rollins Band — "Liar"	
1995	White Zombie	"More Human than Human"	Green Day — "Basket Case"; Meat Puppets — "We Don't Exist"; Stone Temple Pilots — "Interstate Love Song"	
1996	Metallica	"Until It Sleeps"	Alice in Chains — "Again"; Marilyn Manson — "Sweet Dreams"; Rage Against the Machine — "Bulls on Parade"	
1997	Aerosmith	"Falling in Love (Is Hard on the Knees)"	Foo Fighters — "Monkey Wrench"; Marilyn Manson — "The Beautiful People"; Dave Matthews Band — "Crash into Me"; Rage Against the Machine — "People of the Sun"	
1998	Aerosmith	"Pink"	Foo Fighters — "Everlong"; Dave Matthews Band — "Don't Drink the Water"; Metallica — "The Unforgiven II"	
1999	Korn	"Freak on a Leash"	Kid Rock — "Bawitdaba"; Lenny Kravitz — "Fly Away"; Limp Bizkit — "Nookie"; The Offspring — "Pretty Fly (For a White Guy)"	

=== 2000s ===
Recipients
Year	Winner(s)	Video	Nominees	Ref.
2000	Limp Bizkit	"Break Stuff"	Creed — "Higher"; Kid Rock — "Cowboy"; Korn — "Falling Away from Me"; Metallica — "I Disappear"; Rage Against the Machine — "Sleep Now in the Fire"	
2001	Limp Bizkit	"Rollin' (Air Raid Vehicle)"	Aerosmith — "Jaded"; Linkin Park — "Crawling"; Staind — "It's Been Awhile"; Weezer — "Hash Pipe"	
2002	Linkin Park	"In the End"	Creed — "My Sacrifice"; Jimmy Eat World — "The Middle"; Korn — "Here to Stay"; P.O.D. — "Youth of the Nation"; System of a Down — "Chop Suey!"	
2003	Linkin Park	"Somewhere I Belong"	Evanescence (featuring Paul McCoy) — "Bring Me to Life"; Good Charlotte — "Lifestyles of the Rich and Famous"; Metallica — "St. Anger"; The White Stripes — "Seven Nation Army"	
2004	Jet	"Are You Gonna Be My Girl"	The Darkness — "I Believe in a Thing Called Love"; Evanescence — "My Immortal"; Hoobastank — "The Reason"; Linkin Park — "Breaking the Habit"	
2005	Green Day	"Boulevard of Broken Dreams"	Foo Fighters — "Best of You"; The Killers — "Mr. Brightside"; My Chemical Romance — "Helena"; Weezer — "Beverly Hills"	
2006	AFI	"Miss Murder"	Green Day — "Wake Me Up When September Ends"; Panic! at the Disco — "I Write Sins Not Tragedies"; Red Hot Chili Peppers — "Dani California"; Thirty Seconds to Mars — "The Kill"	
2007	—N/a			
2008	Linkin Park	"Shadow of the Day"	Fall Out Boy (featuring John Mayer) — "Beat It"; Foo Fighters — "The Pretender"; Paramore — "Crushcrushcrush"; Slipknot — "Psychosocial"	
2009	Green Day	"21 Guns"	Coldplay — "Viva la Vida"; Fall Out Boy — "I Don't Care"; Kings of Leon — "Use Somebody"; Paramore — "Decode"	

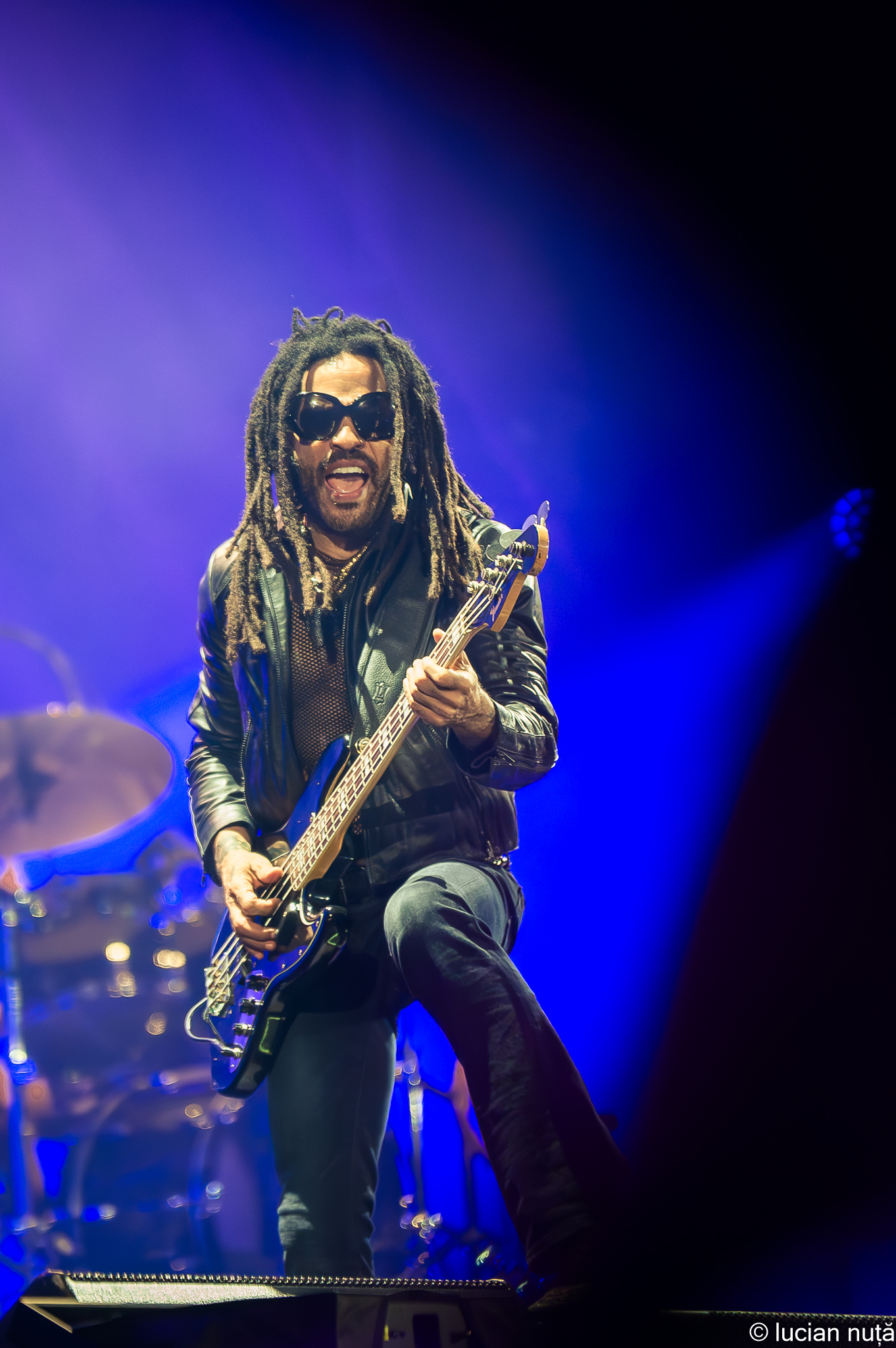
2024 winner Lenny Kravitz

=== 2010s ===
Recipients
Year	Winner(s)	Video	Nominees	Ref.
2010	Thirty Seconds to Mars	"Kings and Queens"	Florence + the Machine — "Dog Days Are Over"; MGMT — "Flash Delirium"; Muse — "Uprising"; Paramore — "Ignorance"	
2011	Foo Fighters	"Walk"	The Black Keys — "Howlin' for You"; Cage the Elephant — "Shake Me Down"; Foster the People — "Pumped Up Kicks"; Mumford & Sons — "The Cave"	
2012	Coldplay	"Paradise"	The Black Keys — "Lonely Boy"; Imagine Dragons — "It's Time"; Linkin Park — "Burn It Down"; Jack White — "Sixteen Saltines"	
2013	Thirty Seconds to Mars	"Up in the Air"	Fall Out Boy — "My Songs Know What You Did in the Dark (Light Em Up)"; Imagine Dragons — "Radioactive"; Mumford & Sons — "I Will Wait"; Vampire Weekend — "Diane Young"	
2014	Lorde	"Royals"	Arctic Monkeys — "Do I Wanna Know?"; The Black Keys — "Fever"; Imagine Dragons — "Demons"; Linkin Park — "Until It's Gone"	
2015	Fall Out Boy	"Uma Thurman"	Arctic Monkeys — "Why'd You Only Call Me When You're High?"; Florence + the Machine — "Ship to Wreck"; Hozier — "Take Me to Church"; Walk the Moon — "Shut Up and Dance"	
2016	Twenty One Pilots	"Heathens"	All Time Low — "Missing You"; Coldplay — "Adventure of a Lifetime"; Fall Out Boy (featuring Demi Lovato) — "Irresistible"; Panic! at the Disco — "Victorious"	
2017	Twenty One Pilots	"Heavydirtysoul"	Coldplay — "A Head Full of Dreams"; Fall Out Boy — "Young and Menace"; Foo Fighters — "Run"; Green Day — "Bang Bang"	
2018	Imagine Dragons	"Whatever It Takes"	Fall Out Boy — "Champion"; Foo Fighters — "The Sky Is a Neighborhood"; Linkin Park — "One More Light"; Panic! at the Disco — "Say Amen (Saturday Night)"; Thirty Seconds to Mars — "Walk on Water"	
2019	Panic! at the Disco	"High Hopes"	The 1975 — "Love It If We Made It"; Fall Out Boy — "Bishops Knife Trick"; Imagine Dragons — "Natural"; Lenny Kravitz — "Low"; Twenty One Pilots — "My Blood"	

=== 2020s ===
Recipients
Year	Winner(s)	Video	Nominees	Ref.
2020	Coldplay	"Orphans"	blink-182 — "Happy Days"; Evanescence — "Wasted on You"; Fall Out Boy (featuring Wyclef Jean) — "Dear Future Self (Hands Up)"; Green Day — "Oh Yeah!"; The Killers — "Caution"	
2021	John Mayer	"Last Train Home"	Evanescence — "Use My Voice"; Foo Fighters — "Shame Shame"; The Killers — "My Own Soul's Warning"; Kings of Leon — "The Bandit"; Lenny Kravitz — "Raise Vibration"	
2022	Red Hot Chili Peppers	"Black Summer"	Foo Fighters — "Love Dies Young"; Muse — "Won't Stand Down"; Shinedown — "Planet Zero"; Three Days Grace — "So Called Life"; Jack White — "Taking Me Back"	
2023	Måneskin	"The Loneliest"	Foo Fighters – "The Teacher"; Linkin Park – "Lost"; Metallica – "Lux Æterna"; Muse – "You Make Me Feel Like It's Halloween"; Red Hot Chili Peppers – "Tippa My Tongue"	
2024	Lenny Kravitz	"Human"	Bon Jovi – "Legendary"; Coldplay – "Feelslikeimfallinginlove"; Green Day – "Dilemma"; Kings of Leon – "Mustang"; U2 – "Atomic City"	
2025	Coldplay	"All My Love"	Evanescence – "Afterlife" (From the Netflix Series Devil May Cry)"; Green Day – "One Eyed Bastard"; Lenny Kravitz – "Honey"; Linkin Park – "The Emptiness Machine"; Twenty One Pilots – "The Contract"	
2026	—N/a			

== Statistics ==
=== Multiple wins ===
4 wins

- Aerosmith

3 wins

- Coldplay
- Linkin Park

2 wins

- Metallica
- Green Day
- Limp Bizkit
- Thirty Seconds to Mars
- Twenty One Pilots

=== Multiple nominations ===
10 nominations

- Foo Fighters
- Linkin Park

9 nominations

- Fall Out Boy

8 nominations

- Aerosmith
- Green Day

7 nominations

- Coldplay
- Metallica

5 nominations

- Evanescence
- Imagine Dragons
- Lenny Kravitz

4 nominations

- Panic! at the Disco
- Thirty Seconds to Mars
- Twenty One Pilots

3 nominations

- Rage Against the Machine
- Limp Bizkit
- Korn
- Paramore
- Muse
- Red Hot Chili Peppers
- Kings of Leon
- The Black Keys
- The Killers

2 nominations

- Guns N' Roses
- Def Leppard
- Faith No More
- Alice in Chains
- Marilyn Manson
- Creed
- Kid Rock
- Weezer
- Mumford & Sons
- Arctic Monkeys
- Florence + the Machine
- Jack White
- John Mayer (Note: 1 as a featured artist.)

== See also ==
- MTV Europe Music Award for Best Rock
