= Use My Voice =

2020 single by Evanescence

Single by Evanescence

from the album The Bitter Truth
- Released: August 14, 2020
- Recorded: 2020
- Genre: Alternative metal
- Length: 4:02
- Label: BMG
- Songwriters: Evanescence; Deena Jakoub
- Producer: Nick Raskulinecz

Evanescence singles chronology
"The Game Is Over" (2020)	"Use My Voice" (2020)	"Better Without You" (2021)

Music video
- "Use My Voice" on YouTube

"Use My Voice" is a song by American rock band Evanescence. It was released on August 14, 2020, by BMG as the third single from the band's fifth studio album, The Bitter Truth. It was originally intended as the first single, but "Wasted on You" was released first due to the COVID-19 pandemic. It was nominated for the MTV Video Music Award for Best Rock Video in the 2021 MTV Video Music Awards.

== Background ==
The song was written 'to celebrate the power of speaking out in order to promote a more just world'. In a press release, Amy Lee said, "This is an era of awakening, and full of powerful beauty. I hope to inspire others to seek truth, find their own voices and use them as I step up to use mine. Don't let anybody speak for you. Only you can do that." In order to reinforce the message of the song, Lee was also accompanied by vocals delivered by other fellow musicians such as Within Temptation's Sharon den Adel, violinist Lindsey Stirling, Halestorm's Lzzy Hale and The Pretty Reckless' Taylor Momsen, as well as some of Lee's personal friends and family members. The band also worked with registration organisation HeadCount as a way of encouraging people to register and vote on the 2020 United States presidential election.

In an interview for CBS This Morning, Lee stated that the first thing that inspired her on creating a song regarding public and political issues was a moment during the Stanford University sexual assault cases trial in which a victim said to her abuser that the only thing he could not take away was her voice. After that, Lee considered that it had been hypocritical of her remaining silent about things that affect the world and decided to work on both the song and being more explicit about politics.

== Critical reception ==
Neil Z. Yeung of AllMusic called the song a "rallying cry" and one of personal awakening and female empowerment.

== Commercial performance ==
"Use My Voice" achieved moderate commercial success, appearing on several charts across the English-speaking world. In the United States, "Use My Voice" peaked at number 44 on the Rock & Alternative Airplay chart by Billboard. In Australia, the single peaked at number 45 on the Australia Digital Tracks on 24 August 2020. In Scotland, it managed to attain a position of 50 on the country's singles chart in the week of 21 August 2020. It fared slightly better in the UK, where it peaked at numbers 40 on the UK Singles Chart and 39 on the digital downloads chart. Elsewhere, it managed to peak at number 8 on the Modern Rock chart in the Czech Republic.

== Personnel ==
Credits adapted from Tidal.

- Evanescence – composer, lyricist, associated performer
- Amy Lee – vocals, piano, keyboards, additional programming
- Deena Jakoub – composer, backing vocals
- Lzzy Hale – backing vocals
- Carrie Lee – backing vocals
- Lori Lee – backing vocals
- Sharon den Adel – backing vocals
- Lindsey Stirling – backing vocals
- Taylor Momsen – backing vocals
- Amy McLawhorn – backing vocals
- Jen Majura – backing vocals
- Tiago Nunez – Programmer
- Ted Jensen – mastering engineer
- Nick Raskulinecz – mixing engineer, recording engineer

== Charts ==
Chart performance for "Use My Voice"
Chart (2020)	Peak position
Australia Digital Tracks (ARIA)	45
Czech Republic (Modern Rock)	8
France Sales (SNEP)	180
Scotland Singles (OCC)	50
UK Singles Sales (OCC)	40
UK Singles Downloads (OCC)	39
US Rock & Alternative Airplay (Billboard)	44

== Release history ==
Region	Date	Format	Label	Ref.
United States	August 14, 2020	Digital download; streaming	BMG	
United States	August 25, 2020	Active rock radio	BMG	
Italy	September 4, 2020	Contemporary hit radio	Sony	
