= The Game Is Over (song) =

2020 song by Evanescence

Single by Evanescence

from the album The Bitter Truth
- Released: July 1, 2020
- Genre: Heavy metal
- Length: 4:22
- Label: BMG
- Songwriter: Evanescence
- Producer: Nick Raskulinecz

Evanescence singles chronology
"Wasted on You" (2020)	"The Game Is Over" (2020)	"Use My Voice" (2020)

Music video
- "The Game Is Over" on YouTube

"The Game Is Over" is a song by American rock band Evanescence. The song was released as a digital download on July 1, 2020 by BMG as the second single from the band's fifth studio album, The Bitter Truth. The song was written by the band and produced by Nick Raskulinecz.

== Background ==
In a statement, Amy Lee said, "This song is about being sick of the facade. The disguises we wear for others to make them feel comfortable, the inside feelings being so different than what we show on the outside to fit within the boundaries of what's socially acceptable, or what's not going to make you unpleasant or too 'weird' to be around."

The track has been described as a heavy metal song that "brings back the nostalgia" of grunge and early 2000's emo, and has been compared to the music of Nirvana and Tool.

== Music video ==
An official music video to accompany the release of "The Game Is Over" was first released onto YouTube on July 3, 2020. Like "Wasted on You", the video was also filmed during the COVID-19 pandemic by each member of the band on their phones while in isolation, in collaboration with director P.R. Brown.

== Personnel ==
Credits adapted from Tidal.

- Nick Raskulinecz – producer
- Evanescence – composer, lyricist, associated performer
- Nathan Yarborough – engineer
- Ted Jensen – mastering engineer
- Nick Raskulinecz – mixing engineer, recording engineer

== Charts ==
Chart (2020)	Peak position
Czech Republic (Modern Rock)	14
US Digital Song Sales (Billboard)	11
US Hot Rock & Alternative Songs (Billboard)	15

== Release history ==
Region	Date	Format	Label	Ref.
United States	July 1, 2020	Digital download; streaming	BMG	
Italy	July 10, 2020	Contemporary hit radio	Sony	
