= Wasted on You (Evanescence song) =

Single by Evanescence

from the album The Bitter Truth
- Released: April 24, 2020
- Recorded: 2020
- Genre: Gothic metal; electronic rock
- Length: 4:24
- Label: BMG
- Songwriter: Evanescence
- Producer: Nick Raskulinecz

Evanescence singles chronology
"The Chain" (2019)	"Wasted on You" (2020)	"The Game Is Over" (2020)

Music video
- "Wasted on You" on YouTube

"Wasted on You" is a song performed by American rock band Evanescence. The song was released as a digital download on April 24, 2020, by BMG from the band's fifth studio album, The Bitter Truth as the lead single in place of "Use My Voice" due to COVID-19 which in turn impacted the album's completion and the latter song was later released as the third single. The song was written by the band and produced by Nick Raskulinecz.

== Music video ==
An official music video to accompany the release of "Wasted on You" was first released onto YouTube on 24 April 2020. The video was filmed by each member of the band on their phones while in isolation during the pandemic, and directed by P. R. Brown in collaboration with the band through facetime.

== Awards and nominations ==
Year	Organization	Award	Result	Ref.
2020	MTV Video Music Awards	Best Rock	Nominated	

== Personnel ==
Credits adapted from Tidal.

- Nick Raskulinecz – producer, mixing engineer, recording engineer
- Evanescence – composer, lyricist, associated performer
- Nathan Yarborough – engineer
- Ted Jensen – mastering engineer

== Charts ==
Chart performance for "Wasted on You"
Chart (2020)	Peak position
Canada Digital Songs (Billboard)	29
France Sales (SNEP)	97
Hungary (Single Top 40)	16
Scotland Singles (OCC)	49
UK Singles Sales (OCC)	42
UK Singles Downloads (OCC)	41
UK Rock & Metal (OCC)	35
US Digital Song Sales (Billboard)	26
US Hot Rock & Alternative Songs (Billboard)	16

== Release history ==
Region	Date	Format	Label	Ref.
United States	April 24, 2020	Digital download; streaming	BMG	
Italy	May 1, 2020	Contemporary hit radio	Sony	
