= Better Without You (Evanescence song) =

Single by Evanescence

from the album The Bitter Truth
- Released: March 4, 2021
- Recorded: 2020
- Genre: Hard rock
- Length: 4:03
- Label: BMG
- Songwriters: Evanescence; Nick Raskulinecz

Evanescence singles chronology
"Use My Voice" (2020)	"Better Without You" (2021)	"Afterlife" (2025)

Music video
- "Better Without You" on YouTube

"Better Without You" is a song by American rock band Evanescence. It was released on March 4, 2021 as the fourth single of the band's fifth studio album The Bitter Truth. The song was written by the band in collaboration with Nick Raskulinecz. It is a hard rock and electronic song which finds the protagonist declaring her independence from a controlling person. "Better Without You" was critically acclaimed for its rock, defiant sound and appeared on four year-end lists of best songs of 2021. A music video for "Better Without You" was directed by Eric D. Howell and released on April 16, 2021. It features a performance by the band. The song was added to the set list of the band's live performances.

== Background and composition ==
"Better Without You" was written by the band together with their year-long collaborator Nick Raskulinecz for their fifth studio album The Bitter Truth (2021). It was released as the album's fourth single on March 4, 2021.

"Better Without You" opens with a tinkling sound of a jewelry box. It is a mid-tempo hard rock song with electronic undertones whose theme revolves around defiance in "dark sonic textures". It finds Lee proclaiming that she is better without a controlling and self-serving person over a guitar riff and with emotional vocals through the chorus lines: "It makes me smile to know that I'm better without you".

A critic also found "[a]nger against male authority" as a theme in the song. Graham Hartmann, writing for Loudwire called the song a "pulsating, critical look at reality". The song lyrically discusses the people who have tried to hold Lee down in the past and is meant as a statement of independence. A writer of Revolver magazine called it a "a biting, anthemic" statement "to the forces that have attempted to hold her back".

== Critical reception ==
"Better Without You" was critically acclaimed and chosen as the album's highlight by several music critics. AllMusic writer Neil Z. Yeung chose the song as a highlight of the album and described its music as "a whirlwind of down-tuned guitars, clattering production, dramatic piano chords, and a show-stopping chorus". Josh Weiner of Atwood Magazine called the song one of the "remarkably animated work" by the band's instrumentalists, and listed it among the highlights. Nick Ruskell from Kerrang! was also praising of the song's production and said that it was "a cleaning of house that, in its chorus, sounds not unlike Adele's Skyfal theme with massive guitars behind it". Dannii Leivers of Louder Sound compared the song to Lee's earlier material in which "millions of disaffected teens found solace in her histrionic soul-searching" and called "Better Without You" "equally exhausting and exhilarating" as that early material. Bryget Chrisfield of Hysteria magazine described it musically as "dramatic flair–nursery rhyme keys offset by industrial percussion".

At the end of 2021, the song appeared on numerous year-end best-of rock and metal lists. It was included on Audio Ink Radio's Best 50 Rock And Metal Songs of 2021. It was placed at number four on a reader's poll for Song of the Year by Kerrang! magazine. It also appeared at number nine on Loudwire's 35 Best Rock Songs of 2021 with the writer calling it "an anthem just begging to be adopted for those ready to move on from a bad situation". Finally, Quarter Rock Press included it on The 50 Best Songs of the Year 2021 at number eleven.

== Music video ==
A music video for the song directed by Eric D. Howell premiered on April 16, 2021. It opens with a ballerina turning around as Lee appears performing the same round moves. It proceeds being a performance video. During one scene Lee is seen tearing a thin layer and looking through the crack. Rachel Dowd of Alternative Press called the video "striking" and opined that it showcased the band whose "emotions run rampant as they face their biggest threats head-on".

== Live performance ==
The band performed "Better Without You" live at the Sick New World fest in Las Vegas, Nevada on April 25, 2026.

== Credits and personnel ==
Video credits are adapted from the official music video of the song on YouTube.

- Director: Eric D. Howell
- Producer: Jillian Nodland
- Director of photography: Bo Hakala
- Production Designer: David Weiberg
- Art Director: Mark Wojahn
- Editor: Nate Maydole
- Production Company: Picture Factory, Inc.
