= The Bitter Truth =

2021 studio album by Evanescence

Studio album by Evanescence
- Released: March 26, 2021
- Recorded: January–November 2020
- Studios: Rock Falcon, Nashville; Blackbird, Nashville; Ocean Way, Nashville
- Genres: Alternative metal; gothic metal; hard rock
- Length: 47:19
- Label: BMG
- Producer: Nick Raskulinecz

Evanescence chronology
Synthesis (2017)	The Bitter Truth (2021)	Sanctuary (2026)

Singles from The Bitter Truth
- 1. "Wasted on You" Released: April 24, 2020; 2. "The Game Is Over" Released: July 1, 2020; 3. "Use My Voice" Released: August 14, 2020; 4. "Better Without You" Released: March 5, 2021

The Bitter Truth is the fifth studio album by American rock band Evanescence. After pandemic delays, it was released on March 26, 2021, through BMG Rights Management. Produced by Nick Raskulinecz, it is primarily an alternative metal album, following the band's 2017 orchestral-electronic album Synthesis. The Bitter Truth received a generally positive critical reception. It reached number 11 on the US Billboard 200, top five on the Billboard Independent, Alternative, Hard Rock, and Rock Albums charts, and the top 10 of multiple international album charts.

== Background and recording ==
Lead vocalist Amy Lee first spoke about a new studio album for the band in July 2018. In an interview with Detroit radio station WRIF, Lee confirmed that the band planned to work on a new album following the end of their tour in support of Synthesis.

In an interview with SiriusXM backstage at Epicenter Festival at Rockingham Speedway in May 2019, Lee again confirmed that a new album was in the works. Blabbermouth.net reported that Lee was hoping the album would be ready for release in 2020. "We're just gonna get together and see what happens this month," she said, "and start doing that more regularly until we feel like we're ready to do it."

Lee then provided an update on the album in November 2019, while taking part in a Reddit AMA. Responding to a question pertaining to new music from the band, Lee commented that she was "absolutely living in it" and was "listen[ing] to our new music every day."

I can't wait for you to hear it. It's dark and heavy. Its also got moments of weird and sparse. Little bit of everything. Definitely some of The Open Door vibes but not the same.

The band entered the studio in January 2020 with Nick Raskulinecz, with whom they had previously worked on 2011's Evanescence. Although originally planning to work with several producers across the album, the band's plans changed due to the COVID-19 pandemic. This then turned Raskulinecz into The Bitter Truth's sole producer. In August, the U.S.-based band members returned into the studio to finish writing and recording after taking COVID tests, and German guitarist Jen Majura had to work remotely. On September 9, the album was nearing completion, with "70% done". Recording was completed in November.

The album was announced in April 2020, and was originally planned for release in late 2020. The pandemic delayed the album's completion, however, and eventually pushed it to a March 2021 release.

Lee talked about the core theme of the album:

A lot of this album is about face the truth, face the bitter truths of our world and of my life and of heart. Whatever the cost of that might be on the inside. So then we can start talking about climbing out. Then we can start talking about getting to a better place. You can't appreciate the beauty of life, you can't fully experience all the good moments in life if you don't also fully experience the challenging ones, the tough ones, the painful ones.

== Composition ==
The album is described as alternative metal, gothic metal, heavy metal, and hard rock.

Amy Lee disclosed the inspiration behind the new songs in a Marie Claire interview:

"There are songs that are a part of this album that have been in the works for a decade, and songs that just started up this year. I get inspired being in nature, walking through the woods, looking up close at weird bugs." But her biggest inspirations are the emotional experiences she's had in her life, something that makes Evanescence's music "as dramatic as it is." "Things like losing someone you love, being a part of creating a new life. [They] rock me on a deep level to a point where I feel like I have to make music."

"Yeah Right", "Feeding the Dark", and "Take Cover", the latter previously debuted live in the 2016 live shows, were originally written for the 2011 self-titled album, but were reworked a decade later.

== Release and promotion ==
The Bitter Truth was first announced with the release of its lead single, "Wasted on You", in April 2020. Its second single, "The Game Is Over", followed in July. The band released an additional two singles in August's "Use My Voice" and December's "Yeah Right" (as a promotional single). The former featured guest vocalists from bands such as Veridia, Within Temptation, The Pretty Reckless and Halestorm. The latter, meanwhile, was released to coincide with the announcement of the album's tracklist and release date. The fourth single, "Better Without You", was released on March 5, 2021.

To promote the album in advance, the band performed the first single "Wasted on You" at the Jimmy Kimmel Live! show on February 19, 2021. The band also toured Europe in 2022, in a co-headlining tour alongside Within Temptation. The tour "The Bitter Truth Tour" began on 5 November 2021 in Portland, United States, just over seven months after the album's release, on a joint stage with Halestorm. The tour could only start in November due to the restrictions of the COVID-19 pandemic that affected the music industry during this period. This tour also brought a large production to the live shows and marked the band's first performance in the European country of Luxembourg, ending in the city of Recife, Brazil on 28 October 2023 after 124 concerts had taken place.

== Reception ==
=== Critical reception ===
Professional ratings
Aggregate scores
Source	Rating
AnyDecentMusic?	6.5/10
Metacritic	78/100
Review scores
Source	Rating
AllMusic	4/5 stars
Atwood Magazine	8.3/10 stars
Consequence of Sound	A−
The Daily Telegraph	3/5 stars
Gigwise	7/10 stars
Kerrang!	4/5 stars
Metal Hammer	3.5/5 stars
Metal Injection	7/10 stars
Rolling Stone	3.5/5 stars
Upset Magazine	5/5 stars

The Bitter Truth received a positive critical reception. According to the review aggregator Metacritic, The Bitter Truth received "generally favorable reviews" based on a weighted average score of 78 out of 100 from 8 critic scores. Dannii Leivers of Metal Hammer deemed the album "darkly emotional, empowering and politically charged", which is "nestled between the bold and the familiar" and has "some surprises up its sleeve". Writing for Rolling Stone, Jon Dola complimented Lee's songwriting and her ability to "sound intimate and revealing even when the music engulfs her in a maelstrom", calling the album a "take-no-prisoners battle for redemption" that bares "life's battle scars". In Renowned for Sound, Mike Corner said the record "remains satisfyingly heavy throughout", and in combination with Lee's vocals it reminds how deftly Evanescence can "harness the power of heavy rock music".

Josh Weiner from Atwood Magazine praised the album's energy, instrumental work, emotional range and uplifting theme of perseverance, concluding that "Evanescence prove that they're still a hugely compelling act" and "all of the band's positive virtues have endured". Entertainment Weekly writer Sydney Bucksbaum said Lee's voice "has never sounded more passionate than it does on The Bitter Truth". Neil McCormick of The Daily Telegraph felt that the mature tone and sharp lyrics "make up for an old-fashioned sound". For Gigwise, Vicky Greer regarded the album a "bold show of emotions that occasionally gets lost in translation" as the "vocals and lyrics are somewhat lost in production, lacking a certain emphasis – if you don’t listen at maximum volume, you might miss out on some of the finer details of the album." Los Angeles Times's Suzy Exposito said Lee wrote "her fiercest songs to date" and "Evanescence continues to own the space where frosty electronic currents collide with volcanic surges of metal catharsis and coagulate into hard rock candy". The Bitter Truth is a "beast of many moods" endowed with "stellar" musicianship and vocals, Garry Bushell reviewed in Daily Express. Danielle Chelosky wrote in Spin that Lee's strength "is clearer than ever, and she's reclaiming even more this time", while the "reckoning and pain" of experiences permeates the album with "vivid imagery", vulnerability and empowerment alongside a "bigger and bolder" sound.

Kerrang!'s Nick Ruskell said The Bitter Truth offers "comfort, catharsis and a new perspective", with Lee's contemplations looking outward as much as inward in forward-thinking notion alongside an "ever-expanding musical palette, still rooted in the vaguely gothy metal of old, but now with the heaviness taken further and punctuated with electronics and keyboards". Thomas Green of The Arts Desk considered the album "a sturdy testament to lead singer and band-boss Amy Lee's continuing surety of vision". Reviewing for Consequence, Claire Colette viewed the record as a "triumphant" return, "reminiscent of the band's older material but also entirely fresh", with the band's passion and energy "evident throughout" and Lee's "immense talent as a vocalist and songwriter consistently shining through". The album was deemed "emotionally charged" by Scott Mervis of Pittsburgh Post-Gazette, and "dynamic" by Chicago Sun-Times writer Selena Fragassi. Neil Z. Yeung of AllMusic called it "one of the band's most engaging works, balancing sonic power with Lee's inimitable vocals and songwriting", and carrying listeners "on a journey both familiar and fresh ... pushing Evanescence into the future with a graceful maturity and worldly perspective." Revolver called The Bitter Truth a "triumphant statement of perseverance, with Lee seizing her role as alt-metal elder stateswoman for some of the hardest hitting songs of her career."

=== Accolades ===
Publication	Accolade	Rank	Ref.
AllMusic	Favorite Metal Albums 2021	—	
Audio Ink Radio	Best 50 Rock And Metal Songs of 2021 ("Better Without You")	—	
Carretera y Manta	Top 15 Best Albums of the Year	8	
Confraria Floydstock	The 25 Best Albums of 2021	—	
Consequence	Top Metal & Hard Rock Albums	26	
Global Metal Apocalypse	Global Metal Apocalypse (GMA) Awards 2021 - The Results	5	
Goldmine	Fabulous Albums of 2021	6	
Goldmine	Fabulous Songs of 2021 ("Use My Voice")	3	
Kerrang!	The 50 Best Albums of 2021	49	
Kerrang!	Reader's Poll Results - Song Of The Year ("Better Without You")	4	
Knac.com	Halo's Top Ten Releases for 2021	2	
Lost Between the Pages	Favorite Albums of 2021	—	
Loudwire	The 45 Best Rock + Metal Albums of 2021	25	
Loudwire	The 35 Best Rock Songs Of 2021 ("Better Without You")	9	
Metal Hammer	Top 10 Alternative Metal Albums of 2021	3	
Notizie Musica	Top 10 Albums of 2021	8	
Quarter Rock Press	The 50 Best Albums of the Year 2021	8	
Quarter Rock Press	The 50 Best Songs of the Year 2021 ("Better Without You")	11	
Revolver	Fan Poll: 10 Best Albums of 2021	3	
Riff	108 Best Albums of 2021	41	
Roadie Crew	Best Of 2021 (Fan Poll)	8	
Rock Sound	Albums of the Year 2021	—	
Wikimetal	Top 50 Best Rock & Metal Albums of 2021	4	

== Track listing ==
The Bitter Truth track listing
No.	Title	Writer(s)	Length
1.	"Artifact/The Turn"	Amy Lee; Scott Kirkland	2:26
2.	"Broken Pieces Shine"	Evanescence	3:50
3.	"The Game Is Over"	Evanescence	4:22
4.	"Yeah Right"	Evanescence; Will B. Hunt	3:29
5.	"Feeding the Dark"	Evanescence; B. Hunt	4:14
6.	"Wasted on You"	Evanescence	4:24
7.	"Better Without You"	Evanescence; Nick Raskulinecz	4:05
8.	"Use My Voice"	Evanescence; Deena Jakoub	4:01
9.	"Take Cover"	Evanescence; B. Hunt	3:14
10.	"Far from Heaven"	Lee	4:57
11.	"Part of Me"	Evanescence	3:59
12.	"Blind Belief"	Evanescence	4:13
Total length:			47:19

Target exclusive and Japanese edition bonus tracks
No.	Title	Writer(s)	Length
13.	"Cruel Summer" (Bananarama cover; Live from Home)	Sara Dallin; Siobhan Fahey; Keren Woodward; Steven Jolley; Tony Swain	3:23
14.	"The Chain" (Fleetwood Mac cover; from Gears 5)	Mick Fleetwood; John McVie; Christine McVie; Lindsey Buckingham; Stephanie Nicks	4:12
Total length:			54:55

Japanese deluxe edition bonus DVD
No.	Title	Length
1.	"The Making of The Bitter Truth"	13:13
2.	"The Making of Use My Voice"	2:45
Total length:		15:58

Limited box set disc 2 Live Studio Session
No.	Title	Writer(s)	Length
1.	"Wasted on You" (Live studio session)	Evanescence	4:24
2.	"The Game Is Over" (Live studio session)	Evanescence	4:23
3.	"The Only One" (Live studio session)	Lee; Terry Balsamo	4:32
4.	"Sick" (Live studio session)	Evanescence; B. Hunt	3:30
5.	"Going Under" (Live studio session)	Ben Moody; Lee; David Hodges	3:39
6.	"Use My Voice" (Live studio session)	Evanescence; Jakoub	4:01
7.	"Bring Me to Life" (Live studio session)	Moody; Lee; Hodges	3:30
8.	"Lost in Paradise" (Live studio session)	Lee	5:05
9.	"Glory Box" (Portishead cover; Live studio session)	Portishead; Isaac Hayes	3:56
10.	"Across the Universe" (The Beatles cover)	John Lennon; Paul McCartney	3:42
Total length:			40:42

Limited box set cassette The Bitter Truth Evolution
No.	Title	Length
1.	"Wolves"
2.	"GIO"
3.	"UMV"
4.	"Will Can't Catch"
5.	"Without a Sound"
6.	"Take Cover"
7.	"WOY Bells"
8.	"Writing"
9.	"Smurfs on Fire"
10.	"Blind Belief"
11.	"Music Box"
12.	"Red Stickers"
13.	"Avocado Cream"
14.	"Yeah Right"
15.	"Back to the Future"
16.	"BPS #7.1"
17.	"On My Own"
18.	"Teleportation"
19.	"Farther"
20.	"The Game Is Over" (Instrumental)
21.	"Yeah Right" (Instrumental)
22.	"Use My Voice" (Instrumental)
23.	"Better Without You" (Instrumental)
24.	"Wasted on You" (Instrumental)
25.	"Far from Heaven" (Instrumental)
26.	"Blind Belief" (Instrumental)
Total length:		48:47

== Personnel ==
Credits adapted from the liner notes of The Bitter Truth.

Evanescence

- Amy Lee – lead vocals, piano, keyboards, additional programming
- Troy McLawhorn – guitar
- Jen Majura – guitar, backing vocals
- Tim McCord – bass
- Will Hunt – drums

Additional musicians

- David Campbell – string arrangements
- Alan Umstead – strings contractor, concertmaster
- Nashville Music Scoring – orchestra
- Lzzy Hale – backing vocals (track 8)
- Taylor Momsen – backing vocals (track 8)
- Deena Jakoub – backing vocals (track 8)
- Lindsey Stirling – backing vocals (track 8)
- Sharon den Adel – backing vocals (track 8)
- Lori Lee – backing vocals (track 8)
- Carrie Lee – backing vocals (track 8)
- Amy McLawhorn – backing vocals (track 8)

Additional personnel

- Nick Raskulinecz – production, mixing, recording
- Nathan Yarborough – engineering
- Logan Greeson – assistant engineering
- Nick Spezia – strings engineering
- Ted Jensen – mastering
- Tiago Nuñez – programming (tracks 2–11)
- Will B. Hunt – additional programming
- Chris Vrenna – additional programming (track 10)
- Scott Kirkland – programming production (track 1)
- Josh Hartzler – cover photo
- P.R. Brown – album design, photography
- Nick Fancher – photography

== Charts ==
=== Weekly charts ===
Weekly chart performance for The Bitter Truth
Chart (2021)	Peak position
Australian Albums (ARIA)	3
Austrian Albums (Ö3 Austria)	5
Belgian Albums (Ultratop Flanders)	4
Belgian Albums (Ultratop Wallonia)	10
Canadian Albums (Billboard)	14
Croatian Albums (HDU)	28
Czech Albums (ČNS IFPI)	43
Dutch Albums (Album Top 100)	15
Finnish Albums (Suomen virallinen lista)	18
French Albums (SNEP)	34
German Albums (Offizielle Top 100)	2
Hungarian Albums (MAHASZ)	38
Italian Albums (FIMI)	20
Japan Hot Albums (Billboard Japan)	38
Japanese Albums (Oricon)	40
Polish Albums (ZPAV)	15
Portuguese Albums (AFP)	2
Scottish Albums (Official Charts)	3
Slovak Albums (ČNS IFPI)	96
Spanish Albums (Promusicae)	16
Swedish Hard Rock Albums (Sverigetopplistan)	6
Swiss Albums (Schweizer Hitparade)	1
UK Albums (Official Charts)	4
UK Rock & Metal Albums (Official Charts)	1
US Billboard 200	11
US Top Alternative Albums (Billboard)	2
US Top Hard Rock Albums (Billboard)	1
US Independent Albums (Billboard)	4
US Top Rock Albums (Billboard)	2
US Indie Store Album Sales (Billboard)	1

=== Year-end charts ===
Year-end chart performance for The Bitter Truth
Chart (2021)	Position
German Albums (Offizielle Top 100)	97
US Top Current Album Sales (Billboard)	80
US Top Alternative Albums (Billboard)	46
US Top Rock Albums (Billboard)	93

== Release history ==
Release dates and formats for The Bitter Truth
Region	Date	Format(s)	Edition(s)	Label	Ref.
Japan	March 24, 2021	CD	Japanese	Virgin; Universal Japan	
Japan	March 24, 2021	CD; DVD	Deluxe	Virgin; Universal Japan	
