= Lost in Paradise (Evanescence song) =

2012 song by Evanescence

Single by Evanescence

from the album Evanescence
- Released: May 25, 2012
- Recorded: 2011; Blackbird Studio, Nashville, Tennessee
- Genre: Symphonic rock
- Length: 4:42
- Label: Wind-up
- Songwriter: Amy Lee
- Producer: Nick Raskulinecz

Evanescence singles chronology
"My Heart Is Broken" (2011)	"Lost in Paradise" (2012)	"Imperfection" (2017)

Music video
- "Lost in Paradise" on YouTube

"Lost in Paradise" is a song by American rock band Evanescence from their third studio album, Evanescence (2011). It was released by Wind-up Records on May 25, 2012 as the third single from the album. Although initially composed by singer Amy Lee as a personal song and anticipated to become a B-side, it was later recorded by the band for the album. A snippet of the song premiered online on July 15, 2011, prior to the album's release in October. Produced by Nick Raskulinecz, "Lost in Paradise" is a rock ballad inspired by the struggles in Lee's life during Evanescence's hiatus. An alternative version of the song appears on the band's fourth studio album, Synthesis (2017).

The song received generally positive reviews from music critics, who praised Lee's vocals and its piano accompaniment, with some highlighting it as one of the album's best tracks. The song charted at number 99 on the Billboard Hot 100 and number nine on the UK Rock Chart. It also charted at numbers 31, 89, and 174 on the Swiss Singles Chart, Canadian Hot 100, and UK Singles Chart respectively. The band added the song to the set list of their third worldwide tour Evanescence Tour (2011–12). Live footage of their performances at the Carnival of Madness tour was used for the song's music video.

== Background and release ==
"Lost in Paradise" was written by Evanescence singer Amy Lee, with production handled by Nick Raskulinecz. The song was recorded at Blackbird Studio in Nashville, Tennessee in 2011. A snippet of the song premiered on July 15, 2011 on MTV News, three months prior to the release of its album, Evanescence. Lee initially anticipated that the song could become a B-side at most as she wrote it just for herself, not intending it for the album. However, after showing the song to Raskulinecz, he requested the band record the song for Evanescence. Lee credits Raskulinecz for the idea of the full band joining mid-way through the song. In an interview, she said, "That's the one that made us cry".

At Toronto's Liberty Studios on August 22, 2011, Lee previewed five mastered songs from Evanescence to a selected crowd of thirty people, including "Lost in Paradise". During an interview with Fuse in May 2012, the band revealed that it would be released as the album's third overall single. Wind-Up Records released the digital single on May 25, 2012.

== Composition ==
"Lost in Paradise" is a symphonic rock, piano and power ballad, inspired by Lee's love for Evanescence and personal reflection on her past struggles. She revealed that after deciding to take a break, she spent a lot of time with her husband and having a simpler life away from her band, but still feeling like she was not "whole". Instead, she felt lost and missed her work with the band and the writing process. Later, she decided to write the song as an apology to her fans for being gone for so long. Starting with piano and Lee's vocals, the song slowly builds, "layering on stirring strings, booming timpani and, at the climax, some thunderous guitar chords" as stated by James Montgomery of MTV News. Montgomery said that the song evokes "Jóga" (1997) by Icelandic recording artist Björk, one of Lee's favorite artists, with Lee stating: "That's a big inspirational song for me. That's a song through my life that I've listened to a whole bunch. And to me, Björk, what makes her style are the strings, the orchestral elements, and that passion that it creates." NME's Tom Goodwyn found the song to be reminiscent of Evanescence's "My Immortal" from their debut studio album Fallen (2003), "before it was re-recorded with that massive guitar breakdown."

== Critical reception ==
The song received generally positive reviews from contemporary music critics. Montgomery wrote that the song "is unapologetically epic and uncompromisingly raw, a song that manages to seem both all-encompassing and intimate, often at the same time." In his review of Evanescence, Rick Florino of Artistdirect concluded "The record's centerpiece is the elegantly dark ballad, 'Lost in Paradise'. It's in 'Paradise' that Lee's genius floats to the forefront most prominently. She paints a poignant picture of yearning for redemption from heartache crooning, 'We've been falling for all this time and now I'm lost in paradise.'" In another review, he called the song "the record's standout ballad." Kerrang!'s Steve Beebee called the song "majestic" Dane Prokofiev of PopMatters said that the song was one of the two along with "Erase This" which "really caught" his attention. Edna Gundersen of USA Today put the song on her list of songs to consider downloading.

Chad Grischow of IGN wrote: "Lee's skyward vocals suit the album's obsession with the emotional frustration and devastation of a break-up well, ripe with romantically longing tunes like gorgeous power ballad "Lost In Paradise", where her breathy vocals in the beginning awaken as she passionately apologizes for not sticking with the guy who believed in her." Digital Spy's Lewis Corner said that the song "continues the trend as a black-eyed rock ballad of towering string sections and lyrics of despair and heartbreak." Billboard magazine's Christa Titus wrote that Lee's voice was "powerful and flexible as ever" in "the deep croons that introduce 'Lost in Paradise'." A more mixed review for the song was given by Marc Hirsh of The Boston Globe who wrote that the slow tempo of the song provided by piano and strings made it a drag where "the band itself gets very little breathing room."

== Chart performance ==
Following the digital release of the album, "Lost in Paradise" peaked at number 39 on the Swiss Singles Chart on October 23, 2011. On the Billboard Hot 100 in the United States, the song debuted at number 99 for the week ending October 16, 2011. The same week it peaked on the Hot Digital Songs and Canadian Hot 100 at numbers 53 and 89 respectively. The song also debuted at number nine on the UK Rock Chart for the week ending October 22, 2011. After the song was released as a single, it debuted at number 71 on the Austrian Singles Chart for the week ending June 8, 2012.

== Live performances ==
The band added "Lost in Paradise" to the set list of the Evanescence Tour. While reviewing a performance of the song, Rick Florino of Artistdirect said, "Speaking of vocal prowess, Lee reached the level of legends during 'Lost In Paradise'. Sitting at a piano center stage, she entranced with a shimmering melody and heartbreaking, hypnotic hook. Stripped of any pomp and circumstance, Lee's talents transfixed. As the song built, the band entered rounding out the timeless ballad with a distinct heaviness." Serene Dominic of The Arizona Republic wrote: "The biggest shrieks came when the piano movers made their first appearance and wheeled a baby grand onstage for 'Lost in Paradise.'" Joel Francis of The Kansas City Star described the performance of the song as "spellbinding". Along with "Bring Me to Life" (2003), the song was played in the band's concert with a live orchestra for the Nobel Peace Prize in Oslo, Norway on December 11, 2011.

=== Music video ===
During an interview with Fuse in May, 2012, the band confirmed that a music video for the song would be released. The music video was planned for release after the Carnival Of Madness tours which the band embarked on in the summer of 2012. By the end of the tour, Lee asked fans via Twitter to send live footage from the tour so that it can be part of the video. A lyric video was uploaded to the band's official YouTube account on May 11, 2012. The official music video for "Lost in Paradise", released on February 14, 2013, focuses on the band's live tour, featuring footage of the band performing the song filmed by fans in the crowd from around the world.

== Track listing ==
- Digital single (May 25, 2012)
1. "Lost in Paradise" – 4:43
2. "Lost in Paradise" (Live) – 5:01
3. "My Immortal" (Live) – 4:25
- Promo – Digital single (June 4, 2012)
1. "Lost in Paradise" (Album version) – 4:44

== Charts ==
Chart (2011–12)	Peak position
Austria (Ö3 Austria Top 40)	71
Canadian Hot 100	89
Italy (FIMI)	31
Switzerland (Schweizer Hitparade)	39
UK Rock & Metal (Official Charts Company)	9
UK Singles (Official Charts Company)	174
US Billboard Hot 100	99

== Release history ==
Region	Date	Format	Label
Australia	May 25, 2012	Digital download	Wind-up Records
Austria	May 25, 2012	Digital download	Wind-up Records
Belgium	May 25, 2012	Digital download	Wind-up Records
Canada	May 25, 2012	Digital download	Wind-up Records
Denmark	May 25, 2012	Digital download	Wind-up Records
Finland	May 25, 2012	Digital download	Wind-up Records
Greece	May 25, 2012	Digital download	Wind-up Records
Ireland	May 25, 2012	Digital download	Wind-up Records
Israel	May 25, 2012	Digital download	Wind-up Records
Italy	May 25, 2012	Digital download	Wind-up Records
Luxembourg	May 25, 2012	Digital download	Wind-up Records
Mexico	May 25, 2012	Digital download	Wind-up Records
Netherlands	May 25, 2012	Digital download	Wind-up Records
Norway	May 25, 2012	Digital download	Wind-up Records
Portugal	May 25, 2012	Digital download	Wind-up Records
Spain	May 25, 2012	Digital download	Wind-up Records
Sweden	May 25, 2012	Digital download	Wind-up Records
Switzerland	May 25, 2012	Digital download	Wind-up Records
New Zealand	May 25, 2012	Digital download	Wind-up Records
France	May 28, 2012	Digital download	Wind-up Records
Germany	May 28, 2012	Digital download	Wind-up Records
Japan	May 28, 2012	Digital download	Wind-up Records
Italy	June 8, 2012	Contemporary hit radio	Wind-up Records
