= Evanescence (Evanescence album) =

2011 studio album by Evanescence

Studio album by Evanescence
- Released: October 7, 2011
- Recorded: February 22, 2010 – April 2010 (Note: Steve Lillywhite sessions); April–June 2011 (Note: Nick Raskulinecz sessions)
- Studio: Blackbird (Berry Hill, Tennessee)
- Genres: Gothic metal; nu metal; hard rock; symphonic metal
- Length: 47:15
- Label: Wind-up
- Producer: Nick Raskulinecz

Evanescence chronology
| The Open Door (2006) | Evanescence (2011) | Lost Whispers (2016) |

Singles from Evanescence
- 1. "What You Want" Released: August 9, 2011; 2. "My Heart Is Broken" Released: November 11, 2011; 3. "Lost in Paradise" Released: May 25, 2012

Evanescence is the third studio album by American rock band Evanescence, released on October 7, 2011 by Wind-up Records. The band began writing the album in June 2009. Its release was delayed several times; on February 22, 2010, the band entered the studio with producer Steve Lillywhite but later stopped working with him because he "wasn't the right fit". At the time the album was scheduled for an August or September 2010 release, but lead singer Amy Lee later announced that Evanescence had postponed recording to write more material. In April 2011, they returned to the studio with producer Nick Raskulinecz. Evanescence is the first Evanescence album to be written as a band, with Lee, guitarists Terry Balsamo and Troy McLawhorn, bassist Tim McCord and drummer Will Hunt co-writing the music together. It is the last album the band recorded under Wind-Up.

According to Lee, the band brought influences from Björk, Depeche Mode, Massive Attack, MGMT, and Portishead to the album. Evanescence's songs contain sounds and influences characteristic of nu metal, hard rock, and symphonic metal. The album received generally positive reviews from music critics, and debuted at number one on the Billboard 200 chart with 127,000 copies sold in its first week. It also topped four other Billboard charts: Rock Albums, Digital Albums, Alternative Albums, and Hard Rock Albums. The album was successful worldwide, appearing on the charts of over 20 countries. The band promoted Evanescence by premiering songs online on a number of websites and appearing on several television shows.

The first single from the album, "What You Want", was released on August 9, 2011; "My Heart Is Broken", the album's second single, was released on November 11. "Lost in Paradise" was released internationally as its third single on May 25, 2012, and "The Other Side" was serviced to US modern rock radio stations as a promotional single on June 11. In 2011 the band embarked on the Evanescence Tour, their third worldwide tour, to promote the album with The Pretty Reckless and Fair to Midland.

== Background ==
After finishing the tour for Evanescence's previous album, The Open Door, Amy Lee stated that she "didn't know what [she] was going to do next", and took a break to live life away from the industry. During this period, she spent time painting, listened to folk and indie music, and learned to play the harp. After about 18 months, she began writing music again. At the beginning of 2009, she wrote a song with her friend programmer Will "Science" Hunt that was in an electronic direction, which inspired her to bring some of that sound into the next Evanescence album. Lee and Hunt worked on programming-driven music at her home studio and in Texas. In the early sessions, she went into the studio with producer Steve Lillywhite, who had contacted Evanescence's record label wanting to work with her. In a June 2009 post on the Evanescence website, Lee wrote that the band was writing material for an album planned for release the following year. In November 2009, the band played two one-off shows in New York and Brazil. Lee said that she "ended up falling back in love with Evanescence again" and collaborated with the rest of the band, with the album becoming "a group project."

== Recording ==
Evanescence and Will "Science" Hunt entered the studio with producer Steve Lillywhite on February 22, 2010 to begin recording the album. Sessions took place in MSR Studios, New York. Lee described the album in progress as "sounds that are distorted, changed, reversed", with moments "that are amazingly heavy, but then there are moments that are completely stripped down", and cited Bjork, Nine Inch Nails, and music with a lot of programming as inspiration. She said that the idea was to "take synthetic and atmospheric sounds and find a way to blur the line between organic and synthetic", and called it a "rhythmically driven record". The Roots drummer Questlove contributed drums on a song titled "You Got a Lot to Learn". In March, Lee posted two audio clips from the sessions on her Twitter, and stated in an interview that the band were working on about 16 songs. At the time, the album was intended for an August or September 2010 release.

The Lillywhite sessions ended in April 2010. On June 21, 2010, Lee announced that Evanescence had suspended recording to continue work on the album and "get our heads into the right creative space". She also stated that their label Wind-up Records was experiencing "uncertain times" which would further delay the album's release. Lee later stated that Lillywhite "wasn't the right fit" for the band and it ultimately wasn't "coming together right". When the rest of the band came into the sessions with Lillywhite and they tried to record the songs, "we just weren't all the way there. it wasn't sounding right". Lee said that some of the songs recorded under Lillywhite, which were more stripped-down and programming-based, weren't right for Evanescence and she realized were more fitting to a solo project. In a June 2011 interview, label president Ed Vetri said that he supported Lee's decision to restart: "One thing we do at Wind-up is, we're patient. I[f] it's not right, it's not coming out. If it takes a year or four years, [we're] going to take the time it needs to write the right record."

Lee and the rest of the band worked together on reworking the songs and writing more music as a group. "We've really relied on each other. And everyone being a part of this album, from the ground up, is an entirely new approach for us", Lee stated; "there's nobody that's just coming in to play guitar. Everybody's invested." The band often jammed and sat down and wrote together, which was a first for Evanescence as before this album Lee had always written the music by herself or with one other person. The band then went into the studio with producer Nick Raskulinecz, whose recent work they liked. They began recording with Rasculinecz in early April 2011, at Blackbird Studio in Nashville. On June 12, Lee announced that guitarist Troy McLawhorn was officially back in Evanescence, and confirmed the album's release date to be October 4, 2011. The label changed the release date to October 11.

"Going into this record, before we even went into Blackbird, I knew that sonically it was going to be a big, dense album, so me and [engineer] Paul Fig were very aware of that. The recording of it was very calculated. We knew that there would be lots of tracks—drums, drum samples, a big bass sound, two guitar players, piano, tons of vocals, harmonies and overlapping tracks—just massive. So it was a lot to organize and keep track of, but at the same time I wanted to make sure that by the time you got to the mix you could still hear everything."

— Producer Nick Rasculinecz on recording the album.

Raskulinecz said that songs started with Lee's piano melodies, and Lee, Balsamo and McCord were the core of the music he had heard at that time. When drummer Will Hunt came in "things evolved a little bit more, and he was in on some of the songwriting", and guitarist McLawhorn was also "really important in bringing some great ideas to the table". Raskulinecz called Hunt "an animal on the drums" and said that the "rhythm section of [Hunt] and [McCord] is on fire" and "everybody in [the band] is a great musician".

Alongside the layering of parts, Raskulinecz and engineer Paul Fig focused on the base of the album being entirely performance-based. Raskulinecz had the band play and record multiple live takes, then "comping from there, and then going back and punching in." Fig stated that Raskulinecz "likes to concentrate on the performance, so it's usually beginning to end. ... Generally we'll have six or seven playlists of drums we like and we'll comp something together from those performances. But he really doesn't want it to sound like somebody chopped it up and then slapped it together." Hunt played a 26-inch kick drum, which Fig miked with a Sennheiser e 602 on one side and a FET 47 on the other. His drum kit's toms were recorded with AKG 451s set in hypercardioid.

Apart from piano, Lee recorded various keyboards including a Roland RD700X and various soft synths. She also recorded the analog synth bass pedal Moog Taurus that Raskulinecz suggested. The piano was recorded on tape with multiple mics inside, a PZM on the floor beneath, and AKG C-12s farther away. Lee recorded demo vocals without headphones with a Shure SM7. "When we did the vocals for real, obviously we did it differently. She's an amazing singer—she can sing all day long", Raskulinecz stated. Fig added that in the few days that Raskulinecz was working somewhere else, he was working with her on vocals and he "was worried maybe I was pushing her too hard. But she's like an athlete. She stepped to the plate and hit it out of the park." Lee spent about a month recording vocals, stating that she really pushed herself vocally. Her lead vocals were recorded with a long-body Neumann U 47, and her backing vocals were captured with a Telefunken Elektroakustik 251. Some of the songs have 30 to 40 tracks of vocals.

Balsamo and McLawhorn played multiple guitars through a variety of large and small amps, including Marshalls (2250 and JCM 800), AC-30s, Bogner Shiva and Uberschall, and Buddha Superdrive combo amps. A combination of guitar mics were used, including Shure 57s, FET 47s, AKG 441s, Mojave Audio MA-100s, and Sennheiser 421s, going across four amps. For some overdubs, they used an MA-100, MA-200 and a [Neumann] 87. Raskulinecz said that as there were a lot of piano parts on the songs there aren't many guitar-style overdubs.

After the instruments and most of the vocal tracks were completed, Chris Vrenna contributed more electronic sounds and textures. There are over 30 pairs of stereo tracks of electronics on every song. "It’s little parts and noises and ambience; more synth, lots of low bass. This album has a massive low end", Raskulinecz noted.

The last stage of the process was recording the strings from David Campbell, who worked with Lee on Evanescence's previous albums. Strings were recorded at Avatar Studios in Manhattan in two days. In the final mix, most songs had over 100 tracks. Raskulinecz said that "To play one song back, we had to have two Pro Tools rigs and a tape machine. We completely maxed out the first Pro Tools rig with just the band—guitar, bass, drums, vocals, piano. Then there was another Pro Tools rig that had all of the programming and electronics and some of the strings on it. And then there was a Studer 24-track chasing with all the rest of the strings on it." The album was mixed by Randy Staub at The Warehouse in Vancouver, on Studio 1's SSL G Series console, and Ted Jensen mastered it at Sterling Sound in New York City.

Lee said of working with Raskulinecz:

Nick is an awesome producer. He really helped me get the plan and have confidence in the decisions that we made. For me, I have a lot of ideas and sometimes it just comes down to "OK, everything that I'm doing I have two options!" ... as I'm doing these things I'm asking him from the vocal booth or the piano room or whatever, "Which one of these should I do?" He's good at helping me make a quick decision. I really trust his opinion because he makes great records.

In December 2015, Lee posted her cover of "Baby Did a Bad Bad Thing" by Chris Isaak, which she recorded in 2009 was intended to appear on the initial album. She explained that the record company had rejected the original project: "The suits had a change of heart during a frustrating recording process and I was told that none of the songs I'd been pouring my heart into for a year, in any form, were good enough- time to start over. I was devastated. I was furious. I was determined to take control of the situation and use it to push myself forward. It ended up making me angry enough to write Evanescence's heaviest album- which I love- and we did end up using 3 songs from the original project."

== Title and concept ==
In a June 2011 Kerrang! interview, Lee said that the album would be self-titled and was "about the band; it's more of a band record." Lee explained that the concept "to me is about falling back in love with this thing, with Evanescence, with what I've obsessed over for a decade, longer than that." There were originally many album-title ideas, but Lee said that as the project became more collaborative "it just felt like this is who we are, it's a band. And to have that feeling in the music where the band is so pumped up, it was just the only title that felt right. It's about falling back in love with this thing in a major way." In an MTV News interview, she said that 16 songs had been recorded but not all would be included on the album. It was later decided to release two versions of the album: a deluxe edition with all 16 songs and a standard edition with 12.

Evanescence's cover artwork was introduced on the band's website on August 30, 2011. It is their first album cover which does not feature Lee. In an interview, she discussed the cover: "Well, both of our other records are me on the cover, and I think it's cool to have that photo, you know, that people can look at and go, 'OK, that's who that is.' But I feel like, by now, they know who we are, and I wanted something really different. I didn't feel like we had to put a photo on the cover, I wanted it to be more mysterious and more about Evanescence itself, not just me." The cover, black with vapor behind the band's name, is a play on the meaning of "evanescence" ("to dissipate like vapor").

== Composition ==
=== Musical style and inspiration ===
Looser. This album is not so glossy or tight. It's more instinctive. It's big on groove and there's some real musicianship that we're really proud of. Everyone knows our sound but that's just a foundation and we've danced on top of that! It's still very heavy and dark but we were having fun with it.

— Amy Lee, about the album's sound

During the Steve Lillywhite sessions, Lee described the album as a "rainbow of sounds" with heavy, stripped-out songs. According to Lee, it had electro influences and a lot of drum programming fused with live drums, citing Taiko drums. As for the lyrical theme, she said the songs were about what she was going through at the time, and there were moments of "Hey, I'm over it and I'm good" and others of fun sarcasm, saying "everything's not the most dramatic thing in the world." She also added that there were songs that would get "really, really deep." The album's themes were unknown worlds, the ocean's abyss, life within dreams, strength, detachment, love and liars. During the later sessions with Nick Raskulincecz, she discussed two of the album's themes: brokenness ("Brokenness has become a little bit of theme, without necessarily offering a solution") and oceans. In a later MTV interview, Lee mentioned other themes: "the quest for freedom, and then there's songs that are just about falling in love". Lee wrote a few songs on the harp, including "Secret Door" and "My Heart is Broken." She said that Evanescence used new and vintage instruments (such as a harp, synthesizers and the Moog Taurus Pedal) and recorded the ballads "Secret Door" and "My Heart Is Broken". In a Kerrang! interview, Lee said she was inspired by her life and personal relationships.

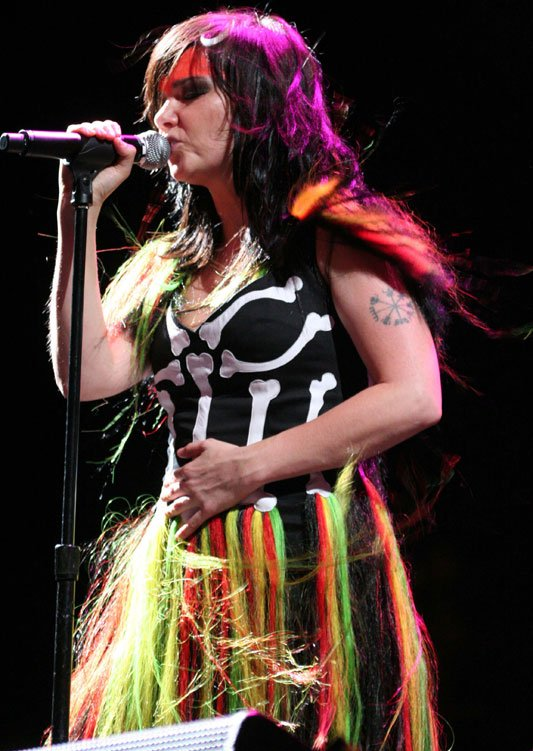
Lee cited Björk (pictured) as an influence on Evanescence.

According to Lee, the album was fun but not in a "poppy way" and the band enjoyed its recording. She was inspired by her relationship with Evanescence's fans: "I can really hear myself singing about my relationship with Evanescence and with the fans. There's always one big relationship on a record that I sing about the most. I feel like my big relationship on this album [is] with Evanescence itself, and with the fans. I think lyrically you're hearing a lot about a relationship, a struggle with a relationship or love in a relationship, and mostly I'm singing about that."

For the album, the band was influenced by artists such as Björk, Depeche Mode, Massive Attack, MGMT, and Portishead. Lewis Corner of the Digital Spy website noted that rumbling guitars and dainty strings were present on most of the album's songs: "Amy Lee declares over roaring guitars and classical strings, reinforcing their medieval influences as opposed to the electronic sound they've been purporting."

This marks the first Evanescence recording since their 1998 self titled demo to not feature backing choruses, which were introduced until the Origin demo album in 2000.

=== Music and lyrics ===
Lee shares writing credits with other members of the band on 11 of the standard-edition album's 12 songs. Evanescence's first track and lead single, "What You Want", was described as one of the band's most unusual songs with heavy guitar melodies, loud drums and a freedom theme. Opening with drums and a synchronized synthesizer, Lee sings "Do what you, what you want / If you have a dream for better / Do what you, what you want / 'Til you don't want it anymore" before the song's rhythmic, guitar-driven beat. Lyrically, the song explores a relationship which is not working out, despite present love. "Made of Stone", one of the album's oldest songs, has heavy-metal influences. "The Change" (originally entitled "Purple"), which begins gently and grows more insistent, has been compared to "Digital Bath" by the American alternative metal band Deftones. The fourth track (and second single), "My Heart Is Broken", is a ballad written for harp and recorded with a piano. It begins with the piano and Lee's vocals, evolving into rhythmic guitars and strings. In the chorus Lee sings, "I will never find a way to heal my soul/ And I will wander 'til the end of time/ Torn away from you/ My heart is broken".

The fifth track, "The Other Side", has churning, chunky guitars, a double-bass drum and Lee's "ethereal, widescreen" vocals with elements of R&B. Lyrically, the song's theme is death. "Erase This", formerly titled "Vanilla", was noted by Mary Ouellette of Loudwire as an "uptempo rocker" similar to "What You Want" which would sound better played live rather than through earphones. "Lost in Paradise" is a symphonic rock ballad which begins with piano, strings and Lee's unlayered vocals before adding the band for the song's climax; its lyrics reflect Lee's past struggles, apologizing to her fans for the band's five-year absence. The song's musical structure was compared to "Jóga", by the Icelandic recording artist Björk. "Sick" has a loose, lazy melody and a chanted chorus; one of the first songs written for the album, it "set[s] a heavy direction for the rest of the record." "End of the Dream" begins "full bore with chunky guitar, then falls into a brooding grove with piano underpinning Lee's unmistakable vocals." In the chorus, Lee sings "Follow your heart 'til it bleeds," evincing the track's "seize the day" message. Lee said about the song, "It's about understanding that this life isn't forever, and how you have to live it, embrace even the pain, before it's all over. As much as it hurts, it just means you're alive. So don't be so afraid to get hurt that you miss out on living." "Oceans" begins with a big, low synth and a vocal before the band joins in. According to Lee, "It's big and lush. We've been having a lot of fun playing that one especially." "Never Go Back" (originally called "Orange") examines "loss from the perspective of someone losing someone in a tragedy". Lee said that the song, with the lyrics "It's all gone, the only world I've ever known", was inspired by the 2011 Tōhoku earthquake and tsunami. The only song that remained faithful to the original electronic direction, "Swimming Home" is an electro-pop song with grinding guitars and a "weeping" piano.

== Release and promotion ==
Evanescence was first released in snippets, with portions of "What You Want", "The Other Side" and "Lost in Paradise" previewed on MTV News on July 11, 13 and 15 respectively. Several songs were made available online, including "The Other Side", which premiered on September 21 at Hot Topic; "My Heart Is Broken" on September 27, and "End of the Dream" on Spin on October 4. All songs became available on Spin on October 7. A Renholdër remix of "Made of Stone" appears on the soundtrack and in the closing credits of the film Underworld: Awakening, and a Photek remix of "New Way to Bleed" is on The Avengers soundtrack Avengers Assemble: Music from and Inspired by the Motion Picture.

On August 8, Evanescence appeared on "MTV First: Evanescence" to introduce the album's first single, "What You Want", with a live performance and an extended interview. Lee went to Toronto's Liberty Studios on August 22 to preview five mastered songs from the new album ("What You Want", "The Change", "The Other Side", "My Heart Is Broken" and "Lost in Paradise") to a selected audience of 30. In September 2011, Lee said that the band wanted the album to be released as soon as possible given the long wait time, with her noting, "I'm not waiting until 2012, we have to push this through and make it happen this fall". Evanescence appeared at the Rock in Rio festival on October 2, 2011, performing "What You Want", "Made of Stone", "The Change", "The Other Side", "My Heart Is Broken", "Sick" and several songs from their previous two albums. Before Evanescence's US release, Lee appeared on the Billboard website on October 11 to promote the album. The band appeared on Jimmy Kimmel Live! on October 15, performing "What You Want" and "Going Under". On December 12, Evanescence appeared at the Nobel Peace Prize Concert, where they performed "Lost in Paradise" and 2003's "Bring Me to Life". On February 1, 2012, the band performed "My Heart Is Broken" on The Tonight Show with Jay Leno, and two days later they played "Made of Stone" and "The Other Side" on Conan.

=== Tour ===
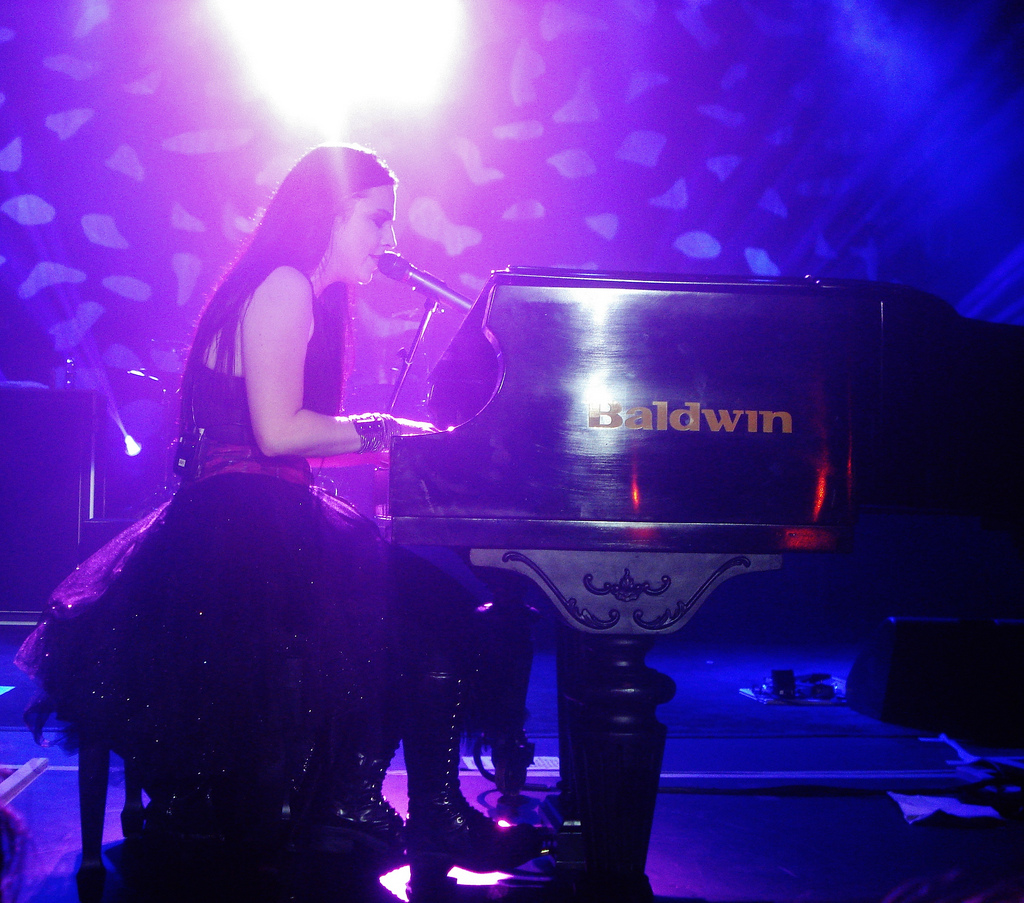
Lee performing on October 25, 2011, during the Evanescence Tour

Evanescence began their tour to promote the album with a concert at War Memorial Auditorium in Nashville, Tennessee, on August 17, 2011. This was followed by performances at Rock on the Range in Winnipeg on August 20, Rock in Rio on October 2 and at the José Miguel Agrelot Coliseum in Puerto Rico on October 6. The band began the first US leg of their tour on October 10 in Oakland, California, and finished it in New York City. Evanescence then played several concerts in the United Kingdom, beginning at London's Hammersmith Apollo on November 4 and finishing the leg on November 13 at the O2 Academy Birmingham. Supported by The Pretty Reckless, Fair to Midland and Rival Sons, the tour's set list included songs from Evanescence's three albums. Lee said, "We're definitely focusing mainly on the new material. We're really excited about that music the most – obviously it's the newest – but of course we'll be playing some from both of our other albums too. I guess I'd say in general, our show's on the heavy-energy side, so we'll be running around singing a lot of fast songs."

The Evanescence Tour continued in 2012 with concerts in the United States, Asia and Europe, including Lisboa V in Portugal and Rock am Ring in Germany. Their South American tour began on October 4 in Porto Alegre, Brazil, and the band returned to the UK for four shows in November. Evanescence also played on the Carnival of Madness tour with Halestorm, Cavo, New Medicine and Chevelle. That tour began on July 31, 2012, at the Prairie Capital Convention Center in Springfield, Illinois and ended on September 2 at the Outer Harbor in Buffalo, New York.

=== Singles ===
"What You Want", the album's first single, was released digitally on August 9, 2011. The song's lyrics are about freedom, one of Evanescence's themes. It debuted at number one on the UK Rock Chart, making Evanescence the artist with the most number-one singles on the chart in 2011. "What You Want" peaked at numbers 68 and 72 on the Billboard Hot 100 and UK Singles Chart, respectively. Its video, filmed in a Brooklyn, New York warehouse on July 30, 2011 with the band performing the song live, was directed by Meiert Avis and released on September 13.

"My Heart Is Broken" was distributed to hot, modern and adult-contemporary radio stations on October 31, 2011 and to pop stations the following day as the album's first mainstream single. Its video was released in January 2012, and the song was distributed to alternative and modern-rock stations on February 13. The next mainstream single, "Lost in Paradise", was released internationally on May 25. Its video, released on February 14, 2013, focuses on Evanescence's tour with footage of the band performing the song filmed by fans around the world. "The Other Side" was a promotional single which was distributed to modern-rock stations on June 11 and alternative stations the following day. Although a lyric video was uploaded to the band's YouTube channel on August 30, 2012, Lee said that no other video would be made for the song.

== Critical reception ==
Professional ratings
Aggregate scores
| Source | Rating |
|---|---|
| Metacritic | 63/100 |
Review scores
| Source | Rating |
| AllMusic | 3/5 stars |
| Digital Spy | 4/5 stars |
| Entertainment Weekly | B |
| The Gazette | 3.5/5 stars |
| IGN | 8/10 |
| Kerrang! | 5/5 stars |
| Los Angeles Times | 2.5/4 stars |
| Rolling Stone | 2.5/5 stars |
| Spin | 5/10 |
| USA Today | 2.5/4 stars |

According to the review aggregator Metacritic, Evanescence received "generally favorable reviews" based on a weighted average score of 63 out of 100 from 9 critic scores. Steve Beebee of Kerrang! complimented the songwriting and the band's performance, and called the album "easily their most cohesive and confident work". Rick Florino of Artistdirect wrote that "there's a pronounced vitality surging through these twelve songs, rising from the band's willingness to go out on a musical limb" and they "manage to experiment while staying unshakably infectious". Montreal Gazette's Mark Lepage praised the album's musicality, calling it "one rolling, chugging, plangent epic."

Entertainment Weekly's Kyle Anderson wrote, "When [Lee] uses baroque orchestral accoutrements to wage an air assault on her demons ... she's more than just the token girl in the pit." In Digital Spy, Lewis Corner said that outside of the electronic excursions Evanescence's "melodious rock sensibilities remain firmly in tact[sic]" and "we wouldn't want it any other way." IGN's Chad Grischow stated that Evanescence "delivers on the orchestral-laced hard rock thrust and Amy Lee's soaring vocals ... with a few surprising experiments along the way". Writing for Winnipeg Free Press, Rob Williams said the mix of musical styles "makes everything sound big and alive" and "with so many extra bells and whistles, despair has never sounded so epic." Theon Weber of Spin thought that Lee's performance was not restrained enough and "Evanescence gets lost in the cavernous spaces carved out by their unsecret weapon." Nick Catucci of Rolling Stone said that Lee "remains one of hard rock’s leading ladies" but he did not find the album's "sometimes syrupy mix of piano, guitar and strings" to be as cathartic or "saucy" as Evanescence's previous album.

Edna Gundersen of USA Today wrote that when "tempered, [Lee's] emotional wail enhances the hypnotic medieval magic of signature Evanescence tunes. Some electronics slip into the mix, but the band's rock essence and penchant for weepy strings remain prominent, as does its flair for conveying wretched despair." PopMatters' Dane Prokofiev disliked much of the rock-driven music, but praised Lee's voice and a "noticeable increase in the prominence of choir singing, tinkling piano motifs, and the silky sound of string instruments" toward symphonic metal. Steven Hyden of The A.V. Club dismissed the album as "narcissistic" and "grim and humorless". In The Boston Globe, Marc Hirsh wrote that Lee and the rest of the band found "creative foil" with each other and the album captures "each party elevating the other far above where their proclivities would get them on their own." AllMusic's Stephen Thomas Erlewine praised Raskulinecz's production and the album having "some shade and light" and "variety of tempos, enough to give Evanescence the illusion of warmth, not to mention a fair share of crossover hooks." Writing for Los Angeles Times, Mikael Wood said that while he had preferred a "livelier" album, Evanescence has standouts of "pain-soaked pleasure" and "ice-queen sarcasm" and "Lee hasn't lost her faith in goth-metal melodrama." NME complimented its heaviness and minimal ballads. Guitar World's Scott Iwasaki wrote that the album infuses classical music and 1990s influences and "brings Evanescence to a new level". Metal Hammer listed it as one of the 50 best metal albums of the 2010s, praising the band's stylistic fusion and pairing with Raskulinecz, and deeming the album "sturdy and slick". Kerrang! ranked it at number 11 on its list of the best albums of the year, and defined it as "their richest, most diverse body of work to date".

== Commercial performance ==
What can I say, we're thrilled about it! We made an album that we're really proud of and now we get to watch it fly. We weren't expecting this and we're just so grateful to our fans.

— Amy Lee, on the album's commercial success

Evanescence debuted at number one on the Billboard 200 with first-week sales of 127,000 copies, becoming the band's second album to debut atop the chart. The first week's sales were lower than those for Evanescence's previous album, The Open Door, which sold 447,000 copies in its first week. The album fell to number four the following week, selling over 40,000 copies. Evanescence also topped the Digital Albums, Top Rock Albums, Alternative Albums, and Hard Rock Albums charts in the United States, and was 2011's 141st best-selling album in that country. As of August 2012, Evanescence had sold 421,000 copies in the US. On December 9, 2020, the album was certified gold by the Recording Industry Association of America (RIAA) for shipments of over 500,000 units.

The album sold more than 2,000 copies on its first day of sales in the United Kingdom and debuted at number four on the UK Albums Chart with 26,221 copies sold in its first week. It was certified gold by the British Phonographic Industry (BPI) on August 22, 2014, denoting shipments in excess of 100,000 copies. The album entered the Canadian Albums Chart at number two, selling 9,000 copies in its first week. On January 12, 2012, the album was certified gold by Music Canada for shipments of over 40,000 units in Canada. Evanescence debuted and peaked at number five in Australia, was certified gold by the Australian Recording Industry Association (ARIA) for shipments of over 35,000 copies.

== Track listing ==
All tracks are written by Evanescence, except where noted.

| No. | Title | Length |
|---|---|---|
| 1. | "What You Want" | 3:41 |
| 2. | "Made of Stone" (Evanescence, William B. Hunt) | 3:32 |
| 3. | "The Change" | 3:42 |
| 4. | "My Heart Is Broken" | 4:29 |
| 5. | "The Other Side" | 4:05 |
| 6. | "Erase This" | 3:55 |
| 7. | "Lost in Paradise" (Lee) | 4:42 |
| 8. | "Sick" (Evanescence, B. Hunt) | 3:30 |
| 9. | "End of the Dream" (Evanescence, B. Hunt) | 3:49 |
| 10. | "Oceans" | 3:38 |
| 11. | "Never Go Back" | 4:27 |
| 12. | "Swimming Home" (Evanescence, B. Hunt) | 3:43 |
| Total length: | | 47:15 |

Japanese edition bonus track
| No. | Title | Length |
|---|---|---|
| 13. | "The Last Song I'm Wasting on You" (originally appeared as a B-side to "Lithium") (Lee) | 4:07 |
| Total length: | | 51:22 |

Deluxe edition bonus tracks
| No. | Title | Length |
|---|---|---|
| 13. | "New Way to Bleed" | 3:46 |
| 14. | "Say You Will" | 3:43 |
| 15. | "Disappear" | 3:07 |
| 16. | "Secret Door" (Evanescence, B. Hunt) | 3:53 |
| Total length: | | 61:44 |

iTunes Store deluxe edition pre-order bonus track
| No. | Title | Length |
|---|---|---|
| 17. | "What You Want" (Elder Jepson Remix) | 3:18 |
| Total length: | | 65:02 |

Deluxe edition bonus DVD
| No. | Title | Length |
|---|---|---|
| 1. | "What You Want" (music video) | 3:41 |
| 2. | "Making the What You Want Music Video – Day 1" | 6:43 |
| 3. | "Making the What You Want Music Video – Day 2" | 10:05 |
| 4. | "Behind the Scenes – In the Studio" | 8:25 |
| 5. | "Behind the Scenes at the Photoshoot" | 3:03 |
| 6. | "On the Songs" | 8:41 |
| Total length: | | 40:38 |

== Personnel ==
Credits adapted from the liner notes of Evanescence.

Evanescence

- Amy Lee – vocals, piano, keyboards, harp
- Terry Balsamo – guitar
- Troy McLawhorn – guitar
- Tim McCord – bass
- Will Hunt – drums

Additional musicians

- Chris Vrenna – programming, additional keyboards
- William B. Hunt – additional programming on "Swimming Home"
- David Campbell – string consultant
- Antoine Silverman – concertmaster
- Maxim Moston – violin
- Claire Chan – violin
- Suzy Perelman – violin
- Michael Roth – violin
- Sarah Pratt – violin
- Hiroko Taguchi – violin, viola
- Jonathan Dinklage – violin, viola
- Entcho Todorov – violin
- Dave Eggar – cello
- Anja Wood – cello
- Claire Bryant – cello
- Pete Donovan – bass

Technical

- Nick Raskulinecz – production
- Paul Fig – engineering
- Nathan Yarborough – engineering assistance
- Randy Staub – mixing
- Zach Blackstone – mix assistance
- Ted Jensen – mastering
- Phyllis Sparks – harp technician
- Mike Simmons – guitar technician, bass technician
- John Nicholson – drum technician
- Antoine Silverman – contractor

Artwork

- Michelle Lukianovich – art direction, package design
- Amy Lee – art direction, package design
- Chapman Baehler – photography

== Charts ==
=== Weekly charts ===
2011 weekly chart performance for Evanescence
| Chart (2011) | Peak position |
|---|---|
| Argentine Albums (CAPIF) | 9 |
| Australian Albums (ARIA) | 5 |
| Austrian Albums (Ö3 Austria) | 4 |
| Belgian Albums (Ultratop Flanders) | 12 |
| Belgian Albums (Ultratop Wallonia) | 9 |
| Canadian Albums (Billboard) | 2 |
| Czech Albums (ČNS IFPI) | 3 |
| Danish Albums (Hitlisten) | 22 |
| Dutch Albums (Album Top 100) | 14 |
| Finnish Albums (Suomen virallinen lista) | 14 |
| French Albums (SNEP) | 8 |
| German Albums (Offizielle Top 100) | 5 |
| Greek Albums (IFPI) | 1 |
| Irish Albums (IRMA) | 17 |
| Italian Albums (FIMI) | 5 |
| Japanese Albums (Oricon) | 8 |
| Mexican Albums (Top 100 Mexico) | 17 |
| New Zealand Albums (RMNZ) | 3 |
| Norwegian Albums (VG-lista) | 19 |
| Polish Albums (ZPAV) | 32 |
| Portuguese Albums (AFP) | 12 |
| Russian Albums (2M) | 24 |
| Scottish Albums (Official Charts) | 4 |
| Spanish Albums (Promusicae) | 10 |
| Swedish Albums (Sverigetopplistan) | 16 |
| Swiss Albums (Schweizer Hitparade) | 4 |
| UK Albums (Official Charts) | 4 |
| UK Rock & Metal Albums (Official Charts) | 1 |
| US Billboard 200 | 1 |
| US Top Alternative Albums (Billboard) | 1 |
| US Top Hard Rock Albums (Billboard) | 1 |
| US Top Rock Albums (Billboard) | 1 |

2020 weekly chart performance for Evanescence
| Chart (2020) | Peak position |
|---|---|
| Slovak Albums (ČNS IFPI) | 83 |

=== Year-end charts ===
2011 year-end chart performance for Evanescence
| Chart (2011) | Position |
|---|---|
| French Albums (SNEP) | 190 |
| German Albums (Offizielle Top 100) | 68 |
| Swiss Albums (Schweizer Hitparade) | 49 |
| UK Albums (OCC) | 176 |
| US Billboard 200 | 141 |
| US Top Alternative Albums (Billboard) | 18 |
| US Top Hard Rock Albums (Billboard) | 9 |
| US Top Rock Albums (Billboard) | 25 |

2012 year-end chart performance for Evanescence
| Chart (2012) | Position |
|---|---|
| US Billboard 200 | 159 |
| US Top Alternative Albums (Billboard) | 29 |
| US Top Hard Rock Albums (Billboard) | 11 |
| US Top Rock Albums (Billboard) | 47 |

== Certifications ==
Certifications for Evanescence
| Region | Certification | Certified units/sales |
|---|---|---|
| Australia (ARIA) | Gold | 35,000^{^} |
| Canada (Music Canada) | Gold | 40,000^{^} |
| United Kingdom (BPI) | Gold | 130,000 |
| United States (RIAA) | Gold | 500,000^{‡} |
^{^} Shipments figures based on certification alone.^{‡} Sales+streaming figures based on certification alone.

== Release history ==
Release dates and formats for Evanescence
| Region | Date | Format | Label |
|---|---|---|---|
| Australia | October 7, 2011 | CD; digital download | Universal |
| Germany | October 7, 2011 | CD; digital download | Wind-up |
| Ireland | October 7, 2011 | CD; digital download | Virgin |
| United Kingdom | October 10, 2011 | CD; digital download | Virgin |
| Poland | October 10, 2011 | CD; digital download | Wind-up |
| France | October 10, 2011 | CD; digital download | EMI |
| Denmark | October 10, 2011 | CD; digital download | Capitol |
| Netherlands | October 10, 2011 | CD; digital download | Universal |
| United States | October 11, 2011 | CD; digital download | Wind-up |
| Italy | October 11, 2011 | CD; digital download | Virgin |
| Canada | October 11, 2011 | CD; digital download | EMI |
| Finland | October 12, 2011 | CD; digital download | EMI |
| Japan | October 12, 2011 | CD; digital download | EMI |
| Sweden | October 12, 2011 | CD; digital download | Wind-up |
| Mexico | October 25, 2011 | CD; digital download | Wind-up |
| China | March 1, 2012 | CD; digital download | Starsign |
