= What You Want (Evanescence song) =

2011 song by Evanescence

Single by Evanescence

from the album Evanescence
- Released: August 9, 2011
- Recorded: 2010–2011 (New York City)
- Genre: Industrial rock; nu metal; gothic rock
- Length: 3:40
- Label: Wind-up
- Songwriters: Amy Lee; Terry Balsamo; Tim McCord
- Producer: Nick Raskulinecz

Evanescence singles chronology
"Good Enough" (2007)	"What You Want" (2011)	"My Heart Is Broken" (2011)

Music video
- "What You Want" on YouTube

"What You Want" is a song by American rock band Evanescence. It was released as the lead single from the band's third eponymous album on August 9, 2011 through Wind-up Records. The song was written by Amy Lee, Terry Balsamo and Tim McCord and produced by Nick Raskulinecz. Lee described "What You Want" as a departure from the band's previous sound and said she was inspired to write the song by several experiences she had with her fans. Musically "What You Want" contains a variety of musical elements and it uses drums, guitars, synthesizers and a piano. Lyrically, the song has a theme of freedom.

Upon its release, "What You Want" received positive reviews from music critics who praised its instrumentation, Lee's vocals and the song's musical hook; several of them listed it as an album highlight. The song peaked at number 68 on the US Billboard Hot 100 and achieved higher success in its component charts. It also peaked at number 55 on the Canadian Hot 100, topped the UK Rock Chart and appeared in eight charts in different countries.

The music video for "What You Want" was filmed in Brooklyn, New York and it was directed by Meiert Avis and Stefan Smith. It shows the band performing the song live in a small warehouse and Lee running in various locations. The video received positive response from critics who generally praised the imagery. "What You Want" was performed live for the first time on MTV and later on Jimmy Kimmel Live!. It was added to the set list of the band's third world tour, Evanescence Tour (2011-2012).

== Background and recording ==
"What it really means is, 'I'm all the chaos and all the things you can't control in your life, but don't be afraid of it, because that's how it's always going to be.' You can't be too afraid to go live and take what you want out of life. You can't control all the crazy stuff that happens to you. All you can control is the way you handle it."

— Amy Lee talking about "What You Want"

"What You Want" was written by Amy Lee, Terry Balsamo, and Tim McCord in New York City and the production was handled by Nick Raskulinecz. During an interview with MTV News in June, Lee talked about the song saying, "[...] the song that I think is the first single is the song that wraps it all up. It's got a cool meaning, a lot of great lyrics going on, it also just smacks you right in the face and it's heavy and it's great." She noted that the song was a departure from the band's previous material and acknowledged that they wanted the new single to be "more than a hit".

Lee stated the song was inspired by and talked about her relationship with the band's fans, and the realization that following a music career "is what I'm supposed to do". She also explained that the theme of the song was freedom, saying that the song's lyric "Remember who you really are" was "exactly everything you could assume it means". Another inspiration for the song came from Lee's life, "That song is me talking to myself about not being afraid and coming back to this thing and living the life I was born to live. Sometimes, it takes a lot to do this. And I do love it very much, but there is always that fear of putting yourself under the microscope."

Speaking about the sound, Lee described "What You Want" as "very danceable" and her own vocals as "fun and snappy and it gives a cool dynamic [to the song]". Lee stated that the process of recording the song was fun for the band as they had excess time. She said that initially the song was conceived while the band was just recording demo, but as time passed it progressed and grew into something more. She wrote a chorus for "What You Want" and played it on the piano. Lee revealed that she was initially embarrassed when she came up with the lyrics and the melody of the song as she thought the members of her band would think she was Janet Jackson due to the usage of a hook. During an interview with M Music & Musicians Lee revealed that she wouldn't have recorded the song if it had been brought to her before the recording of Evanescence as she would have thought it was "stupid".

== Release ==
On August 22, 2011 Lee went to Toronto's Liberty Studios, to preview 5 mastered songs from Evanescence to a selected crowd of thirty people. "What You Want" was one of the five previewed songs. A snippet of "What You Want" premiered on MTV on July 11, 2011. During that time it was reported that the band's new single would be released in early August. After the performance by the band on MTV on August 8, 2011, the album version premiered on the channel's official website. The song was digitally released on August 9, 2011 exclusively on the iTunes Store, and to all other digital retailers on August 16. In the United Kingdom, the song was released on August 21, and a CD single of the song was released on September 9, 2011 in Germany. The band revealed during an interview that there were a lot of songs they were planning to release as the album's first single, but it was a "natural choice" to release "What You Want". To promote the single, the band partnered with SoundTracking and GetGlue. Fans who identified an Evanescence song using the SoundTracking application and shared it to Twitter, using the hashtag #Evcomeback, entered themselves to win an album from the band. If fans checked into Evanescence using GetGlue, they unlocked an exclusive sticker.

The song was well received by the band's fans. After James Montgomery from MTV News showed the snippets of the song, he asked the fans on Twitter to share their opinions about it. According to the fans' tweets, the new songs were well received and praised. Kara Klenk of the same publication also confirmed the positive reception adding, "In the fast-paced music world where artists need to constantly reinvent themselves and pump out music, videos, appearances, and tours to keep their fans happy and interested, it's rare for a band to take a multi-year hiatus and come back to legions of fans who have anxiously awaited their return."

== Composition ==
"What You Want" contains a variety of musical elements and influences of several music genres: industrial rock, gothic pop, nu metal, classic synth-pop, electro-pop dance and baroque metal along with a pop hook. Several critics noted that some of the gothic and metal elements were prominent in the band's previous material, mostly due to their songs' piano-driven melody. Lewis Corner of the website Digital Spy noted that the classical strings present in the song reinforced the band's medieval influences. Dane Prokofiev of PopMatters further compared the song with Korn's music while Rick Florino of Artistdirect noted similarities to works by Depeche Mode. The song's beat was further described as dynamic, "slamming" and loud. As the song progresses, the melody goes through "dramatic crashes" and crescendos.

"What You Want" opens with rapid drums and soon moves into a guitar-driven mode, accompanied by synthesizers. Throughout the song, Lee uses "pseudo operatic" and "poppy" vocals. In the opening lines, she sings: "Do what you, what you want / If you have a dream for better / Do what you, what you want / 'Til you don't want it anymore." Those sounds are followed by a hard rock surging guitar and strings which were noted to be part of the band's characteristic sound. The chorus is instrumentally complete with crashing cymbals, "thrashing, high-wired rawk" guitars, electric guitars, keyboards and piano as Lee sings, "Hello, hello, remember me? I’m everything you can’t control / Somewhere beyond the pain there must be a way to believe we can break through." At the end of the song, Lee shouts the hook "Do what you, what you want," as her vocals are echoed and eventually fade away. Laurie Tuffrey of NME summarized the song as a "standard goth-pop fare, full of rapid drum breaks, swathes of fuzzy riffing and a catchy, chant-friendly chorus." Overally, Scott Shetler of Pop Crush described its production as "polished".

Several critics interpreted the song's lyrics during their reviews. Its theme was noted to be about freedom. Jason Lipshutz of Billboard said that in the song, Lee is "trying to convince a romantic partner to stop 'spiraling down, down, down' and help her find a new beginning." Kerrang! writer Steve Beebee wrote that Lee reaches a conclusion that "Love will guide you home." Talking about the lyrical content of the song, Laurie Tuffrey of NME opined: "It's quite hard to tell what the song's about, with lots of references to 'the unknown' and 'the pain', and it confusingly switches between suggesting people 'do what you want you want, if you have a dream for better' in the first verse and the decidedly creepier final chorus where Lee seemingly gets an ex-lover on the blower, only to tell them 'Hello, hello, it’s only me, infecting everything you love'."

== Critical reception ==
Scott Shetler of Pop Crush described the song as a "forceful rock track that reminds fans why the group was one of the most successful crossover acts of the past decade" and praised Lee's "strong-but-pretty vocals". James Montgomery from MTV News, praised the song saying that the "elastic-yet-lock-step energy not only makes the song the perfect comeback single for a band that's been gone for far too long, but it manages to capture the very essence of what inspired them to press on." Tom Goodwyn of the same publication wrote: "A big thumping drumbeat and driving guitar riff kick things off, before giving way to a stomping chorus written with NFL stadiums in mind." Karen Bliss of the magazine Rolling Stone praised Lee's "haunting" and "crystalline" vocals in the "industrial-strength sound" of "What You Want". Nick Catucci of the same publication gave the song three stars writing, "Amy Lee trades anguish for defiance, goosing her wail with welcome sass. Still, she's nearly overrun by the music, a collision of two-ton guitars, strings and piano." Steven Hyden of The A.V. Club wrote: "Lee really can sing, and the opener 'What You Want' shows she has the pipes (and even the submerged spunk) to become the new Pat Benatar this generation desperately needs." Rick Florino of Artistdirect gave the song five out of five stars praising the hook as one of the best in the band's career adding that it managed to make the song "instantly unforgettable". Florino further called the song "another classic from Evanescence" which will "revive rock music again" and concluded:

At the heart of this epic, Lee relays another personal story that impacts intensely, especially as the song breaks during the bridge and her voice takes flight like never before. Lyrics like 'Somewhere beyond the pain there must be a way to believe' sear and soar, as Lee continues to hypnotize like no other singer in rock or pop for that matter.

While reviewing Evanescence as a whole, Catucci of Rolling Stone called the song "pummeling but pretty." In another review for the same publication, Matthew Perpetua wrote that the "heaviness is less top-heavy" in the song before adding that the band "never sounded so brisk and dynamic". Camille Dodero of the same publication called "What You Want" a "hair-blowingly grandiose" song. Melissa Maerz of Entertainment Weekly gave the song a B rating and said, "the song's grinding guitars, massive drums, goth-princess piano frills, and warrior-grrrl vocal rage feel like 2007 all over again." Melinda Newman of HitFix praised the chorus lines saying that it should have been chosen as a theme song for the film Contagion.

Robert Copsey of Digital Spy described the song as a "hefty slab of dramatic rock which includes the band's trademark electric guitars with melodic choruses". In another review, he awarded the song four stars out of five stating "electro it certainly ain't, but the result is as dancefloor-friendly as it is mosh pit-ready." He further praised the "catchy-as-cholera" chorus and gave a mixed review about the lyrics and the title saying "fortunately their words seemed to have been a touch overzealous; though it's clear from the trailer for the group's third album that they've been spending a night or two on the tiles." Lewis Corner of the same publication concluded: "'What You Want' proved... the band's melodious rock sensibilities remain firmly in tact [sic]". Tamar Anitai of MTV, Theon Weber of Spin, Stephen Thomas Erlewine of Allmusic and Edna Gundersen of USA Today chose the song as an album highlight. Entertainment Weekly's Kyle Anderson also chose it as a highlight, further describing it as "fierce". Los Angeles Times' Mikael Wood wrote that "'What You Want' rides its central riff with a bulldozer's efficiency." Marc Hirsh of The Boston Globe found a "metallic lurch playing off of Lee's goth-empress vocals" in the song. Hirsh went on to call the song a "strong declaration" announcing the band's comeback.

In 2011, Loudwire ranked the song number four on its list of the 10 greatest Evanescence songs, and in 2020, Kerrang ranked the song number ten on its list of the 20 greatest Evanescence songs.

== Chart performance ==
On the chart issue dated August 20, 2011, "What You Want" debuted at number 68 on the Billboard Hot 100 chart, selling more than 78,000 copies according to SoundScan. The song also debuted at number 32 on the Billboard Rock Songs becoming the "Greatest Gainer" of the week on the same chart. Later, during the digital release of Evanescence, it moved from number 15 to number 13. It debuted at number 35 on the Billboard Alternative Songs chart in the United States while also peaking at number 7 on the Billboard Mainstream Rock Chart. As of November 2011, it has sold more than 112,000 digital downloads. On the Canadian Hot 100, "What You Want" debuted at number 55.

"What You Want" peaked at number 30 on the Brazilian Billboard Brasil chart on August 12, 2011. On August 22, 2011, the song debuted on the German Singles Chart and peaked at number 84. It charted for three weeks and left the chart on October 2, 2011. On September 3, the song debuted at number one on the UK Rock Chart, removing Evanescence's own single "My Immortal" (2003) from the top spot. That achievement helped the song debut at number 72 on the main UK Singles Chart the same day. "What You Want" debuted at number 86 on the ARIA Singles Chart in Australia on April 2, 2012. According to the ARIA Charts' official website, the song debuted in April, though it was released in Australia in August 2011.

== Music video ==
=== Background and development ===
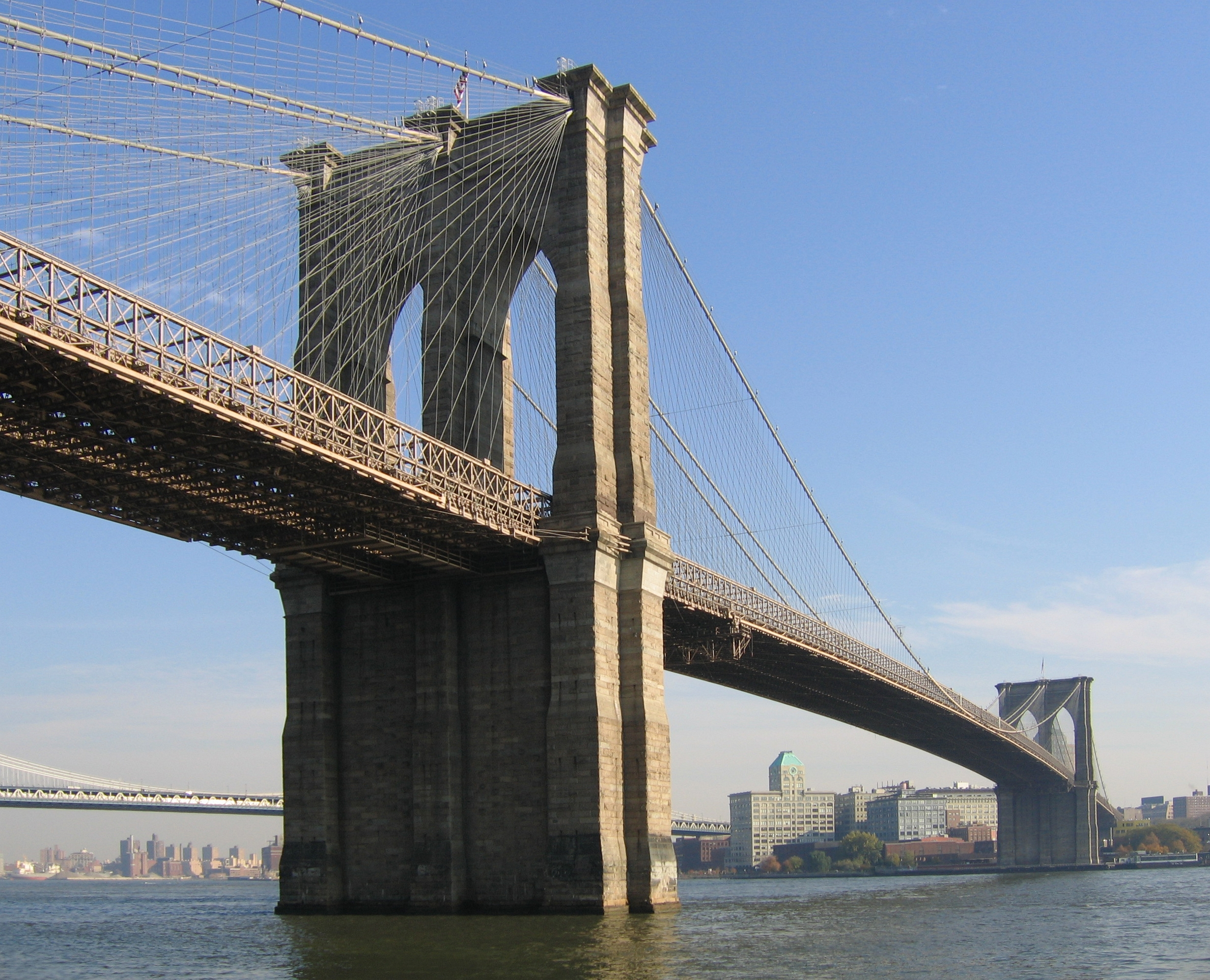
The music video for the song was filmed in Brooklyn, New York and shows several shots of the Brooklyn Bridge.

The filming of the music video for "What You Want" started on July 30, 2011 in a warehouse in Brooklyn, New York, and it produced by Jeremy Alter and was directed by Meiert Avis and Stefan Smith. The video featured the band's fans who played a crowd on a concert by Evanescence. During an interview, Lee revealed that the music video for the song was one of the band's "realest" videos adding, "[...] this is more a personal video. We've done a lot in the past that [were] very 'fantasy,' and this is sort of the real us.[...] I just wanted to do something that really felt personal for a change. Obviously, I'm wearing crazy makeup, and that's not my everyday, but, you know, I want ... to connect with the fans again. We all do. We miss them. A lot of this record is about them, and that's why they're going to be here and be in it, too." In an interview with MTV News, she described the concept of the video:

"This video is sort of, like, the history of the band. This club [set] is emulating old shows we used to play in the beginning — we used to play this club called Vino's in Little Rock [Arkansas] — it's sort of like back then, the gritty, dirty club, sweaty. And basically, it's also [about] New York, where I've been, [and] where [bassist] Tim [McCord] lived in the past few years since we've been gone. And it's sort of about escaping New York and.[...] coming back out into the world."

However, before the filming of the video, the band was still finishing the album and when the time to shoot the video came, Lee didn't conceive an idea about how it should look like. As she felt the song was different for the band, Lee knew that they didn't want to "go the classic, sort of fantastic, epic [thing]." Lee asked her sister Carrie to help her around the concept of the video. Her sister said that they should film the video for the song in New York and Lee agreed with her idea, "She just started saying things that were right on. She was like, 'This should be in New York. You guys need to do something different, this song feels different.' And she started talking about running across the Brooklyn Bridge, and it being where I live, and I was like, 'Oh my God, this is great.'" However, the final shot of the video filmed at Coney Island was Lee's own idea. The shot represented the band coming back in the world and "heading into the unknown, coming into a new world".

=== Synopsis ===
The video begins with shots of several skyscrapers in New York, which are followed by scenes of the band performing in a warehouse that has been converted into a stage (similar to Vino's bar which is where the band used to regularly perform before they became popular). The crowd at the concert is seen singing along with the band. The video continually cuts the singer walking through Brooklyn in a dark dress and makeup. She walks through a train station, streets and the Brooklyn Bridge. During the bridge of the song, Lee runs through the Brooklyn Bridge and jumps on the other side, landing on her feet. At the end of the video, the band meet up and walk to the beach where they walk into the sea. The final shot shows the band walking in the sea as the video fades out.

=== Release and reception ===
A twenty-two second teaser of the video was released on September 9, 2011. The video for the song officially premiered online on September 13, 2011 and it was made available for digital download on the iTunes Store the same day. James Montgomery from MTV News, said that the video was a departure for the band "eschewing the dark fantasy worlds they've created in previous videos in favor of good old-fashioned realism: the blood, sweat and tears that not only took them to the top, but have fueled their current comeback, too." Later, he added that the video "recalls the halcyon days of big-ticket rock videos" and some "claustrophobic, cathartic performance footage." Entertainment Weekly's Grady Smith, called the video "heavy goth-rock head-banger" and added that the shots of Lee falling from the bridge were similar to the music video for "Bring Me to Life" (2003).

Melinda Newman of the website HitFix compared the video with the movies The Crow (1994) and Run Lola Run (1998). She further praised the lighting, the photographs and the mood which according to her, were "perfection, especially the city scapes at night and the intense looks on the fans faces, as they are enraptured by Lee. It's a big budget shoot, the kind we don't see that much of anymore." Jason Lipshutz of the magazine Billboard praised the video with its "crystal-clear" shots of the concert and the "hazy" shots of Lee running through New York. Nicole James of MTV Buzzyworthy simply said "rock videos + themes = the only kind of math I like" referring to the music video for "What You Want". A more negative review of the video was given by Laurie Tuffrey of NME who called the video "uninspiring". He further found CCTV effects and concluded that Lee was "looking for some love to infect" while running through Brooklyn streets.

== Live performances ==
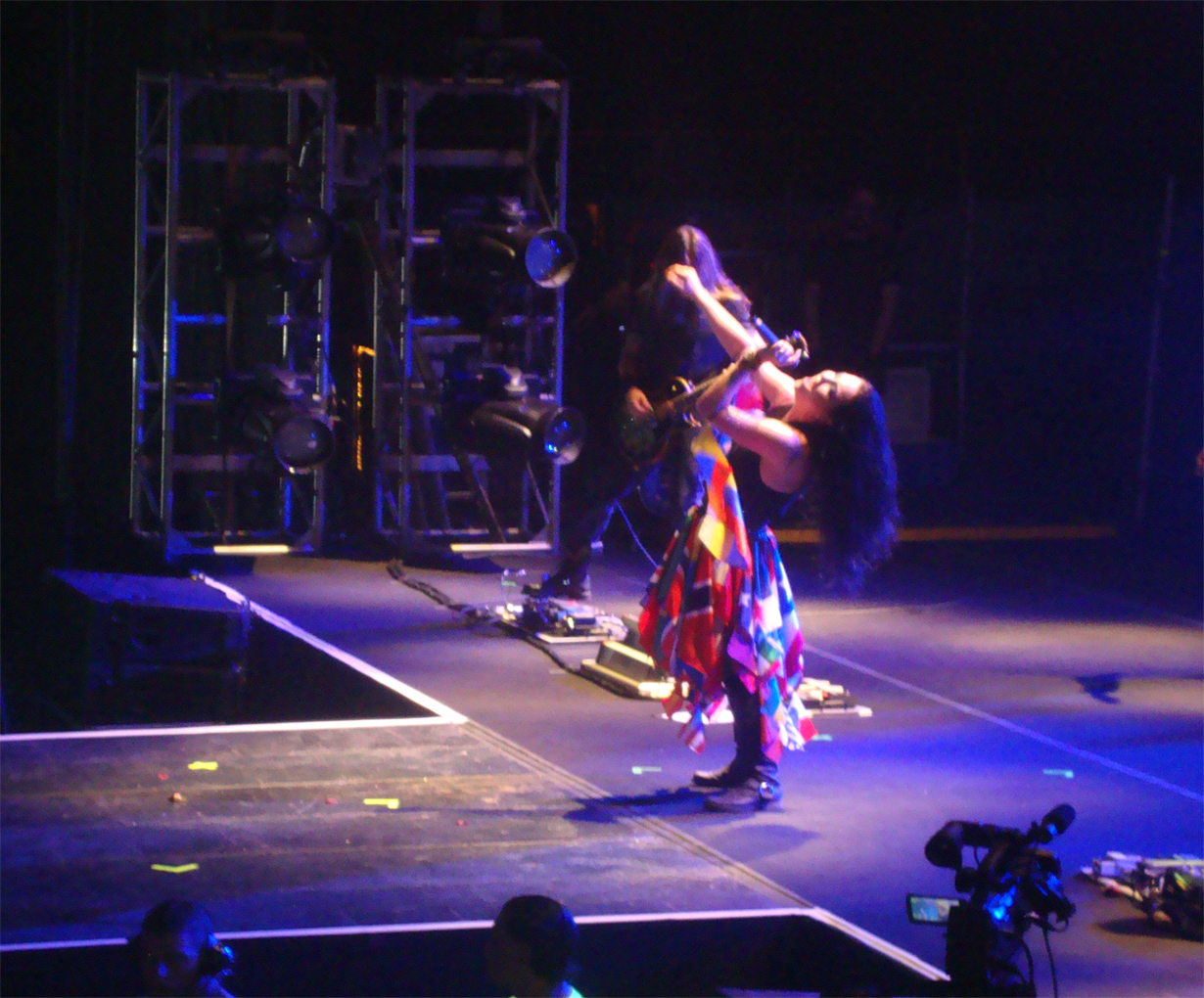
Amy Lee performing "What You Want" in Costa Rica during the Evanescence Tour on October 30, 2012

Evanescence performed the song live for the first time on MTV, on August 8, 2011 during a broadcast called MTV First: Evanescence. After the performance the band had an exclusive interview with the publication. Writing for the channel's website, James Montgomery described Lee's vocals as "powerful" during the performance. On October 15, 2011, Evanescence performed the song during a televised appearance on the Jimmy Kimmel Live! show.

They later added the song to the set list on their third worldwide tour in support of Evanescence, titled Evanescence Tour. While reviewing a concert by the band, Rick Florino of Artistdirect wrote that Lee sounded "pristine and powerful" during the chorus of the song. He further praised Tim McCord's bass and Terry Balsamo's guitar, "volleying with Troy McLawhorn as Evanescene's methodical metallic theatrics hypnotized." He concluded that the song "proved to be an undeniable anthem echoed throughout the room by every voice present." Evanescence performed the song during their concert at the 2011 Rock in Rio festival on October 2, 2011.

== Track listing ==
Digital download

1. "What You Want" – 3:40

CD single

1. "What You Want" – 3:40
2. "What You Want" (Elder Jepson Remix) – 3:18

== Charts ==
=== Weekly charts ===
Chart (2011–2012)	Peak position
Australia (ARIA)	86
Brazil (Billboard)	30
Canada Hot 100 (Billboard)	55
Canada Rock (Billboard)	23
Czech Republic (Modern Rock)	9
Germany (Media Control Charts)	84
Italy (FIMI)	86
Japan (Japan Hot 100)	52
South Korea (Gaon Chart)	59
UK Singles (Official Charts)	72
UK Rock & Metal (OCC)	1
US Billboard Hot 100	68
US Alternative Airplay (Billboard)	14
US Hot Rock & Alternative Songs (Billboard)	11
US Mainstream Rock (Billboard)	8
US Rock & Alternative Airplay (Billboard)	11
Venezuela Record Report (Top 100)	183

=== Year-end charts ===
Chart (2012)	Position
US Hot Rock & Alternative Songs (Billboard)	92

== Certifications ==
Region	Certification	Certified units/sales
Brazil (Pro-Música Brasil)	Gold	30,000^{‡}
^{‡} Sales+streaming figures based on certification alone.

== Release history ==
Country	Date	Format
Australia	August 9, 2011	Digital download
Austria	August 9, 2011	Digital download
Belgium	August 9, 2011	Digital download
Denmark	August 9, 2011	Digital download
Finland	August 9, 2011	Digital download
France	August 9, 2011	Digital download
Germany	August 9, 2011	Digital download
Greece	August 9, 2011	Digital download
Italy	August 9, 2011	Digital download
Mexico	August 9, 2011	Digital download
Netherlands	August 9, 2011	Digital download
Norway	August 9, 2011	Digital download
Portugal	August 9, 2011	Digital download
Spain	August 9, 2011	Digital download
Sweden	August 9, 2011	Digital download
Switzerland	August 9, 2011	Digital download
United States	August 9, 2011	Digital download
New Zealand	August 9, 2011	Digital download
Germany	September 9, 2011	CD single
United Kingdom	October 2, 2011	Digital download

== See also ==
- List of UK Rock Chart number-one singles of 2011
