= American Songwriter =

American music magazine

- May–June 2012 issue of American Songwriter featuring Tim McGraw
- Managing Editor: Dallas Jackson
- Senior Editor: Paul Zollo
- Editor in Chief: Lisa Konicki
- Categories: Music
- Frequency: Bimonthly
- Circulation: 30,000
- Publisher: Savage Media Holdings
- Founded: 1984
- Company: Savage Ventures
- Country: United States
- Based in: Nashville, Tennessee
- Language: English
- Website: americansongwriter.com
- ISSN: 0896-8993
- OCLC: 17342741

American Songwriter is an American bimonthly magazine covering songwriting. Established in 1984, it features interviews, songwriting tips, news, reviews and lyric contest. The magazine is based in Nashville, Tennessee.

== History ==
The American Songwriter staff concentrates on fulfilling the original objective of the magazine as set forth in the first issue in August 1984: producing an insightful, intellectually intriguing magazine about the art and stories of songwriting.

American Songwriter covers all musical genres. Over the years, issues have featured Garth Brooks, Bob Dylan, Poison, Clint Black, John Denver, Smokey Robinson, Wilco, Bon Jovi, Willie Nelson, Billy Joel, Kris Kristofferson, John Mellencamp, Richard Marx, Drive-By Truckers, Paul McCartney, Elton John, Beck, Dolly Parton, Eric Clapton, R.E.M., Weezer, Death Cab for Cutie, Ryan Adams, Jimmy Buffett, Merle Haggard, Rob Thomas, Toby Keith, Eddie Rabbitt, Roger Miller, Public Enemy, Sheryl Crow, James Taylor, Ray LaMontagne, Tom Petty, Neil Diamond, Zac Brown Band, Kings of Leon, Neil Young, My Morning Jacket, Taylor Swift and others.

In 2004, the magazine, previously published by Jim Sharp, was sold to an investment group based in Mobile, Alabama. In 2011, Albie Del Favero took over the reins, "joining the team as Co-Publisher, and President of its parent company ForASong Media, LLC. Del Favero’s extensive background in media includes being founding publisher of the Nashville Scene. More recently he served as Nashville-area group publisher at SouthComm, which currently owns The City Paper and the Nashville Scene." Since 2004, American Songwriter has grown from a 2,000 circulation to more than 30,000 as of November 2013, and claims a readership of approximately 90-95,000 per issue and 150-200,000 unique visitors to AmericanSongwriter.com each month. American Songwriter is distributed worldwide.

The magazine holds six bi-monthly lyric contests. The winner of each contest receives a new Gibson acoustic guitar, a Shure SM58 microphone, and a feature in the magazine. One annual grand-prize winner for the 2014 contest will win a co-writing session with Ashley Monroe, and get a chance to record a demo at a leading Nashville studio.

In 2019, American Songwriter was acquired by Savage Media.

A special section of the website, Songwriter U, focuses on the business of songwriting and includes articles on royalty collection, marketing, touring, guitar instruction and lyric technique.

Advertisers include national instrument manufacturers, record companies who want to gain exposure for their singer/songwriters and bands, publishers who honor writer achievements, demo studios, recording software and a select group of non-musical companies who are positioning their products within the musical culture.

== See also ==
- M Music & Musicians
