= Evanescence Tour =

2011–12 concert tour by Evanescence

- Tour by Evanescence
- The official poster used in October 2011
- Associated album: Evanescence
- Start date: August 17, 2011
- End date: November 9, 2012
- Legs: 8
- No. of shows: 64 in North America; 36 in Europe; 13 in Asia; 11 in South America; 6 in Oceania; 1 in Africa; 131 total

Evanescence concert chronology
- The Open Door Tour (2006–2007); Evanescence Tour (2011–2012); Synthesis Live (2017–2018)

The Evanescence Tour was the third worldwide concert tour by American rock band Evanescence. Staged in support of their 2011 eponymous third studio album, the tour began in August 2011 and ended in November 2012, with the band playing shows in North America, Europe, Asia, South America, Oceania, and Africa.

== Development ==
In July 2011, before the album's release, the band had several early tour dates scheduled, including Nashville, Tennessee in August, Brazil and Puerto Rico in October, and the UK in November. In an interview in August, Lee spoke about the tour, stating that tour rehearsal had not yet started as they were finishing the album track list, album art and mixes, and doing photo shoots and press runs. "Everything's just crammed really tight, from the video to the promo to the rehearsal." She also stated that the tour will be "straight-up rock. Big energy, this album is just a fast-paced rock ride", adding, "We're definitely focusing mainly on the new material. We're really excited about that music the most — obviously it's the newest — but of course we'll be playing some from both of our other albums too."

The band's concerts were supported by The Pretty Reckless, Fair to Midland, and Rival Sons. The Pretty Reckless singer Taylor Momsen stated she was a "big fan of Evanescence, so it's really exciting to be opening for them". During January 2012 rehearsal for upcoming shows, Lee told fans on Twitter that they could suggest songs to be included in the tour set list.

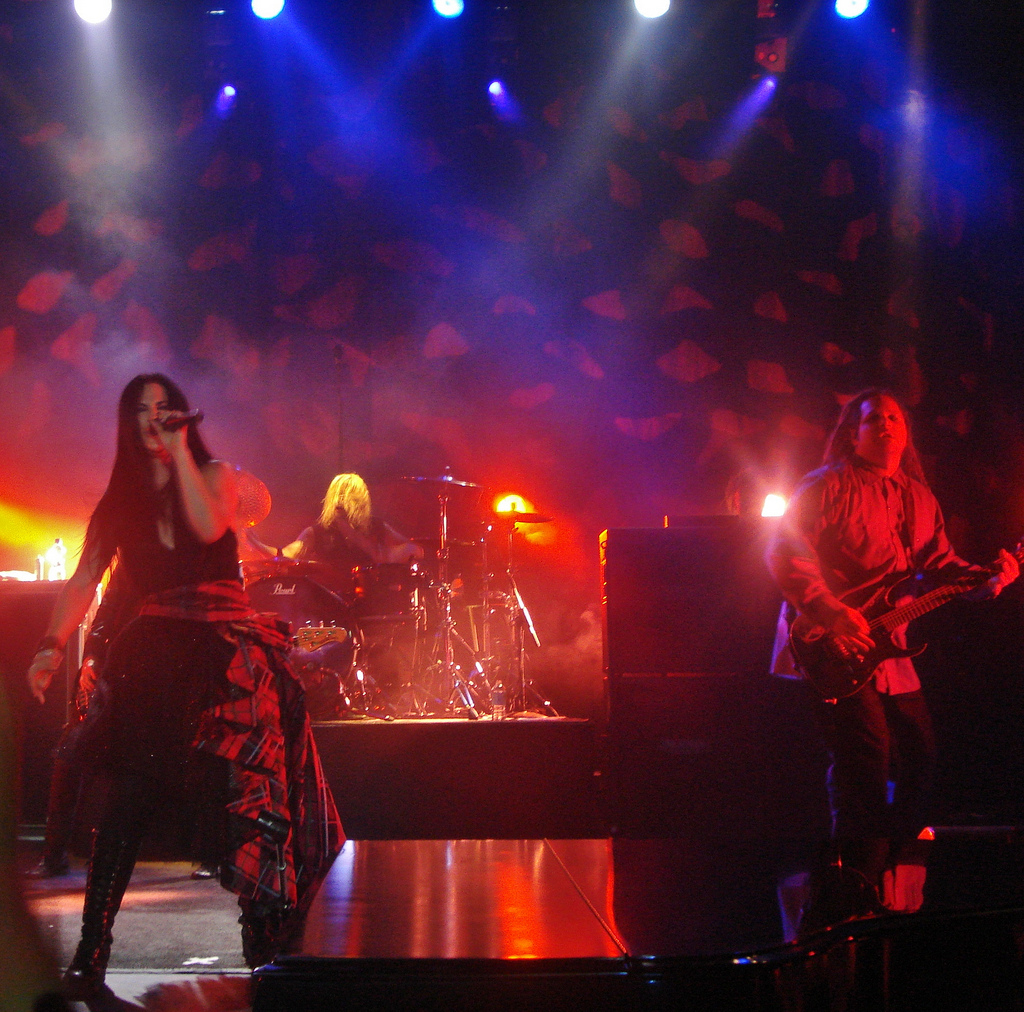
Evanescence performing in 2011

Evanescence began their tour in support of the album with a concert at War Memorial Auditorium in Nashville, Tennessee, on August 17, 2011. This was followed by performances at Rock on the Range in Winnipeg, Canada on August 20, Rock in Rio Brazil on October 2, and José Miguel Agrelot Coliseum in San Juan, Puerto Rico on October 6. The band kicked off the first leg of the tour in the US on October 10 in Oakland, California, finishing November 1 in New York City, before touring the UK and Europe. The UK tour started at London's Hammersmith Apollo on November 4 and ended on November 13 at the O_{2} Academy Birmingham. The Evanescence tour continued with concerts in the United States, Asia, South America, and Europe.

== Critical reception ==
Reviewing a Los Angeles show, Sophie A. Schillaci of The Hollywood Reporter praised the performances of the band and Lee's live vocals, writing, "Lee delivered with high energy and an undeniably fierce vocal style", but wished there was more banter between songs. Matt Elias of MTV called it an energetic show that kept the crowd engaged. Jon Pareles of The New York Times said that the band's "thrashing and roaring" and Lee's powerful voice culminated in a "wearying" but "virtuosic concert, exulting in sorrow, determination and thunderous impact." St. Louis Post-Dispatch's Kevin C. Johnson said the "brooding" music featured "Lee's distinct, aching wails to the band's trademark crunchy guitar chords that never seem to quit". The National's Abu Dhabi wrote that the band "put on a charged set that balanced their new tracks with crowd favourites" and Lee "was all dynamism". Joel Francis of The Kansas City Star stated that the band "relentlessly hammerd heavy riffs" and Lee "glided across the stage and sashayed over the cacophony, her voice simultaneously tempering and reinforcing the ferocity below", showing that Evanescence is "still not only a force to be reckoned with, but very much here to stay".

== Opening acts ==
- The Pretty Reckless
- Fair to Midland
- Rival Sons
- Electric Touch
- Blaqk Audio
- The Used
- LostAlone (UK Only)

== Setlist ==
Nashville and Winnipeg
1. "What You Want"
2. "Going Under"
3. "Weight of the World"
4. "The Only One"
5. "The Change"
6. "Lithium"
7. "Your Star"
8. "Whisper"
9. "Oceans"
10. "Call Me When You're Sober"
11. "Imaginary"
12. "Bring Me to Life"
13. "All That I'm Living For"
14. "Good Enough" (performed only on Nashville)
15. "My Immortal" (performed only on Nashville)
16. "The Other Side"
Rock in Rio (Brazil)
1. "What You Want"
2. "Going Under"
3. "The Other Side"
4. "Weight of the World"
5. "Made of Stone"
6. "My Immortal"
7. "My Heart Is Broken"
8. "Your Star"
9. "Sick"
10. "The Change"
11. "Call Me When You're Sober"
12. "Imaginary"
13. "Never Go Back" (included on the original set list, but was not performed)
14. "Bring Me to Life"
2011 US Tour

October 10, 2011 – November 21, 2011

1. "What You Want"
2. "Going Under"
3. "The Other Side"
4. "Weight of the World"
5. "The Change"
6. "Made of Stone"
7. "Lost in Paradise"
8. "My Heart Is Broken"
9. "Lithium"
10. "Sick"
11. "Oceans"
12. "Call Me When You're Sober"
13. "Imaginary"
14. "Bring Me to Life"

Encore

15. "Never Go Back"
16. "Your Star"
17. "My Immortal"
2012 setlist

January 13, 2012 onward

1. "What You Want"
2. "Going Under"
3. "The Other Side"
4. "Weight of the World"
5. "The Change"
6. "My Last Breath"
7. "Made of Stone"
8. "Lost in Paradise"
9. "My Heart Is Broken"
10. "Lithium"
11. "Erase This"
12. "Sick"
13. "Call Me When You're Sober"
14. "Imaginary"
15. "Bring Me to Life"

Encore

16. "Never Go Back"
17. "Swimming Home"
18. "Your Star"
19. "My Immortal"
Sydney
1. "What You Want"
2. "Going Under"
3. "The Other Side"
4. "Weight of the World"
5. "The Change"
6. "Made of Stone"
7. "Lost in Paradise"
8. "My Heart Is Broken"
9. "Lithium"
10. "Sweet Sacrifice"
11. "Call Me When You're Sober"
12. "Imaginary"
13. "Bring Me to Life"

Encore

14. "Swimming Home"
15. "Your Star"
16. "My Immortal"
Austin
1. "What You Want"
2. "Going Under"
3. "The Other Side"
4. "Weight of the World"
5. "Made of Stone"
6. "Lost in Paradise"
7. "My Heart Is Broken"
8. "Lithium"
9. "Sick"
10. "The Change"
11. "Call Me When You're Sober"
12. "Imaginary"
13. "Bring Me to Life"

Encore

14. "Your Star"
15. "My Immortal"
Rabat
1. "What You Want"
2. "Going Under"
3. "The Other Side"
4. "Weight of the World"
5. "Made of Stone"
6. "Lost in Paradise"
7. "My Heart Is Broken"
8. "Lithium"
9. "Sick"
10. "The Change"
11. "Call Me When You're Sober"
12. "Imaginary"
13. "Never Go Back"
14. "Bring Me To Life"

Encore

15. "Swimming Home"
16. "Your Star"
17. "My Immortal"
Rock in Rio (Portugal) & Rock am Ring
1. "What You Want"
2. "Going Under"
3. "The Other Side"
4. "Weight of the World"
5. "Made of Stone"
6. "Your Star"
7. "My Heart Is Broken"
8. "Lithium"
9. "Sick"
10. "The Change"
11. "Call Me When You're Sober"
12. "Imaginary"
13. "Never Go Back"
14. "Bring Me to Life"
Istanbul
1. "What You Want"
2. "Going Under"
3. "The Other Side"
4. "Weight of the World"
5. "Made of Stone"
6. "Lithium"
7. "Lost in Paradise"
8. "My Heart Is Broken"
9. "Sick"
10. "The Change"
11. "Whisper"
12. "Oceans"
13. "Call Me When You're Sober"
14. "Imaginary"
15. "Never Go Back"
16. "Bring Me to Life"

Encore

17. "Your Star"
18. "My Immortal"
Springfield
1. "What You Want"
2. "Going Under"
3. "The Other Side"
4. "Weight of the World"
5. "Made of Stone"
6. "Lithium"
7. "Lost in Paradise"
8. "My Heart Is Broken"
9. "Sick"
10. "The Change"
11. "Whisper"
12. "Your Star"
13. "Call Me When You're Sober"
14. "Imaginary"
15. "Never Go Back"
16. "Bring Me to Life"

Encore

17. "Disappear"
18. "My Immortal"
Porto Alegre
1. "What You Want"
2. "Going Under"
3. "The Other Side"
4. "Weight of the World"
5. "Made of Stone"
6. "Lithium"
7. "My Heart Is Broken"
8. "Lost in Paradise"
9. "Whisper"
10. "The Change"
11. "Oceans"
12. "Never Go Back"
13. "Call Me When You're Sober"
14. "Imaginary"
15. "If You Don't Mind"
16. "Bring Me to Life"

Encore

18. "Lacrymosa"
19. "My Immortal"
São Paulo
1. "What You Want"
2. "Going Under"
3. "The Other Side"
4. "Weight of the World"
5. "Made of Stone"
6. "Lithium"
7. "Lost in Paradise"
8. "My Heart Is Broken"
9. "Whisper"
10. "Oceans"
11. "The Change"
12. "If You Don't Mind"
13. "Call Me When You're Sober"
14. "Imaginary"
15. "Bring Me to Life"

Encore

16. "Disappear"
17. "My Immortal"
Buenos Aires & Bogotá
1. "What You Want"
2. "Going Under"
3. "The Other Side"
4. "Weight of the World"
5. "Made of Stone"
6. "Lithium"
7. "Lost in Paradise"
8. "My Heart Is Broken"
9. "Whisper"
10. "Oceans"
11. "The Change"
12. "Call Me When You're Sober"
13. "Imaginary"
14. "Bring Me to Life"

Encore

15. "Disappear"
16. "Your Star"
17. "My Immortal"
Santiago
1. "What You Want"
2. "Going Under"
3. "The Other Side"
4. "Weight of the World"
5. "Made of Stone"
6. "Lithium"
7. "Lost in Paradise"
8. "My Heart Is Broken"
9. "Whisper"
10. "The Change"
11. "Never Go Back"
12. "Your Star"
13. "Swimming Home"
14. "Call Me When You're Sober"
15. "Imaginary"
16. "Bring Me to Life"

Encore

17. "Disappear" (included on the original set list, but was not performed)
18. "My Immortal"
Manchester 2012
1. "What You Want"
2. "Going Under"
3. "The Other Side"
4. "Weight of the World"
5. "Made of Stone"
6. "Lithium"
7. "Lost in Paradise"
8. "My Heart Is Broken"
9. "Whisper"
10. "The Change"
11. "If You Don't Mind"
12. "Call Me When You're Sober"
13. "Imaginary"
14. "Bring Me to Life"

Encore

17. "Disappear"
18. "Your Star"
18. "My Immortal"

== Tour dates ==
Date	City	Country	Venue
North America
August 17, 2011	Nashville	United States	War Memorial Auditorium
August 20, 2011 ^{[A]}	Winnipeg	Canada	MTS Centre
South America
October 2, 2011 ^{[B]}	Rio de Janeiro	Brazil	City of Rock
North America
October 6, 2011	San Juan	Puerto Rico	José Miguel Agrelot Coliseum
October 10, 2011	Oakland	United States	Fox Oakland Theatre
October 11, 2011	Los Angeles	United States	Hollywood Palladium
October 14, 2011	Phoenix	United States	Comerica Theatre
October 15, 2011	Tucson	United States	AVA Amphitheater
October 18, 2011	San Antonio	United States	Sunken Gardens
October 19, 2011	Dallas	United States	Palladium Ballroom
October 21, 2011	Milwaukee	United States	Eagles Ballroom
October 22, 2011	Chicago	United States	Congress Theater
October 24, 2011	Royal Oak	United States	Royal Oak Music Theatre
October 25, 2011	Toronto	Canada	Sound Academy
October 27, 2011	Montreal	Canada	Métropolis
October 28, 2011	Worcester	United States	Worcester Palladium
October 30, 2011	Atlantic City	United States	House of Blues
November 1, 2011	New York City	United States	Terminal 5
Europe
November 4, 2011	London	England	Hammersmith Apollo
November 5, 2011	London	England	Hammersmith Apollo
November 7, 2011	Manchester	England	O_{2} Apollo Manchester
November 8, 2011	Glasgow	Scotland	O_{2} Academy Glasgow
November 10, 2011	Plymouth	England	Plymouth Pavilions
November 12, 2011	Leeds	England	O_{2} Academy Leeds
November 13, 2011	Birmingham	England	O_{2} Academy Birmingham
November 16, 2011	Paris	France	Olympia
November 17, 2011	Offenbach	Germany	Stadthalle Offenbach
November 18, 2011	Düsseldorf	Germany	Mitsubishi Electric Halle
November 20, 2011	Berlin	Germany	Columbiahalle
November 21, 2011	Munich	Germany	Zenith
North America
December 17, 2011	Port of Spain	Trinidad and Tobago	Hasely Crawford Stadium
January 13, 2012	Clemson	United States	Littlejohn Coliseum
January 14, 2012	Atlanta	United States	Tabernacle
January 16, 2012	Tampa	United States	Morsani Hall
January 17, 2012	Hollywood	United States	Hard Rock Live
January 18, 2012	Lake Buena Vista	United States	House of Blues
January 20, 2012	Biloxi	United States	IP Casino Resort & Spa
January 21, 2012	North Little Rock	United States	Verizon Arena
January 26, 2012	Monterrey	Mexico	Monterrey Arena
January 28, 2012	Guadalajara	Mexico	Telmex Auditorium
January 30, 2012	Mexico City	Mexico	Palacio de los Deportes
Asia
February 8, 2012	Yokohama	Japan	Pacifico Yokohama
February 9, 2012	Tokyo	Japan	Zepp Tokyo
February 10, 2012	Nagoya	Japan	Zepp Nagoya
February 13, 2012	Osaka	Japan	Zepp Osaka
February 15, 2012	Taipei	Taiwan	TWTC Nangang Exhibition Hall
February 17, 2012	Seoul	South Korea	Melon-AX Hall
February 19, 2012	Quezon City	Philippines	Smart Araneta Coliseum
February 21, 2012	Hong Kong	Hong Kong	AsiaWorld–Arena
February 23, 2012	Kuala Lumpur	Malaysia	KL Live
February 25, 2012	Jakarta	Indonesia	Jakarta International Expo
February 27, 2012	Singapore		Singapore Indoor Stadium
Oceania
March 23, 2012	Canberra	Australia	Royal Canberra Theatre
March 24, 2012	Melbourne	Australia	Rod Laver Arena
March 26, 2012	Brisbane	Australia	Brisbane Convention Centre
March 28, 2012	Newcastle	Australia	Newcastle Entertainment Centre
March 29, 2012	Sydney	Australia	Sydney Entertainment Centre
March 31, 2012	Auckland	New Zealand	Vector Arena
North America
April 17, 2012	Austin	United States	Stubb's Bar-B-Que
April 21, 2012 ^{[C]}	The Woodlands	United States	Cynthia Woods Mitchell Pavilion
April 22, 2012 ^{[D]}	Dallas	United States	FC Dallas Stadium
April 24, 2012	Kansas City	United States	Midland Theatre
April 25, 2012	St. Louis	United States	The Pageant
April 28, 2012 ^{[E]}	Tampa	United States	Tampa Bay Times Forum
April 29, 2012 ^{[F]}	Jacksonville	United States	Metropolitan Park
May 1, 2012	Bossier City	United States	CenturyLink Center
May 4, 2012 ^{[G]}	Memphis	United States	Tom Lee Park
May 5, 2012 ^{[H]}	Rockingham	United States	Rockingham Speedway
Africa
May 20, 2012 ^{[I]}	Rabat	Morocco	OLM Souissi
Europe
May 25, 2012 ^{[B]}	Lisbon	Portugal	Bela Vista Park
May 26, 2012 ^{[J]}	Getafe	Spain	Getafe Open Air
June 1, 2012^{[K]}	Nürburgring	Germany	The Nürburgring Race Track
June 3, 2012	Nuremberg	Germany	Frankenstadion
June 5, 2012	Tilburg	Netherlands	Dommelsch Hall
June 7, 2012	Antwerp	Belgium	Lotto Arena
June 10, 2012 ^{[L]}	Nickelsdorf	Austria	Pannonia Fields II
June 11, 2012	Zürich	Switzerland	Maag Halle
June 12, 2012	Hamburg	Germany	Stadtpark Freilichtbühne
June 14, 2012	Dortmund	Germany	Westfalenhalle 3A
June 15, 2012 ^{[M]}	Berlin	Germany	Spandau Citadel
June 17, 2012	Prague	Czech Republic	Incheba Arena
June 18, 2012	Budapest	Hungary	PeCsa Music Hall
June 20, 2012	Athens	Greece	Helliniko Olympic Complex
Asia
June 22, 2012	Dubai	United Arab Emirates	Dubai World Trade Centre
June 23, 2012	Beirut	Lebanon	BIEL
Europe
June 26, 2012	Saint Petersburg	Russia	GlavClub
June 27, 2012	Moscow	Russia	Izvestia Hall
June 29, 2012	Dnipropetrovsk	Ukraine	Novoselytsia Park
July 1, 2012 ^{[N]}	Bucharest	Romania	Romexpo
July 4, 2012 ^{[O]}	Istanbul	Turkey	Parkorman
July 6, 2012 ^{[P]}	Rho	Italy	Fiera Milano
North America
July 29, 2012 ^{[Q]}	Dallas	United States	Gexa Energy Pavilion
July 31, 2012 ^{[R]}	Springfield	United States	Prairie Capital Convention Center
August 1, 2012 ^{[R]}	Columbus	United States	Lifestyle Communities Pavilion
August 3, 2012 ^{[R]}	Atlantic City	United States	House of Blues
August 4, 2012 ^{[R]}	Atlantic City	United States	House of Blues
August 6, 2012 ^{[R]}	Boston	United States	Bank of America Pavilion
August 7, 2012 ^{[R]}	Baltimore	United States	Pier Six Concert Pavilion
August 8, 2012 ^{[R]}	Charlotte	United States	Verizon Wireless Amphitheatre
August 10, 2012 ^{[R]}	Atlanta	United States	Aaron's Amphitheatre
August 11, 2012 ^{[R]}	Gulfport	United States	Jones Park
August 13, 2012 ^{[R]}	Belton	United States	Bell County Expo Center
August 14, 2012 ^{[R]}	Laredo	United States	Laredo Energy Arena
August 15, 2012 ^{[R]}	Midland	United States	Horseshoe Arena
August 17, 2012 ^{[R]}	Lubbock	United States	Lone Star Events Center
August 18, 2012 ^{[R]}	El Paso	United States	Don Haskins Center
August 20, 2012 ^{[R]}	Sioux City	United States	Tyson Events Center
August 21, 2012 ^{[R]}	Milwaukee	United States	Eagles Ballroom
August 23, 2012 ^{[R]}	Grand Rapids	United States	Rock the Rapids Village
August 24, 2012 ^{[R]}	Clarkston	United States	DTE Energy Music Theatre
August 28, 2012 ^{[R]}	Pittsburgh	United States	Stage AE
August 29, 2012 ^{[R]}	Holmdel	United States	PNC Bank Arts Center
August 30, 2012 ^{[R]}	Uncasville	United States	Mohegan Sun
September 1, 2012	Lenox	United States	Tanglewood
September 2, 2012 ^{[R]}	Buffalo	United States	Buffalo Outer Harbor
South America
October 4, 2012	Porto Alegre	Brazil	Pepsi on Stage
October 6, 2012 ^{[S]}	Rio de Janeiro	Brazil	HSBC Arena
October 7, 2012	São Paulo	Brazil	Espaço das Américas
October 11, 2012	Recife	Brazil	Chevrolet Hall
October 13, 2012 ^{[T]}	Fortaleza	Brazil	Marina Park Hotel
October 19, 2012 ^{[U]}	Asunción	Paraguay	Jockey Club del Paraguay
October 21, 2012 ^{[V]}	Buenos Aires	Argentina	Costanera Sur
October 23, 2012	Santiago	Chile	Movistar Arena
October 25, 2012	Lima	Peru	Estadio Universidad San Marcos
October 27, 2012 ^{[W]}	Bogotá	Colombia	Parque Jaime Duque
North America
October 30, 2012	Heredia	Costa Rica	Palacio de los Deportes
November 1, 2012	Panama City	Panama	Figali Convention Center
Europe
November 5, 2012	Nottingham	England	Capital FM Arena Nottingham
November 6, 2012	Manchester	England	Manchester Arena
November 8, 2012	Birmingham	England	National Indoor Arena
November 9, 2012	London	England	Wembley Arena

Festivals and other miscellaneous performances

^{A} This concert was a part of Rock on the Range
^{B} These concerts were a part of Rock in Rio
^{C} This concert was a part of Buzzfest
^{D} These concerts were a part of Edgefest
^{E} This concert was a part of 98 Rock Fest
^{F} This concert was a part of the Rockville Festival
^{G} This concert was a part of Beale Street Music Festival
^{H} This concert was a part of Carolina Rebellion
^{I} This concert was a part of the Mawazine Festival
^{J} This concert was a part of Sonisphere Spain
^{K} This concert was a part of Rock am Ring
^{L} This concert was a part of the Nova Rock Festival

^{M} This concert was a part of the Zita Rock Festival
^{N} This concert was a part of Tuborg GreenFest
^{O} This concert was a part of the Tuborg Goldfest
^{P} This concert was a part of the Heineken Jammin' Festival
^{Q} This concert was a part of 97.1 BFD
^{R} These concerts were a part of the Carnival of Madness tour
^{S} This concert was a part of Live Music Rocks
^{T} This concert was a part of the Ceará Music Festival
^{U} This concert was a part of the Asunción Rock Festival
^{V} This concert was a part of the Pepsi Music Festival
^{W} This concert was a part of Planeta Terra Bogotá
