= My Heart Is Broken =

2011 song by Evanescence

Single by Evanescence

from the album Evanescence
- Released: November 11, 2011
- Recorded: 2011 Blackbird Studio; Nashville, Tennessee
- Genre: Gothic rock
- Length: 4:29 (album version); 3:40 (radio edit)
- Label: Wind-up
- Songwriters: Amy Lee; Terry Balsamo; Tim McCord; Will Hunt; Zach Williams
- Producer: Nick Raskulinecz

Evanescence singles chronology
| "What You Want" (2011) | "My Heart Is Broken" (2011) | "Lost in Paradise" (2012) |

Music video
- "My Heart Is Broken" on YouTube

"My Heart Is Broken" is a song by American rock band Evanescence. It was released on October 31, 2011, as the second single for their eponymous third studio album (2011). An alternative version appears on the band's fourth studio album Synthesis (2017). The track was written by Amy Lee, Terry Balsamo, Tim McCord, Will Hunt and Zach Williams, while production was handled by Nick Raskulinecz. Musically, "My Heart Is Broken" is an uptempo rock ballad, whose instrumentation consists of piano, guitars and drums. Lee revealed that the song was written after seeing victims of sex trafficking. The recording received favorable reviews from music critics, who praised the combination between Lee's vocals and piano playing, as well as its fellow instrumentation; several of them chose it as a highlight on the album. On music charts, "My Heart Is Broken" reached number 36 on the Austrian Singles Chart, number 92 on the German Singles Chart and number 34 on the US Adult Top 40.

An accompanying music video for the song was filmed in December 2011 in Los Angeles by Dean Karr. It makes use of fiber optics and was inspired by dark fantasy horror film Paperhouse (1988). The video was released online on January 24, 2012 after it was leaked several hours prior to its release; its concept revolves around a girl creating a world in her dreams which later becomes a nightmare. Upon its release, it received positive reviews by critics, who generally praised the "dark" scenes. "My Heart Is Broken" was part of the band's set list for their third worldwide tour, Evanescence Tour (2011-2012), and it was also performed on The Tonight Show with Jay Leno.

== Background and composition ==
"We were having conversations with her [Lee's friend], and I was writing at the same time. And a lot of times when I write, I just sort of make up words, and something will stick, and I'll be like, 'Oh, that's from my subconscious. That's what I need to write the song about.' And that sort of happened halfway through. I was like, 'I think I'm writing about this thing, it's on my heart,' just imagining being in such a trapped place and how that might feel, so the song was actually inspired by that idea."

—Amy Lee talking to MTV News about the inspiration behind "My Heart Is Broken".

"My Heart Is Broken" was written by Amy Lee, Terry Balsamo, Tim McCord, Will Hunt and Zach Williams, while production was handled by Nick Raskulinecz. The song was recorded at Blackbird Studio in Nashville, Tennessee. During an interview, Amy Lee stated that she originally wrote the track on a harp. She further added that the band wrote the single along with "What You Want", with the piano part at the beginning of the track being as well composed on a harp, which Lee considered a slower and easier instrument for her. However, during the pre-production of Evanescence, the band quickened the tempo of the song, so when the group attempted to record the song, playing the harp's part was not feasible. Particularly, Lee confessed that the song sounded better with the piano as it was a stronger and more prominent instrument which made the song "one of the most passionate songs on the whole album". "My Heart Is Broken" portrays a ballad that starts with piano and Lee singing the lines "I will never find a way to heal my soul/ And I will wander 'til the end of time/ Torn away from you/ My heart is broken" during the chorus of the track. Chad Grischow of website IGN noticed "cascading piano and grubby march of guitar and stomping drums" in the single's composition, which was similar to the band's older material.

During an interview with Kerrang!, Lee revealed the inspiration of "My Heart Is Broken"; "A good friend of mine heads up an organization in New York that rescues victims of sex trafficking. My husband and I got involved and were really moved and horrified. As I was writing the song I was putting myself in that place – what would it be like to be trapped? Threatened? Alone? Unable to tell anyone what was happening because you're afraid of what would happen?"

In 2017, the band re-recorded the song for their reimagining album Synthesis, which returned the song musically to its original form as it was originally written with a harp and a drum loop. Amy added, "For this album, we took out the piano, and replaced it with the harp, which was played by the woman [Kirsten Agresta Copely] who originally taught me to play. We then had her harmonize in a duet with the piano before the vocals come back in."

== Release ==
On August 22, 2011, Lee went to Liberty Studios in Toronto in order to preview five mastered songs from the band's studio album—including "My Heart Is Broken"—to a selected crowd of thirty people. During an interview with MTV News, the group revealed that they wanted the song to be included on the soundtrack of movie The Twilight Saga: Breaking Dawn, with drummer Will Hunt saying, "I've been screaming for [new song] 'My Heart Is Broken' to land in that, because I think it would fit the story so well. I got sucked into the 'Twilight' vortex by the girls at home, so by default, I've got to watch it." However, the recording was not included on the soundtrack, subsequently premiering online on September 27, 2011, two weeks prior to the album's release. When interviewed by NME, Lee confirmed that the song was to be released as the second single from Evanescence. Following this, it was sent to pop, hot adult contemporary and Hot/Mod/AC radio stations in the United States on October 31, 2011. It was also served to mainstream radio stations on November 1, 2011, and was made available for digital download on November 11, 2011, being later released to modern rock radio on February 13, 2012.

== Reception ==
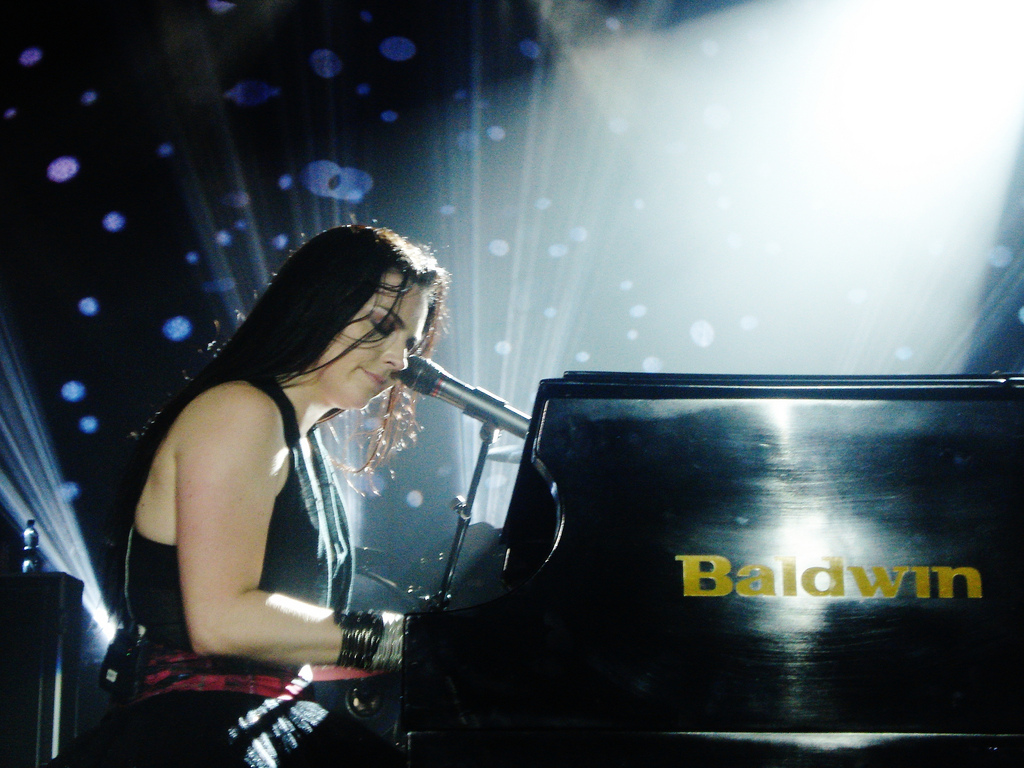
Lee performing during a concert with Evanescence in October 2011

Upon its release, the single received favorable reviews from music critics. Stephen Thomas Erlewine of AllMusic chose the song as an album highlight. Echoing this thought, Steve Beebee of rock magazine Kerrang! added that it "develops into a searching, soulful hook, ranging high among the best material this band has ever recorded." Digital Spy's Lewis Corner labelled the recording as a track to consider downloading, further writing that "'My Heart Is Broken' would strongly beg to differ, with a dashing piano riff skittling over growling guitar strums serving as a backdrop for her emotive alto-soprano." Rick Florino of Artistdirect wrote, "On 'My Heart Is Broken', a gorgeous piano intro rises alongside Lee's vibrant vocal delivery as Will Hunt's airtight drumming propels the tune into another realm." Tom Goodwyn of NME praised "My Heart Is Broken", saying that it "sounds quite a lot like a Disney ballad, beginning with Amy Lee cooing 'I will wander until the end of time' over a piano line straight off Powers Ballad Vol.12. It gets heavier at the end though, don't worry." Chris Willman of Reuters concluded that the song was "bluntly titled", while The Hollywood Reporter's Sophie Schillaci called it a "gut-wrenching" ballad. Describing the song as "fiery", Chad Grischow of IGN noted that in "My Heart Is Broken", "Lee's siren-esque vocals shine, [and] the band takes a few interesting chances late in the album." Marc Hirsh of The Boston Globe called the single "a banshee howl of defiant, [and] self-lacerating rage." Billboard magazine's Christa Titus wrote that Lee's voice was "powerful and flexible as ever, as heard in her piercing wails on hit-in-waiting 'My Heart Is Broken'." Serene Dominic of The Arizona Republic confessed that, "Really, when your heart is broken, you want a song that's as idea driven as 'My Heart is Broken' to carry you through and that's what she [Lee] delivers." Additionally, Arwa Haider of Metro commented, "Standard romantic rock bluster from Evanescence. Frontwoman Amy Lee still sounds like she’d tear strips off any would-be lothario."

For the week ending November 25, 2011, "My Heart Is Broken" debuted at number 36 on the Austrian Singles Chart; the following week, it fell to number 67, with it exiting the chart after a total of three weeks. The recording also debuted and peaked at number 92 on the German Singles Chart on November 28, 2011. On the US Adult Top 40, "My Heart Is Broken" opened at number 40 for the week ending December 4, 2011, and later peaked at number 34.

== Music video ==
=== Development ===
An accompanying music video for "My Heart Is Broken" was directed by Dean Karr. Filming commenced on December 1, 2011 in Los Angeles. During an interview with MTV News, Lee stated that the visual was "ethereal", also saying that "this [video] is going to look a lot different. Actually, I kind of wanted it to be the opposite. The first video, for 'What You Want,' was very real, and this is very surreal." The singer further confessed that the clip draws inspiration from dark fantasy horror film Paperhouse (1988) in order to achieve surreality. Lee further explained, "[It's about] this girl, and everything that she would draw would come to life in her dreams, and she was creating this dream world for herself. And at first, it was cool, but then it's like this nightmare. So I sort of thought it would apply, and be cool, to have it be this dream that you're trapped in. So you're in a place that, at first, is a magical world, but at the same time, you're isolated and trapped there, and that's the reason you want to come back to reality after a time." When filming the video, fiber optics were used reportedly in order to create the effect of things coming to life after drawing them. Lee described the appearance of the rest of the group in the visual as "sort of like the dream within the dream, in an abyss of darkness".

=== Concept ===
The video commences with Lee lying on a black background while lip-syncing the lyrics of the song, with shots of fellow members and the singer drawing lines with a light in her hand being seen. Following this, she gets up off the ground and starts creating grass around her with the light previously shown. Subsequently, she is portrayed drawing stars and walking through the world she has created. The next scene sees the singer playing the piano in a room with a small window, which Lee then touches to break and to illuminate the screen with white light. According to James Montgomery of MTV News, at the end, "she eventually realizes that, in spite of her attempts, she is just as trapped as she was before [...] At [the] clip's end, the viewer is left to wonder whether she has the power to escape [...] which, in a way, only further connects the video to the song itself."

=== Release and reception ===
A behind-the-scenes video was released on MTV on January 18, 2012, and premiered on Evanescence's Vevo account on YouTube on January 24. However, it was leaked several hours prior to its release on the Internet. During the pre-release of the video, James Montgomery of MTV News noted that the video was a "labor of love, for both the band and their director". In a later-published article, he labelled the clip as "dark, dreamlike thing that pushes Amy Lee's claustrophobic musings to the next level. And somewhere beyond that too", further describing it as "both haunting and haunted". While Jason Lipshutz of Billboard saw the music video as "mystical", a writer of Spin wrote, "[The video] features pretty lights and a field of wheat, in addition to the usual Evanescence fare — frontwoman Amy Lee in pale chiffon and corsets, a fantasy world involving lots of wind and unpleasant situations [...] and dreadlock-banging galore." HitFix's Melinda Newman compared the lightning scenes of the video to the light displays of United States' Independence Day, further adding that "it's all darkly lit and dramatic and Lee, as usual, looks absolutely stunning and haunted all at the same time. Her band mates get just enough screen time to prove to their parents they are in the band."

== Live performances ==
Evanescence performed "My Heart Is Broken" live for the first time during the 2011 Rock in Rio festival on October 2, 2011. They later added the song to the set list of their third worldwide tour in support of Evanescence; Sophie Schillaci of The Hollywood Reporter wrote that Lee's "high energy and an undeniably fierce vocal style" were best demonstrated during the performance of "My Heart Is Broken". Additionally, on February 1, 2012, the band performed "My Heart Is Broken" during The Tonight Show with Jay Leno. In 2016 and 2017, the song was added to the set list of the band's tour which visited cities in the US and Europe.

== Track listing ==
- Digital download
1. "My Heart Is Broken" – 4:30
2. "My Heart Is Broken" (Rock Mix) – 4:29
3. "My Heart Is Broken" (Pop Mix) – 4:02

== Charts ==
| Chart (2011–12) | Peak position |
|---|---|
| Austria (Ö3 Austria Top 40) | 36 |
| Czech Republic (Modern Rock) | 10 |
| Germany (GfK) | 92 |
| Hungary (Single Top 40) | 7 |
| US Adult Pop Airplay (Billboard) | 34 |

== Certifications ==
| Region | Certification | Certified units/sales |
|---|---|---|
| Brazil (Pro-Música Brasil) | Gold | 30,000^{‡} |
^{‡} Sales+streaming figures based on certification alone.

== Release history ==
Release dates and formats for "My Heart Is Broken"
| Region | Date | Format | Label(s) | Ref. |
|---|---|---|---|---|
| United States | November 1, 2011 | Mainstream airplay | Wind-up | |
