= Black River Coliseum =

Multi-purpose arena in Poplar Bluff, Missouri

Coordinates: 36.7545°N 90.3970°W

Black River Coliseum is a 5,000-seat multi-purpose arena in Poplar Bluff, Missouri. It was built in 1999. It hosts various local concerts and sporting events for the area.

In March 2008, it was briefly used to house hundreds of area residents who had to be evacuated due to historic flood levels in the region in the same fashion as New Orleans refugees from Hurricane Katrina sought shelter in the Louisiana Superdome and Astrodome.
