= M Music & Musicians =

American music magazine

Cover of the July–August 2010 edition

M Music & Musicians (alternatively known as Music & Musicians and often shortened to just M) is an American magazine based out of Redondo Beach, California, that covers the music industry. It was established in November 2009. The central management team is made up of Merlin David (formerly of Performing Songwriter), editor Rick Taylor (Performing Songwriter, American Media, Inc.), creative director Terrill Thomas (T13 Media, AtomFilms), senior editor Chris Neal (Performing Songwriter, American Media, Inc.), technology editor Doug Doppler and photographer Kent Kallberg. According to its initial press release, "M matches first-class features, interviews and reviews with a new distribution model" and offers "insightful, in-depth coverage from rock, pop and hip-hop to R&B, country, folk and jazz." Alicia Keys was featured on the cover of the first issue, dated January/February 2010. Subsequent cover-story subjects have included Sting, Ringo Starr, Tom Petty, Mary J. Blige and Sheryl Crow. The "Encore" section regularly features work from archives of veteran rock photographers such as Henry Diltz and Norman Seeff.

The magazine has the motto: "Songs inspire us. Music moves us. M connects us."
