= Carnival of Madness =

US rock music tour

- Genre: Hard rock; active rock; alternative rock
- Dates: July–September
- Location: United States
- Years active: 2010–2016
- Founders: In De Goot Entertainment
- Website: http://www.carnivalofmadness.com

The Carnival of Madness was an annual hard rock/alternative rock tour founded in 2010, running until 2016. The festival has a Carnival theme and a family friendly atmosphere. Artist and band signings, give away's, circus performers, fire breathers, and more are also part of the show's activities.

== Lineups ==
=== 2010 lineup ===
- Shinedown
- Chevelle
- Puddle of Mudd
- Sevendust
- 10 Years

=== 2011 lineup ===
- Theory of a Deadman
- Alter Bridge
- Black Stone Cherry
- Adelitas Way
- Emphatic

=== 2012 lineup ===
- Evanescence
- Chevelle
- Halestorm
- Cavo
- New Medicine

=== 2013 lineup ===
- Shinedown
- Papa Roach
- Skillet
- In This Moment
- We As Human

=== 2015 lineup ===
- Halestorm
- The Pretty Reckless
- Starset

=== UK Tour 2016 lineup ===
- Black Stone Cherry
- Shinedown
- Halestorm
- Highly Suspect

=== US Tour 2016 lineup ===
- Shinedown
- Halestorm
- Black Stone Cherry
- Whiskey Myers

=== 2010 tour dates ===
Date	City	Country	Venue
July 16, 2010	Jacksonville	United States	Jacksonville Arena
July 17, 2010	Simpsonville	United States	Heritage Park
July 18, 2010	Huntsville	United States	Von Braun Center
July 20, 2010	Tampa	United States	St. Pete Times Forum
July 21, 2010	Estero	United States	Germain Arena
July 23, 2010	Knoxville	United States	Civic Coliseum
July 24, 2010	Charlotte	United States	Verizon Wireless Amphitheatre
July 25, 2010	Raleigh	United States	Raleigh Amphitheatre
July 26, 2010	Virginia Beach	United States	Virginia Beach Amphitheatre
July 28, 2010	Columbia	United States	Merriweather Post Pavilion
July 30, 2010	Philadelphia	United States	Penn's Landing
July 31, 2010	Wiscasset	United States	Lincoln County Fairgrounds
August 1, 2010	Mansfield	United States	Comcast Center
August 4, 2010	Uncasville	United States	Mohegan Sun Arena
August 5, 2010	Holmdel	United States	PNC Bank Arts Center
August 6, 2010	Hopewell	United States	CMAC
August 7, 2010	Clarkston	United States	DTE Energy Music Theatre
August 9, 2010	Cleveland	United States	Time Warner Cable Amphitheater
August 10, 2010	Pikeville	United States	Eastern Kentucky Expo Center
August 11, 2010	Chicago	United States	Charter One Pavilion
August 17, 2010	Southaven	United States	DeSoto Civic Center
August 18, 2010	Lafayette	United States	Cajun Field
August 20, 2010	Oklahoma City	United States	Zoo Amphitheatre
August 21, 2010	The Woodlands	United States	Cynthia Woods Mitchell Pavilion
August 22, 2010	Grand Prairie	United States	Nokia Theatre
August 24, 2010	Casper	United States	Casper Events Center
August 25, 2010	Billings	United States	Rimrock Auto Arena at MetraPark
August 27, 2010	Kennewick	United States	Toyota Center
July 31, 2011	Twin Lakes	United States	Shadow Hill Ranch
August 1, 2011	Chillicothe	United States	Three Sister's Park
August 3, 2011	Royal Oak	United States	Royal Oak Music Theatre
August 6, 2011	Council Bluffs	United States	Harrah's Casino
August 17, 2011	Indianapolis	United States	Murat Theatre
August 20, 2011	Sedalia	United States	Missouri State Fairgrounds
August 23, 2011	Fargo	United States	The Hub
August 24, 2011	Sioux Falls	United States	Sioux Falls Arena
August 26, 2011	Louisville	United States	Cardinal Stadium
August 27, 2011	Waterloo	United States	McElroy Auditorium
August 28, 2011	Saint Paul	United States	Minnesota State Fair
August 31, 2011	Albany	United States	Times Union Center
September 1, 2011	Allentown	United States	Great Allentown Fair
September 3, 2011	Hampton Beach	United States	Hampton Beach Casino Ballroom
September 4, 2011	Bangor	United States	Bangor Waterfront
September 5, 2011	Fitchburg	United States	Central Mass Expo Center
September 7, 201	Baltimore	United States	Pier Six Concert Pavilion
September 9, 2011	Big Flats	United States	Tag's Summer Stage
September 10, 2011	Atlantic City	United States	House of Blues
September 11, 2011	Huntington	United States	Harris Riverfront Park
September 13, 2011	Charlotte	United States	Time Warner Cable Uptown Amphitheatre
September 14, 2011	Fayetteville	United States	Crown Coliseum
September 16, 2011	Tulsa	United States	Osage Million Dollar Elm Casino
September 17, 2011	Poplar Bluff	United States	Black River Coliseum
September 18, 2011	Dayton	United States	Montgomery County Fairgrounds
July 31, 2012	Springfield	United States	Prairie Capital Convention Center
August 1, 2012	Columbus	United States	LC Pavilion
August 3, 2012	Atlantic City	United States	House of Blues
August 4, 2012	Atlantic City	United States	House of Blues
August 6, 2012	Boston	United States	Bank of America Pavilion
August 7, 2012	Baltimore	United States	Pier Six Concert Pavilion
August 8, 2012	Charlotte	United States	Verizon Wireless Amphitheatre
August 10, 2012	Atlanta	United States	Aaron's Amphitheatre at Lakewood
August 11, 2012	Gulfport	United States	Jones Park
August 13, 2012	Belton	United States	Bell County Expo Center
August 14, 2012	Laredo	United States	Laredo Energy Arena
August 15, 2012	Midland	United States	Midland Horseshoe Arena
August 18, 2012	El Paso	United States	Don Haskins Center
August 20, 2012	Sioux City	United States	Tyson Events Center
August 21, 2012	Milwaukee	United States	Eagles Ballroom
August 23, 2012	Grand Rapids	United States	Rock the Rapids Festival
August 24, 2012	Clarkston	United States	DTE Energy Music Theatre
August 26, 2012	Bridgeview	United States	Toyota Park
August 28, 2012	Pittsburgh	United States	Stage AE
August 29, 2012	Holmdel	United States	PNC Bank Arts Center
August 30, 2012	Uncasville	United States	Mohegan Sun Arena
August 11, 2013	Asbury Park	United States	Stone Pony Summerstage
August 13, 2013	Cleveland	United States	Jacobs Pavilion at Nautica
August 14, 2013	Philadelphia	United States	Mann Center for the Performing Arts
August 16, 2013	Hopewell	United States	CMAC
August 17, 2013	Cincinnati	United States	PNC Pavilion at Riverbend Music Center
August 18, 2013	Bloomington	United States	U.S. Cellular Coliseum
August 20, 2013	Burgettstown	United States	First Niagara Pavilion
August 21, 2013	Bristow	United States	Jiffy Lube Live
August 23, 2013	Tinley Park	United States	First Midwest Bank Amphitheatre
August 24, 2013	Kansas City	United States	Richard Berkley Park
August 25, 2013	Cedar Rapids	United States	U.S. Cellular Center
August 27, 2013	Clarkston	United States	DTE Energy Music Theatre
August 28, 2013	Big Flats	United States	Tag's Summer Stage
August 30, 2013	Charlotte	United States	Verizon Wireless Amphitheatre
August 31, 2013	Virginia Beach	United States	Virginia Beach Amphitheatre
September 1, 2013	Raleigh	United States	Red Hat Amphitheater
September 4, 2013	Memphis	United States	Mud Island Amphitheatre
September 6, 2013	Allegan	United States	Allegan County Fair
September 7, 2013	Maryland Heights	United States	Verizon Wireless Amphitheatre
September 8, 2013	Oklahoma City	United States	Zoo Amphitheater
September 10, 2013	Morrison	United States	Red Rocks Amphitheatre
September 12, 2013	Spokane	United States	Spokane County Fairgrounds
September 14, 2013	Sacramento	United States	Discovery Park
September 15, 2013	Las Vegas	United States	The Joint
September 18, 2013	Puyallup	United States	Washington State Fair
