= Liberty Studios =

Liberty Studios is the longest-running production house in continuous operation in New York City producing films, video, advertising and e-commerce productions. The studio was founded in 1963 by Anthony Lover. Liberty Studios has received both Emmy and Academy Award nominations.

Liberty's most notable creation is HBO's program opening sequence "HBO in Space". The studio has created and produced numerous award-winning television commercials, Broadway promotions, pro bono public service announcements, music videos and feature films.
