= Edna Gundersen =

American journalist

Edna Gundersen is an American journalist who was a longtime music writer and critic for USA Today.

Gundersen grew up in El Paso, Texas. She attained a degree in journalism from the University of Texas at El Paso and then wrote features and entertainment news for the El Paso Times from 1977 to 1987. Being part of the Gannett Company news chain, her articles began appearing in USA Today in 1986, and then that paper hired her directly from 1996 to 2014. Her pieces and reviews have been frequently quoted in the rock and pop press, and the broad, national reach of USA Today has made her an influential writer.
