= Steve Beebee =

British journalist, author and broadcaster

Steve Beebee is a journalist, author and broadcaster, best known for his work with Kerrang! magazine. Beebee is one of the magazine's longest serving writers. He is known for championing bands for their genuine entertainment qualities as opposed to their tendency to fit in with present fashions and fads. Beebee is the author of Chaos AD - Rock In The Nineties (Simon & Schuster, 1997), inspired by the Headbangers Ball MTV show (TV show presenter Vanessa Warwick wrote the book's foreword).

He has also worked as a radio presenter on BRMB, a writer for Planet Rock (radio station), and had cover stories published in Smash Hits and Burn (Japan) magazines. His other interests include cars and aircraft, and he is a regular feature writer for aviation magazines and the deputy editor of FlyPast magazine.
