= Fight Like a Girl (Evanescence song) =

2025 Evanescence single featuring K.Flay

Single by Evanescence
- Released: June 6, 2025
- Length: 3:06
- Songwriters: Amy Lee; K. Flay

Evanescence singles chronology
"Afterlife" (2025)	"Fight Like a Girl" (2025)	"Who Will You Follow" (2026)

Music video
- "Fight Like a Girl" on YouTube

"Fight Like a Girl" is a 2025 song by American rock band Evanescence, featuring K.Flay. It was recorded for the film Ballerina (2025) and included in its end credits. "Fight Like a Girl" was written by Amy Lee and K.Flay. Lee's inspiration for the lyrics was the film's empowered main female character and had K.Flay's voice in her mind. The latter wrote her part following a concert while she felt adrenalized.

The song was released on June 6, 2025. The music video by Amy Lee, K.Flay and was released on July 7, 2025. It features scenes from the film and the band playing the song while surrounded by fire and rain. The single reached number 36 on the ARIA Digital Track Chart and number 67 on the UK Singles Sales Chart.

== Background and conception ==
"One of the coolest things about getting to do music for a film or even a video game is that it's always a collaboration in some way. You're working with the director and whoever's making the movie, and they care about the music in the film and want it to fit the film. So instead of the priority solely being, 'Let's make whatever we want and how we want it to feel,' it's more about fitting a character, the vibe of a scene, or wrapping up a song at the end titles. Fight Like a Woman has been really fun because it was going to be just one song, and then it spun out into two different, really cool songs with different collaborations. 'Hand That Feeds' kind of came in halfway through the process of working on 'Fight Like a Girl.'"

— Amy Lee talking about writing music for the video.

The song was co-written by Evanescence frontwoman Amy Lee in collaboration with K.Flay, it premiered online on June 6, 2025 on the same day as the movie, along with a lyric video featuring scenes from the movie. A behind the scenes video was also released on June 10, 2025 featuring the band and K.Flay recording the song in the studio. In it, Lee explains how she adopted the title from a line said by wrestler mentor Trish Stratus to the sport's protagonist Victoria when she was preparing for the fight, alluding that she uses agility and intellect as opposed to raw strength. Similarly, K.Flay elaborated how she felt there was a lot of generational trauma, rage and angst behind her part. She described the recording method as "very naturalistic" and collaborative, with the team sensing and understanding each other's energies.

Talking about the conception of the song in an interview, Lee elaborated how she had already had Amy in the back of her mind when thinking of a song to write: "Tyler calling me up to create this song for Fight Like a Woman couldn't have come at a more perfect time, I know I'm not the only girl out there ready to dig my heels in and show the world what we're made of... I really wanted this song to be a collab, and K.Flay is one of my favourite artists. It is literally a dream come true to do this together!". When coming towards the song's bridge, Lee did not know what to sing and she heard K.Flay's voice in her head. K.Flay also wrote her part of the song backstage after concluding a concert and after hearing a demo Lee had sent her. She felt "energised" and "inspired" upon hearing it. K.Flay explained during an interview how she sees the song as a means of "channel[ing] our pain and how we choose to define ourselves. What separates the hero from the villain?". Lee also revealed how she was inspired to see an empowered woman in the movie within the context of the times of political turmoil when she was writing the song.

Lyrically, the song discusses the topics of revenge, psychological resilience, and female empowerment in line with the movie's core topics. A Pulp magazine writer described it as "a track that blends Evanescence’s signature rock sound and lush instrumentation with Amy's powerful vocals and K.Flay’s sharp, fiery verses".

== Music video ==
A music video for the song directed by Chad Stahelski was released on YouTube on July 7, 2025. Speaking about the use of fire and rain in the music video, Lee said how interesting she found it to be able to work artistically on the visual aspect of the song as opposed to paying attention to all the details of the song's sonic world. She further shared how the fact she was working with a film director made it even more viable to create a video "as cool and fun and big and exciting as possible". When conceiving the video, Lee went through the movie and screenshotted scenes she found interesting, including an elevator scene which reminded her of the cover art for Evanescence's debut studio album Fallen with its "very metallic, kind of hyper-future look". The group went on building an elevator, thus "shot-matching" scenes from the movie. Her son, Jack, was also present during the filming which marked the first time he appeared at his mother's work.

The video opens with a shot of K.Flay. It then features scenes from the movie, interspersed with the band performing the song. Amy Lee appears at the song's opening, stepping on a paddle of water. She proceeds to sing the song while walking towards the camera, being joined by K.Flay and the band onwards. Towards the first chorus, the camera switches to the band performing the song at a warehouse indoors. Towards the second half of the song, the two singers are shown inside an elevator. During the song's bridge, when K.Flay performs her rapping-like part, fire can be seen around her and the band. For the rest of the video, the band continues playing the song amidst the fire, the drummer being completely on fire as rain starts pouring towards the last part. According to Paul Macmillan from Ghost Cult Magazine, the music video towards the end summons elements from the "epic climax of the film".

== Reception ==
Writing for Pulp magazine, Andrea Dea praised the song, writing, "[e]qual parts fiery and dangerous, 'Fight [l]ike a Girl' is a roaring sonic match for Ballerina's high-octane action and emotional intensity". Gregory Adams from Revolver magazine called it a "battle anthem". Dave Simpson from Pure M Magazine described the song as a "typically enthralling alt-rock offering" and went on to praise it, "As for how the new song sounds, starting with a superbly atmospheric verse full of fantastically expressive singing and extremely stirring instrumentation, 'Fight Like A Girl' builds absorbingly into an awesomely impactful chorus stuffed with splendidly vigorous vocals and immensely electrifying music."

The song peaked at number 36 on the ARIA Digital Track Chart and at number 67 on the UK Singles Sales Chart.

== Credits and personnel ==
Credits and personnel for "Fight Like a Girl" are adapted from YouTube.

Video

- Chad Stahelski – director
- Louise Rosner – production
- Nate Maydole – editing
- Gus Bendinelli – DOP
- Marjan Malakpour – stylist
- Ashton Michael – custom wardrobe pieces
- Beth Wilson – hair and makeup

== Charts ==
=== Weekly charts ===
Weekly chart performance for "Fight Like a Girl"
Chart (2025)	Peak position
Australia Digital Tracks (ARIA)	36
UK Singles Sales (OCC)	67
US Rock & Alternative Airplay (Billboard)	27
