= Afterlife (Evanescence song) =

2025 song by Evanescence

Single by Evanescence

from the album Sanctuary
- Released: 28 March 2025
- Recorded: November 2024
- Studio: Rock Falcon Studio (Nashville, Tennessee, US)
- Length: 4:09
- Label: Netflix Music; Columbia; BMG
- Songwriters: Amy Lee; Alex Seaver
- Producers: Nick Raskulinecz; Seaver

Evanescence singles chronology
| "Better Without You" (2021) | "Afterlife" (2025) | "Fight Like a Girl" (2025) |

Gunship Remix cover

Music video
- "Afterlife" on YouTube

"Afterlife" is a song by American rock band Evanescence. It was released on 28 March 2025 by Netflix Music as a single for the soundtrack of the adult animated urban fantasy action series Devil May Cry. The song also appears on the band's sixth studio album, Sanctuary. It reached number 1 on the Billboard Mainstream Rock Airplay and Rock & Alternative Airplay charts in July 2025.

== Background and release ==
"Afterlife" was Evanescence's first newly released song in four years. The song originated when Netflix, via composer Mako (Alexander Seaver), approached Amy Lee with a track that had already been started. Lee recorded vocals remotely while communicating with Seaver by email, and the track was later developed into an Evanescence recording and completed in the studio with producer Nick Raskulinecz. Lee stated that the band recorded the track quickly between touring and other studio work. It was co-produced by Seaver and Raskulinecz, with additional production by Tyler Demorest. Lee stated that she was not previously familiar with the Devil May Cry franchise, but was inspired by the series art and story after watching it. She viewed the first season in advance before co-writing the song with Seaver.

On March 21, 2025, the band posted a teaser video featuring Lee on social media, where series creator Adi Shankar shared the same teaser video. A preview snippet released prior to the single featured distorted instrumentation and the lyrics "not afraid to die". The track was sent to rock radio before it became available on streaming platforms. On March 24, 2025, the band announced "Afterlife" as a single for the Netflix animated series Devil May Cry. An animated lyric video for the song was released by Netflix on March 27, 2025, featuring sequences of the character Dante in action scenes. It was released on streaming platforms on March 28, 2025, ahead of the show's April 3, 2025 release. An alternate version of the track appears multiple times in the series.

Upon the release of "Afterlife", Lee revealed that the song was the first of several new songs the band was working on for their next album, following 2021's The Bitter Truth. The album, titled Sanctuary, was released on June 5, 2026.

== Composition and lyrics ==
The song begins with a subdued verse before shifting to a louder chorus. The lyrics reference themes of violence, emotional pain, and death, including the line "today I'm not afraid to die". They also reference supernatural and mortality themes, including the line "see you in the afterlife". MXDWN described the track as dark, with a rock-centered instrumental dominated by intense drumming and guitar riffs, and said it captures the band's gothic sound heard in earlier songs such as "Bring Me to Life" and "My Immortal". Revolver described the song as a "dark nu-ballad" and a "brooding nu-rocker", featuring quiet and loud dynamics, guitar melodies, and Lee's vocal vibrato.

Lee described the song as expressing "both the pain and the resolve", and said it presents the perspective of someone who has experienced loss and moved beyond fear.

== Reception ==
"Afterlife" was nominated for the Best Original Song – TV Show/Limited Series award at the Hollywood Music in Media Awards in 2025, and won Best Music Video (Independent) at the same event. It was also nominated for Best Song Written and/or Recorded for Television at the Guild of Music Supervisors Awards.

== Music video ==
A music video for "Afterlife" premiered on April 17, 2025. The video shows Lee walking through a rundown building before joining the band for a performance of the song. Scenes from the Devil May Cry series are shown on walls and bedsheets. The video differs from the earlier lyric video, which highlighted animated footage from the series, and instead focuses more on the band's performance. It was directed by Jason Lester and produced by Dreambear, and was filmed in a historic house in Tennessee. The video includes Easter eggs referencing the series.

== Live performances ==
Evanescence announced that they would perform "Afterlife" at The Game Awards on December 11, 2025. Lee confirmed on social media on December 3, 2025, that the performance would feature this song. The band performed it live at this event at the Peacock Theater in Los Angeles, California, which included fog effects, advanced camera work, pyrotechnics, and included footage from the series projected on giant screens. Rock Sound noted Lee's performance for her "immaculate vocals".

== Track listing ==
"Afterlife" single
| No. | Title | Length |
|---|---|---|
| 1. | "Afterlife (From the Netflix Series Devil May Cry)" | 4:09 |

"Afterlife" (Gunship Remix) single
| No. | Title | Length |
|---|---|---|
| 1. | "Afterlife (Gunship Remix) - Spotify Singles" | 4:15 |

== Gunship Remix ==
Following their performance at The Game Awards, the band released a new remix of "Afterlife" in collaboration with the synthwave band Gunship. The remix was created as part of a Spotify Singles series curated by The Game Awards, and it incorporates electronic elements and Gunship's 1980s-influenced style, which Revolver described as adding "neon-purple crystalline keyboards". Lee stated that the band had wanted to collaborate with Gunship, and had "been looking for an excuse to work with Gunship for too long", describing this version as a "dark new version" of the song. Similarly, other publications said this version has a darker, electronic edge.

The music video for the Gunship remix features a 1980s-inspired aesthetic, including lyrics displayed in green computer console-style text.

== Accolades ==
| Year | Organization | Category | Result | Ref. |
|---|---|---|---|---|
| 2025 | Hollywood Music in Media Awards | Best Original Song – TV Show/Limited Series | Nominated | |
| 2025 | Hollywood Music in Media Awards | Best Music Video (Independent) | Won | |
| 2025 | Guild of Music Supervisors Awards | Best Song Written and/or Recorded for Television | Nominated | |
| 2025 | MTV Video Music Awards | Best Rock Video | Nominated | |
| 2026 | iHeartRadio Music Awards | Rock Song of the Year | Nominated | |

== Commercial performance ==
According to Blabbermouth, the song accumulated more than six million audio streams and around five million views of the lyric video in its first week. It also achieved over 20 million streams and 10 million YouTube views in its first few weeks.

== Chart performance ==
It reached No. 1 on the Billboard Mainstream Rock Airplay chart on July 5, 2025, their first song to reach No. 1 on the chart. The achievement ended a 22-year gap between the band's first appearance on the chart and its first No. 1 single, the longest such wait for a group. The song also reached No. 1 on the Billboard Rock & Alternative Airplay chart dated July 19, 2025, becoming their first No. 1 on the chart since its launch. The achievement followed a two-week run at No. 1 on the Billboard Mainstream Rock Airplay chart. It reached No. 1 on Mediabase's Active Rock radio chart in the United States and Canada as well.

== Personnel ==
Credits adapted from Apple Music.

- Amy Lee – vocals, songwriter
- Alex Seaver – songwriter, producer
- Nick Raskulinecz – producer, engineer
- Tyler Demorest – additional producer
- Nathan Yarborough – engineer
- Ted Jensen – mastering engineer
- Zakk Cervini – mixing engineer

== Charts ==
=== Weekly charts ===
Weekly chart performance for "Afterlife"
| Chart (2025) | Peak position |
|---|---|
| Australia Digital Tracks (ARIA) | 30 |
| Canada Mainstream Rock (Billboard Canada) | 1 |
| New Zealand Hot Singles (RMNZ) | 18 |
| UK Singles Sales (OCC) | 39 |
| UK Singles Downloads (Official Charts) | 37 |
| US Hot Rock & Alternative Songs (Billboard) | 29 |
| US Rock & Alternative Airplay (Billboard) | 1 |

=== Year-end charts ===
Year-end chart performance for "Afterlife"
| Chart (2025) | Position |
|---|---|
| Canada Mainstream Rock (Billboard) | 18 |
| US Rock & Alternative Airplay (Billboard) | 8 |
| US Mainstream Rock Airplay (Billboard) | 17 |
