= Who Will You Follow =

Single by Evanescence

from the album Sanctuary
- Released: April 10, 2026
- Recorded: 2025
- Studio: MDDN Studios (Los Angeles, California, US)
- Length: 3:56
- Label: BMG; Columbia
- Songwriters: Amy Lee; Zakk Cervini
- Producers: Zakk Cervini; Jordan Fish

Evanescence singles chronology
"Fight Like a Girl" (2025)	"Who Will You Follow" (2026)	"Tell Me When You've Had Enough" (2026)

Music video
- "Who Will You Follow" on YouTube

"Who Will You Follow" is a song by American rock band Evanescence from their sixth studio album, Sanctuary. It was released on April 10, 2026, as the album's second single. The song was produced by Zakk Cervini and Jordan Fish, with the former also serving as a co-writer together with Lee.

"Who Will You Follow" was met with positive reviews from music critics upon release. It appeared on several charts and peaked at number one on the US Billboard Hot Hard Rock Songs. An accompanying music video directed by Jensen Noen premiered online on May 15, 2026. It shows scenes of Lee and the band performing the song on the street in the middle of crowds and cars as reality starts thwarting towards the second part.

== Composition and release ==
"Who Will You Follow" was written by Amy Lee and Zakk Cervini while produced by the latter and Jordan Fish. It was released on April 10, 2026, as the album's second single.

"Who Will You Follow" opens with Amy Lee's vocals accompanied by piano as she sings the lines "What have you done to me / You drain the life out of me till I don't know myself". After the first verse, the music features "a crushing wall" of guitar and electronics. Speaking about its conception, Lee said:

It's about the quest for what is real... For me, a lot of the album is the quest for humanity and being able to connect on what is real amidst a flood of lies being shoved in our face. Somebody else is literally profiting off of you believing a lie. It is just wild out there. I want us to find each other in reality, dark as it may be, because you can't fix it until you face it."

Lee also said that the main inspiration behind the song came from political unrest in the world, online misinformation and social division: “I think thematically, it just feels really on the nose of what so many of us are feeling right now, which is just completely overwhelmed by a flood of lies and just like a false world existing on the surface. The song is about breaking through the lies, you know, to find each other, to find the humanity that absolutely exists within us and underneath it all. But we got to face that darkness before we can defeat it."

The band first teased the song through their social media platforms on 3 April 2026 with an animated clip featuring waves and birds and the question posed by Lee: "When all your faith in reality fades away, who will you follow?"

== Reception ==
Writing for Revolver magazine, Gregory Adams praised the song, calling it a "dark-swaying anthem" with "full array of drama-coursing chord changes, hard-heaving gravitas and emotions-cascading moments from vocal powerhouse Lee". In a similar positive review, Chad Childers, writing for Loudwire, described the song as one of the heaviest songs in the band's music catalog and likened it to the band's older "standouts" with its "djent-y aggression helping Lee vent her way through that feeling when 'all your faith in reality fades away.'" NME's Max Pilley said it "taps" into a classic Evanescence sound "with Amy Lee's soaring, emotional vocals matched by the fierce dynamism of the rest of the band". George Garner from Kerrang! described the song as "excellent" and "powerful". Revolver magazine's Gregory Adams found the song to be a mix of "serene piano motifs and bruised-orange nu-rock riff-outs" with her "raising herself from gently-whispered musings towards a skies-splitting vibrato".

Following its release, the single appeared on several charts. It peaked at number 22 on the US Digital Song Sales chart for the week ending April 21, 2026. It marked the band's first number-one song on the Hot Hard Rock Songs chart, peaking in the week ending April 24, 2026. The song also charted at number 30 on the NZ Hot Singles Chart. In the United Kingdom, it peaked at number 39 on the UK Singles Sales Chart on the charts dated April 16, 2026.

== Music video ==
""When we were writing 'Who Will You Follow', I remember we were specifically talking about social media as a vampire. How it sucks your soul and your energy and we don't want to disengage but what we want is real connection and honesty. I think people are being sick of feeling like they're used and lied to. We are being exposed to things that we don't want to be true. But if we can't face them, then the monsters win. So the idea of the video is that there is this dark and painful reality seeping through the cracks that we have to face, that we need to face[...] And so this is about that darkness and being brave enough to face it."

— Amy Lee talking about the music video's theme.

A music video was filmed for the song in Los Angeles and was directed by Jensen Noen. It premiered on May 15, 2026 through the band's official YouTube channel. A behind-the-scenes making-of video was also released on May 18, 2026. Around the video's release, Noen shared on his Instagram profile:

"Still surreal getting the chance to create something with such an iconic artist. So many moving pieces behind the scenes, shutting down streets in downtown LA, chasing the night until sunrise, live rats on set, and somehow pulling it all together thanks to an incredible crew."

For the purposes of the video, everything was filmed in double speed and there were forty actors in it. The idea of using an elevator and twelve rats were both Lee's. She came up with the idea of using rats due to the song's visual lyrics "the rats in the wall are already coming through" in the second half.

It opens with shots of Amy Lee inside a hall with arched ivory doors. She is then shown in the middle of a crowd of people who are frozen in time. As the song starts, the crowd unfreezes and the band is shown performing the song. This is interspersed with her walking in the middle of the crowd again, among people looking at their phones. She walks towards an elevator which starts moving downwards and the crowd around her disappears. It eventually crushes down and all the glass breaks around her as Lee goes out and enters a bar where the crowd is again. Scenes of the band performing on the street in the middle of the crowd and in the middle of moving cars are also shown. As the song proceeds towards the bridge, the background behind the band starts thwarting: parts of the concrete begin detaching from the road, facade parts start detaching from buildings, cars start floating and crushing and the debris starts floating around the band. Scenes of rats seen in the bar underground as Lee walks among them are also shown.

Maddy Howell of Rock Sound was positive of the clip, calling it "gorgeous" and "stunningly cinematic". In an in-depth analysis for Metal Planet Music, a writer found that the "thought-provoking imagery" was exploring topics such as technology, misinformation and digital culture, particularly "online noise" and its impact on people, concluding: "Both the lyrics and accompanying video emphasise the importance of seeking authenticity in an era where truth feels increasingly and intentionally corrupted". Gregory Adams of Revolver Magazine compared the elevator scenes to movies from Tower of Terror, calling it a "ride to hell".

== Live performance ==
The song had its live debut during the band's performance at the Sick New World fest in Las Vegas, Nevada on April 25, 2026.

== Personnel ==
Credits adapted from Apple Music and the official music video on YouTube.

Song credits

- Amy Lee – vocals
- Zakk Cervini – mixing engineering, production
- Jordan Fish – production
- Troy McLawhorn – guitar
- Tim McCord – guitar
- Emma Anzai – bass
- Will Hunt – drums
- Julian Gargiulo – assistant mixing engineering, engineering, production, editing engineering
- Luc Alexiades – assistant mixing engineering, editing engineering
- Ted Jensen – mastering engineering
- Kevin McCombs – engineering

Video credits

- Jensen Noen – director
- Phoenix Vaughn, Ruth Devereaux, Ashley Haines – producers
- Blesscode Entertainment – production company
- Inception Post – Visual effects (VFX)
- Alex Verenchyck – Inception Post Lead VFX Artist
- Jensen Noen – Inception Post Creative Director
- Jensen Noen – editor
- Vasyl Liubka – assistant editor
- Matt Osborne at Company 3 – colorist
- MasterShot – production software
- Powell Robinson – direction of photography
- Christina Giddens Garcia – production designer
- Briana Goldberg – production manager
- Mikyla Bordner – casting director
- Beth Mignogna – HMU designer for Amy Lee
- Emilia Werynska – HMU designer for band
- Kendall Foote – first assistant director
- Nate Thomson – CLT
- Adam Shambour – key grip
- Aaron Gantt – SteadiCam Op
- Beth Mignona – hair and makeup
- Marjan Malakapour, Ashton Michael – styling

== Charts ==
Chart performance for "Who Will You Follow"
Chart (2026)	Peak position
Australia Digital Tracks (ARIA)	21
Bolivia Airplay (Monitor Latino)	3
Canada Mainstream Rock (Billboard Canada)	1
Colombia Anglo Airplay (Monitor Latino)	14
Italy Rock Airplay (EarOne)	9
New Zealand Hot Singles (RMNZ)	30
Nicaragua Anglo Airplay (Monitor Latino)	3
UK Singles Downloads (Official Charts)	36
UK Singles Sales (OCC)	39
US Digital Song Sales (Billboard)	22
US Hot Rock & Alternative Songs (Billboard)	37
US Rock & Alternative Airplay (Billboard)	1
