= Sanctuary (Evanescence album) =

Studio album by Evanescence
- Released: June 5, 2026
- Recorded: November 2024 – 2026
- Studios: MDDN Studios (Los Angeles, California, US); Steakhouse Studios (Los Angeles, California, US); Rock Falcon Studio (Nashville, Tennessee, US)
- Genres: Gothic rock; hard rock; alternative metal
- Length: 49:00
- Labels: BMG; Columbia
- Producers: Jordan Fish; Zakk Cervini; Nick Raskulinecz; Alex Seaver; Tyler Demorest

Evanescence chronology
The Bitter Truth (2021)	Sanctuary (2026)

Singles from Sanctuary
- 1. "Afterlife" Released: March 28, 2025; 2. "Who Will You Follow" Released: April 10, 2026; 3. "Tell Me When You've Had Enough" Released: September 4, 2026

Sanctuary is the sixth studio album by the American rock band Evanescence, released on June 5, 2026 through BMG. The album is produced by Jordan Fish, Nick Raskulinecz, and Zakk Cervini, and it is the band's first to feature bassist Emma Anzai.

Sanctuary has been supported by three singles: "Afterlife", released on March 28, 2025 as part of the Devil May Cry soundtrack; "Who Will You Follow", released on April 10, 2026; and "Tell Me When You've Had Enough", released on September 4, 2026. The band embarked on a world tour in promotion of the album starting June 11, 2026.

== Background and conception ==
In September 2024, the band stated that they would be entering the studio to record new music for their sixth studio album that November. The song "Afterlife," from the Netflix animated series Devil May Cry, was released as a single on March 28, 2025. Amy Lee called it "the first of many" new songs that were to be released. In December 2025, Lee stated that there would be a new Evanescence album released in 2026. The album's title and artwork was announced in April 2026.

Speaking about the album's title during an interview with Kerrang! in April 2026, Lee said she had referenced it in a November 2025 concert where she said "This is our sanctuary, we find comfort and connection through the power of music." With the record, she aimed to make music that was more open and honest. Made in the midst of American president Donald Trump's re-election, Lee said that the band was concerned by the political turmoil in the country and wanted to channel their emotions into their songs, saying:

Turn on the news and you can get inspired to write a heavy rock song with plenty of rage, especially as a woman. It's just really hard, because I'm not political. I don't want this. This was put upon us all. How we react and respond to this moment has nothing to do with if we want to be a 'political voice'. I absolutely do not, but I do want to rise to the moment. We don't have a choice. We've been forced into this situation where if we don't speak up and fight back against tyranny, against human rights violations, against blowing people up, we're next.

In the fall of 2024, Lee was angered by the re-election of Donald Trump, catalyzing her to write "About Us" and the album closer "Wide Open Heart", a song about her faith in humanity. Lee wrote the ballad "Forever Without You" as a reflection on the past, describing it as "processing in a way that I couldn’t do until over 20 years later" and seeing "the full picture, good and bad, balm and wound".

In the spring of 2025, Lee and guitarist Troy McLawhorn went into the studio with Jordan Fish and Zakk Cervini not knowing if the collaboration would work. Cervini approached Lee to collaborate after mixing "Afterlife" and suggested to bring Fish in, who she previously met in 2023 and wanted to collaborate with. After the first day in the studio, they wrote "Tell Me When You've Had Enough," including the hook with lyrics. By the second day, they developed the core of the title track, "Sanctuary." After the initial session, Fish traveled to Nashville to work on three tracks produced by Nick Raskulinecz. Fish was asked to add synths and "tie them more together with the other songs that they’d written."

The lead single, "Who Will You Follow", was the last song written and recorded for the album. It was conceived collaboratively with Jordan Fish the last time the band was in the studio to wrap up recordings. Fish came up with electronic sounds on his laptop, McLawhorn wrote a riff, and Hunt suggested a tempo change.

On working with Fish and Cervini, Lee said that she "think[s] the speed of both Jordan and Zakk producing is amazing because before you have time to get burned out, exhausted, or forget your idea, they already have a bed ready, where it sounds fantastic. The production elements are already in place, giving the vibe, and you never lose that momentum."

== Release and promotion ==
Sanctuary was released on June 5, 2026, through BMG Rights Management.

"Afterlife", the first song released from the album, was released on March 28, 2025 as part of the soundtrack of the adult animated series Devil May Cry. The album's second single, "Who Will You Follow", was released on April 10, 2026. "Tell Me When You've Had Enough" was released as the third single on September 4, 2026.

The album was promoted by a headlining world tour that began on June 11, 2026, in West Palm Beach, Florida. Openers across select dates of the tour include K.Flay, with whom the band released the non-album single "Fight Like a Girl" from the soundtrack of Ballerina (2025); Spiritbox; Poppy; and Nova Twins.

== Critical reception ==
Professional ratings
Review scores
Source	Rating
AllMusic	4.5/5 stars
The Arts Desk	4/5 stars
Blabbermouth.net	8.5/10
Kerrang!	4/5
Metal Hammer	4/5 stars
Wall of Sound	9/10

Writing for Blabbermouth.net, Anne Erickson called Sanctuary a "fairly heavy" record that sees the band experimenting while carrying over their brand of gothic hard rock. Steve Beebee from Kerrang said the album "investigates new paths" and has influences of producer Jordan Fish's electronic stylings, commending the band's forward-facing approach and finding the music prime for a live setting.

== Commercial performance ==
In the United States, Sanctuary debuted at number 38 on the Billboard 200 with just over 21,000 album-equivalent units.

In the United Kingdom, the album debuted on the UK Albums Chart at number 10, selling 7,334 total units.

In Japan, Sanctuary peaked at number 35 on the Oricon Albums Chart, selling 1,229 copies in its first week.

== Track listing ==
Sanctuary track listing
No.	Title	Writer(s)	Producer(s)	Length
1.	"Beautiful Lie"	Amy Lee; Troy McLawhorn; Tim McCord; Emma Anzai; Will Hunt	Nick Raskulinecz	4:11
2.	"Tell Me When You've Had Enough"	Lee; Jordan Fish; McLawhorn; Zakk Cervini	Cervini; Fish	3:19
3.	"Who Will You Follow"	Lee; Fish; Cervini; McLawhorn; McCord; Anzai; Hunt	Cervini; Fish	3:55
4.	"Rapture"	Lee; Fish; McLawhorn; Cervini	Cervini; Fish	3:26
5.	"Afterlife"	Alex Seaver; Lee	Raskulinecz; Seaver	4:09
6.	"Sanctuary"	Lee; Fish; McLawhorn; Cervini; Anzai	Cervini; Fish	4:18
7.	"How Do I Heal"	Lee; Fish; Cervini	Cervini; Fish	3:49
8.	"About Us"	Lee; McLawhorn; McCord; Anzai; Hunt	Raskulinecz	4:50
9.	"Calm Down"	Lee; McLawhorn; McCord; Anzai; Hunt	Raskulinecz	4:18
10.	"Self Destruct"	Lee; Hunt; McLawhorn; Fish	Cervini; Fish	3:54
11.	"Forever Without You"	Lee; Skylar Grey	Raskulinecz	5:15
12.	"Wide Open Heart"	Lee; Fish; McLawhorn; Cervini	Cervini; Fish	3:36
Total length:				49:00

Japanese edition bonus tracks
No.	Title	Writer(s)	Length
13.	"Forever Without You" (Solo Performance Mix)	Lee; Skylar Grey	5:13
14.	"Fight Like a Girl" (featuring K.Flay)	Lee; Kristine Flaherty	3:06
Total length:			57:25

Deluxe digital edition
No.	Title	Length
13.	"Beautiful Lie" (instrumental)	4:11
14.	"Tell Me When You've Had Enough" (instrumental)	3:18
15.	"Who Will You Follow" (instrumental)	3:55
16.	"Rapture" (instrumental)	3:29
17.	"Afterlife" (instrumental)	4:09
18.	"Sanctuary" (instrumental)	4:16
19.	"How Do I Heal" (instrumental)	3:49
20.	"About Us" (instrumental)	4:50
21.	"Calm Down" (instrumental)	4:19
22.	"Self Destruct" (instrumental)	3:52
23.	"Forever Without You" (instrumental)	5:13
24.	"Wide Open Heart" (instrumental)	3:35
Total length:		98:12

The album was released with two deluxe versions: one featuring a bonus Blu-ray disc of a 2023 concert in São Paulo, and a Japanese version that includes a bonus Blu-ray disc of a live show from the Worlds Collide tour in Amsterdam in 2023.

== Personnel ==
Credits are adapted from Tidal.

=== Evanescence ===
- Amy Lee – vocals (all tracks), keys (all tracks), programming (tracks 1, 8, 9), string arrangement
- Troy McLawhorn – guitar
- Emma Anzai – bass
- Tim McCord – guitar
- Will Hunt – drums

=== Additional musicians ===
- Jordan Fish – programming (1, 8, 9)
- Tiago Nunez – programming (1, 8, 9)
- Will B. Hunt – programming (9)
- Carrie Lee South – additional vocals (1)
- Lori Bulloch – additional vocals (1)
- Susie Benchasil Seiter – conductor, orchestration (6, 7, 10–12)
- Chad Seiter – additional orchestration (6, 7, 10–12)
- Dinos Alvanos — music preparation, orchestration assistant (6, 7, 10–12)
- Connor Bamsey – score crew (6, 7, 10–12)
- Hannah Kacmarsky – score crew (6, 7, 10–12)
- Michael Wandmacher – string arrangement (6, 7, 10–12)
- Adam Millstein – violin (6, 7, 10–12)
- Aiko Richter – violin (6, 7, 10–12)
- Ana Landauer – violin (6, 7, 10–12)
- Anna Kostyuchek – violin (6, 7, 10–12)
- Ben Jacobson – violin (6, 7, 10–12)
- Chad Cannon – violin (6, 7, 10–12)
- Christian Hebel – violin (6, 7, 10–12)
- Ellen Jung – violin (6, 7, 10–12)
- Eun-Mee Ahn – violin (6, 7, 10–12)
- Fernando Lascura – violin (6, 7, 10–12)
- Gallia Kastner – violin (6, 7, 10–12)
- Haesol Lee – violin (6, 7, 10–12)
- Leah Zeger – violin (6, 7, 10–12)
- Marisa Kuney – violin (6, 7, 10–12)
- Mark Robertson – violin (6, 7, 10–12), concertmaster, contractor
- Mona Tian – violin (6, 7, 10–12)
- Nina Evtuhov – violin (6, 7, 10–12)
- Stephanie Matthews – violin (6, 7, 10–12)
- Yvette Holzwarth – violin (6, 7, 10–12)
- Andrew Duckles – viola (6, 7, 10–12)
- Carolyn Riley – viola (6, 7, 10–12)
- Corrine Sobolewski – viola (6, 7, 10–12)
- I-Ting Huang – viola (6, 7, 10–12)
- Luke Maurer – viola (6, 7, 10–12)
- Stefan Smith – viola (6, 7, 10–12)
- Ben Lash – cello (6, 7, 10–12)
- Dave Eggar – cello (6, 7, 10–12)
- Evgeny Tonkha – cello (6, 7, 10–12)
- Hillary Ahn – cello (6, 7, 10–12)
- Sarah Kim – cello (6, 7, 10–12)
- Vanessa Freebairn-Smith – cello (6, 7, 10–12)
- Eric Shetzen – bass (6, 7, 10–12)
- Steve Pfeiffer – bass (6, 7, 10–12)

=== Technical ===
- Nathan Yarborough – engineering (1, 8, 9)
- Julian Gargiulo – engineering (2–4, 6, 7, 10, 12), mixing assistance (all tracks)
- Nick Raskulinecz – engineering (5, 11)
- Justin Moshkevich – engineering (6, 7, 10–12)
- Zakk Cervini – mixing
- Luc Alexiades – mixing assistance
- Ted Jensen – mastering

== Charts ==
Chart performance for Sanctuary
Chart (2026)	Peak position
Australian Albums (ARIA)	2
Austrian Albums (Ö3 Austria)	6
Belgian Albums (Ultratop Flanders)	21
Belgian Albums (Ultratop Wallonia)	7
Canadian Albums (Billboard)	80
Dutch Albums (Album Top 100)	46
French Albums (SNEP)	23
French Rock & Metal Albums (SNEP)	1
German Albums (Offizielle Top 100)	5
German Pop Albums (Offizielle Top 100)	2
Greek Albums (IFPI)	92
Italian Physical Albums (FIMI)	15
Japanese Albums (Oricon)	35
Japanese Digital Albums (Oricon)	18
Japanese Rock Albums (Oricon)	7
Japanese Top Albums Sales (Billboard)	28
New Zealand Albums (RMNZ)	5
Polish Albums (ZPAV)	45
Portuguese Albums (AFP)	38
Scottish Albums (Official Charts)	8
Spanish Albums (Promusicae)	72
Swiss Albums (Schweizer Hitparade)	7
UK Albums (Official Charts)	10
UK Rock & Metal Albums (Official Charts)	1
US Billboard 200	38
US Independent Albums (Billboard)	5
US Top Rock & Alternative Albums (Billboard)	8
