= Evanescence =

American rock band

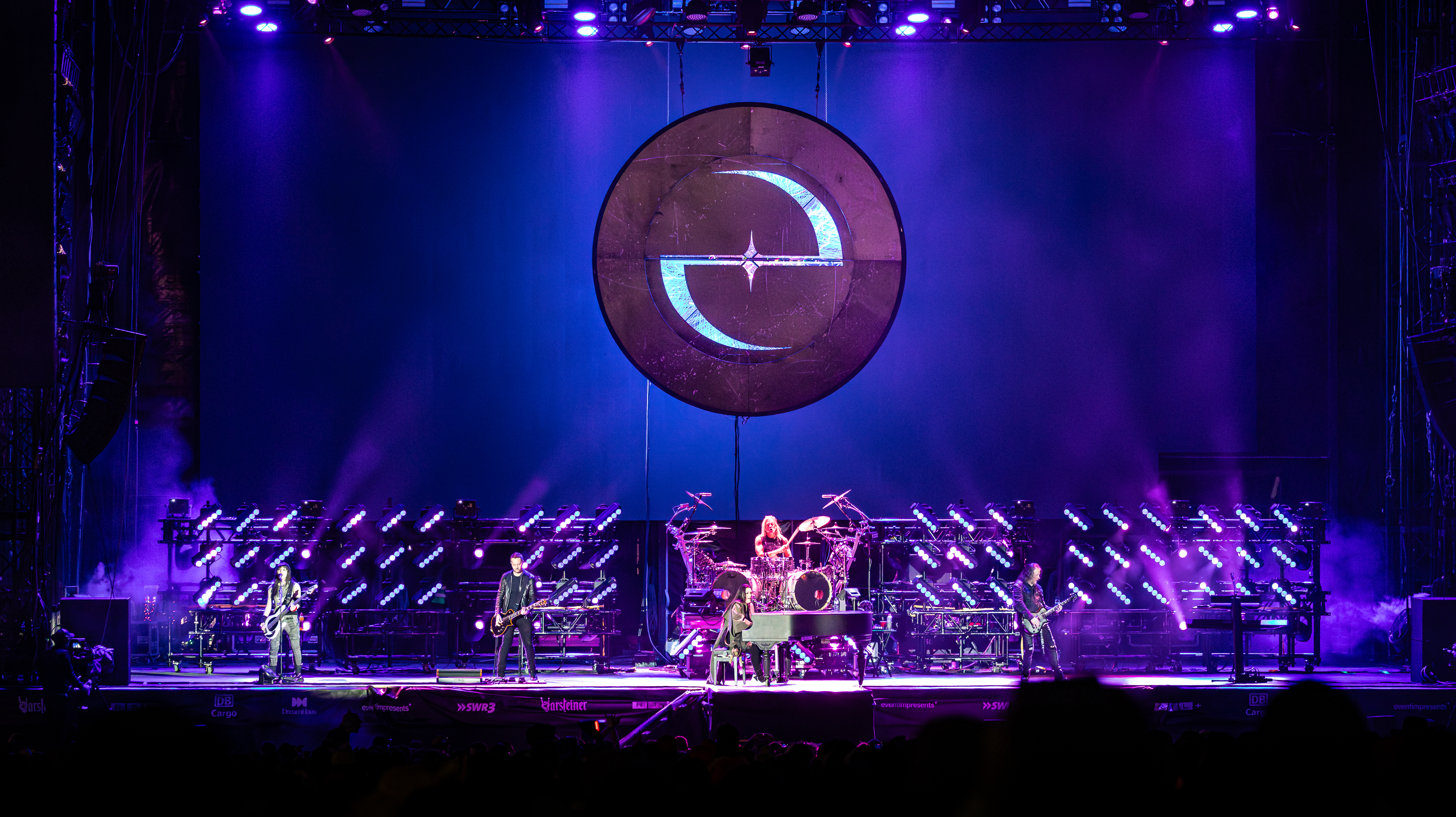
- Evanescence in 2023

Background information
- Origin: Little Rock, Arkansas, U.S.
- Genres: Alternative metal; gothic metal; gothic rock; hard rock; industrial rock; symphonic metal; nu metal (early)
- Works: Discography
- Years active: 1994–present
- Labels: Wind-up; Concord Bicycle; BMG
- Members: Amy Lee; Tim McCord; Will Hunt; Troy McLawhorn; Emma Anzai
- Past members: Ben Moody; David Hodges; Will Boyd; Rocky Gray; John LeCompt; Terry Balsamo; Jen Majura
- Website: evanescence.com

Evanescence is an American rock band founded in 1994 by singer and keyboardist Amy Lee and guitarist Ben Moody in Little Rock, Arkansas. After releasing independent EPs and a demo CD as a duo in the late 1990s, Evanescence released their debut studio album, Fallen, on Wind-up Records in 2003. Propelled by the success of hit singles including "Bring Me to Life" and "My Immortal", Fallen sold more than four million copies in the US by January 2004, garnering Evanescence two Grammy Awards out of six nominations. They released their first live album and concert DVD, Anywhere but Home, in 2004, which sold over one million copies worldwide.

Evanescence released their second studio album, The Open Door, in 2006, co-composed by Lee and guitarist Terry Balsamo. It received a Grammy nomination and has sold more than six million copies worldwide. With Balsamo, guitarist Troy McLawhorn, bassist Tim McCord and drummer Will Hunt, the band reconvened in 2009 to work on music for their next album, Evanescence. Released in 2011, it marked the first album co-written as a band. It debuted at the top of the Billboard 200, Rock Albums, Digital Albums, Alternative Albums, and Hard Rock Albums charts. Following the end of the album's tour cycle, the band entered a hiatus.

In 2014, Lee and Evanescence left their record label and became an independent band. The band emerged from hiatus in 2015 and resumed touring, while a new album was not yet created as Lee was also focusing on a solo project. In 2016, Lee stated that Evanescence was working on a fourth album, Synthesis (2017), composed of orchestral and electronica arrangements of previous material alongside two new songs. Its release was followed by the Synthesis Live tour, in which the band performed with live orchestras for the first time. After pandemic delays, Evanescence released their fifth album, The Bitter Truth, in 2021, which reached the top five of the Billboard Independent, Alternative, and Hard Rock charts. The band's sixth album, Sanctuary (2026), was preceded by the song "Afterlife" from the Netflix series Devil May Cry.

Classified as a gothic alternative metal and hard rock band, among other genres, Evanescence have a diverse sound incorporating various musical styles including classical music, alternative music, heavy metal, industrial music, and electronic music, driven by Lee's contrasting musical pursuits and introspective songwriting. Beginning as a duo partnership, Evanescence had several lineup changes, and became a band collaboration in 2009. The band comprises Lee, McCord since 2006, McLawhorn and Hunt since 2007, and bassist Emma Anzai since 2022. Among other accolades, Evanescence has received two Grammy Awards, three Loudwire Music Awards, a Kerrang! Award, a Revolver Golden Gods Music Award, a Rock Sound award, a Brit Award nomination, three American Music Award nominations, and five MTV Video Music Award nominations. Evanescence have sold a total of 31.9 million albums, making the band one of the best selling hard rock and metal artists of all time.

== History ==
=== 1994–2000: Formation and early years ===
Singer and pianist Amy Lee and guitarist Ben Moody met in 1994 in Little Rock, Arkansas at ages 13 and 14, when the two were at a Christian youth camp where Lee played piano during sport activities and Moody played acoustic guitar and she thought they could play music together. Lee thinks what drew them together at the time was that they "didn't fit in that well" and were "out of [their] element in this silly camp environment". Within a month of meeting, Lee brought Moody a cassette tape of her playing guitar and singing a song she wrote. They became musical collaborators, playing and working on music at Lee's home, and were soon performing acoustic sets at book stores and coffee houses in the Little Rock area. Lee said their music at the time "sounded different because we didn't have the means to make it sound like we wanted". Strings, choirs, and "dramatic, cinematic" sounds were musical desires they couldn't materialize as they were "just two kids in a basement". Lee had a 16-track recorder and she and Moody would use it and Pro Tools, "fake strings and choirs" on her keyboard, and layer sounds and beats for their early material, which they mixed and produced. "We were basically just putting it down to remember what we wanted", Lee said.

Lee had the musical vision for Evanescence. What made her want to start a band was "the idea of combinations that were unlikely". Danny Elfman's film scores were a significant influence for her when she began creating Evanescence's music. Lee aimed to combine her various musical tastes, "bringing something from the cinematic and classical symphonic world and marrying it to metal, hard rock and alternative music." Perceiving "similarities between the drama of classical music and the heavier stuff I was listening to" inspired her to "bring those things together for myself", and she infused in Evanescence her love of contrasting sounds. "There was all this music that was inspiring me. And Evanescence was the product of these two extremes combining". After experimenting with band names, such as Childish Intentions and Stricken, Lee and Moody decided on Evanescence, which means disappearance or fading away. They wanted a name that was "out of nowhere", and when they came across the word they found it "beautiful" and "elusive".

Lee and Moody recorded two EPs as Evanescence: Evanescence (1998), of which 100 copies were made and sold at their early live performances; and Sound Asleep (1999), also known as the Whisper EP. Their demos got them airplay on the local modern rock station in Little Rock, which helped them develop a local fanbase, allowing them to play a couple of bigger shows a year and hire other musicians to perform other instruments live. Although they played with guest musicians, Evanescence remained a duo. "It was more because that's what we did and how we worked rather than not wanting any other input", Lee recalled; "the idea of a full band playing these songs was something that only came along later." Since Evanescence's start, the two had brought in several people to record or play live, but their vision was never shared by others "so it always ended reverting back to the two of us". Lee and Moody were focused on writing music over playing live shows, and they did not want to have a band join their writing process, Moody noted; "we just wanted it to be the two of us and so we'd play once or twice a year." He said that they would be "off writing and recording in our closets for six months", and as they couldn't have live shows with just a duo, they would book a gig and ask friends to perform with them. Moody stated that he did not remember how many EPs they released, and he viewed them as "really just a means"; CDs "we could sell ourselves at our shows so we could go out and buy pizza. They really weren't official releases".

In 2000, they self-released a demo CD called Origin, which they sold at local shows, and packaged to shop it to record labels. Lee and Moody stated that the CD was not an official release, but a compilation of their demos. Origin and their earlier EPs contain demo versions of some of the songs that would later appear on their debut album. Moody expressed dissatisfaction with their pre-Fallen material, stating in an interview, "What we had in our head was Fallen, although it was a long time ago and we didn't have the technology, so a lot of our early recordings were just shit." In a February 2003 radio interview, Lee and Moody encouraged fans to download their demos from the Internet, rather than purchase them from online sources such as eBay where it had been selling for US$400.

=== 2001–2004: Fallen and Anywhere but Home ===
Evanescence were having their demos mastered at Ardent Studios in Memphis, where a producer heard it and played the demos to his friend at Wind-up Records, head of A&R Diana Meltzer. Meltzer said what made her want to sign them was Lee's voice, lyrics and their gothic sound. When she heard "My Immortal" she said she "knew it was a hit". Evanescence was signed by Wind-up in 2001. The label flew them to New York, and told them that they loved their different sound and thought they had potential, but "we don't really totally know what to do with you", Lee recalled. They were then told, "if you were this good while distracted by school and all this other stuff, how good will you be if we put you in an environment where you have nothing to do but write and be influenced by your surroundings, like in Los Angeles." They were relocated to Los Angeles, given an apartment and rehearsal space and enrolled in a gym, according to Meltzer, and Lee, who was very introverted, received help from an acting teacher to overcome her stage fright. Meltzer told HitQuarters in 2003 that, while she loved Lee's voice, their gothic sound, and Lee and Moody had already exhibited "huge talent" with their prior demo material, they were still young and she felt they could benefit from more time to work on their debut album so they "could deliver a breakthrough sound".

Lee said that at the time of signing, they did not realize the label would move them out to Los Angeles for two years, thinking it would be about six months. The length of time in Los Angeles "really frustrated" them. The label was apprehensive about the marketability of a female-led band, and advised them to just keep writing songs. It ended up being a fruitful writing experience in Los Angeles, Lee said, as they wrote half of the album there and were able to make use of other equipment to get sounds they wanted. After almost two years of Evanescence working on the album, Dave Fortman was brought in to produce it. Then, label executives refused to release the album unless Lee and Moody agreed to hire a full-time male co-vocalist. When they did not agree, the label said they were withdrawing their funding and releasing them from their contract. They left Los Angeles and drove back to Little Rock.

A few weeks later, the label relented, informing them that they would release their album if they agreed to have a male rapper on its lead single, "Bring Me to Life", in order to give something familiar to listeners. Lee was not happy about this, but reluctantly agreed to the compromise and wrote the part for the male vocal. She originally wanted the lead single to be "Going Under" as she was concerned that the public would hear "Bring Me to Life" with its male vocal and decide that was the sound of the band. She was relieved that people were still receptive to Evanescence when "Going Under" was released as their second single. Lee prefers "Bring Me To Life" without the label-forced rap, and expressed dissatisfaction that it "stamps a time period" on the song; however, she made peace with it because they were able to "survive past it" and "people were able to, for the most part, understand who we are without us getting stuck in that place."

"Bring Me to Life", featuring guest vocals from Paul McCoy of 12 Stones, and "My Immortal" were originally featured on the soundtrack of the 2003 action film Daredevil, released in February 2003. Evanescence's debut album Fallen was released by Wind-up on March 4, 2003. As with their pre-Fallen work, Lee and Moody were the main writers of the album, with Lee being the core writer. Most of Lee's writing on Fallen was inspired by an abusive relationship she was in. Lee and Moody said they did not consider their music to be "goth", with Moody adding that he thinks the "goth" label came because the songs sound sad and people think that "sad equals dark equals Goth. It's real easy for them to throw us in that box". Moody also disliked the nu metal label, stating: "I think the only nu-metal thing about us is the fact that on one song we have rap and singing". Lee also disagreed with the nu metal tag, attributing it to the rap rock of "Bring Me to Life". After the album's completion, the touring lineup was hired: guitarist John LeCompt, drummer Rocky Gray, and bassist Will Boyd, the first two old friends of Moody.

Evanescence's music was initially promoted by their label in the Christian market, and Lee and Moody publicly made it clear in an April 2003 interview that they were not a Christian band or Christian rock. Moody's comments against being in the Christian market immediately prompted the label's chairman Alan Meltzer to send a letter to Christian radio and retail outlets explaining that despite the "spiritual underpinning that ignited interest and excitement in the Christian religious community", Evanescence were "a secular band, and as such view their music as entertainment" and the label then "strongly feels that they no longer belong in Christian retail outlets". Wind-up formally requested the recall of Fallen from Christian retailers and radio stations. After receiving the letter, many Christian radio stations pulled Fallen songs from their playlists.

Rolling Stone stated in April 2003 that while Wind-up had no official Christian affiliation, they had been marketing their bands "to both the Christian and mainstream music market". Wind-Up "began courting the Christian music market more than a year ago, making its first foray with 12 Stones' self-titled 2002 debut. Hooking up with powerhouse Christian music distributor Provident ... Wind-Up attempted to tap into a segment that generated sales of more than 50 million albums in 2002". The CEO of Provident, Terry Hemmings, said that the decision to recall Evanescence's album likely would not hurt Wind-up's image in the Christian market, and that he was puzzled by the band's about-face, saying: "They clearly understood the album would be sold in these [Christian music] channels." Meltzer claimed their decision to promote Evanescence in the Christian market was made with the band's consent. Lee said that she had always opposed the promotion in the Christian market and the "Christian band" identification from the beginning, while Moody had supported it. Moody had misrepresented Evanescence in the past, talking about his religious beliefs as Evanescence's. The label wanted to use the Christian market promotion as a marketing tool for the band, which she had opposed, stating that "it was an important fight to me because it felt false. That wasn't really what our music was. And I felt like they were selling somebody something that wasn't true." She noted that Evanescence "has never been a Christian band" and lyrically never had a religious affiliation.

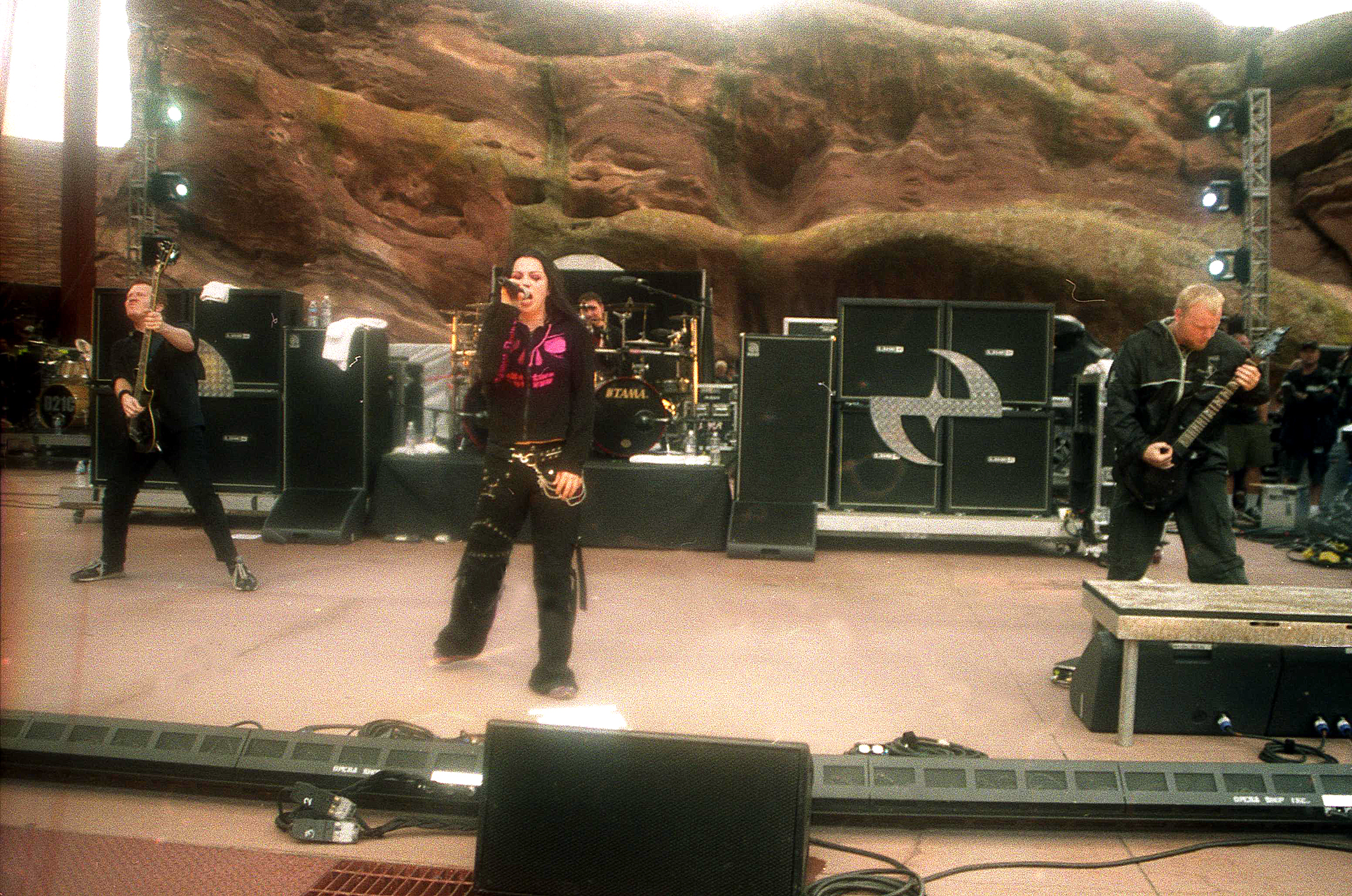
Evanescence performing in 2003 at Red Rocks Amphitheater.

On April 7, 2003, Wind-Up released "Bring Me to Life" as the album's lead single. Wind-up president Ed Vetri revealed that when the label had introduced the song to radio, radio programmers rejected it, saying, "A chick and a piano? Are you kidding? On rock radio?" Some program directors would hear the female voice and piano at the start of the song and turn it off without listening to the rest of the song. A female voice on rock radio was a rarity, and the song was considered for airplay only after there was a male vocal on it. After the song was released on the Daredevil soundtrack, a grassroots fanbase grew and listeners began requesting air play for it, compelling radio stations to reconsider the band. The song became a global hit for Evanescence and reached number five on the US Billboard Hot 100 on June 6, 2003. It topped the UK singles chart, where it peaked for four weeks from June–July 2003. On the worldwide success of the song, Lee said:

"Since we released [the song] on Daredevil it went all over the world, whether they wanted it to or not, so we had fans in countries we had never been to because they had the soundtrack and they heard it on the radio. So, it started blowing up all over the world and then we had a reason to tour all over the world. And that's how the whole international thing happened this early."

Evanescence performed on radio shows and on the festival circuit for weeks in early 2003. They embarked on their first headlining tour from April to May in the US. In June 2003, they had to cancel shows in Germany due to Moody reportedly falling ill. That month, Evanescence accepted an offer from the video game company Nintendo to perform on the Nintendo Fusion Tour, which they headlined beginning on August 4, 2003. The album's second single "Going Under" was released on August 18, 2003. It peaked at number five on the US Modern Rock Tracks, 24 on the Active Rock chart, and number eight on the UK singles chart. Lee recalled the rapid success after the album was released, with concerts going from club shows to arenas in two months. In an August 2003 interview, Moody said that Evanescence is "just Amy and I, and I want to keep it that way", adding that their process together is what works. In another interview with Rock Sound, he said that he would like tour drummer Rocky Gray to play on the next album but did not need the other tour players, LeCompt and Boyd.

On October 22, 2003, Moody left the band during the European tour for Fallen, reportedly because of creative differences. Moody had called their management and informed them he was quitting. Lee got a call from their manager asking her to "beg [Moody] to stay", to which she said "that's exactly what he wants me to do" and expressed that if Moody was going to leave, the band "would appreciate it if he'd wait until the end of the tour. But if he can't, then go ahead and go." With his impromptu exit in the middle of tour, Lee improvised and had them play as a foursome to not cancel a show. In an interview, Lee said, "we'd gotten to a point that if something didn't change, we wouldn't have been able to make a second record." She said that by that point Moody "hated the band, he hated being on tour and his negativity made everyone around him miserable. He was trying to pull the whole ship down with him" and she would not let that happen. His exit was a relief because of tensions created within the band, which was at a "breaking point". "It was a really uncomfortable situation for everybody ... completely unstable and unhappy", she explained. "It was a scary time before he left because I knew something was going to happen and I didn't know what and I was afraid everything we worked for had the potential of going down the toilet."

In Lee's termination letter to their manager, she stated that Moody was physically and verbally abusive to her. With Moody gone, "we felt like a weight had been lifted", she said. Touring guitarist John LeCompt said in a 2006 interview that Lee "gained authority as soon as Ben Moody walked out the door. They had an equal partnership, but he was the man, he had to strangle the band, all the life out of it". Lee said that she and Moody had not been friends since their teenage years, and they had pretended to be friends after Fallen's release when they were really only business partners. In 2004, Lee confirmed that there were complications for months following Moody's departure "with the legalities of everything – whether we would be legally allowed to continue under the same name". "A lot of things were held up internally that I wasn't allowed to talk about, and I was worried, because it was very important to me to be able to stand up and say, 'No. One person leaving in the middle of a tour and trying to hurt us isn't going to make us lose the entire band.'" In a 2006 interview, she stated that when Moody was in the band, "a lot of decisions had been made over my head, or around me, or for me, that I wouldn't have made for myself".

Lee said that she and Moody had never sat down and wrote together, and instead would combine their respective parts in songs. From the start, Lee would only write music by herself, considering it a vulnerable process and feeling disrespected by Moody and unsafe around him. The creation of Fallen largely consisted of her and Moody writing music separately and then adding to each other's work, due to tension and significant creative differences between them. Lee's creative disagreements with Moody included his strict approach to songwriting and focus on commerciality; he would "always be corralling" her ideas, and wanting to push them in a more commercial, pop direction. She said his influences were "a lot different" from hers. "It was always a push and pull between us, for me", she explained. "It's cool because Fallen really is a lot of compromise. It definitely leaned toward what he wanted a lot of the time." Creative restrictions included instrumentation decisions such as her wanting to play organ on the record and Moody not wanting that. She stated that at one point, all her "pianoplaying rights were stripped away" from her because Moody felt she "was getting too much attention", so a keyboard player was hired. During the making of the album, "there was so much back-and-forth and so much turmoil between us and the label and each other. I always had to fight to get my music made and I remember focussing more than anything on the work and on the fights and on, 'I'm gonna make this right'", she recalled. "I'm very proud of the way that it went, but it wasn't easy." "A lot of the reason it's been so much fun writing [post-Moody] is that we're not thinking about that. It's like, 'What do we like? What's fun?'", and there is "no pressure of wanting to rule the world".

Moody said in a 2003 interview that he focused on making the album "as accessible as possible, to as many people as possible". In 2005, he conceded that he and Lee had different approaches for the music, stating, "[Amy] is much more creative than I am ... I am a bit more commercial minded ... she is more educated musically, and she wanted to explore that. ... it was like my way or the highway. We just couldn't meet in the middle, so I was like, "The hell with it." He also said that he struggled with substance abuse during his time in Evanescence. In August 2010, he released a statement on his history with Lee and Evanescence, where he said that he was a different person at the time, his friendship with Lee had deteriorated, and they had conflicting opinions, personalities, and desires with the band. Moody apologized to Lee for comments he made to her in anger. He said he realized the band would end if he stayed and believes he made the right choice. He added, "Evanescence has progressed a great distance from the original sound, and made it clear that they intended to expand much further. Amy is very artistic and never has had a problem thinking outside of the box and defying expectations."

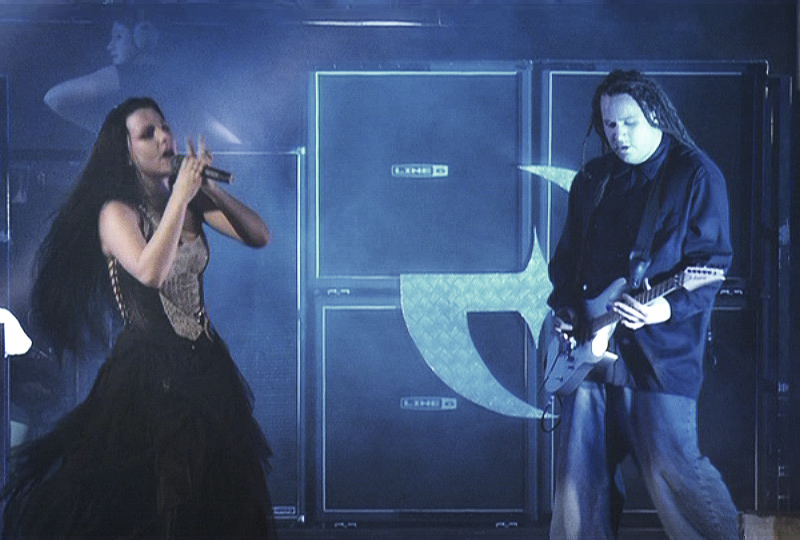
Evanescence performing at the concert in Le Zénith, Paris, featured on Anywhere but Home

Lee called former Cold guitarist Terry Balsamo, with whom Evanescence had toured, to replace Moody on the Fallen tour. Balsamo soon joined Evanescence as the permanent lead guitarist. She and Balsamo "clicked" and "connected on a lot of musical interests". The band played several shows with Korn in Europe, with Evanescence originally set to headline however Lee wanted Korn to headline instead. Fallen's third single "My Immortal" was released on December 8, 2003, and peaked at number seven on the US Hot 100 and the UK singles chart.

At the 46th Grammy Awards in February 2004, Evanescence won the Grammy Award for Best Hard Rock Performance for "Bring Me to Life" and Best New Artist from five nominations. On May 31, 2004, Fallen's fourth and final single "Everybody's Fool" was released, and peaked at number 36 on the US Modern Rock Tracks chart, and number 24 on the UK singles chart. Lee had begun writing music again by November, including the songs "Lacrymosa" and "Together Again", which she initially wrote for the soundtrack of the 2005 film The Chronicles of Narnia: The Lion, the Witch and the Wardrobe but were rejected by the studio.

During the Fallen tour, Lee wrote a song titled "The Last Song I'm Wasting on You", recording it in a bathroom on an analog recording device. It became a B-side on the single "Lithium" from Evanescence's second album. When asked if the track was about former bandmate Moody, Lee said, "If I answer that, then I'm not hiding anything anymore. But I just sort of answered it, didn't I?". She later deemed it "one of those personal, hard moments, when beauty is born out of pain". On November 24, 2004, Evanescence released their first live album and concert DVD titled Anywhere but Home, which includes a concert in Paris, a live cover of Korn's "Thoughtless", behind-the-scenes footage, three previously unreleased songs, and Fallen's four music videos. The album sold more than a million copies worldwide.

Fallen spent 43 weeks in the top 10 of the Billboard 200, peaking at number three. It was listed for 104 weeks on the Billboard 200, and it was one of eight albums in the history of the chart to spend at least a year in the top 50. Fallen was also number six on CBS's list of "Top Bestselling Albums of the Last 10 Years". It was certified platinum by the Recording Industry Association of America (RIAA) in April 2003 and 4× platinum in January 2004. It has sold more than 17 million worldwide, including 10 million in the US, since its release.

In 2023, Lee recalled the journey of early success, stating that "there was a lot to be excited about, but there was a lot of hard stuff going on in the background. Not just drama about what we were doing, but also my brother was sick, and it was a scary time to be out on my own. And I did, in a lot of ways at that time, feel alone." She found the extensive exposure and objectification at that age difficult to handle, and did not feel supported by those around her. With everything happening, she was "just sure it was always right about to fall apart." She described facing a lot of obstacles, including attempts at control and manipulation behind the scenes, as well as being considered just the singer/frontwoman among the men, and learning to say no to things. Lee deemed the "fight for credibility" as a creator to be one of the biggest challenges she faced early on with the Fallen era, explaining: "It was the mentality of labels to tell, especially newer artists, that they need to have writers. ... And the reason that they wanted [men] to do it was because that's where the money was. That's where the power was. Everybody else wanted to be able to say they did that when I did that". She also noted that, for being the frontwoman "people assume that it's not yours. And some of the people around me were more than happy to let them believe that."

=== 2004–2007: The Open Door ===
Lee musically collaborated with Balsamo for Evanescence's second album, The Open Door (2006). They began writing together in March 2004, after finishing the tour for Fallen. The album progressed slowly for several reasons, including Lee's desire to maximize the creative process and not rush production, Balsamo's stroke, and turbulence with their former manager. The writing experience for The Open Door was "the best process" Lee ever had because she had "free rein" and could "do whatever I wanted without being judged". She called this period a "beautiful time of independence". "I was still learning who I was and still growing, and wanted the space to be able to try stuff." She was inspired to make "homemade sounds" and incorporate other elements into the music.

In 2006, Lee said that when she listened back to Fallen, she "hear[d] all the vulnerability and the fear and all the childish things in me that are just human." While Lee was drowning in the misery of her experiences in Fallen, she said The Open Door is largely about her acknowledging her issues and deliberating "what do I have to do to work this out." "There were things for me to get over", she explained. "I could just have shut up and stayed stuck in a lot of negative situations and not done anything, and on the outside it would have looked like everything was fine for me". In the record, she is "purging the trials", but overall it comes from a less hopeless place and with a more reflective outlook. She also used her experience as a lone female and "hard adjustment" with the fame the Fallen era brought as inspiration for the album.

On July 13, 2006, Lee announced that bassist Will Boyd had left the band after the album was completed for "not wanting to do another big tour" and wanting "to be close to his family". In an interview with MTV, Lee announced that Tim McCord, former guitarist of The Revolution Smile, would switch instruments and play bass for the band.

The Open Door's lead single "Call Me When You're Sober" hit modern rock and alternative rock radio on August 7, 2006. The 13-track album was released in the US and Canada on October 3, 2006; the United Kingdom on October 2, 2006; and Australia on September 30, 2006. The album sold 447,000 copies in the US in its first week of sales and earned their first No. 1 ranking on the Billboard 200 album chart. The music video for "Call Me When You're Sober" was shot in Los Angeles and is based on the fairy tale Little Red Riding Hood. The Open Door became available for pre-order on the iTunes Store on August 15, 2006; the music video for "Call Me When You're Sober" was also made available.

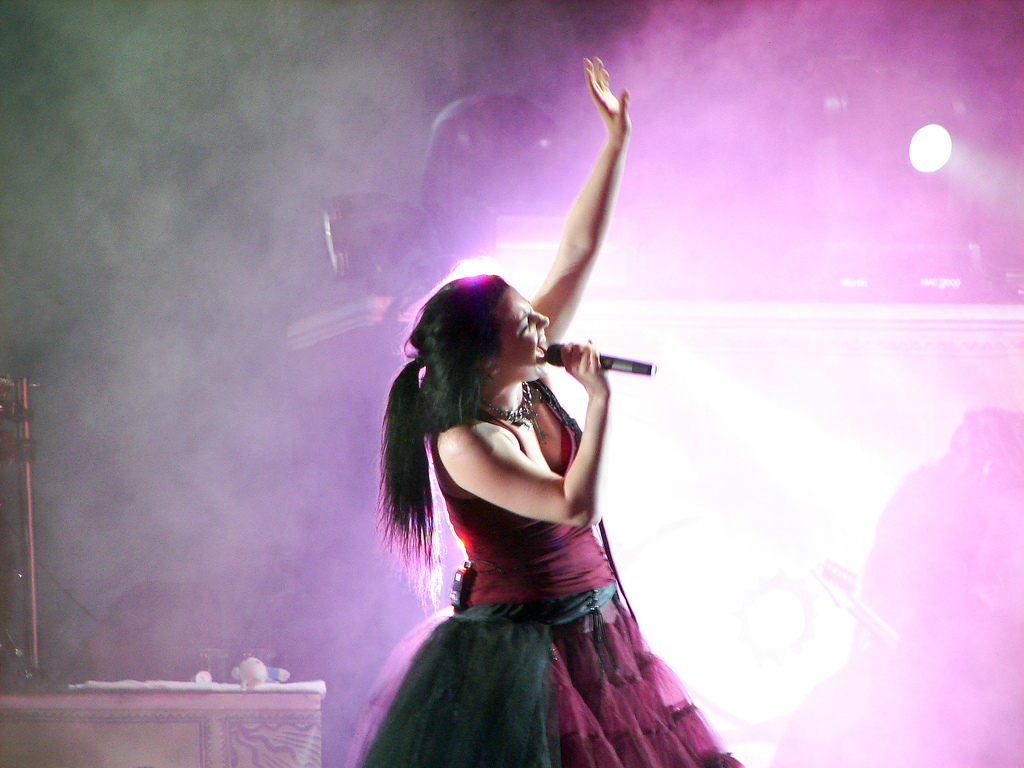
Amy Lee in 2007

The tour for The Open Door began on October 5, 2006, in Toronto, and included locations in Canada, the U.S., and Europe during that year. This first tour continued on January 5, 2007, and included stops in Canada (alongside band Stone Sour), Japan, and Australia (alongside band Shihad), and then returned to the U.S. for a second tour in the spring (alongside bands Chevelle and Finger Eleven). As part of their tour, Evanescence performed on April 15, 2007, on the Argentinian festival Quilmes Rock 07 along with Aerosmith, Velvet Revolver, and other local bands.

On May 4, 2007, guitarist John LeCompt announced that he had been fired from Evanescence, and also stated that drummer Rocky Gray had decided to quit. Former Evanescence player David Hodges commented on LeCompt and Gray's attitude, stating: "The only thing I would have done differently than Amy in the last two years is distance myself sooner from [them]." Lee stated that LeCompt and Gray had joined as tour players after Fallen was made, and were treated as full members with their picture on album images. When it came to making the second album, she and Balsamo tried writing with them but they were ultimately not compatible. Lee said LeCompt and Gray disliked the music, were vocal about not caring about the band, and had been working with their other bands but stayed as Evanescence live players for the money while planning to leave at a later time. She added that she "knowingly let this negative energy grow within my band for a very long time because I was afraid of the appearance of falling apart when in reality trying to hold on to these guys is what was holding us back." In 2010, LeCompt said of his time in the band, "[Evanescence] was so big and important to my career and my life so I look back on it with fondness. We left the band but that doesn't say anything about my time in that band."

On May 17, 2007, former Dark New Day members, drummer Will Hunt and guitarist Troy McLawhorn were announced to have joined Evanescence on tour, replacing Gray and LeCompt. Lee and Balsamo said that the addition of Hunt and McLawhorn was good for the band, as they're easy to get along with, have similar tastes, are passionate players, have good energy on stage, and enjoy being in the band. The band finished their European tour with a sell-out concert at the Amphi in Ra'anana, Israel, on June 26, 2007. After the European tour, they co-headlined Korn's Family Values Tour 2007 in the US, and followed it with a headlining tour in the US. After the end of the album's tour, Lee took a break to recollect herself and live life away from the industry. By October 2011, The Open Door had sold six million copies worldwide.

=== 2009–2014: Evanescence and hiatus ===
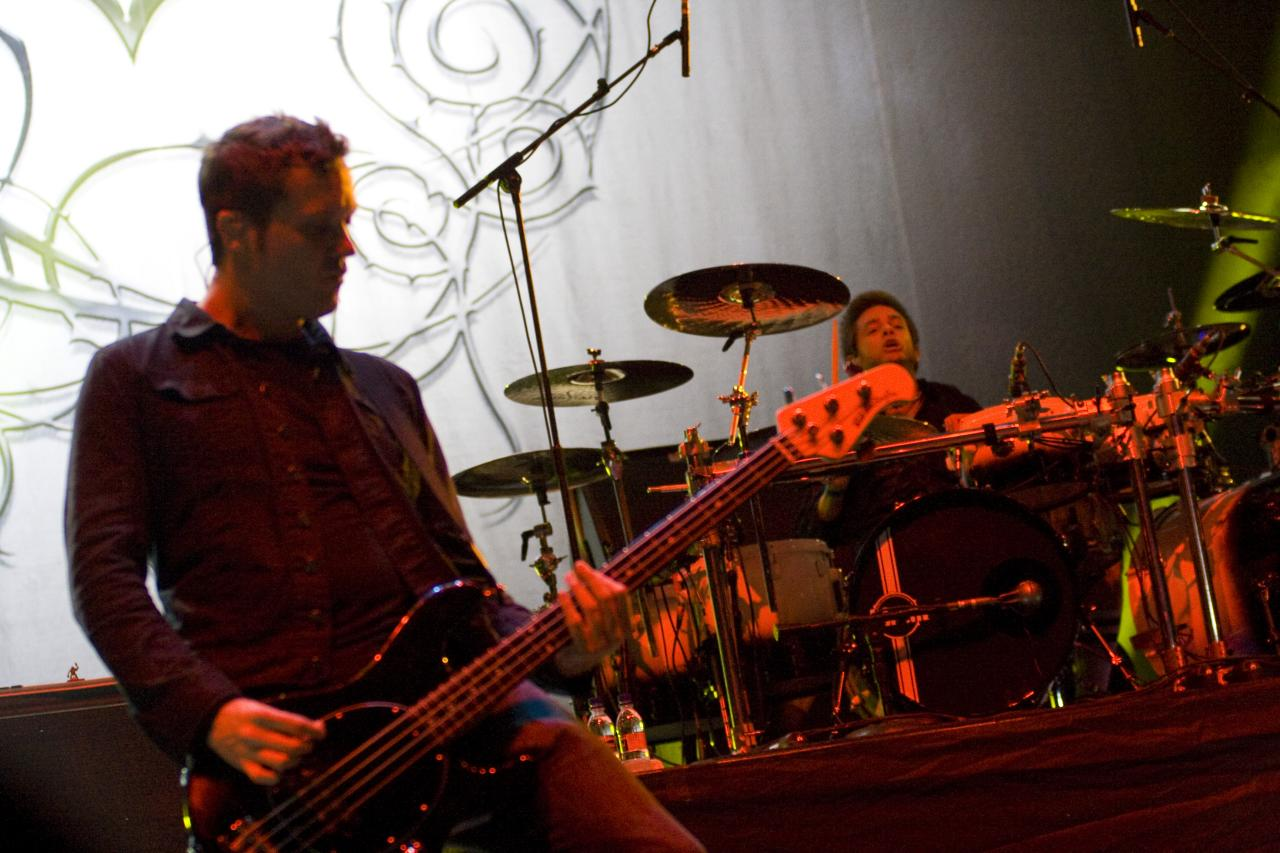
Tim McCord playing with the band at a concert at Maquinaria Festival, São Paulo, Brazil in November 2009

About 18 months after Lee stepped away from the industry, she began writing music again, and went into the studio with producer Steve Lillywhite. In a news posting to the Evanescence website during June 2009, Lee wrote that the band was in the process of writing new material for a new album proposed for release in 2010. The band played a "secret show" at the Manhattan Center Grand Ballroom in New York City on November 4, 2009, with label mates Civil Twilight. Tickets for the show sold out in five minutes. This show acted as a warm-up for their headline appearance at the Maquinária Festival in São Paulo, Brazil, which took place on November 8.

In January 2010, Evanescence released "Together Again" as a digital download, a song created for The Open Door but later cut. The song was released to aid the United Nations Foundation in Haiti earthquake recovery efforts. It later received an official release as a digital download on February 23, 2010.

Evanescence entered the studio on February 22, 2010, to begin recording for the new album, with Will "Science" Hunt assisting in programming. David Campbell, who previously worked on The Open Door, was brought back to handle string arrangements, and the album was initially being produced by Lillywhite. Lee later said that "Steve wasn't the right fit" and was replaced by producer Nick Raskulinecz. It was later revealed that the record label had scrapped the material recorded with Lillywhite.

At the time the band began recording, the album was intended for an August or September 2010 release. However, on June 21, 2010, Lee announced on EvThreads.com that Evanescence had temporarily left the studio to work further on the album and "get our heads into the right creative space". Lee also indicated that record label Wind-up Records was going through "uncertain times", which would further delay the release of the album. The band reentered the studio in early April 2011 with Raskulinecz, who had produced music for Alice in Chains, Deftones, and Foo Fighters, to continue work on the third album. It was reported that the album would be released in late 2011.

On June 12, 2011, Lee announced through her Twitter account that guitarist Troy McLawhorn, who worked with Seether for a time and left, was officially back with Evanescence, and the release date for their new album would be October 4, 2011. Later, on July 11, 2011, it was reported by MTV News that the release date for the album had been pushed back to October 11, and that the first single from the album will be "What You Want". The band recorded the album at Blackbird Studio in Nashville. During an interview with Kerrang!, Lee revealed that the new album's title will be Evanescence. Lee said that the decision for the title of the album was her love towards Evanescence, as well as the record being composed more collaboratively than past albums, with all members contributing. The record is "about the band", Lee explained. Its lyrical themes include Lee "falling back in love" with Evanescence, her being inspired by nature and the ocean, brokenness, the quest for freedom, and falling in love. Different from The Open Door, which was "all about me and my personal experiences", Evanescence also includes Lee's musings on events that occurred to others in her life. "But really, whatever makes me feel the most, that's what's on the record, because that's what I need to get off my chest."

Evanescence debuted at the top of the Billboard 200 with sales of 127,000 in the US, becoming the band's second number one album on the chart after The Open Door. The Evanescence Tour began on August 17, 2011, with a show at War Memorial Auditorium in Nashville. The band then performed at Rock on the Range in Winnipeg on August 20, 2011, and at Rock in Rio on October 2 alongside Guns N' Roses and System of a Down as well as Brazilian artists Pitty and Detonautas Roque Clube. After a series of events in North America, Evanescence traveled to Europe in November to play a sold-out tour in the UK, Germany and France, with support from The Pretty Reckless and Australian band ME. Evanescence performed at the Nobel Peace Prize Concert on December 11, 2011, where they played "Lost in Paradise" and "Bring Me to Life", before again touring in North America. In February 2012 they toured Japan with Dazzle Vision, and in the same month performed in other southeast Asian countries. March 2012 saw the band tour Australia and New Zealand with Blaqk Audio. Between April and July 2012, Evanescence toured in Europe and North America, with additional stops in Africa and the Middle East.

Evanescence took part in the Carnival of Madness Tour alongside Halestorm, Cavo, New Medicine, and Chevelle. The tour began on July 31, 2012, in Springfield, Illinois, and ran through September 2, 2012, ending in Buffalo. The Evanescence Tour resumed in October 2012 with stops in South America, Costa Rica, and Panama. The tour wrapped with a series of shows in England, ending on November 9, 2012, in London's Wembley Arena. Lee stated the band planned to take an extended break after the tour, saying, "At the end of any really long tour you need to get your head in order. I think at the end of the run we'll go on a break for a while and figure things out." In 2013, the band was featured in an NME article titled "28 Nu-Metal Era Bands You Probably Forgot All About".

In October 2013, Wind-up Records sold their back catalog of artists, including Evanescence and their master recordings, to Bicycle Music Company. The combined company Concord Bicycle Music will market the catalog. On January 3, 2014, it was announced that Lee had filed a lawsuit against Wind-up Records, seeking $1.5 million in unpaid royalties owed to the band. The lawsuit was settled and Lee said she had to sign a non-disclosure agreement that she could not say anything negative, "so that's the only way in any sense that I'm still bound". In March 2014, Lee announced via her Twitter account that she and Evanescence had been released from their record label contract and were independent artists.

=== 2015–2018: Return and Synthesis ===
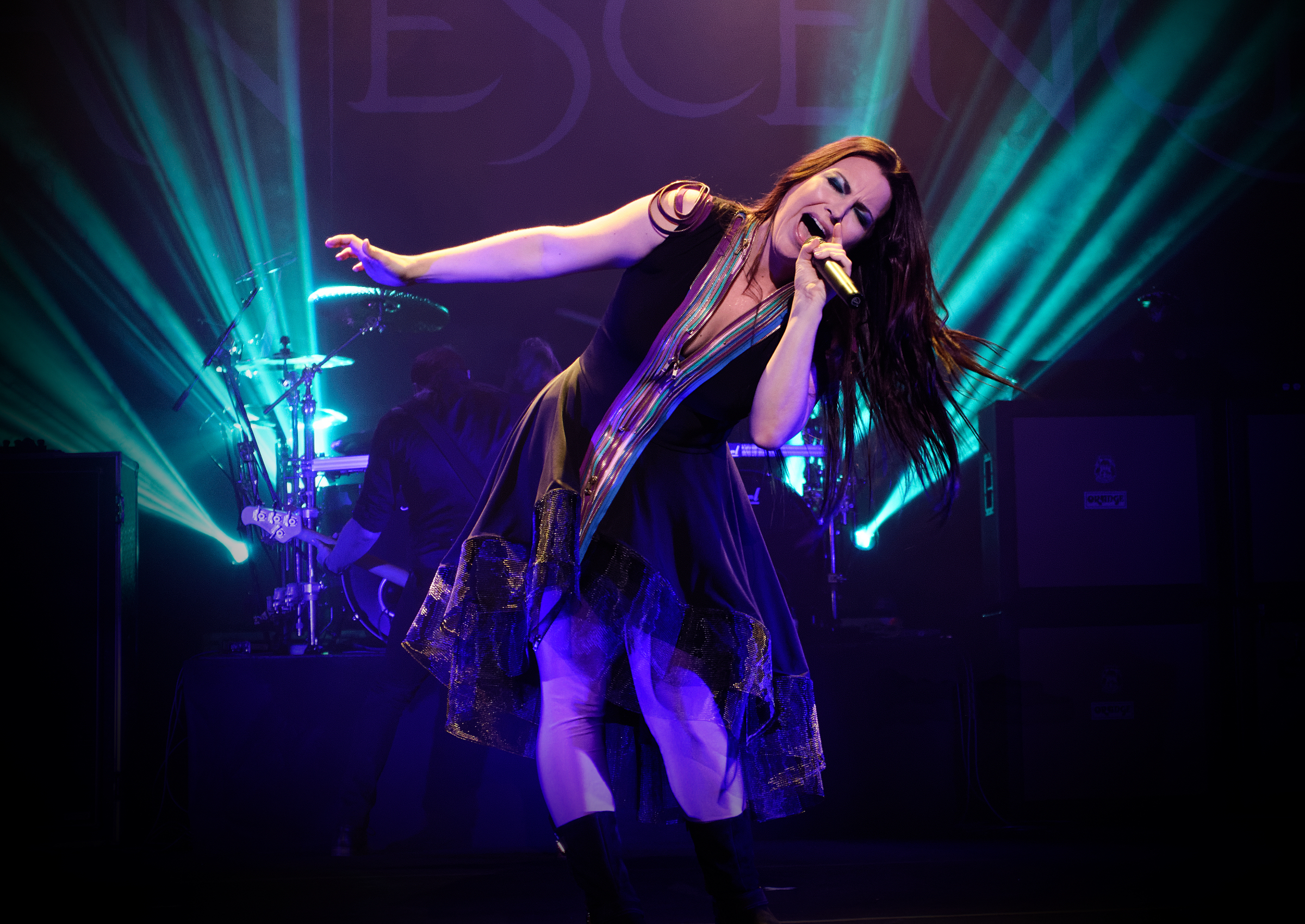
Evanescence in 2015 at the Wiltern Theatre in Los Angeles

On April 27, 2015, it was announced that the band would perform at Japan's Ozzfest on November 21, 2015, as the second headline act. On August 7, 2015, Lee announced that long-time guitarist Terry Balsamo had departed the band. His position was filled by German guitarist Jen Majura, who was recommended by Testament's Alex Skolnick.

In an October 2015 interview, Lee stated that she was focusing on solo projects so there were no current plans for new Evanescence music yet, but the band would continue to tour through 2016. "It feels really good to have a lot of different things going on at once in the sense that I feel like I'm not just flexing one muscle", she said. The band made their return to the stage in November 2015, playing three US shows and performing at Ozzfest in Tokyo, Japan, marking their first live performances since their hiatus.

In February 2016, Lee said the band was working on the six-LP vinyl box set titled The Ultimate Collection, which includes all three studio albums, the previously unreleased 2000 demo CD Origin, the rarities compilation album Lost Whispers, a studio version of the tour intro "Lost Whispers", a studio recording of the song "Even In Death", alongside a 52-page casebound book with art, handwritten lyrics, photos and rarities. The box set was released in February 2017, and the compilation album Lost Whispers was made available for streaming and downloading on Spotify, iTunes, and Anghami. It contains the re-recorded "Even in Death", previously released B-sides, the four deluxe edition bonus tracks to Evanescence, and the new song "Lost Whispers".

In the fall of 2016, the band toured select cities in the US, choosing alternative rock band Veridia as their opener. During this tour, the band played a new song titled "Take Cover", an outtake from the scrapped 2010 sessions for their self-titled album. In an October 2016 interview with Loudwire, Lee confirmed that "there is Evanescence in the future", adding that she wants to take things step by step. She said in another interview that the band was not making a new album yet but working on a project that was "not exactly the most traditional thing", something that would take fans on a "different path that we wanna try". In February 2017, it was confirmed that the band was working in the studio.

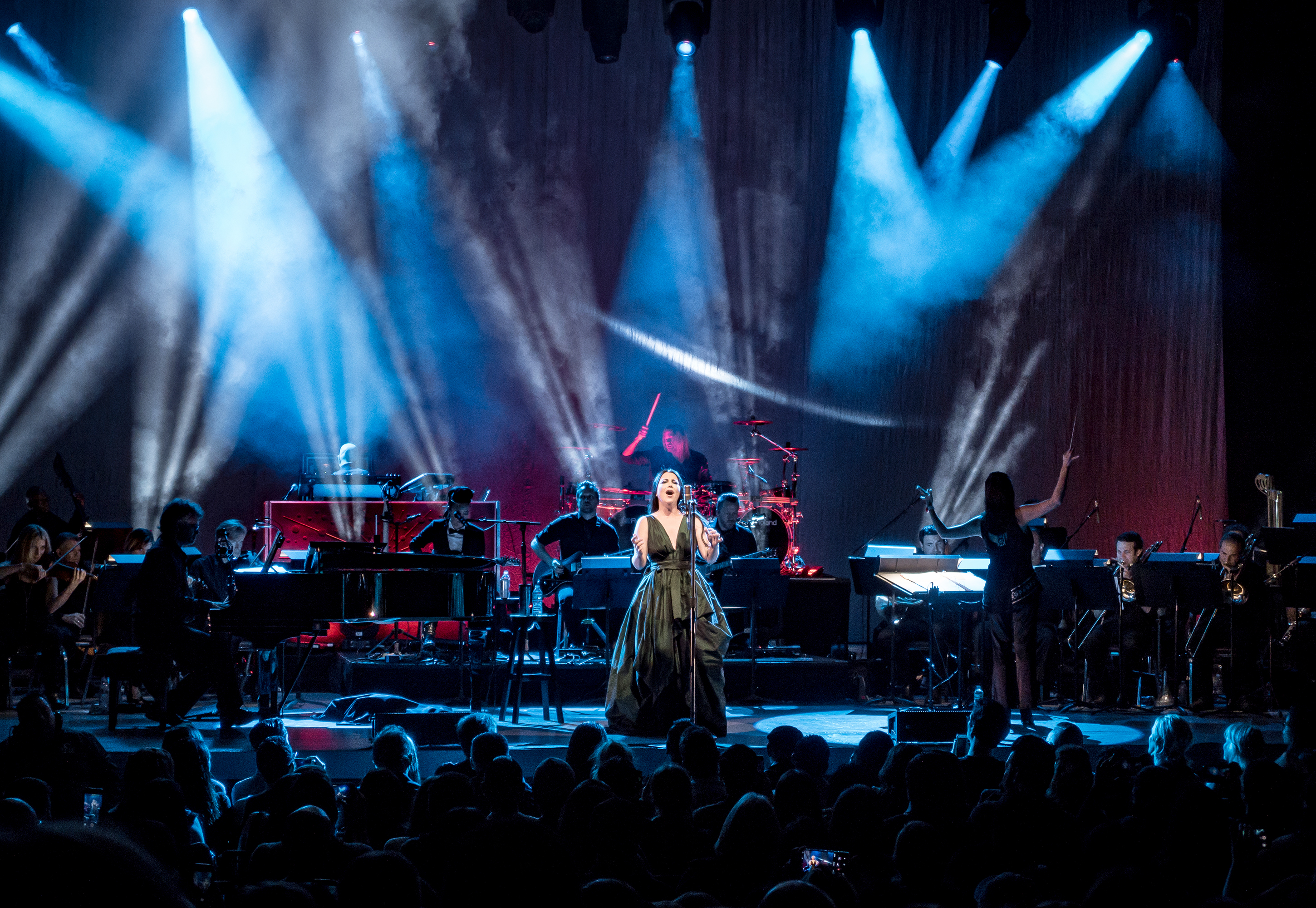
Evanescence performing live at the Greek Theatre in Los Angeles on October 15, 2017, as part of their Synthesis tour

In a March 2017 interview with AOL Build, Lee spoke about her solo single, "Speak to Me" and "a new album" in the works by Evanescence, stating, "We're working on something. [...] It's not just a straightforward 'next Evanescence album'". In a March 23 interview with Metal Hammer, Lee stated that "It's something unique, something complex, something a little bit beyond that – and it's definitely new territory for all of us." The album was intended for release later in 2017.

In a Facebook post, Lee revealed that the new album is titled Synthesis. It is an orchestral and electronica piece, with selected songs from the band's previous albums rebuilt into classical arrangements reminiscent of a soundtrack, Lee said. Synthesis contains two new original songs: "Hi-Lo" featuring violinist Lindsey Stirling, and "Imperfection". The first recording session for Synthesis took place on May 23, 2017, and a remake of "Bring Me To Life" was released as a single on August 18. On August 15, the band announced that recording Synthesis was in its final stages. Evanescence toured with a full orchestra in late 2017 in support of the album, and tickets were sold starting on August 18. The band later toured across the US, Australia and Europe. Each ticket purchased came with a digital copy of Synthesis after its release. On September 14, 2017, the single "Imperfection" was officially released.

In March 2018, Evanescence announced that Lindsey Stirling would be joining the second North American leg as part of Evanescence's Synthesis Tour. While their focus would remain on touring, Lee stated during a July 2018 interview on WRIF that the band would begin working on their next studio album.

=== 2019–2023: The Bitter Truth ===
On February 4, 2019, the band released dates and locations for a spring/summer 2019 US concert tour. In May 2019, former guitarist Terry Balsamo performed with the band again at a live show for the song "Sweet Sacrifice". On May 11, 2019, Lee was quoted by Blabbermouth on plans for Evanescence to release a new studio album in 2020. In a November 21, 2019, Reddit AMA, Lee said of the album, "It's dark and heavy. Its also got moments of weird and sparse. Little bit of everything. Definitely some Open Door vibes but not the same."

On September 17, 2019, Evanescence and symphonic metal band Within Temptation announced a seven-city joint European tour titled Worlds Collide originally scheduled for April 2020. However, due to the COVID-19 pandemic, the tour was postponed for September 2020. It was then pushed back a second time to take place in September 2021. The tour had to be rescheduled a third time, with March 2022 set as the start date. The last postponement was announced in February 2022, with the tour scheduled for November and December 2022.

On September 5, 2019, Xbox released a launch trailer for the video game Gears 5 that included a version of Lee's cover of Fleetwood Mac's "The Chain". Initially a solo project by Lee, she then got approval to cover the song with the band and a full version of the song was released by Evanescence on November 22, 2019, which features backing vocals by the other members of the band. The cover hit number one on the Billboard Rock Digital Song Sales chart. A music video for the song was released on January 9, 2020. The cover song would not be included on the band's upcoming fifth album.

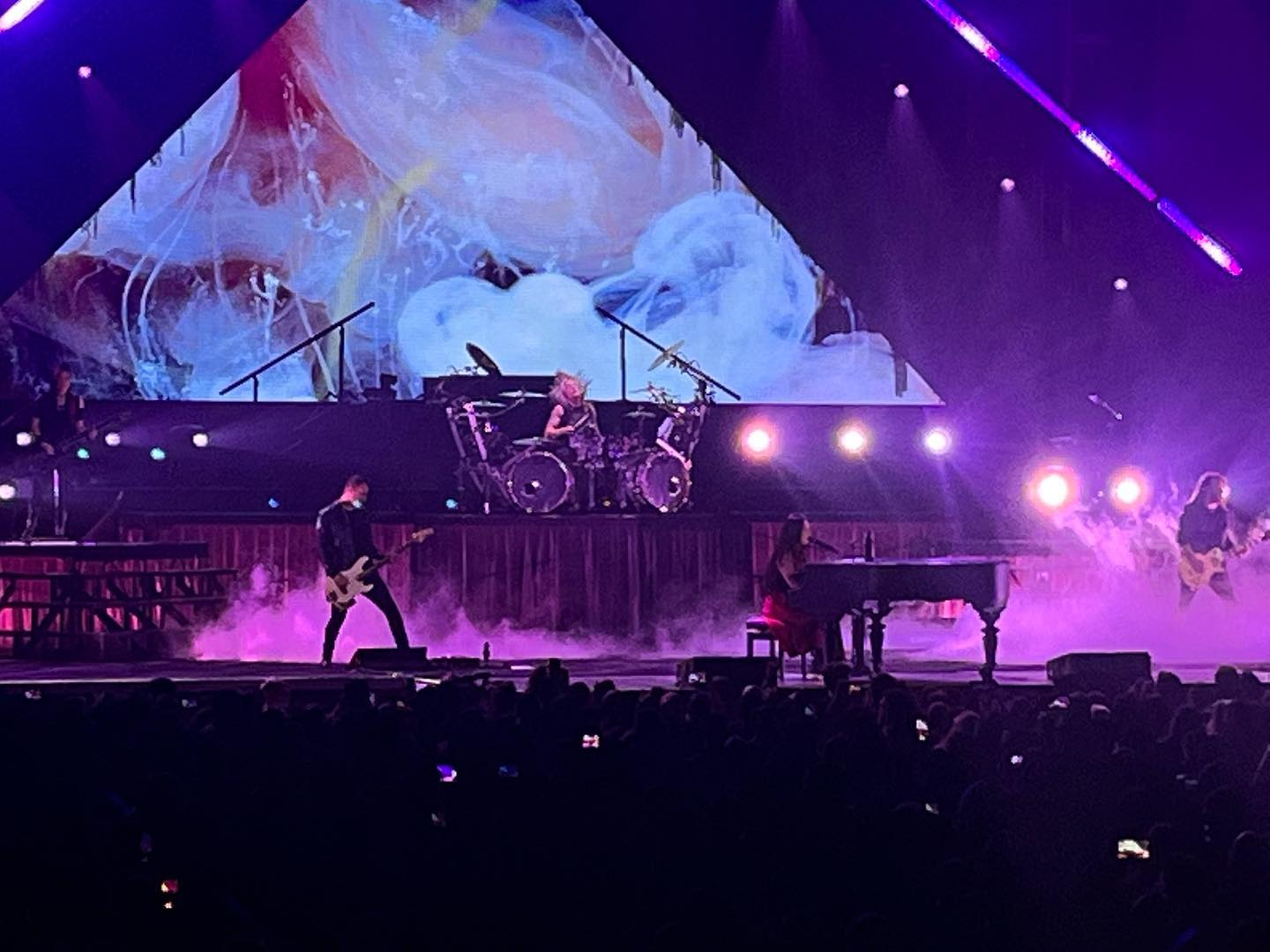
Evanescence performing live at the DCU Center in Worcester, Massachusetts, on January 20, 2022

At the end of January 2020, the band entered the studio with Nick Raskulinecz, who produced their 2011 self-titled album, to work on three "heavy" songs. They would originally record only two songs with him, but ended up recording four. They planned to work piecemeal with the recording process, finishing a few songs with a producer and then working on a few other songs with another producer, but this plan was set aside because of the COVID-19 pandemic.

On April 17, 2020, the band announced the title of their new album, The Bitter Truth, along with the artwork. The album's first single, "Wasted on You", was released on April 24 along with a music video. The music video was directed by P. R. Brown and included shots of the band members, at home due to the pandemic. The second single, "The Game Is Over", was released on July 1. "Use My Voice", the album's third single, was released on August 14. It features backing vocals from Lzzy Hale, Lindsey Stirling, Taylor Momsen, Deena Jakoub, and Sharon den Adel, and was used in a HeadCount campaign to encourage Americans to vote in the United States presidential election.

On December 4, 2020, it was announced that the album would be released on March 26, 2021, and contain 12 tracks, including Evanescence outtake "Take Cover". Along with the album's pre-order, the fourth single, "Yeah Right", was released as an instant grab. On March 5, 2021, the band released the fifth single, "Better Without You". The song touches upon Lee's struggle in the music industry. A Kerrang! cover story stated that Lee considers The Bitter Truth their fourth album, not 2017's Synthesis, though it is the fifth album overall.

Evanescence and Halestorm's US tour was announced in May 2021 for the fall. The tour began on November 5, 2021, with the last city stop set for December 18, 2021. More dates were added in September 2021. In December 2021, the last five shows were rescheduled due to COVID-19 cases within the band's touring camp, with the tour completed in January 2022. Evanescence was voted by Revolver readers one of the top five live bands of 2021, with Revolver stating that The Bitter Truth "wasn't just a return for Evanescence — it was a rebirth."

In February 2022, "Bring Me to Life"'s music video surpassed 1 billion views on YouTube. In May 2022, the band announced that it parted ways with guitarist Jen Majura, and McCord would return to his natural guitar while Emma Anzai of Sick Puppies would join as their new bassist. On July 15, 2022, Evanescence headlined the Rock Fest festival.

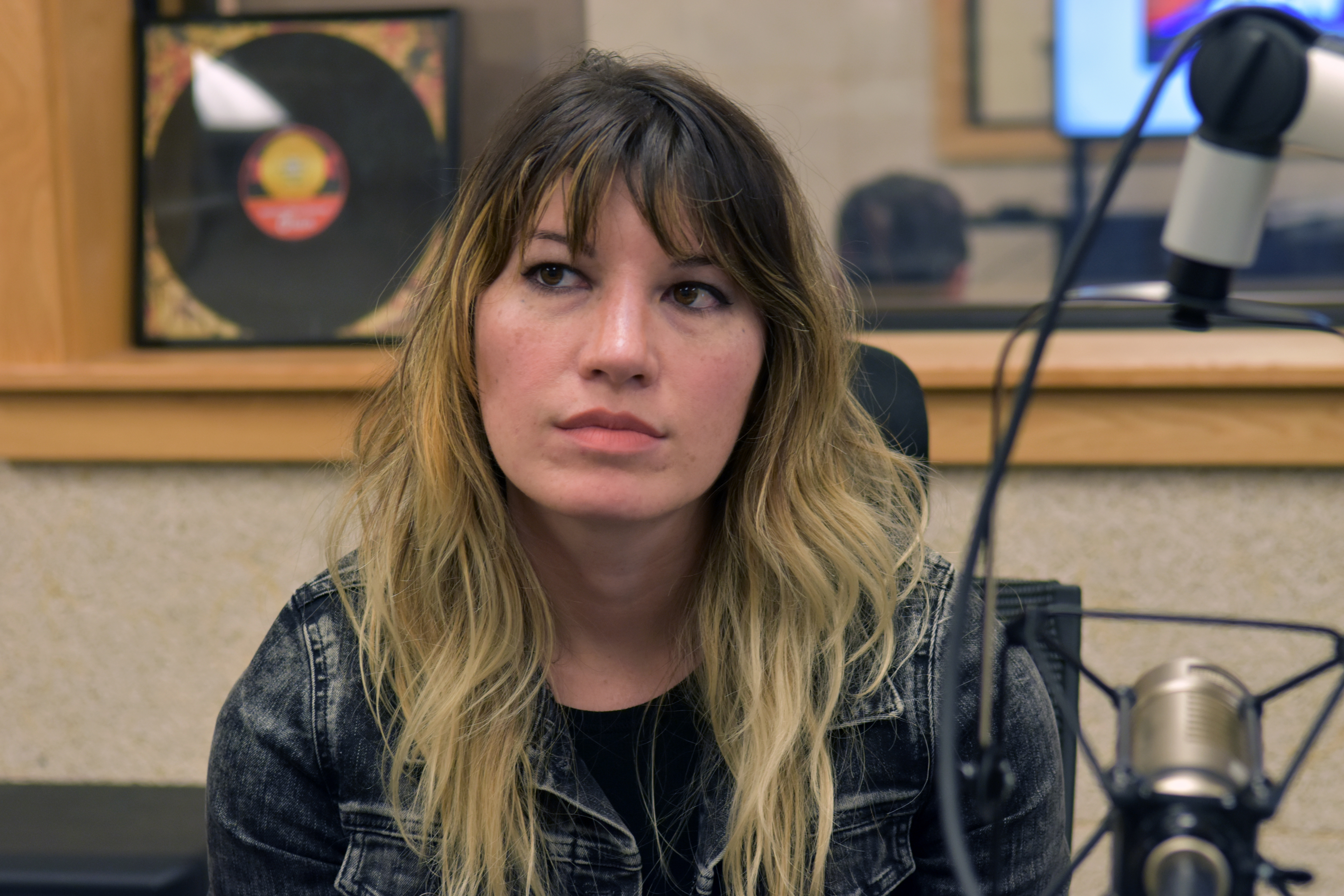
Bassist Emma Anzai (pictured 2019) joined the band in 2022.

Evanescence and Korn co-headlined an 18-dates US summer tour from August 16 to September 16, 2022. The band also played Rocklahoma festival in early September, and the Aftershock Festival in Sacramento, California the following month. After four rescheduled attempts since 2019, Evanescence's co-headlining Worlds Collide European tour with Within Temptation began on November 9, 2022, running until December 8, 2022. According to Loudwire in August 2022, Evanescence have sold a total of 31.9 million albums, making the band one of the best selling hard rock and metal artists of all time.

Evanescence joined Muse on their North American tour from February to April 2023. In May, the band performed at the inaugural Sick New World festival in Las Vegas, and Welcome to Rockville festival in Florida. The following month, they traveled to Europe to play the German festivals Rock am Ring and Rock im Park, Download Festival's 20th anniversary in England, where they played to what was deemed the biggest crowd ever for the second stage and their performance was listed by Metal Hammer as one of the 20 greatest Download festival sets ever, and a solo show in Poland and France. They then performed at Japan's Summer Sonic Festival on August 19–20, and toured Australia from August 24 to September 2. The band returned to the US to play Blue Ridge Rock Festival on September 7, and a show in Atlantic City, New Jersey on September 8. From October 7 to October 28, they embarked on a Latin American tour across Mexico, Chile, Argentina, and Brazil. The band played their biggest solo show ever at the Allianz Parque stadium in São Paulo, Brazil. In November, Evanescence was awarded Rock Sound's 2023 Hall of Fame award.

=== 2024–present: Sanctuary ===
In September 2024, the band stated that they would be entering the studio to record new music for their sixth studio album in November. On March 27, 2025, they released the song "Afterlife" for the Netflix anime Devil May Cry. On May 9, Lee teamed up with singer Halsey for a duet on "Hand That Feeds", in promotion for the 2025 John Wick spinoff film Ballerina. Additionally, the band released "Fight Like a Girl" featuring American singer K. Flay, which features in the end credits of the film.

In December 2025, Evanescence announced a headlining world tour set to begin in June 2026, featuring Spiritbox, Poppy, Nova Twins, and K. Flay as support acts across select dates. This follows Lee's collaboration with Spiritbox vocalist Courtney LaPlante and Poppy on "End of You" in September 2025.

On April 10, 2026, the lead single to the band's sixth album was released, titled "Who Will You Follow". Along with the release came the unveiling of the album's title Sanctuary, as well as the album artwork and release date of June 5.

== Artistry ==
=== Musical style ===
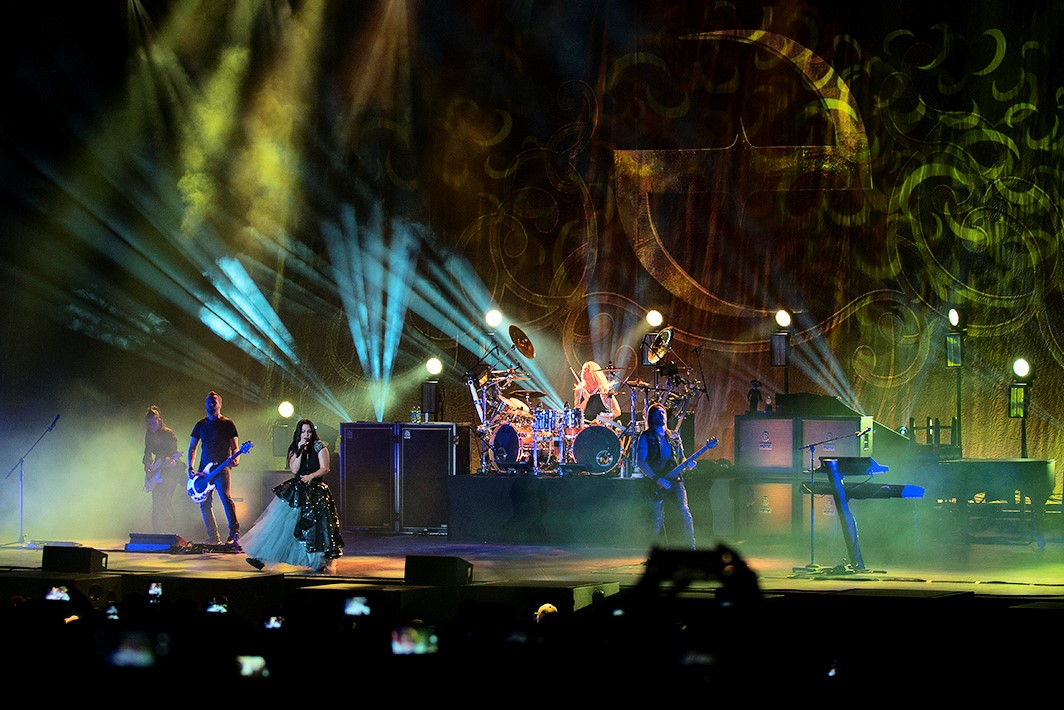
Evanescence in concert in 2019

Evanescence blends various musical styles in their music, primarily rock, classical, alternative, heavy metal, industrial, and electronic. Music journalists vary in terming Evanescence a rock or metal band, and many identify gothic elements in their music. The band is generally classified as alternative metal, (Note: Alternative metal:) gothic rock, (Note: Gothic rock:) gothic metal, (Note: Gothic metal:) and hard rock. (Note: Hard rock:) Other genres used to describe the band's sound over the years include industrial rock, symphonic metal, nu metal, and symphonic rock. Evanescence have also incorporated other styles in their music, including several forms of electronic music, (Note: Electronic music:) progressive rock, R&B, soul, trip hop, and Eastern music. Lee said of the nu metal label that it was "something that they called a lot of hard rock music back then that wasn't like, happy rock" and had "the male rapping vibe". She disliked the label but does not focus on any particular category, preferring the term "alternative".

Metal Injection deemed them "gothic-tinged alternative metal mainstays", and AllMusic described their music as "alt-metal that layers orchestral and electronic touches atop brooding goth rock". Regarding the early classification of Evanescence as nu-metal, Loudwire said that this occurred due to their debut album being released at a time "when nu-metal was essentially at its peak" and they "were one of the only bands fronted by a woman that was headlining massive rock and metal festivals with Korn and the like, so putting them in the same category was likely appropriate", while their music also had "nu-metal elements in addition to gothic metal". The Washington Post said in 2006 that Lee working with any group of musicians in the band "is going to sound like Evanescence -- dark, stormy, anguished, seeking both release and transcendence." Kerrang! characterized the band's sound as a "melodic crush of haunting, baroque harmonies and heavy guitars".

Evanescence "has long had dual personalities, mixing alt-metal and symphonic rock on its three studio albums", while their fourth, Synthesis, focuses on "orchestral grandeur" with electronic percussion, The Wall Street Journal stated. The St. Louis Post-Dispatch said the band "has long been known to mix beauty and bombast", with Synthesis and its live orchestra-backed show turning Lee's "wrenching, introspective songs into neo-operatic anthems". Variety depicted the band's sound after Synthesis as "evolving from its nu-metal/post-grunge origins to, naturally, a synthesis of rock, classical and EDM". AllMusic's Stephen Thomas Erlewine wrote of Evanescence's musical evolution: "Over the years and through multiple lineup shifts, the band persevered under Lee's helm, eventually shifting from the radio-friendly anthems of their early days into a shimmering, classically inspired symphonic alternative outfit in the 2010s".

Lee has been Evanescence's main songwriter since its start. Musically led by Lee, Evanescence was originally a duo partnership, its music written by Lee and the lead guitarist until the self-titled third album, which was the first album written by Evanescence as a band. Since then, Evanescence has been a band collaboration, with Lee and the rest of the band musically co-writing and combining their work.

=== Influences ===
Lee's musical influences throughout childhood and her teenage years included classical music, Danny Elfman and Hans Zimmer's film scores, alternative music, grunge, hard rock, industrial music, death metal, groove metal, and electronica artists like Björk and Portishead. Her earliest memory of wanting to fuse various and contrasting musical styles, was when she was training in classical piano and realized that a section of a composition from Baroque composer Bach resembled heavy metal. Lee considers the Lacrimosa movement of Mozart's Requiem her favorite piece of music, and wove it into The Open Door song "Lacrymosa".

With Evanescence, Lee aimed to combine her various musical tastes, including "bringing something from the cinematic and classical symphonic world and marrying it to metal, hard rock and alternative music". "There was all this music that was inspiring me. And Evanescence was the product of these two extremes combining". Contrasting sounds is an element of Evanescence music, with Lee noting that alongside rock and metal, the band has "always had programming and inspirations from Bjork, Depeche Mode and Massive Attack and that kind of thing".

Evanescence cite Björk, Mozart, Danny Elfman, Portishead, Soundgarden, Korn, Tori Amos, Nirvana, Pantera, Nine Inch Nails, Smashing Pumpkins, Garbage, Depeche Mode, and A Perfect Circle as influences.

== Legacy ==
Various publications have noted Evanescence's musical and gendered impact in rock. The band's symphonic gothic rock style was not present in the mainstream music industry, and their success among "testosterone-driven and male-dominated" rock radio was a rarity. Evanescence was an "anomaly" breaking into the mainstream, and played a "large part in mainstream-rock radio opening its mind to playing a female voice on the airwaves", Consequence wrote. Rolling Stone said Evanescence "brought theatrics and a much-needed femininity to the hard-rock boys' club of the early 2000s". Lee "broke down the doors of the alternative metal boys club", AllMusic stated, and was a "disrupter" of the early 2000s mainstream music scene. The Daily Telegraph noted that "the people who doubted that pianos or female vocals belonged in rock music were quickly proven wrong" with Evanescence albums' success and Lee's "singular voice in a scene dominated by macho aggression". Evanescence had a "big" impact "on the next generation of bands", Kerrang! wrote, and Lee "has helped light the path for many dauntless young women in music", The Los Angeles Times stated. Kerrang! named Evanescence "one of heavy music's most important, influential and relevant bands", and remarked that there is "a timelessness about their sound that's barely dated over the last two decades" and their "emotional potency has only been enhanced".

== Band members ==
Current

- Amy Lee – lead vocals, piano, keyboards, harp (1994–present)
- Troy McLawhorn – guitar (2007–present)
- Tim McCord – guitar (2022–present); bass (2006–2022)
- Emma Anzai – bass, backing vocals (2022–present)
- Will Hunt – drums (2007–present)

Former

- Ben Moody – guitar (1994–2003)
- Terry Balsamo – guitar (2003–2015)
- John LeCompt – guitar (2005–2007; touring musician 2003–2005)
- Jen Majura – guitar, backing vocals, theremin (2015–2022)
- Will Boyd – bass (2005–2006; touring musician 2003–2005)
- David Hodges – keyboards, backing vocals (2000–2002)
- Rocky Gray – drums (2005–2007; touring musician 2003–2005)

Timeline

== Discography ==
- Fallen (2003)
- The Open Door (2006)
- Evanescence (2011)
- Synthesis (2017)
- The Bitter Truth (2021)
- Sanctuary (2026)

== Bibliography ==
- Echoes from the Void - #1-5 (script: Carrie Lee South and Blake Northcott, illustrator: Abigail Larson and Kelly McKernan, letterer: Jacob Bascle, editor: Llexi Leon; Heavy Metal, 2021)

== Awards and nominations ==
Evanescence's accolades include two Grammy Awards out of seven nominations, three Loudwire Music Awards, a Kerrang! Award, a Revolver Golden Gods Award, a Rock Sound award, a Brit Award nomination, three American Music Award nominations, and five MTV Video Music Award nominations.
